= 312th Aeronautical Systems Group =

312th Aeronautical Systems Group

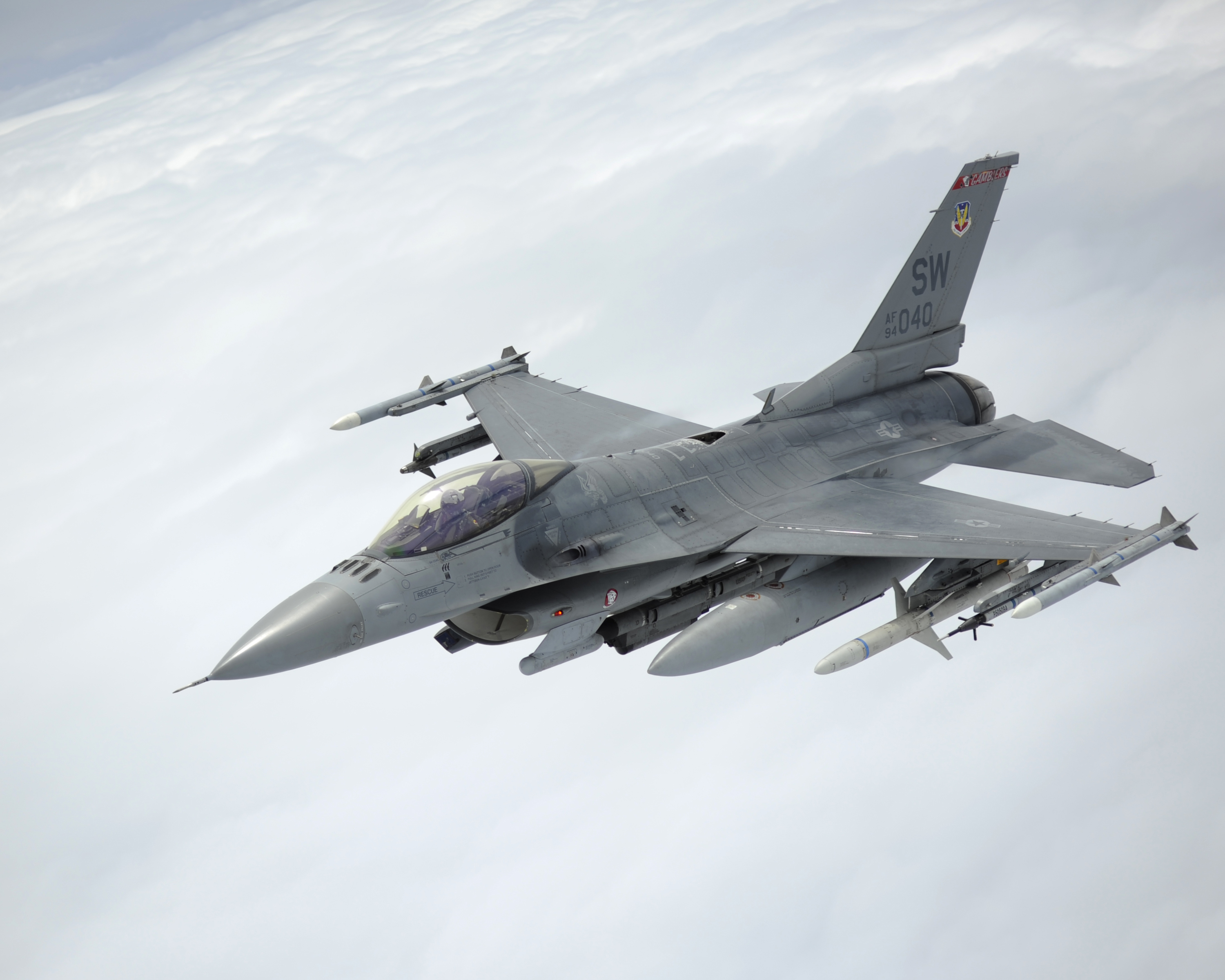
- F-16 Fighting Falcon The group was responsible for F-16 systems
- Active: 1942–1946; 1947–1949; 1954–1957; 2005–2010
- Country: United States
- Branch: United States Air Force
- Role: Systems Development
- Part of: Air Force Materiel Command
- Engagements: Southwest Pacific Theater (1944–1945)
- Decorations: Distinguished Unit Citation; Philippine Presidential Unit Citation

Insignia
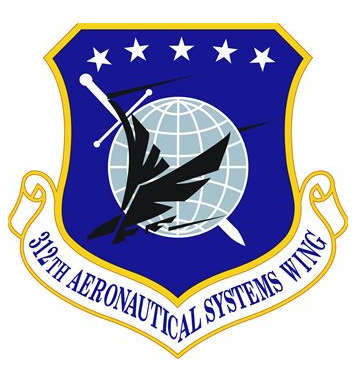
- 312 Aeronautical Systems Wing emblem (Note: The group uses the 312th Aeronautical Systems Wing emblem with the group designation on the scroll. Bailey, Factsheet, 312 Aeronautical Systems Group.)

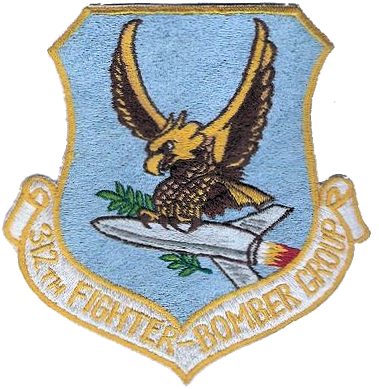
- 312th Tactical Fighter Group emblem (approved 30 November 1956)

The 312th Aeronautical Systems Group is an inactive United States Air Force unit. It was last active in June 2010 at Wright-Patterson Air Force Base, Ohio, where it was a component of Air Force Materiel Command.

During World War II, as the 312th Bombardment Group, it operated primarily in the Southwest Pacific Theater as an A-20 Havoc light bomber unit assigned to Fifth Air Force. The group also flew the B-32 Dominator on several evaluation combat missions at the end of the war. It was awarded both the Distinguished Unit Citation and the Philippine Presidential Unit Citation for its combat service in New Guinea; the Western Pacific; Leyte, and Luzon.

== History ==
see: 312th Aeronautical Systems Wing for related lineage and history

=== World War II ===
The 312th Bombardment Group was activated on 15 March 1942 at Bowman Field (Fort Knox) Kentucky. It was redesignated 312th Bombardment Group (Dive) in July 1942 and trained in the United States for several months with Douglas A-24 Banshee, Vultee V-72, North American A-36 Apache, and Curtiss P-40 Warhawk aircraft.

The unit was deployed to the Southwest Pacific, October–December 1943, and assigned to Fifth Air Force. It was again redesignated as the 312th Bombardment Group (Light) in December 1943. It began operations in New Guinea, flying patrol and escort missions. Following its conversion to the Douglas A-20 Havoc, the group attacked airfields, troop concentrations, gun positions, bridges, and warehouses on the northern and western coasts of New Guinea. It moved to the Philippines in November 1944 and provided support for ground troops and struck airfields and transportation facilities.

The 312th received a Distinguished Unit Citation for actions against Japanese butanol plants in Formosa, 25 March – 4 April 1945.

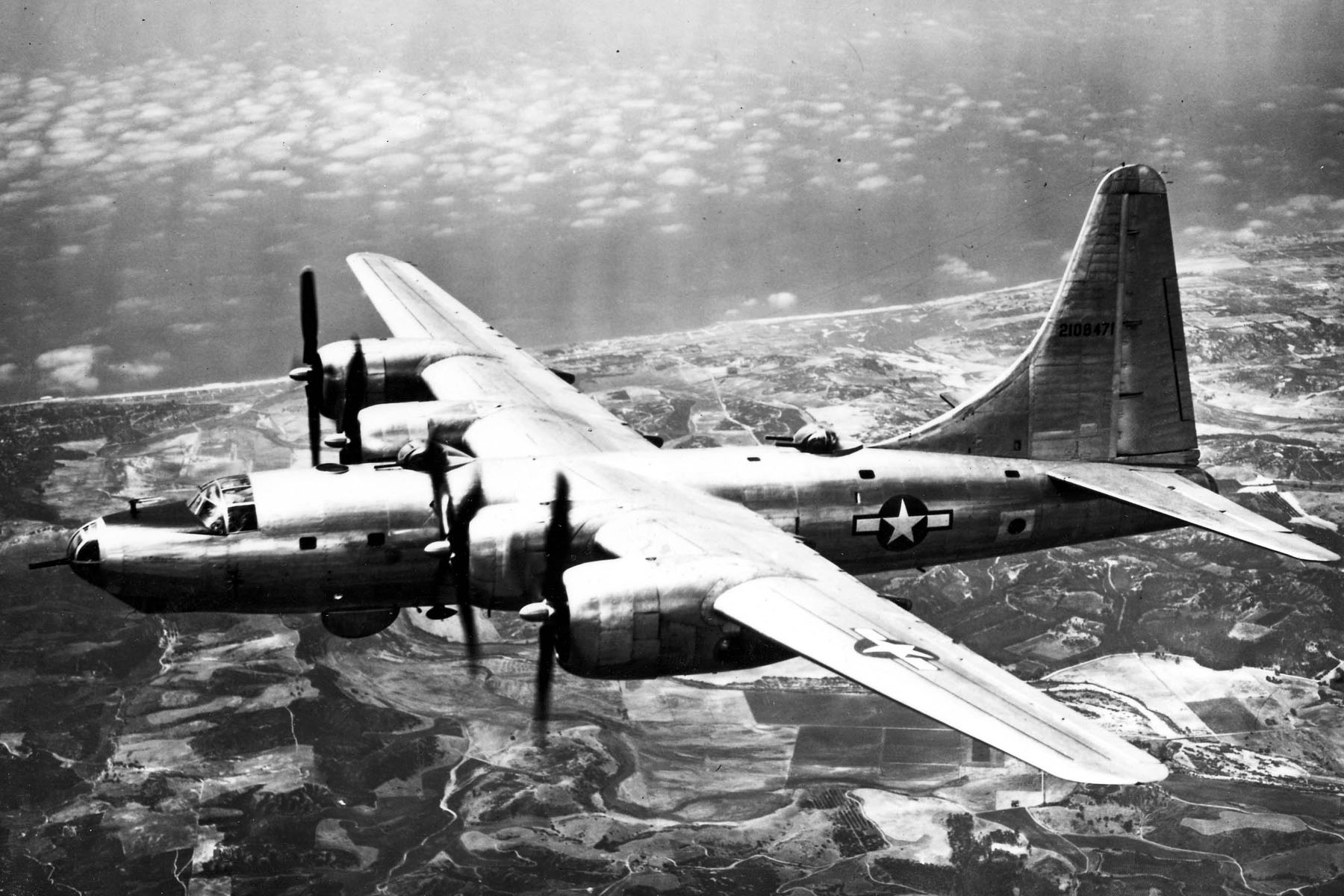
Consolidated B-32 Dominator

The 312th was selected to carry out field operation testing of the Consolidated B-32 Dominator in mid-1945 and made test flights over Luzon and Formosa in June 1945. The B-32 had been in development since before World War II, but a protracted development period delayed production versions of the aircraft until 1945. The first two B-32s arrived on Luzon on 2 May, with a third aircraft arriving the next day.

The first combat mission took place on 29 May 1945. It was a strike against a Japanese supply depot in Luzon's Cagayan Valley. All three of the Dominators were to take part, but one aborted on takeoff. The other two proceeded to the target. There was no enemy opposition, and bombing runs were made from an altitude of 10,000 feet, and both aircraft returned without incident. This raid was followed by a series of attacks on Japanese targets in the Philippines, in Formosa, and on Hainan Island in the Tonkin Gulf. The only opposition encountered during these missions was some rather inaccurate flak. The tests were thus deemed a success, and plans were made to convert the entire 386th Bombardment Squadron to B-32s. The 312th was scheduled to move to Okinawa as soon as the conversion of the 386th BS to the B-32 was completed.

Redesignated as the 312th Bombardment Group, Heavy in July 1945, the unit moved to Okinawa in August 1945 and received six more aircraft. After the Atomic Bomb missions had been flown, Combat operations were flown with the B-32 in spite of the de facto cease-fire that had been called following the bombing of Nagasaki. During this time, the B-32s flew mainly photographic reconnaissance missions, most of which were unopposed. However, on 17 August a group of 4 B-32s flying over Tokyo were fired on by radar-directed flak and were attacked by Japanese fighters. The American aircraft escaped with only minor damage, claiming one confirmed fighter kill and two probables. During a reconnaissance mission over Tokyo on 18 August, two B-32s were attacked by Japanese fighters. The American gunners claimed two kills and one probable, but one aircraft was badly shot up and one of her crew was killed with two being injured. This was to prove to be the last combat action of World War II.

The last Dominator mission of the war was flown by four B-32s on 28 August in a reconnaissance mission to Tokyo. The mission was a disaster, although not because of any enemy action. 42-108544 lost an engine on takeoff and skidded off the runway. All 13 men aboard perished when the aircraft exploded and burned. On the way back from the target, 42-108528 lost power on two of its four engines. The plane's pilot ordered the crew to bail out, but two men were killed.

After VJ-Day, the surviving B-32 aircraft were ordered to return to the United States, ending the test program. The 312th remained on Okinawa until December until returning to the United States. It was inactivated on 6 January 1946.

=== Cold War ===
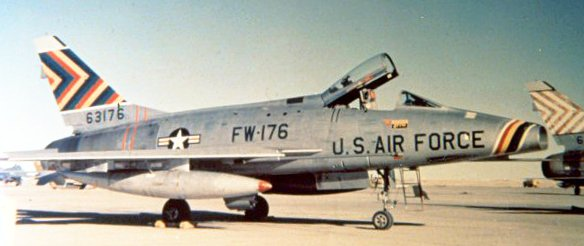
474th TFW Wing Commander's aircraft, North American F-100D-75-NA Super Sabre, AF Serial No. 56-3176

The 312th trained in the reserve from, 1947, being redesignated as the 312th Bombardment Group (Very Heavy), and equipped with B-29 Superfortresses. It was inactivated in 1949.

It was reactivated in 1954 and trained to maintain proficiency in fighter-bomber operations with conventional weapons to September 1955, then switched to training to maintain combat proficiency with atomic weapons. From April 1956 – October 1957, the wing rotated tactical squadrons to France, six months at a time. Inactivated when parent 312th Fighter-Bomber Wing adopted Tri-Deputate organization and assigned all flying squadrons directly to the Wing.

=== Systems development ===
The group was consolidates with the F-16 Systems Group as the 312th Aeronautical Systems Group in 2006 with responsibility for program execution to develop, acquire, field and modernize capabilities; and support for life-cycle management of the F-16 for the United States and coalition partners.

Unit responsibilities also included identifying, coordinating and implementing horizontal integration/capability planning in support of the global strike and global persistent attack concept of operations.

== Lineage ==
312th Tactical Fighter Group

- Established as the 312th Bombardment Group (Light) on 28 January 1942

Activated on 15 March 1942

- Redesignated 312th Bombardment Group (Dive) on 27 July 1942

Redesignated 312th Bombardment Group (Light) on 21 December 1943
Redesignated 312th Bombardment Group, Light on 14 February 1944
Redesignated 312th Bombardment Group, Heavy on 19 July 1945
Inactivated on 6 January 1946

- Redesignated 312th Bombardment Group, Very Heavy on 14 July 1947

Activated in the reserves on 30 July 1947
Inactivated on 27 June 1949

- Redesignated 312th Fighter-Bomber Group on 29 July 1954

Activated on 1 October 1954
Inactivated on 8 October 1957

- Redesignated 312th Tactical Fighter Group on 31 July 1985 (Remained inactive)
- Consolidated with the F-16 Systems Group on 23 June 2006

312th Aeronauical Systems Group

- Established as the F-16 Systems Group on 23 November 2004

Activated on 18 January 2005

- Consolidated with the 312th Tactical Fighter Group on 23 June 2006

Redesignated 312th Aeronautical Systems Group on 14 July 2006
Inactivated on 30 June 2010

=== Assignments ===
- III Air Support Command, 15 March 1942
- III Bomber Command, 16 March 1942
- XII Bomber Command, 2 May 1942
- III Ground Air Support Command, 10 August 1942
- Desert Training Center, Army Ground Forces, 20 February 1943
- III Air Support Command, 31 May 1943
- V Fighter Command, 19 November 1943
- V Bomber Command, 16 January 1944 (attached to 310th Bombardment Wing, 31 May – 3 September 1944, 1 July – 13 October 1945)
- Seventh Air Force, 18 October – 13 December 1945
- Vancouver Barracks, Washington, 3–6 January 1946
- 44th Bombardment Wing (later 44th Air Division), 30 July 1947 – 27 June 1949
- 312th Fighter-Bomber Wing, 1 October 1954 – 8 October 1957
- Fighter Attack Systems Wing (later 312th Aeronautical Systems Wing): 18 January 2005 – 30 June 2010

=== Components ===
- 386th Bombardment Squadron (later 386th Fighter-Bomber Squadron): 15 March 1942 – 18 December 1945; 13 August 1947 – 27 June 1949; 1 October 1954 – 8 October 1957
- 387th Bombardment Squadron (later 387th Fighter-Bomber Squadron): 15 March 1942 – 6 January 1946; 13 August 1947 – 27 June 1949; 1 October 1954 – 8 October 1957
- 388th Bombardment Squadron (later 388th Fighter-Bomber Squadron): 15 March 1942 – 4 January 1946; 13 August 1947 – 27 June 1949; 1 October 1954 – 8 October 1957
- 389th Bombardment Squadron: 15 March 1942 – 26 December 1945; 13 August 1947 – 27 June 1949
- 637th Aeronautical Systems Squadron, unknown – 30 June 2010
- 638th Aeronautical Systems Squadron, unknown – 30 June 2010
- 642th Aeronautical Systems Squadron, 14 July 2006 – 30 June 2010
- 643d Aeronautical Systems Squadron, 14 July 2006 – 30 June 2010

=== Stations ===
- Bowman Field, Kentucky, 15 March 1942
- Will Rogers Field, Oklahoma, May 1942
- Hunter Field, Georgia, 26 August 1942
- DeRidder Army Air Base, Louisiana, 20 February 1943
- Rice Army Air Field, California, 13 April 1943
- Salinas Army Air Base, California, 15 August–24 October 1943
- Sydney, Australia, 19 November 1943
- Brisbane, Australia, 22 November 1943
- Lae Airfield, New Guinea, 21 December 1943
- Gusap Airfield, New Guinea, c. 1 January 1944
- Hollandia, New Guinea, Netherlands East Indies, c. June–19 November 1944
- Tanauan Airfield, Leyte, Philippines, 19 November 1944
- Mangaldan Airfield, Luzon, 10 February 1945
- Floridablanca Airfield, Luzon, Philippines, 19 April – 13 August 1945
- Yontan Airfield, Okinawa, 13 August – 13 December 1945
- Vancouver Barracks, Washington, 3–6 January 1946
- Ellington Field (later Ellington Air Force Base), Texas, 30 July 1947 – 27 June 1949
- Clovis Air Force Base (later Cannon Air Force Base), New Mexico, 1 October 1954 – 8 October 1957
- Wright-Patterson Air Force Base, Ohio, 18 January 2005 – 30 June 2010

=== Aircraft ===
- Vultee V-72 (1942–1943)
- Douglas A-24 Banshee (1942–1943)
- North American A-36 Apache (1943)
- Curtiss P-40 Warhawk (1943–1944)
- Douglas A-20 Havoc (1944–1945)
- Consolidated B-32 Dominator (1945)
- North American F-86 Sabre (1954–1957)
- North American F-100 Super Sabre (1956–1959)

== See also ==
- United States Army Air Forces in Australia
