= 389th Bombardment Squadron =

- A-20 Havoc attacking a Japanese ship near New Guinea
- Active: 1942–1946; 1947–1949
- Country: United States
- Branch: United States Air Force
- Role: Light bomber
- Engagements: Antisubmarine Campaign; Southwest Pacific Theater
- Decorations: Distinguished Unit Citation; Air Force Outstanding Unit Award; Philippine Presidential Unit Citation

The 389th Bombardment Squadron is an inactive United States Air Force unit. Its last assignment was with the 312th Bombardment Group at Ellington Air Force Base, where it was inactivated on 27 June 1949.

The squadron was first activated in 1942. It trained and engaged in maneuvers until 1943, when it deployed to the Southwest Pacific Theater. It engaged in combat as a light bomber unit until the summer of 1945, earning a Distinguished Unit Citation and a Philippine Presidential Unit Citation. It returned to the United States for inactivation in 1946. It was active in the reerves from 1947 to 1949, but was not fully manned or equipped as a combat unit.

== History ==
=== World War II ===
==== Organization and training in the United States ====
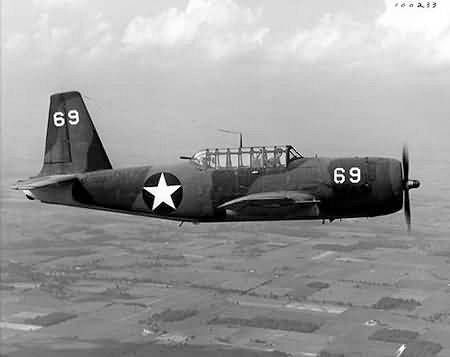
Vultee Vengeance in Flight (Note: Note the Royal Air Force camouflage, but American national markings.)

The squadron was first activated at Bowman Field, Kentucky as the 389th Bombardment Squadron. It was one of the four original squadrons of the 312th Bombardment Group. It was equipped with Vultee V-72 Vengeances, which had been ordered for the Royal Air Force, but had been pressed into service for units of the Army Air Forces. The squadron also received Douglas A-24 Banshees, and from July 1942, it trained as a dive bomber unit. In 1943, the squadron began to operate North American A-36 Apaches. In addition to training, from December 1942 to February 1943, the squadron flew antisubmarine warfare missions from Hunter Field, Georgia.

The squadron moved to Rice Army Air Field, California in April 1943, where it supported Army maneuvers with the Desert Training Center. In August, it moved to Salinas Army Air Base, California and prepared for overseas movement, departing for the Southwest Pacific Theater in late October 1943. (Note: In August 1943, AAF single engine bombardment units were redesignated fighter bomber units. The 312th Group and its component squadron appear to be the only such units to retain their bombardment designation. See Maurer, Combat Squadrons, pp. 591–639 (fighter-bomber squadrons) and their parent groups in Maurer, Combat Units.)

==== Combat in the Southwest Pacific ====
P-40 Warhawk, first plane flown in combat by the squadron

The squadron arrived in New Guinea at the end of November 1943. It equipped with Curtiss P-40 Warhawks and flew patrol and escort missions until February 1944, when it began to equip with Douglas A-20 Havocs. From bases in New Guinea, it attacked airfields, bridges, artillery batterys, troop concentrations and warehouses in the northern and western parts of New Guinea. It supported amphibious landings in New Guinea and Palau.

In November 1944, the squadron advanced to Tanauan Airfield on Leyte in the Philippines. It provided air support for ground troops and attacked airfields and transportation facilities. From 25 March to 4 April 1945, it conducted a series eight strikes against butenol plants on Formosa (Taiwan), for which it received a Distinguished Unit Citation.

The squadron moved to Yontan Airfield, Okinawa three days before V-J Day. It remained on Okinawa until December when it returned to the United States, where it was inactivated upon its arrival at the Port of Embarkation on 6 January 1946.

=== Reserve operations ===
The squadron was activated at Ellington Field, Texas in July 1947 as a unit of the reserve. It was briefly assigned directly to Tenth Air Force before returning to the control of the 312th Group. Its training was supervised by the 175th AAF Base Unit (later the 2591st Air Force Reserve Training Center) of Air Defense Command (ADC). In 1948 Continental Air Command assumed responsibility for managing reserve and Air National Guard units from ADC.

As the post war Air Force took shape, the National Guard was considered the first line of reserve. Reserve units got what was left over after National Guard units received facilities, equipment and aircraft. Aircraft were allotted to reserve units as a means of maintaining flying proficiency, not combat readiness. Aircraft assigned to the reserves were overwhelmingly trainers, with a few fighters, and no heavy bombers were ever assigned. The allotment of units to the reserves was made only for planning purposes and mobilization plans called for personnel assigned to the units to be called to active duty during mobilization as individuals, not as units.

President Truman’s reduced 1949 defense budget required reductions in the number of units in the Air Force. The Air Force reorganized its operational reserve forces into 25 wings located at 23 reserve training centers, a reduction of 18 training centers. Since the Air Force did not have the resources to support medium or heavy bomber reserve units, the squadron was inactivated in June 1949.

== Lineage ==
- Constituted as the 389th Bombardment Squadron (Light) on 28 January 1942

Activated on 15 March 1942
Redesignated 389th Bombardment Squadron (Dive) on 27 July 1942
Redesignated 389th Bombardment Squadron, Light on 6 December 1943
Redesignated 389th Bombardment Squadron, Heavy on 19 July 1945
Inactivated on 26 December 1945
Redesignated 389th Bombardment Squadron, Very Heavy on 14 July 1947
Activated in the reserve on 30 July 1947
Inactivated on 27 June 1949

=== Assignments ===
- 312th Bombardment Group, 15 March 1942 – 26 December 1945
- Tenth Air Force, 30 July 1947
- 312th Bombardment Group, 13 August 1947 – 27 June 1949

=== Stations ===
- Bowman Field, Kentucky, 15 March 1942
- Will Rogers Airport, Oklahoma, 12 June 1942
- Hunter Field, Georgia, 18 August 1942
- DeRidder Army Airbase, Louisiana, 18 February 1943
- Rice Army Airfield, California, 13 April 1943
- Salinas Army Air Base, California, 13 August – 24 October 1943
- Jackson Airfield (7 Mile Drome), Port Moresby, New Guinea, 30 November 1943
- Gusap Airfield, New Guinea, 6 January 1944
- Nadzab Airfield Complex, New Guinea, c. 10 June 1944
- Hollandia Airfield Complex, Netherlands East Indies, c. 30 June 1944
- Tanauan Airfield, Leyte, Philippines, 19 November 1944
- McGuire Field, Mindoro, Philippines, 27 January 1945
- Mangaldan Airfield, Luzon, Philippines, c. 11 February 1945
- Floridablanca Airfield, Luzon, Philippines, c. 20 April 1945
- Yontan Airfield, Okinawa, c. 12 August – 9 December 1945
- Camp Anza, California, 24–26 December 1945
- Ellington Field (later Ellington Air Force Base), Texas, 30 July 1947 – 27 June 1949

=== Aircraft ===
- Vultee V-72 Vengeance, 1942–1943
- Douglas A-24 Banshee, 1942–1943
- North American A-36 Apache, 1943
- Curtiss P-40 Warhawk, 1943–1944
- Douglas A-20 Havoc, 1944–1945

=== Awards and campaigns ===
Award streamer	Award	Dates	Notes
	Presidential Unit Citation	25 March 1945–4 April 1945	Formosa
	Philippine Republic Presidential Unit Citation	17 October 1944–4 July 1945	

Campaign Streamer	Campaign	Dates	Notes
	Antisubmarine	c. December 1942–c. February 1943	
	New Guinea	30 November 1943–31 December 1944	
	Leyte	17 October 1944–1 July 1945	
	Luzon	15 December 1944–4 July 1945	
	Western Pacific	17 April 1945–2 September 1945	389

== See also ==
- List of Douglas A-20 Havoc operators

== External link ==
- No byline (2026). "389th Bombardment Squadron (389 BS)". Pacific Wrecks.
