= 388th Electronic Warfare Squadron =

Inactive US Air Force unit

388th Electronic Warfare Squadron

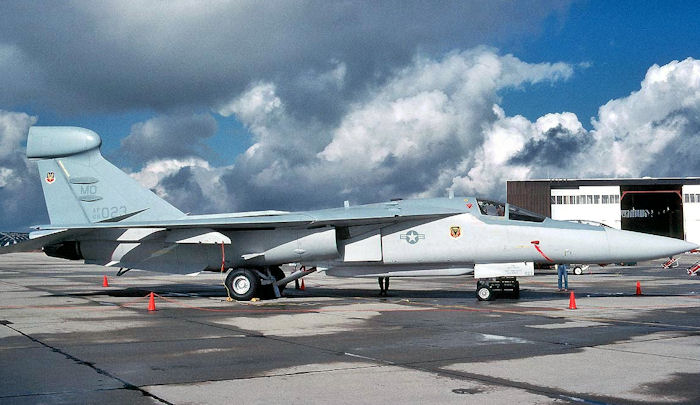
- EF-111 Raven at Mountain Home AFB
- Active: 1942–1946; 1947–1949; 1954–1959; 1977–1979; 1981–1982; 2004–2010; 2024-present
- Country: United States
- Branch: United States Air Force
- Role: Electronic Warfare
- Part of: Air Combat Command
- Garrison/HQ: Eglin AFB, Florida
- Engagements: Antisubmarine Campaign; Southwest Pacific Theater
- Decorations: Distinguished Unit Citation; Air Force Outstanding Unit Award; Philippine Presidential Unit Citation

Insignia
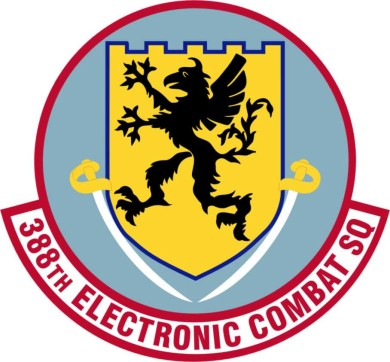
- 388th Electronic Combat Squadron emblem (Note: Approved 15 February 2005.)

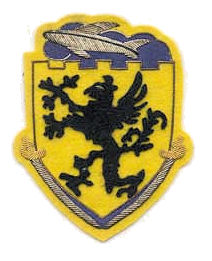
- 388th Fighter-Bomber Squadron emblem (Note: Approved 24 January 1956. Description: On a shield Air Force yellow, edged red, an heraldic griffin segeant black, the chief edge of the shield embattled; above the embattlement a stylized aircraft volant silver gray, with a deep blue highlight along the fuselage, superimposed over a light sky blue cloud; below the base of the shield two swords flanking the sides of the shield, points to base, blades silver gray, hilts and pommels gold, background area sky blue. Significance: Ultramarine blue and Air Force yellow are the Air Force colors. Blue alludes to the sky, the primary theater of Air Force operations. Yellow refers to the sun and the excellence required of Air Force personnel. The shield, suggesting the ancient battle cry, “With my shield or on it!” the unit’s determination to forge ahead, no matter what the odds. The griffin in mythology was an unconquerable guardian and alludes to the unit’s defense of America. The sabers imply the squadron’s offensive combat capability and together form the letter “V” for victory. (Approved, 24 Jan 1956))

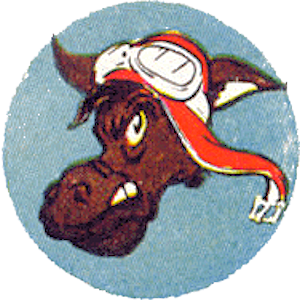
- 388th Bombardment Squadron emblem

The 388th Electronic Warfare Squadron is an active United States Air Force unit, stationed at Eglin Air Force Base, where it is assigned to the 350th Spectrum Warfare Wing.

The squadron was first activated in 1942 as the 388th Bombardment Squadron It trained and engaged in maneuvers until 1943, when it deployed to the Southwest Pacific Theater. It engaged in combat as a light bomber unit until the summer of 1945, earning a Distinguished Unit Citation and a Philippine Presidential Unit Citation. It returned to the United States for inactivation in 1946. It was active in the reerves from 1947 to 1949, but was not fully manned or equipped as a combat unit.

The squadron was activated again in 1954 as the 388th Fighter-Bomber Squadron. It trained for conventional and nuclear operations and rotated to bases in France. In 1959, it was inactivated and transferred its resources to another unit.

The squadron was again activated in February 1977 as the 388th Tactical Fighter Training Squadron. Until it was inactivated in September 1979, it trained aircrews with the General Dynamics F-111 Aardvark. It was activated again in July 1982 as the 388th Electronic Combat Suadron to train crews on the electronic warfare version of the F-111, but was replaced by another unit in 1982. It was activated to conduct joint electronic warfare training with the United States Navy in December 2004 and was again replaced by another unit in 2010. It was activated in its current fole in 2024.

== Mission ==
The 388th focuses on spectrum weapons and tactics, intelligence, test management and education and training. It evaluates and assesses adversary capabilities and identifies vulnerabilities. Focusing on improving the Air Force’s electronic warfare capability, the 388th aids warfighters to integrate electronic warfare into operations to increase lethality and survivability of platforms and systems.

== History ==
=== World War II ===
==== Organization and training in the United States ====
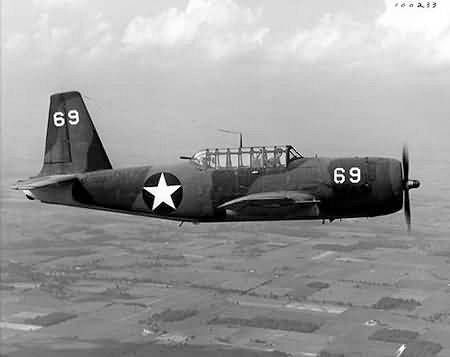
Vultee Vengeance in Flight (Note: Note the Royal Air Force camouflage, but American national markings.)

The squadron was first activated at Bowman Field, Kentucky as the 388th Bombardment Squadron. It was one of the four original squadrons of the 312th Bombardment Group. It was equipped with Vultee V-72 Vengeances, which had been ordered for the Royal Air Force, but had been pressed into service for units of the Army Air Forces. The squadron also received Douglas A-24 Banshees, and from July 1942, it trained as a dive bomber unit. In 1943, the squadron began to operate North American A-36 Apaches. In addition to training, from December 1942 to January 1943, the squadron flew antisubmarine warfare missions from Hunter Field, Georgia.

The squadron moved to Rice Army Air Field, California in April 1943, where it supported Army maneuvers with the Desert Training Center. In August, it moved to Salinas Army Air Base, California and prepared for overseas movement, departing for the Southwest Pacific Theater in late October 1943. (Note: In August 1943, AAF single engine bombardment units were redesignated fighter bomber units. The 312th Group and its component squadron appear to be the only such units to retain their bombardment designation. See Maurer, Combat Squadrons, pp. 591–639 (fighter-bomber squadrons) and their parent groups in Maurer, Combat Units.)

==== Combat in the Southwest Pacific ====
A-20 Havoc attacking a Japanese ship near New Guinea

The squadron arrived in New Guinea at the end of November 1943. It equipped with Curtiss P-40 Warhawks and flew patrol and escort missions until February 1944, when it began to equip with Douglas A-20 Havocs. From bases in New Guinea, it attacked airfields, bridges, artillery batterys, troop concentrations and warehouses in the northern and western parts of New Guinea. It supported amphibious landings in New Guinea and Palau.

In November 1944, the squadron advanced to Tanauan Airfield on Leyte in the Philippines. It provided air support for ground troops and attacked airfields and transportation facilities. From 25 March to 4 April 1945, it conducted a series eight strikes against butenol plants on Formosa (Taiwan), for which it received a Distinguished Unit Citation.

The squadron moved to Yontan Airfield, Okinawa three days before V-J Day. It remained on Okinawa until December when it returned to the United States, where it was inactivated upon its arrival at the Port of Embarkation on 6 January 1946.

=== Reserve operations ===
The squadron was activated at Ellington Field, Texas in July 1947 as a unit of the reserve. It was briefly assigned directly to Tenth Air Force before returning to the control of the 312th Group. Its training was supervised by the 175th AAF Base Unit (later the 2591st Air Force Reserve Training Center) of Air Defense Command (ADC). In 1948 Continental Air Command assumed responsibility for managing reserve and Air National Guard units from ADC.

As the post war Air Force took shape, the National Guard was considered the first line of reserve. Reserve units got what was left over after National Guard units received facilities, equipment and aircraft. Aircraft were allotted to reserve units as a means of maintaining flying proficiency, not combat readiness. Aircraft assigned to the reserves were overwhelmingly trainers, with a few fighters, and no heavy bombers were ever assigned. The allotment of units to the reserves was made only for planning purposes and mobilization plans called for personnel assigned to the units to be called to active duty during mobilization as individuals, not as units.

President Truman’s reduced 1949 defense budget required reductions in the number of units in the Air Force. The Air Force reorganized its operational reserve forces into 25 wings located at 23 reserve training centers, a reduction of 18 training centers. Since the Air Force did not have the resources to support medium or heavy bomber reserve units, the squadron was inactivated in June 1949.

=== Cold War fighter operations ===
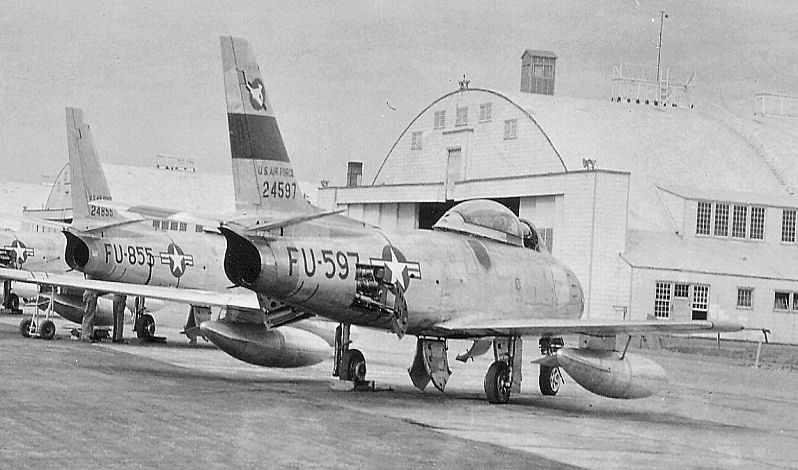
F-86 Sabres at Clovis AFB

The squadron was redesignated the 388th Fighter-Bomber Squadron and activated at Clovis Air Force Base, New Mexico in October 1954. The 312th Group initially received Republic F-84 Thunderjets,, but in 1955, the squadron equipped with North American F-86 Sabres. It trained for fighter bomber operations with conventional weapons until September, when it began training for operations with nuclear weapons. The squadron replaced its Sabres with North American F-100 Super Sabres in 1956. From April 1956 to October 1957, the squadron and the other squadrons of the 312th Fighter-Bomber Wing rotated to bases in France.

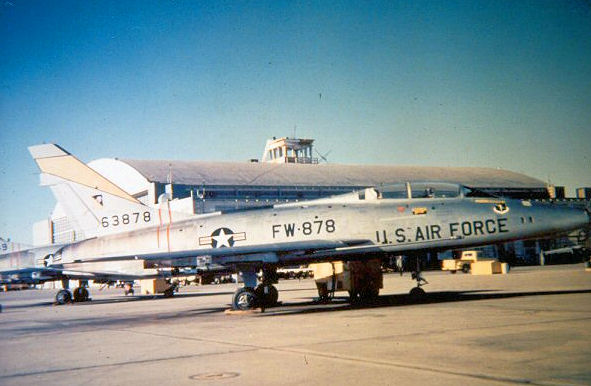
F-100F Super Sabre after transfer to 524th Tactical Fighter Squadron (Note: Aircraft is North American F-100F-10-NA Super Sabre, serial 56-3878. It was shot down by flak on 30 December 1967 over North Viet Nam. The crew ejected and were rescued by helicopter. Dirkx, Marco (23 September 2025). "1956 USAF Serial Numbers". Joe Baugher’s Serial Number List.)

In October 1957, the 312th Group was inactivated, as the 312th Fighter-Bomber Wing reorganized under the dual deputy system, and the squadron was assigned directly to the 312th Wing. It was inactivated on 18 February 1959, when the 312th Wing was inactivated and replaced by the 27th Tactical Fighter Wing. The mission, personnel and equipment of the squadron were transferred to the 524th Tactical Fighter Squadron, which moved to Cannon Air Force Base without personnel or equipment the same day.

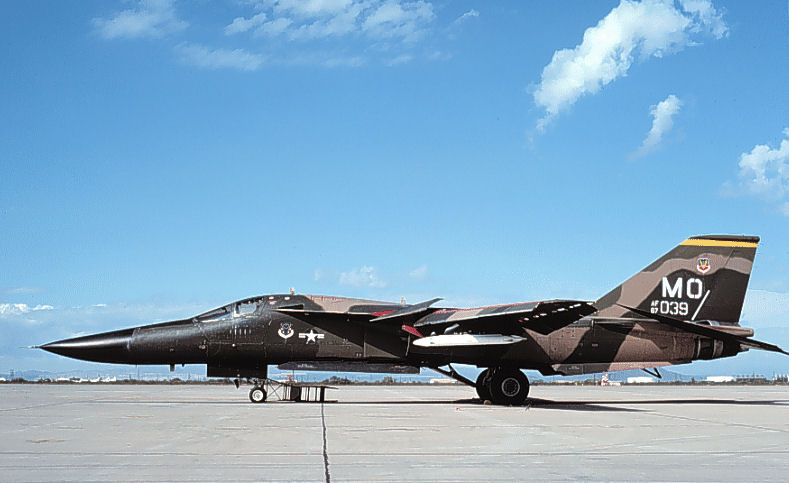
Squadron F-111A (Note: Aircraft is F-111A, serial 67-0039.)

The squadron was redesignated the 388th Tactical Fighter Training Squadron and activated at Mountain Home Air Force Base, Idaho as part of the 366th Tactical Fighter Wing in July 1977. The squadron trained aircrews on the General Dynamics F-111 Aardvark until it was inactivated in September 1979.

=== Electronic warfare ===
The squadron was redesignated the 388th Electronic Combat Squadron and again activated at Mountain Home in July 1981. It was equipped with the EF-111A Raven electronic warfare aircraft and again assumed a training mission. The squadron inactivated in December 1982, when it transferred its mission, personnel and equipment to the 390th Electronic Combat Squadron, which was simultaneously activated.

When the Navy and Air Force combined their electronic warfare training, the squadron was activated at Whidbey Island Naval Air Station, Washington in December 2004. It flew Navy Grumman EA-6B Prowler electronic warfare aircraft. The squadron was inactivated in 2010, being replaced by the 390th Electronic Combat Squadron, which moved on paper from Mountain Home to assume the 388th's assets.

The squadron was redesignated the 388th Electronic Warfare Squadron and activated in May 2024 at Eglin Air Force Base, Florida.

== Lineage ==
- Constituted as the 388th Bombardment Squadron (Light) on 28 January 1942

Activated on 15 March 1942
Redesignated 388th Bombardment Squadron (Dive) on 27 July 1942
Redesignated 388th Bombardment Squadron (Light) on 6 December 1943
Redesignated 388th Bombardment Squadron, Light c. 28 March 1944
Redesignated 388th Bombardment Squadron, Heavy on 19 July 1945
Inactivated on 4 January 1946
Redesignated 388th Bombardment Squadron, Very Heavy on 14 July 1947
Activated in the reserve on 30 July 1947
Inactivated on 27 June 1949
Redesignated 388th Fighter-Bomber Squadron on 29 July 1954
Activated on 1 October 1954
Redesignated 388th Tactical Fighter Squadron on 1 July 1958
Inactivated on 18 February 1959
Redesignated 388th Tactical Fighter Training Squadron on 7 February 1977
Activated on 1 July 1977
Inactivated on 30 September 1979
Redesignated 388th Electronic Combat Squadron on 29 January 1981
Activated on 1 July 1981
Inactivated on 15 December 1982
Activated on 15 December 2004
Inactivated on 27 September 2010

- Redesignated 388th Electronic Warfare Squadron

Activated 2 May 2024

=== Assignments ===
- 312th Bombardment Group, 15 March 1942 – 4 January 1946
- Tenth Air Force, 30 July 1947
- 312th Bombardment Group, 13 August 1947 – 27 June 1949
- 312th Fighter-Bomber Group, 1 October 1954
- 312th Fighter-Bomber Wing (later 312th Tactical Fighter Wing), 8 October 1957 – 18 February 1959 (attached to Air Task Force 13 (Provisional), 4 September–3 December 1958)
- 366th Tactical Fighter Wing, 1 July 1977 – 30 September 1979
- 366th Tactical Fighter Wing, 1 July 1981 – 15 December 1982
- 366th Operations Group, 15 December 2004 – 27 September 2010
- 850th Spectrum Warfare Group, 2 May 2024 – present

=== Stations ===
- Bowman Field], Kentucky, 15 March 1942
- Will Rogers Airport, Oklahoma, 12 June 1942
- Hunter Field, Georgia, 18 August 1942
- DeRidder Army Air Base, Louisiana, 18 February 1943
- Rice Army Airfield, California, 13 April 1943
- Salinas Army Air Base, California, 13 August – 24 October 1943
- Jackson Airfield (7 Mile Drome), Port Moresby, New Guinea, 30 November 1943
- Gusap Airfield, New Guinea,3 January 1944
- Nadzab Airfield Complex, New Guinea, 11 June 1944
- Hollandia Airfield Complex, Netherlands East Indies, 4 July 1944
- Tanauan Airfield, Leyte, Philippines Commonwealth, 19 November 1944
- McGuire Field, San Jose, Occidental Mindoro, Philippines, 27 January 1945
- Mangaldan Airfield, Luzon, Philippines, c. 11 February 1945
- Floridablanca Airfield, Luzon, Philippines, 20 April 1945
- Yontan Airfield, Okinawa, c. 12 August – 13 December 1945
- Fort Lawton, Washington, 1–4 January 1946
- Ellington Field (later Ellington Air Force Base), Texas, 30 July 1947 – 27 June 1949
- Clovis Air Force Base (later Cannon Air Force Base), New Mexico, 1 October 1954 – 18 February 1959 (deployed to Chiayi Air Base, Formosa, 4 September-3 December 1958)
- Mountain Home Air Force Base, Idaho, 1 July 1977 – 30 September 1979
- Mountain Home Air Force Base, Idaho, 1 July 1981 – 15 December 1982
- Whidbey Island Naval Air Station, Washington, 15 December 2004 – 27 September 2010
- Eglin Air Force Base, Florida, 2 May 2024 – present

=== Aircraft ===
- Vultee A-31 Vengeance, 1942–1943
- Douglas A-24 Banshee, 1942–1943
- North American A-36 Apache, 1943
- Curtiss P-40 Warhawk, 1943–1944
- Douglas A-20 Havoc, 1944–1945
- North American F-86 Sabre, 1955–1956
- North American F-100 Super Sabre, 1956–1959.
- General Dynamics F-111A Aardvark, 1977–1979.
- General Dynamics EF-111A Raven, 1981–1982.
- Grumman EA-6B Prowler, 2004–2010

=== Awards and campaigns ===
Award streamer	Award	Dates	Notes
	Presidential Unit Citation	25 March 1945–4 April 1945	Formosa, 388th Bombardment Squadron
	Air Force Outstanding Unit Award	1 July 1977–27 March 1978	388th Tactical Fighter Training Squadron
	Philippine Republic Presidential Unit Citation	17 October 1944–4 July 1945	388th Bombardment Squadron

Campaign Streamer	Campaign	Dates	Notes
	Antisubmarine	c. December 1942–c. February 1943	388th Bombardment Squadron
	New Guinea	30 November 1943–31 December 1944	388th Bombardment Squadron
	Leyte	17 October 1944–1 July 1945	388th Bombardment Squadron
	Luzon	15 December 1944–4 July 1945	388th Bombardment Squadron
	Western Pacific	17 April 1945–2 September 1945	388th Bombardment Squadron

== See also ==
- List of United States Air Force electronic combat squadrons
- List of United States Air Force electronic warfare squadrons
- List of F-100 units of the United States Air Force
- List of F-86 Sabre units
- List of Douglas A-20 Havoc operators

== External link ==
- No byline (2026). "388th Bombardment Squadron (388 BS)". Pacific Wrecks.
