= 387th Tactical Fighter Squadron =

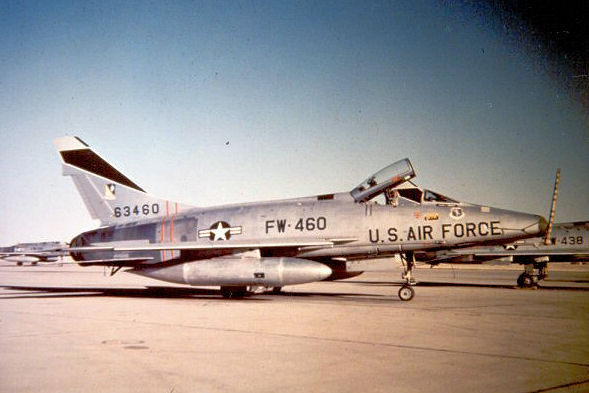
- F-100D Super Sabre as flown by the squadron (Note: Aircraft is North American F-100D-85-NH Super Sabre, serial 56-3460. It was assigned to the 523d Tactical Fighter Squadron at time of photo.)
- Active: 1942–1946; 1947–1949; 1954–1959
- Country: United States
- Branch: United States Air Force
- Role: bombardment, fighter-bomber
- Nickname: Screaming Hawks (1955-1959)
- Engagements: Southwest Pacific Theater
- Decorations: Distinguished Unit Citation; Philippine Presidential Unit Citation

Insignia
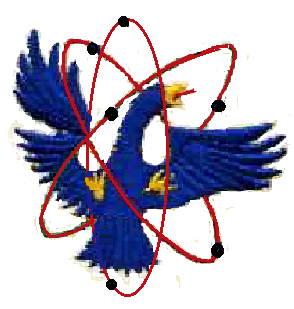
- 387 Fighter-Bomber Sq emblem (Note: Approved 5 December 1955. Description: Within three black and red electonic rings, representing an atomic symbol, an Air Force [blue] screaming hawk, wings elevated, feet and head markings of the second [color], claws, beak, tail markings and all outline detail of th first [color].)

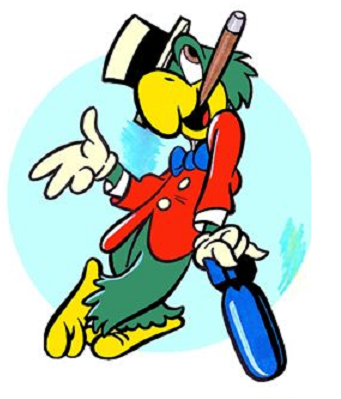
- 387 Bombardment Sq emblem (Note: Approved 27 October 1943. José Carioca.)

The 387th Tactical Fighter Squadron is an inactive United States Air Force unit. Its last assignment was with the 312th Tactical Fighter Wing, at Cannon Air Force Base, New Mexico, where it was inactivated on 18 February 1959.

The squadron was first activated in 1942 as the 387th Bombardment Squadron It trained and engaged in maneuvers until 1943, when it deployed to the Southwest Pacific Theater. It engaged in combat as a light bomber unit until the summer of 1945, earning a Distinguished Unit Citation and a Philippine Presidential Unit Citation. It returned to the United States for inactivation in 1946. It was active in the reerves from 1947 to 1949, but was not fully manned or equipped as a combat unit.

The squadron was activated again in 1954 as the 387th Fighter-Bomber Squadron. It trained for conventional and nuclear operations and rotated to bases in France. In 1959, it was inactivated and transferred its resources to another unit.

== History ==
=== World War II ===
==== Organization and training in the United States ====
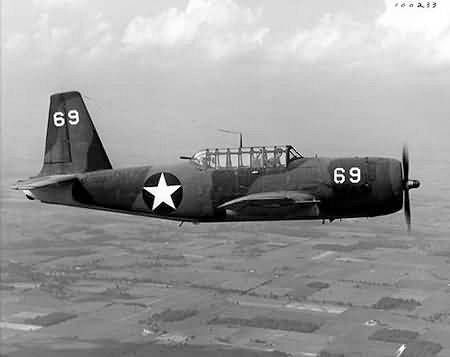
Vultee Vengeance in Flight (Note: Note the Royal Air Force camouflage, but American national markings.)

The squadron was first activated at Bowman Field, Kentucky as the 387th Bombardment Squadron. It was one of the four original squadrons of the 312th Bombardment Group. It was equipped with Vultee V-72 Vengeances, which had been ordered for the Royal Air Force, but had been pressed into service for units of the Army Air Forces. The squadron also received Douglas A-24 Banshees, and from July 1942, it trained as a dive bomber unit. In 1943, the squadron began to operate North American A-36 Apaches. In addition to training, from December 1942 to February 1943, the squadron flew antisubmarine warfare missions from Hunter Field, Georgia.

The squadron moved to Rice Army Air Field, California in April 1943, where it supported Army maneuvers with the Desert Training Center. In August, it moved to Salinas Army Air Base, California and prepared for overseas movement, departing for the Southwest Pacific Theater in late October 1943. (Note: In August 1943, AAF single engine bombardment units were redesignated fighter bomber units. The 312th Group and its component squadron appear to be the only such units to retain their bombardment designation. See Maurer, Combat Squadrons, pp. 591–639 (fighter-bomber squadrons) and their parent groups in Maurer, Combat Units.)

==== Combat in the Southwest Pacific ====
A-20 Havoc attacking a Japanese ship near New Guinea

The squadron arrived in New Guinea at the end of November 1943. It equipped with Curtiss P-40 Warhawks and flew patrol and escort missions until February 1944, when it began to equip with Douglas A-20 Havocs. From bases in New Guinea, it attacked airfields, bridges, artillery batterys, troop concentrations and warehouses in the northern and western parts of New Guinea. It supported amphibious landings in New Guinea and Palau.

In November 1944, the squadron advanced to Tanauan Airfield on Leyte in the Philippines. It provided air support for ground troops and attacked airfields and transportation facilities. From 25 March to 4 April 1945, it conducted a series eight strikes against butenol plants on Formosa (Taiwan), for which it received a Distinguished Unit Citation.

The squadron moved to Yontan Airfield, Okinawa three days before V-J Day. It remained on Okinawa until December when it returned to the United States, where it was inactivated upon its arrival at the Port of Embarkation on 6 January 1946.

=== Reserve operations ===
The squadron was activated at Ellington Field, Texas in July 1947 as a unit of the reserve. It was briefly assigned directly to Tenth Air Force before returning to the control of the 312th Group. Its training was supervised by the 175th AAF Base Unit (later the 2591st Air Force Reserve Training Center) of Air Defense Command (ADC). In 1948 Continental Air Command assumed responsibility for managing reserve and Air National Guard units from ADC.

As the post war Air Force took shape, the National Guard was considered the first line of reserve. Reserve units got what was left over after National Guard units received facilities, equipment and aircraft. Aircraft were allotted to reserve units as a means of maintaining flying proficiency, not combat readiness. Aircraft assigned to the reserves were overwhelmingly trainers, with a few fighters, and no heavy bombers were ever assigned. The allotment of units to the reserves was made only for planning purposes and mobilization plans called for personnel assigned to the units to be called to active duty during mobilization as individuals, not as units.

President Truman’s reduced 1949 defense budget required reductions in the number of units in the Air Force. The Air Force reorganized its operational reserve forces into 25 wings located at 23 reserve training centers, a reduction of 18 training centers. Since the Air Force did not have the resources to support medium or heavy bomber reserve units, the squadron was inactivated in June 1949.

=== Cold War fighter operations ===
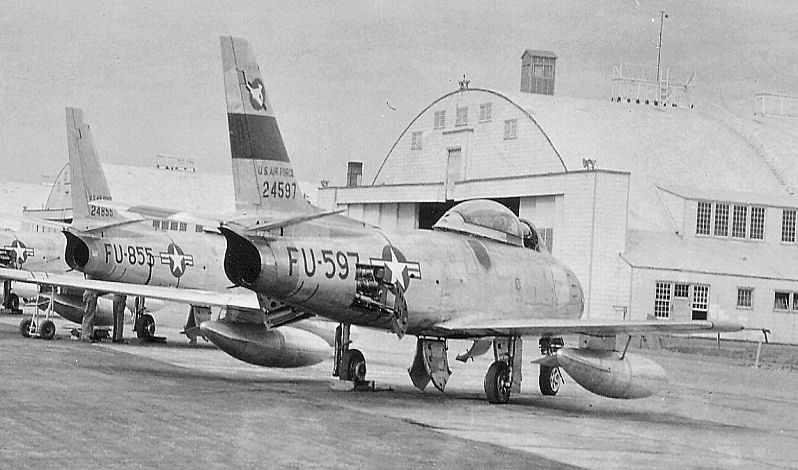
F-86 Sabres at Clovis AFB

The squadron was redesignated the 387th Fighter-Bomber Squadron and activated at Clovis Air Force Base, New Mexico in October 1954. The 312th Group initially received Republic F-84 Thunderjets,, but in 1955, the squadron equipped with North American F-86 Sabres. It trained for fighter bomber operations with conventional weapons until September, when it began training for operations with nuclear weapons. The squadron replaced its Sabres with North American F-100 Super Sabres in 1956. From April 1956 to October 1957, the squadron and the other squadrons of the 312th Fighter-Bomber Wing rotated to bases in France.

In October 1957, the 312th Group was inactivated, as the 312th Fighter-Bomber Wing reorganized under the dual deputy system, and the squadron was assigned directly to the 312th Wing. It was inactivated on 18 February 1959, when the 312th Wing was inactivated and replaced by the 27th Tactical Fighter Wing. The mission, personnel and equipment of the squadron were transferred to the 523d Tactical Fighter Squadron, which moved to Cannon Air Force Base without personnel or equipment the same day.

== Lineage ==
- Constituted as the 387th Bombardment Squadron (Light) on 28 January 1942

Activated on 15 March 1942
Redesignated 387th Bombardment Squadron (Dive) on 27 July 1942
Redesignated 387th Bombardment Squadron, Light on 6 December 1943
Redesignated 387th Bombardment Squadron, Heavy on 19 July 1945
Inactivated on 18 December 1945
Redesignated 387th Bombardment Squadron, Very Heavy on 14 July 1947
Activated in the reserve on 30 July 1947
Inactivated on 27 June 1949
Redesignated 387th Fighter-Bomber Squadron on 29 July 1954
Activated on 1 October 1954
Redesignated 387th Tactical Fighter Squadron on 1 July 1958
Inactivated on 18 February 1959

=== Assignments ===
- 312th Bombardment Group, 15 March 1942 – 18 December 1945
- Tenth Air Force, 30 July 1947
- 312th Bombardment Group, 13 August 1947 – 27 June 1949
- 312th Fighter-Bomber Group, October 1954
- 312th Fighter-Bomber Wing (later 312th Tactical Fighter Wing), 8 October 1957 – 18 February 1959

=== Stations ===
- Bowman Field, Kentucky, 15 March 1942
- Will Rogers Field, Oklahoma, 12 June 1942
- Hunter Field, Georgia, 18 August 1942
- DeRidder Army Air Base, Louisiana, 18 February 1943
- Rice Army Air Field, California, 13 April 1943
- Salinas Army Air Base, California, 13 August – 24 October 1943
- Jackson Airfield (7 Mile Drome), Port Moresby, New Guinea, c. 1 December 1943
- Gusap Airfield, New Guinea, c. 25 December 1943
- Nadzab Airfield Complex, New Guinea, c. 10 June 1944
- Hollandia Airfield Complex, Netherlands East Indies, c. 10 July 1944
- Tanauan Airfield, Leyte, Philippines, 19 November 1944
- McGuire Field, Mindoro, Philippines, c. 25 January 1945
- Mangaldan Airfield, Luzon, Philippines, 10 February 1945
- Floridablanca Airfield, Luzon, Philippines, 16 April 1945
- Yontan Airfield, Okinawa, 12 August – 13 December 1945
- Vancouver, Washington, 3–6 January 1946
- Ellington Field, Texas, 30 July 1947 – 27 June 1949
- Clovis Air Force Base (Later Cannon Air Force Base), New Mexico, 1 October 1954 – 18 February 1959

=== Aircraft ===
- Vultee V-72 Vengeance, 1942–1943
- Douglas A-24 Banshee, 1942–1943
- North American A-36 Apache, 1943
- Curtiss P-40 Warhawk, 1943–1944
- Douglas A-20 Havoc, 1944–1945
- North American F-86 Sabre, 1955–1956
- North American F-100 Super Sabre, 1956–1959

=== Awards and campaigns ===
Award streamer	Award	Dates	Notes
	Presidential Unit Citation	25 March 1945–4 April 1945	Formosa, 387th Bombardment Squadron
	Philippine Republic Presidential Unit Citation	17 October 1944–4 July 1945	387th Bombardment Squadron

Campaign Streamer	Campaign	Dates	Notes
	Antisubmarine	c. December 1942–c. February 1943	387th Bombardment Squadron
	New Guinea	30 November 1943–31 December 1944	387th Bombardment Squadron
	Leyte	17 October 1944–1 July 1945	387th Bombardment Squadron
	Luzon	15 December 1944–4 July 1945	387th Bombardment Squadron
	Western Pacific	17 April 1945–2 September 1945	387th Bombardment Squadron

== See also ==
- List of Douglas A-20 Havoc operators
- List of F-86 Sabre units
- List of F-100 units of the United States Air Force

== External link ==
- No byline (2026). "387th Bombardment Squadron (387 BS)". Pacific Wrecks.
