= 18 August 1945 air combat over Tokyo area =

A B-32 Dominator at Yontan Airfield in Okinawa during 1945

On 18 August 1945, two B-32 Dominators flew a photo recon mission over Tokyo to monitor Japanese compliance with the ceasefire. The mission was followed by a Japanese attack on three B-32s the previous day, and was intended to determine whether those attacks were isolated actions or an indication of continued Japanese resistance.

The two aircraft, Hobo Queen II, commanded by First Lieutenant James Klein, and a second Dominator commanded by First Lieutenant John R. Anderson, reached Tokyo without opposition and completed their photo runs. Soon afterward, Japanese aircraft took off from Yokosuka Naval Airfield to intercept them.

Klein, flying at about 20,000 feet, faced trouble first, while Anderson was about 10,000 feet below. Anderson's tail gunner, Sergeant John Houston, opened fire on approaching fighters, hitting one at close range and watching it explode. Other gunners also engaged the attackers, with Sergeants Jimmie Smart, Benjamin Clayworth and Burton Keller reporting another fighter destroyed.

A Japanese fighter led by Sadamu Komachi attacked Anderson's B-32 from above and disabled its left inboard engine, wounding Smart with fragments. Staff Sergeant Joseph Lacharite was also struck by cannon fire on both legs.

While attempting to help Lacharite, Sergeant Anthony J. Marchione was struck by a 20 mm cannon round, knocking him against the opposite side of the cockpit. Second Lieutenant Kurt Rupke attempted to treat Marchione's wounds, but he died around 30 minutes after being hit during the return flight to Okinawa.

The two B-32s escaped by diving toward the sea, allowing them to increase their speed beyond that of the Japanese fighters. Both aircraft returned to Yontan Airfield shortly after 6 p.m.

The engagement was the last air combat of World War II. Marchione, who was less than a month short of his 20th birthday, was the last American killed in air combat during the war.
