= List of United States Air Force electronic combat squadrons =

The mission of a United States Air Force electronic combat squadron is to use the electromagnetic spectrum (EM spectrum) to attack an enemy, or impede enemy actions by denying the use of the EM spectrum, whilst ensuring friendly forces free access to it. Electronic warfare can target humans, communication, radar, or other assets (military and civilian). This list contains squadrons inactive, active, and historical.

== List ==
Squadron	Shield	Location	Note
41st Electronic Combat Squadron		Davis-Monthan AFB	"Scorpions"
42d Electronic Combat Squadron		Davis-Monthan AFB	
43d Electronic Combat Squadron		Davis-Monthan AFB	"Bats"
388th Electronic Combat Squadron		NAS Whidbey Island	Inactive
390th Electronic Combat Squadron		NAS Whidbey Island, WA	redesignated 390th Fighter Squadron; reactivated 2010—currently flying EA-18G Growlers
429th Electronic Combat Squadron		"Black Falcons"	Inactivated 1997
430th Electronic Combat Squadron			451st Air Expeditionary Group

== See also ==
- List of United States Air Force squadrons
