= Gusap Airport =

Airport in Gusap, Morobe, Papua New Guinea

- IATA: GAP; ICAO: AYGP

Summary
- Airport type: Public
- Location: Gusap, Papua New Guinea
- Elevation AMSL: 1,450 ft / 442 m
- Coordinates: 06°03′12.93″S 145°57′37.23″E

Map

Runways
Direction	Length		Surface
Direction	ft	m	Surface
03/21	5,250	1,600	Grass
- Source: World Aero Data

Gusap Airport is a general aviation airport in Morobe Province, Papua New Guinea. (IATA: GAP) located at the base of the Finisterre Range. It has no scheduled commercial airline service. It is currently in use, and maintained by Ramu Agri Industries Ltd. (RAIL) for Crop Dusting purposes (Aerial Spraying on Sugar Cane and other agricultural crops).

== History ==
Gusap Airport was built by US Army engineers of the 871st, 872nd and 875th Airborne Aviation Engineer Battalions during World War II, and was developed into major base consisting of ten airstrips and numerous facilities for fighters and light bombers of the Fifth Air Force. Later during the war, the airfield was also a base for Royal Australian Air Force aircraft. The base was built around eight grass runways, with 180 revetments in the complex. The airstrip at Gusap "paid for itself many times over in the quantity of Japanese aircraft, equipment and personnel destroyed by Allied attack missions projected from it."

Many relics from this period can be still found in the surrounding environment, and Ramu Agri Industries Limited at Gusap have established a mini-museum with restored relics for viewing. These include strip dozers, Bren Guns, 50mm Aircraft cannon, various ammunition, US & Japanese helmets and even the engine from a Japanese "Sally" Bomber recovered from the nearby mountains, on display.

=== Allied units assigned to Gusap Airfield ===
- Headquarters, 85th Fighter Wing (25 February – 24 July 1944)
- Headquarters, 310th Bombardment Wing (1 February – 6 May 1944)
- 312th Bombardment Group (1 January – June 1944)

Headquarters, 386th, 387th, 388th, 389th Bomb Squadrons, A-20 Havoc

- 35th Fighter Group (7 February – 22 July 1944)

Headquarters, 39th, 41st Fighter Squadrons, P-47 Thunderbolt

- 49th Fighter Group (20 November 1943 – 19 April 1944)

Headquarters, 7th, 8th, 9th Fighter Squadrons, P-40 Warhawk (1943), P-47 Thunderbolt (1944)

- 6th Machine Gun Battalion

== See also ==
- USAAF in the Southwest Pacific
