= Yomitan Auxiliary Airfield =

Former airfield in Yomitan, Okinawa

Yontan Airfield Yontan Air Base Yontan Auxiliary Airfield
- Okinawa, Ryukyu Islands, Japan
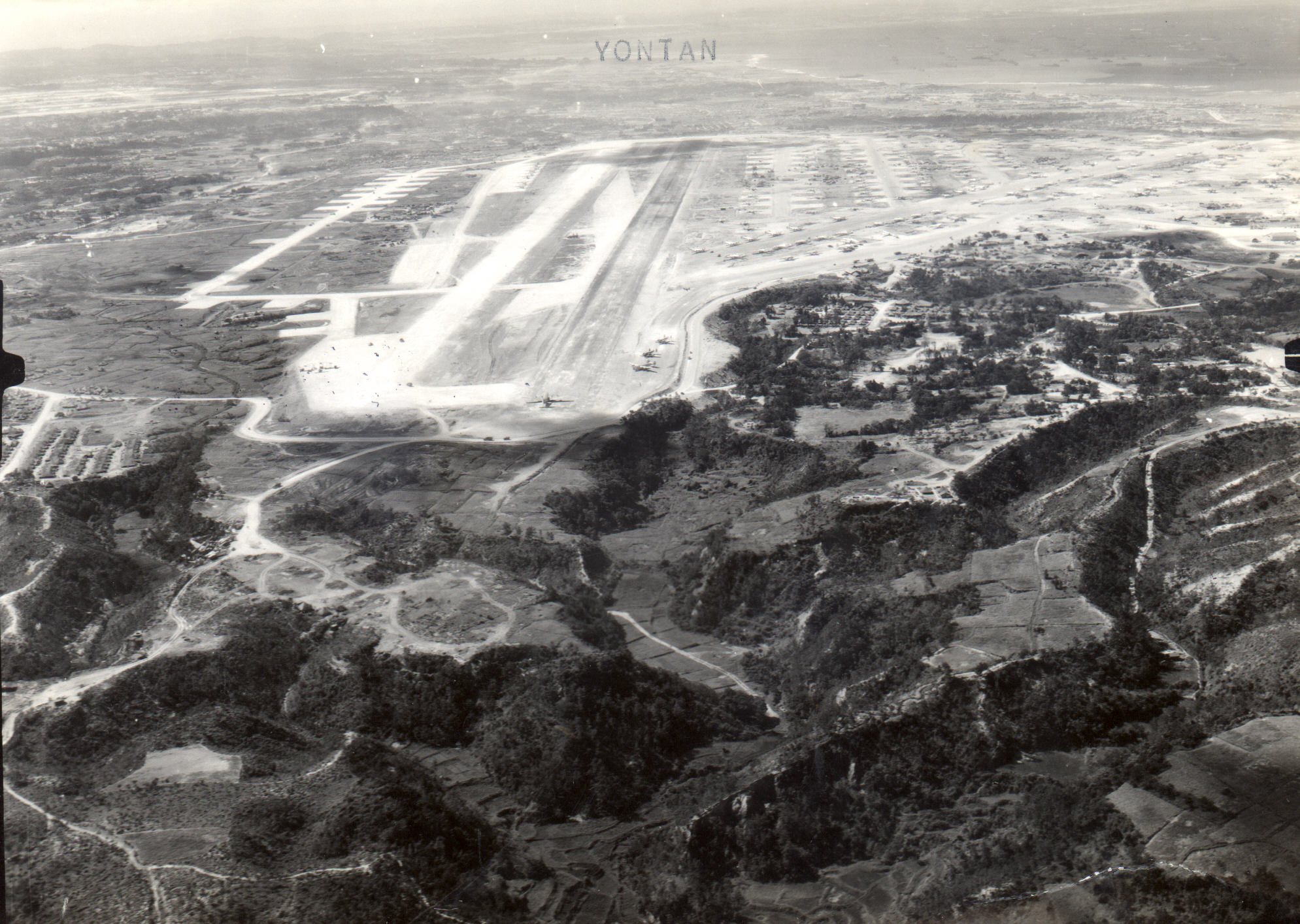
- A view of Yontan Air Field looking northeast in 1945 with the East China Sea in the background

Site information
- Type: Military airfield
- Controlled by: United States Air Force; United States Navy; United States Marine Corps

Location
- Coordinates: 26°23′37″N 127°44′48″E

Site history
- Built: 1944
- Built by: Imperial Japanese Army
- In use: 1945–2006

Yontan Airfield (also known as Yomitan Auxiliary Airfield) is a former military airfield located near Yomitan Village on the west coast of Okinawa. It was closed in July 1996 and turned over to the Japanese government in December 2006. Today it is home to the Yomitan Village Office and community complex, including baseball fields, running tracks, and community facilities.

Yontan (Yomitan) Airfield was originally established by the Imperial Japanese Army in 1944 as Kita Airfield (北飛行場, Kita Hikōjō). During the Battle of Okinawa on April 1, 1945, United States Marine Corps and United States Army forces seized the airfield on the first day of their landing. It was quickly repaired and became the first airfield on Okinawa to be used by the American forces. Later it was developed into a major American base for Army, Marine, and Navy aircraft. The Boeing B-29 Bockscar landed at Yomitan after the atomic bombing of Nagasaki.

== Postwar use ==
After 1947, there were no units permanently assigned to Yontan and the base was used as an auxiliary installation for Kadena Air Base until the mid-1950s. Later it was placed in auxiliary reserve status.

In June 1948, the 170th Airway and Air Communications Service (AACS) Squadron was activated at Yontan to provide air traffic control and communications support for USAF units in Okinawa. Shortly after, the 170th was redesignated as the 1962d AACS Squadron. The unit moved to Kadena AB and redesignated as 1962d AACS Group (later, Communications Group) on 18 February 1955.

By 1950, Yontan was redesignated as a parachute drop training facility because its runways were not suitable for large scale or jet aircraft operations. By that time, local residents were started farming at the airfield with the tacit permission of the Air Force, and there were no fences installed on the base boundaries, except in administrative area. 33 serious off-range drop accidents occurred, including the death of a girl on 2 August 1950 when a fuel tank fell into private house, and an 11 June 1965 accident in which a trailer landed off target crushing a 10-year-old girl who was playing in the family yard.

After the Okinawa reversion in 1972, the Japanese Government continued to make Yomitan Auxiliary Airfield (FAC 6027) available for USFJ requirements. Under the agreement of the 16th U.S.–Japan Security Consultative Committee in 1976, 250.78 acres of land at eastern portions of the airfield were partially returned to the Japanese Government in three release actions; 0.48 acres were released on 14 May 1977, 0.19 acres were released on 31 May 1977, and 250.11 acres were released on 30 April 1978. The remaining 191 acres were transferred from Fifth Air Force to the control of Commander Fleet Activities, Okinawa (COMFLEACTS Okinawa) on 27 July 1978. In addition, control of the Yomitan Auxiliary Airfield passed from COMFLEACTS Okinawa to Commanding General Marine Corps Base Camp Smedley D. Butler on 9 October 1980.

The last parachute drop training was conducted at Yomitan on 19 July 1996. Under the agreement of Special Action Committee on Okinawa (SACO) Final Report, the parachute drop training was relocated to Ie Jima Auxiliary Airfield (FAC 6005). Yomitan was retained as an electromagnetic interference restriction for HF/DF operations at Sobe Communication Site. With the completion of the functional relocation of Sobe Communication Site into Camp Hansen, Yomitan Auxiliary Airfield was completely returned to the Japanese Government and landowners in December 2006.

== Major USAAF units assigned to Yontan ==
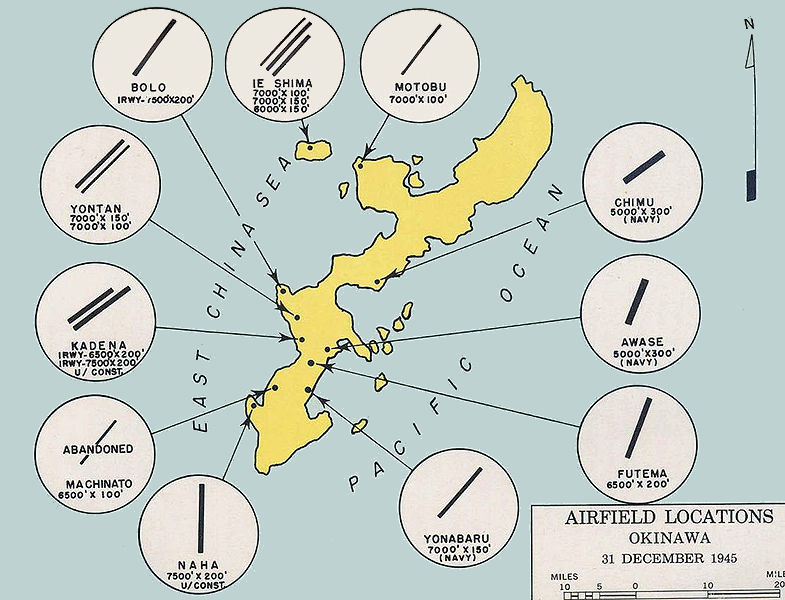
Location of Yontan Airfield

In addition to the USAAF units, Yontan Airfield hosted several Naval and Marine Corps air squadrons equipped with F4U Corsairs, PBY Catalinas and F6F Hellcats.

- Headquarters, Seventh Air Force, July 12, 1945 – January 1, 1946
- Headquarters, VII Bomber Command, July 1945 – March 1946

- Headquarters, 38th Bombardment Group

B-25 Mitchell, July 25 – November 22, 1945

71st Bombardment Squadron, July 25 – November 22, 1945
405th Bombardment Squadron, July 25 – November 21, 1945
822d Bombardment Squadron, July 25 – November 22, 1945
823d Bombardment Squadron, July 25 – November 21, 1945

- 41st Bombardment Group Seventh Air Force

B-25 Mitchell, June 7 – December 13, 1945

47th Bombardment Squadron, June 7 – December 13, 1945
48th Bombardment Squadron, June 7 – December 13, 1945
396th Bombardment Squadron, June 7 – December 13, 1945
820th Bombardment Squadron, June 7 – December 13, 1945

- 494th Bombardment Group Seventh Air Force

B-24 Liberator, June 24 – December 8, 1945

373d Bombardment Squadron, July 21 – December 15, 1945
864th Bombardment Squadron, June 24 – December 13, 1945
865th Bombardment Squadron, June 24 – December 13, 1945
866th Bombardment Squadron, June 24 – December 13, 1945
867th Bombardment Squadron, June 24 – December 13, 1945

- 35th Fighter Group Fifth Air Force

P-51 Mustang, June 28 – October 1945

39th Fighter Squadron, June 30 – October 10, 1945
40th Fighter Squadron, June 30 – October 10, 1945
41st Fighter Squadron, June 30 – October 10, 1945

- 312th Bombardment Group Fifth Air Force

A-20 Havoc August 13 – December 13, 1945

386th Bombardment Squadron, August 13 – November 28, 1945 (B-32 Dominator)
387th Bombardment Squadron, August 13 – December 13, 1945
388th Bombardment Squadron, September – December 13, 1945
389th Bombardment Squadron, September – December 9, 1945

- 413th Fighter Group, Eighth/Twentieth Air Force*

P-47 Thunderbolt January 29 – October 1946

1st Fighter Squadron, January 29 – October 15, 1946
21st Fighter Squadron, January 29 – October 15, 1946
34th Fighter Squadron, January 29 – October 15, 1946

- 507th Fighter Group, Eighth Air Force

P-47 Thunderbolt, January 29 – May 27, 1946

463d Fighter Squadron, January 29 – May 27, 1946
464th Fighter Squadron, January 29 – May 27, 1946
465th Fighter Squadron, January 29 – May 27, 1946

- 51st Fighter Group, Twentieth Air Force

P-47 Thunderbolt, October 15, 1946 – May 22, 1947

16th Fighter Squadron, 15 October 1946-22 May 1947
25th Fighter Squadron, 15 October 1946-22 May 1947
26th Fighter Squadron, 15 October 1946-22 May 1947

- 4th Fighter Squadron (All Weather) (347th Fighter Group), February 20, 1947 – August 19, 1948 (P-61 Black Widow)

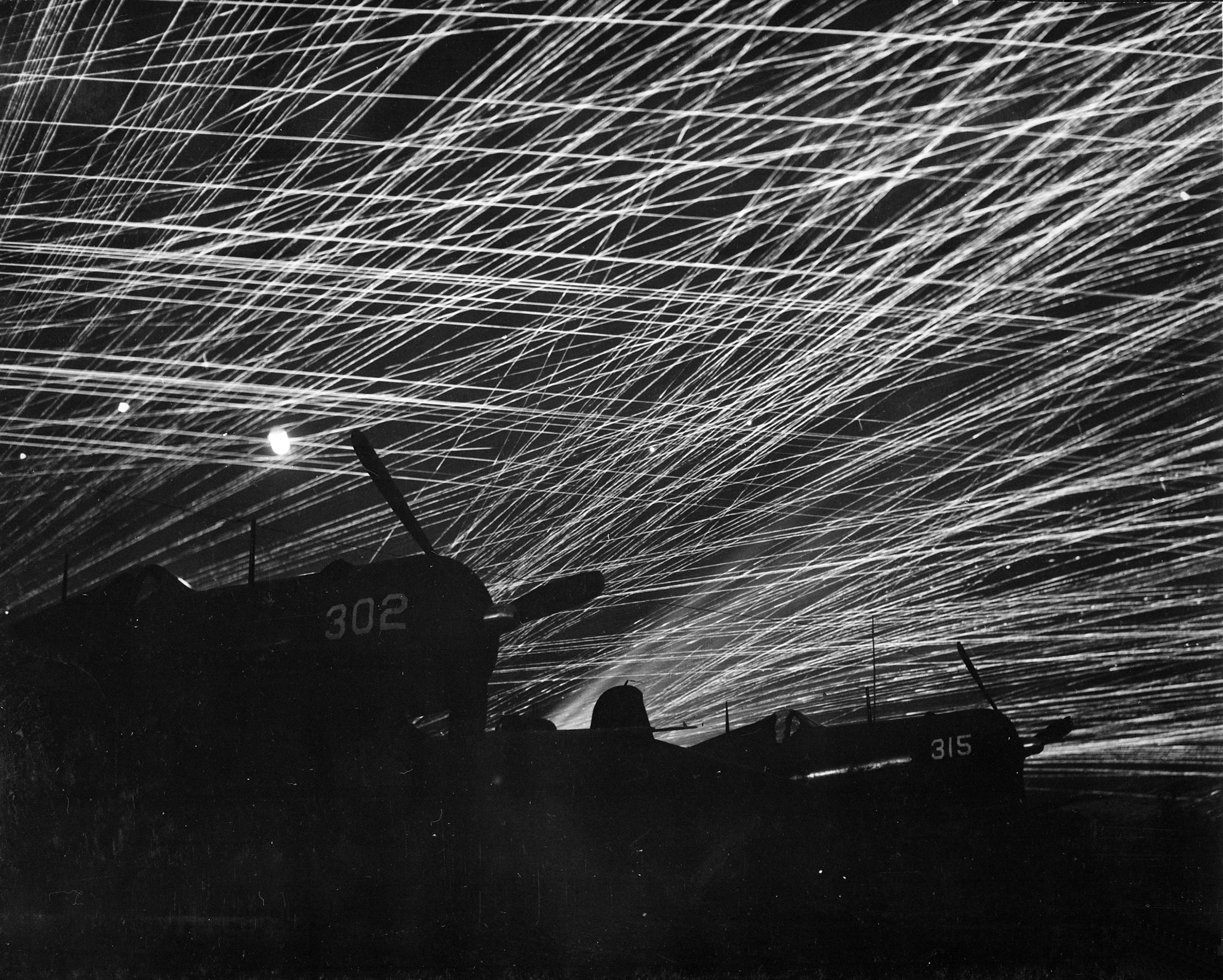
USMC Corsairs of VMF-311 at Yontan Airfield during Battle of Okinawa

- Eighth Air Force was reassigned to Mac Dill AAF, Florida on June 7, 1946. All assigned units in the Pacific were reassigned to Twentieth Air Force that date.

== See also ==
- Naval Base Okinawa
- Raid on Yontan Airfield
