= Consolidated B-32 Dominator =

American heavy bomber

B-32 Dominator
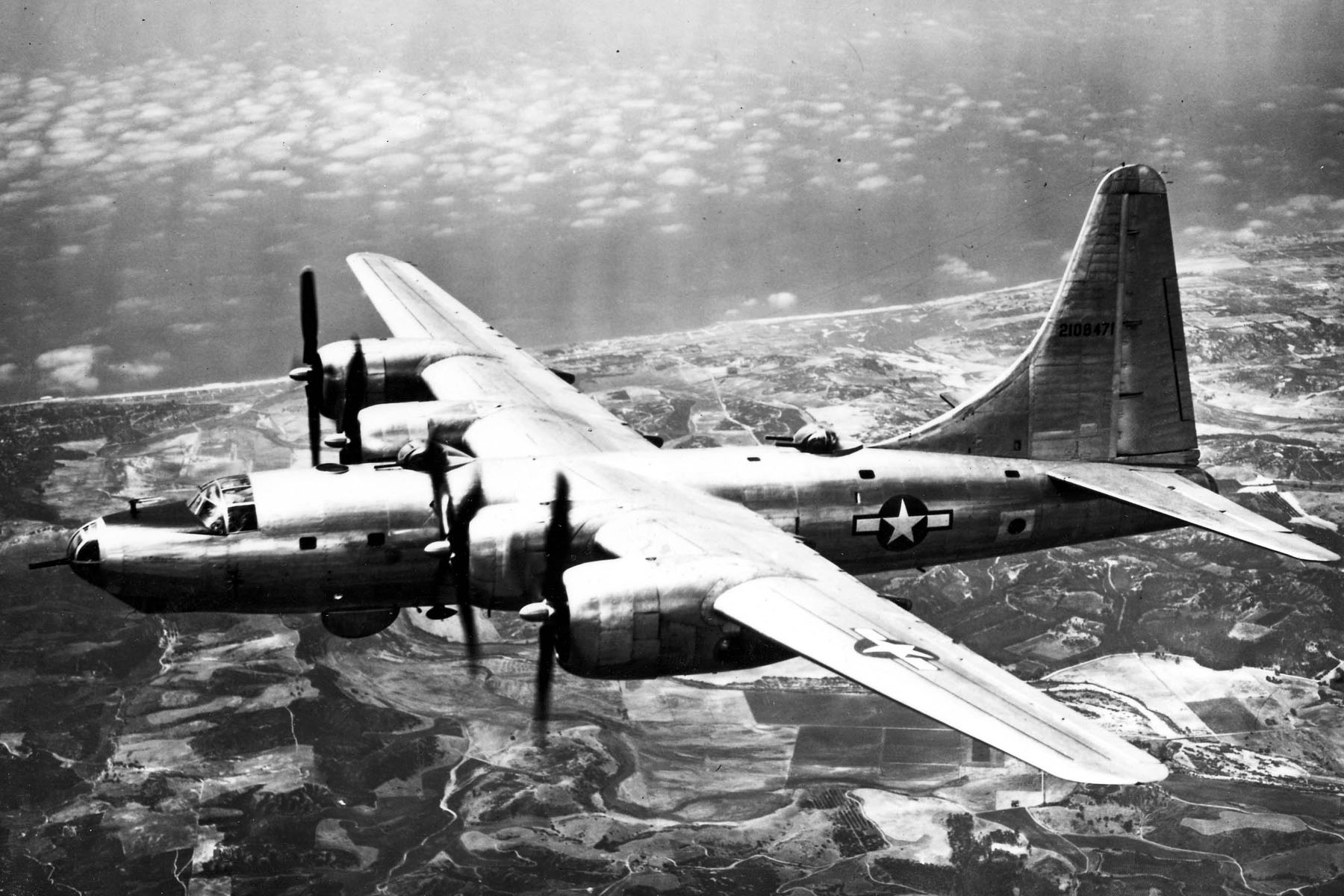
- Consolidated B-32-1-CF, the first B-32 built after modification to Block 20 standard.

General information
- Type: Heavy strategic bomber
- National origin: United States
- Manufacturer: Consolidated Aircraft
- Primary user: United States Army Air Forces
- Number built: 118

History
- Manufactured: 1944–1945
- Introduction date: 27 January 1945
- First flight: 7 September 1942
- Retired: 30 August 1945
- Developed from: Consolidated B-24 Liberator

The Consolidated B-32 Dominator (Consolidated Model 34) was an American heavy strategic bomber built for the United States Army Air Forces during World War II. A B-32 was involved in the last air combat engagement of the war, resulting in the war's last American air combat death. It was developed by Consolidated Aircraft in parallel with the Boeing B-29 Superfortress as a fallback design should the B-29 prove unsuccessful. The B-32 reached units in the Pacific only in mid-May 1945, and subsequently saw only limited combat operations against Japanese targets before the end of the war on 2 September 1945. Most of the extant orders of the B-32 were canceled shortly thereafter and only 118 B-32 airframes of all types were built.

== Design and development ==
The engineering development of the B-29 had been underway since mid-1938, when in June 1940, the United States Army Air Corps requested a similar design from the Consolidated Aircraft Company in case of development difficulties with the B-29.

The Model 33 on which Consolidated based its proposal was similar to the B-24 Liberator. Like the B-24, it was originally designed with a twin tail and a large Davis wing, but with a longer, rounder fuselage and a rounded nose. As can be seen in pictures, the B-32 also retained the B-24's tambour-panel "roller-type" bomb bay doors, which operated very much like the movable enclosure of a rolltop desk, retracted into the fuselage. These types of doors created a minimum of aerodynamic drag to keep speed high over the target area; they also allowed the bomb bays to be opened while on the ground, since its low ground clearance prevented the use of normal bomb bay doors. The powerplants were to be the same quartet of 18-cylinder, 2,200 horsepower (1,600 kW) Wright Duplex-Cyclones, as specified for B-29s. The aircraft was designed to be pressurized, and have remote-controlled retractable gun turrets with fourteen .50 in (12.7 mm) machine guns. It was to have an estimated gross weight of 101,000 lb (46,000 kg). The first contract for two XB-32s was signed on 6 September 1940, the same day as the contract for the Boeing prototype XB-29.

The first XB-32-CO, AAF s/n 41-141, was constructed next to the Army Air Forces (AAF) Base Tarrant Field Airdrome at the AAF Aircraft Plant No. 4 just west of Fort Worth, Texas, along the south side of Lake Worth. The Consolidated Vultee Bomber Plant assembly line was six months behind schedule, so the aircraft made its first flight on 7 September 1942. Due to problems with the pressurization system, the gun turrets, and landing gear doors, these items were omitted on the first prototype. The aircraft had R-3350-13 engines inboard and R-3350-21s outboard, with all four powerplants driving three-bladed propellers. The XB-32 had persistent problems with engine oil leaks and poor cooling, much like issues encountered during B-29 development. The inboard propellers' pitch could be reversed to shorten the landing roll or to roll back in ground maneuvers.

The first XB-32 was armed with eight .50 in (12.7 mm) machine guns in dorsal and ventral turrets and an odd combination of two .50 caliber and one 20 mm (0.787 in) cannon in each outboard engine nacelle firing rearwards, plus two .50 caliber machine guns in the wings outboard of the propellers. The turrets were remotely controlled from periscopic sights in aiming stations inside the aircraft. The sights were coordinated by a sophisticated analog computer system developed by Sperry Gyroscope Company.

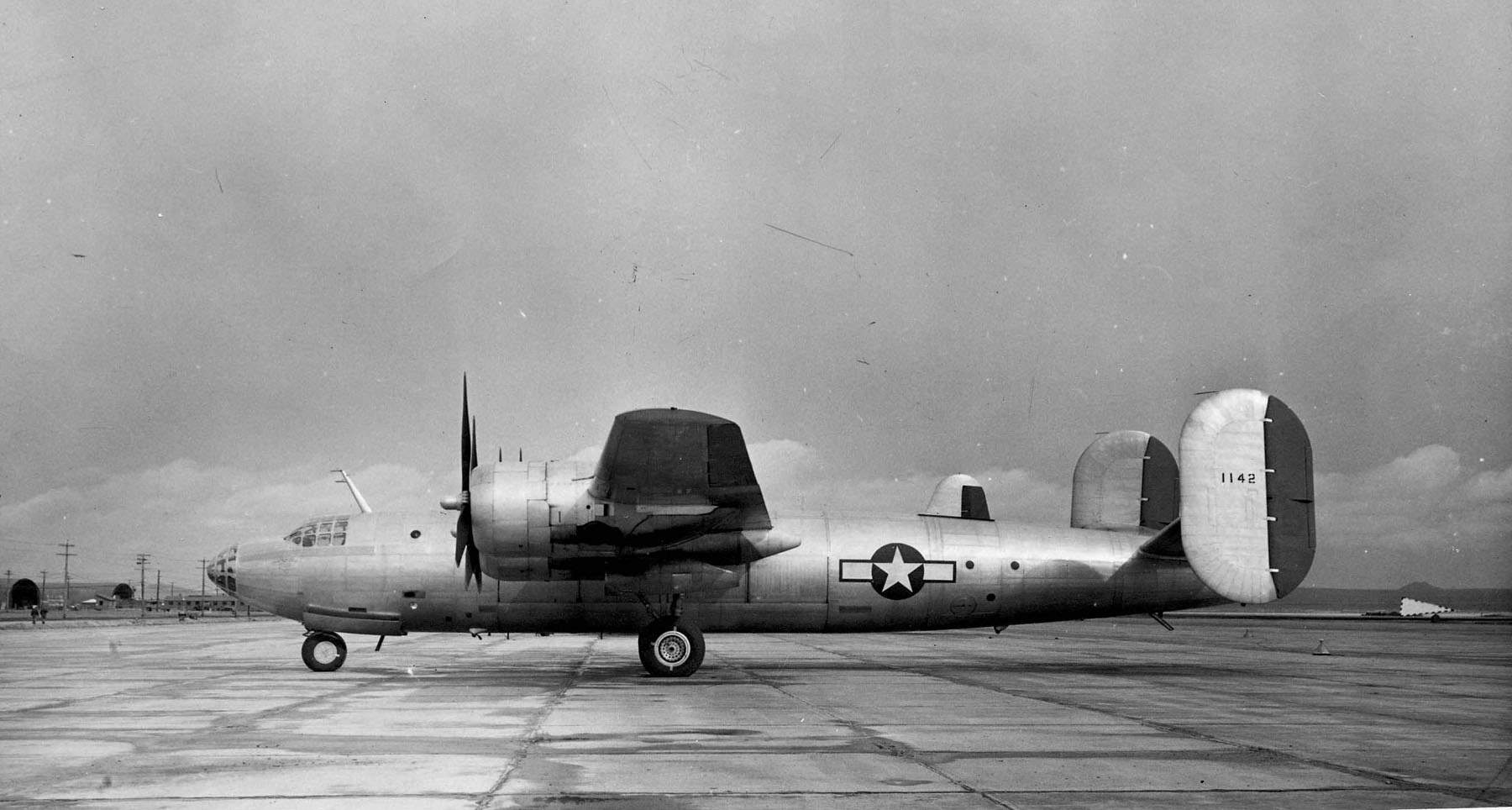
XB-32-CO 41-142 on 28 February 1944

On 17 March 1943, the initial contract was signed for 300 B-32-CFs, but development problems continued. On 10 May 1943, the first XB-32 crashed on takeoff after making a total of 30 flights before the second XB-32, s/n 41-142, finally flew on 2 July 1943. This aircraft had a traditional stepped cockpit canopy. Upon examination and testing, the USAAF recommended a large number of changes that included more conventional gun stations.

The pressurization system had problems that were never solved, so the role of the aircraft was changed to operating at low to medium altitude. This decision meant that the pressurization system was easily eliminated from production aircraft. Problems with the remote-controlled gun turrets were never solved, and the armament on production aircraft was changed to ten .50-caliber machine guns in manually operated turrets: Sperry A-17 turrets in the nose and tail, two Martin A-3F-A dorsal turrets, and one Sperry A-13-A ball turret. The bomb load was increased by 4,000 pounds (1,800 kg) to 20,000 pounds (9,100 kg).

The second XB-32 continued to have stability problems. In an attempt to resolve this, a B-29-style tail was fitted to the aircraft after its 25th flight, but this did not resolve the problem and a Consolidated-designed 19.5 ft (5.9 m) vertical tail was added and first flown on the third XB-32, s/n 41-18336, on 3 November 1943. The first production aircraft was fitted with a B-29 vertical tail until the new Consolidated tail was available for installation.

By 1944, testing of the three prototypes permitted the AAF to place orders for over 1,500 B-32s. The first production aircraft was delivered on 19 September 1944, by which time the B-29 was in combat in China. The first B-32 crashed on the same day it was delivered when the nose wheel collapsed on landing. Beginning on 27 January 1945, 40 B-32A-5, -10 and -15 aircraft were delivered as unarmed TB-32-CF crew trainers.

Originally, the AAF intended the B-32 as a "fallback" design to be used only if the B-29 program fell significantly behind in its development schedule. As development of the B-32 became seriously delayed, this plan became unnecessary due to the success of the B-29. Initial plans to use the B-32 to supplement the B-29 in re-equipping B-17 and B-24 groups before redeployment of the Eighth and Fifteenth Air Forces to the Pacific were stymied when only five production models had been delivered by the end of 1944, by which time B-29 operations were underway in the Twentieth Air Force.

== Operational history ==
The first assignment of the B-32 began when General George Kenney, the commander of Allied air forces in the South West Pacific Area and commander of the U.S. Fifth Air Force, traveled to Washington, DC, to request B-29s. Since priority had been given to strategic bombing by the B-29, Kenney's request was denied, after which he then requested the B-32.

Following a demonstration, the Army General Staff agreed that Kenney could conduct a combat evaluation, and a test schedule of 11 missions was set up, followed by a plan to re-equip two of the 312th Bomb Group's four Douglas A-20 Havoc squadrons with the B-32. Project crews took three B-32s to Clark Field, Luzon, Philippine Islands, in mid-May 1945 for a series of test flights completed on 17 June.

The three test B-32s were assigned to the 312th BG's 386th Bombardment Squadron. On 29 May 1945, the first of four combat missions by the B-32 was flown against a supply depot at Antatet in the Philippines, followed by two B-32s dropping 16 2,000 lb (910 kg) bombs on a sugar mill at Taito, Formosa, on 15 June. On 22 June, a B-32 bombed an alcohol plant at Heito, Formosa, with 500 lb (230 kg) bombs, but a second B-32 missed flak positions with its 260 lb (120 kg) fragmentation bombs. The last mission was flown on 25 June against bridges near Kiirun on Formosa.

The test crews were impressed with its unique, reversible-pitch inboard propellers and the Davis wing, which gave it excellent landing performance. However, they found a number of faults; the cockpit was noisy and had a poor instrument layout, the bombardier's vision was limited, the aircraft was overweight, and the nacelle design resulted in frequent engine fires (a deficiency shared with the B-29 Superfortress). However, the testing missions were mostly successful.

In July 1945, the 386th Bomb Squadron completed its transition to the B-32, flying six more combat missions before the war ended. On 13 August, the 386th BS moved from Luzon to Yontan Airfield on Okinawa and flew mostly photographic reconnaissance missions. On 15 August, Japan surrendered (documents signed 2 September), and the 386th's missions were intended to monitor Japan's compliance with the ceasefire and to gather information such as possible routes occupation forces could take into Tokyo. On 17 August, the B-32s were intercepted by Japanese fighters. During the two-hour engagement, the Dominators suffered only minor damage and none of their crew was injured. "Though the B-32 gunners later claimed to have damaged one fighter and 'probably destroyed' two others, surviving Japanese records list no losses for that day or next." Based on the Japanese action on 17 August, U.S. commanders felt that it was important to continue the reconnaissance missions over Tokyo so they could determine if it was an isolated incident or an indication that Japan would reject the ceasefire and continue fighting.

On 18 August 1945, four Dominators were given the task of photographing many of the targets covered on the previous day; however, mechanical problems caused two to be pulled from the flight. Over Japan, a formation of 14 A6M Zeros and three N1K2-J Shiden-Kai (George) fighters (apparently misidentified as Ki-44 Tojos by the American crews) attacked the remaining two U.S. aircraft. Saburō Sakai, a Japanese ace, said later that they were concerned that the Dominators were attacking. Another Japanese ace, Sadamu Komachi, stated in a 1978 Japanese magazine article that the fighter pilots could not bear to see American bombers flying serenely over a devastated Tokyo.

The B-32 Dominator Hobo Queen II (s/n 42-108532) was flying at 20,000 ft (6,100 m) when the Japanese fighters took off and received no significant damage. Hobo Queen II claimed two Zeros destroyed in the action, as well as a probable Shiden-Kai (though the Japanese lost no aircraft). The other Dominator was flying 10,000 ft (3,000 m) below Hobo Queen II when the fighters took off. The fighters heavily damaged that Dominator, initially wounding the dorsal gunner and then seriously wounding two other members. Photographer Staff Sergeant Joseph Lacharite was wounded in the legs (his recovery spanned several years). Sergeant Anthony Marchione, a photographer's assistant, helped Lacharite and then was fatally wounded himself. Marchione was the last American to die in air combat in World War II. Despite the damage, the Dominator returned to Okinawa. However, the incident precipitated the removal of propellers from all Japanese fighters as per the terms of the ceasefire agreement, beginning 19 August 1945. The last B-32 combat photoreconnaissance mission was completed on 28 August, during which two B-32s were destroyed in separate accidents, with 15 of the 26 crewmen killed. On 30 August, the 386th Bomb Squadron stood down from operations.

Production contracts of the B-32 were cancelled on 8 September 1945, with production ceased by 12 October. Many B-32s ended up being salvaged at Walnut Ridge, Arkansas, with a total of 38 flown to Kingman Army Airfield for disposal. The large club pip of the 386th is visible in a photo of one B-32 awaiting reclamation. Five of the Dominators taken to Kingman were from the 386th Bomb Squadron, 312th Bomb Group's overseas assignment. Along with several other noteworthy aircraft on temporary display at Davis Monthan AFB after World War II, the last surviving Dominator, B-32-1-CF #42-108474, was written off and destroyed in 1949.

== Variants ==
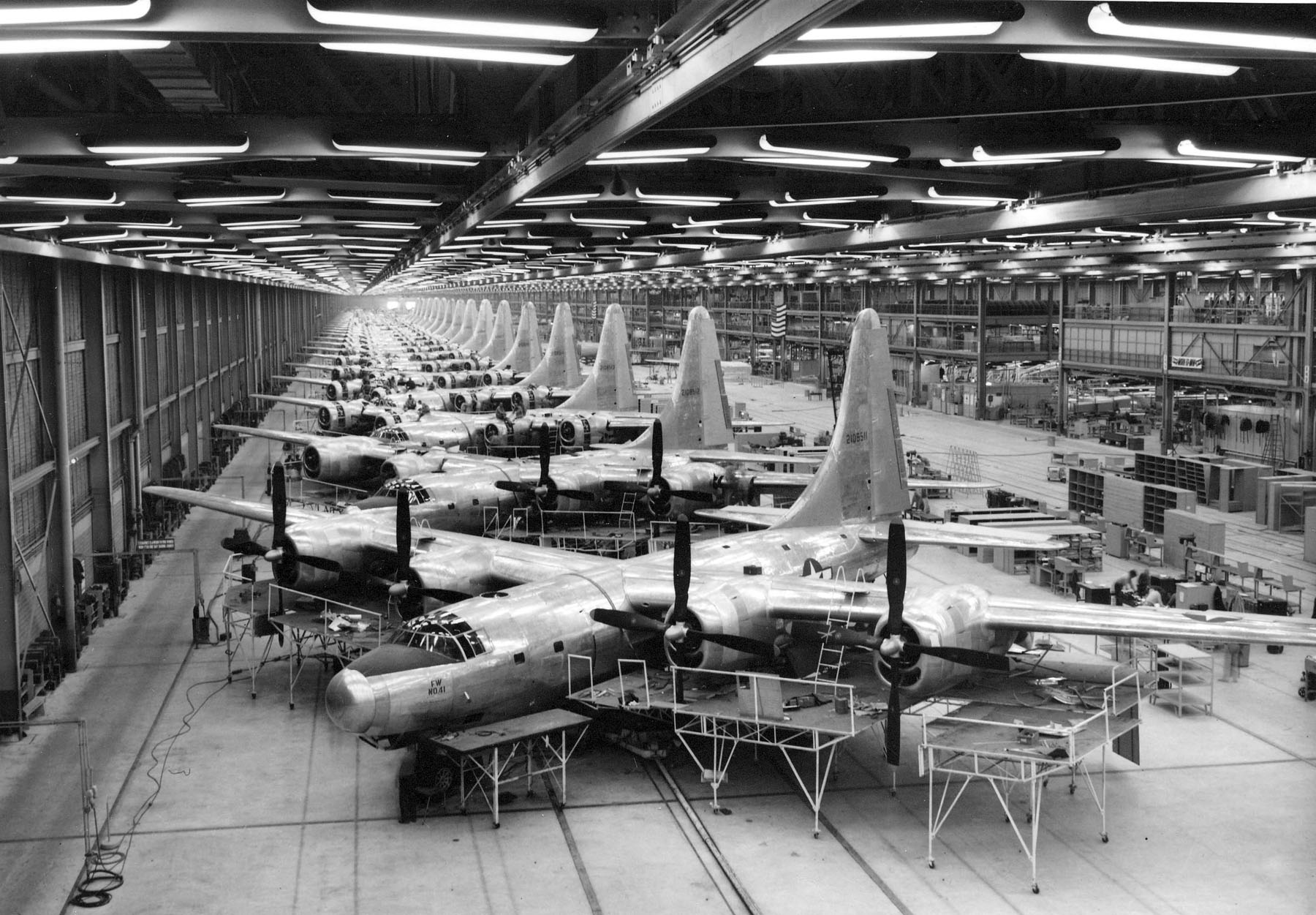
TB-32s being assembled at Consolidated's Fort Worth factory

XB-32
Company Designation Model 33, three built, on first aircraft: Wright R-3350-13 (inboard) and Wright R-3350-21 (outboard) engines, three-bladed propeller, rounded, glassed nose, first two aircraft had a twin tail configuration. Second prototype was pressurized and had remotely controlled retractable gun turrets in the dorsal ventral positions, with a manned tail "stinger". Second and third prototypes had numerous tail variations installed, including a B-29 tail installation. First flown 7 September 1942.

B-32-1-CF
Model 34 flight testing aircraft first flown 5 August 1944. Wright R-3350-23 engines. First two aircraft initially had modified B-29 tails installed. Installation of armament, single rudder tabs, radar bombing equipment (AN/APQ-5B and AN/APQ-13) and long range navigation equipment, 10 built.

B-32-5-CF
Twin rudder tabs made standard. Last 11 aircraft converted to TB-32-5CF with deletion of all armament (openings faired over), deletion of radar bombing equipment, and deletion of long range navigation equipment, 15 built.

TB-32-10-CF
Redesigned bombardier's entrance door, replacement of SCR-269-G Radio compass with AN/ARN-7 set, installation of engine fire extinguishers, 25 built.

TB-32-15-CF
Empennage de-icer boots, four built.

B-32-20-CF
Combat equipped aircraft. Pressurization system removed, scanning blister installed in rear fuselage, 21 built.

B-32-21-CF
One B-32-20-CF converted to paratroop conversion. All bombing equipment removed and benches installed in rear bomb bay and rear fuselage.

B-32-25-CF
Modified fuel system to allow auxiliary tanks in the bomb bay. AN/APN-9 LORAN, 25 built.

B-32-30-CF
Variant with a stabilized Sperry A-17A nose turret, installation of countermeasure equipment (AN/APQ-2, AN/APT-1 and AN/APT-2) and improved APQ-13A radar bombing equipment. Seven built, last three aircraft flown directly to storage and scrapped.

B-32-35-CF
Seven produced with increased ammunition; flown directly to storage and scrapped.

B-32-40-CF
A total of ten were built and flown directly to storage and then scrapped

B-32-45/50-CF
A total of 37 under construction. Partially assembled machines were stripped of all their government-furnished equipment and engines and were scrapped on site by the contractor.

B-32-1-CO
Three aircraft the same as the B-32-20-CF but assembled by Consolidated – San Diego. One aircraft accepted with the remaining two units flown directly to storage and scrapped.

A total of 300 B-32s ordered, 118 delivered, 130 flyable, 170 cancelled, orders for a further 1,099 B-32-CFs and 499 B-32-COs were cancelled after VJ-Day.

== Operators ==
United States

- United States Army Air Forces
  - 386th Bombardment Squadron (Heavy)
  - 312th Bombardment Group

== Surviving aircraft ==
No complete examples of a B-32 remain today. The XB-32 (AAF Ser. No. 41-18336) survived until 1952 as a ground instructional airframe for fire fighting training at McClellan Air Force Base. Others were written off after suffering major damage in operational accidents. Excess inventories were flown either to Walnut Ridge Army Airfield, Arkansas, to be scrapped by the Texas Railway Equipment Company, or to Kingman Army Airfield, Arizona to be scrapped by the Wunderlich Construction Company.

One of the few portions of a B-32 surviving is a wing panel removed from a static test model and erected at the Montgomery Memorial near San Diego, California as a monument to aviation pioneer John J. Montgomery.

Several Sperry A-17 nose/tail turrets, unique to the B-32, survive in various U.S. locations. These included the National Air and Space Museum, the National Museum of the U.S. Air Force, the Commemorative Air Force, the National Warplane Museum in Geneseo, New York and at least four others in private collections.

== Specifications (B-32) ==
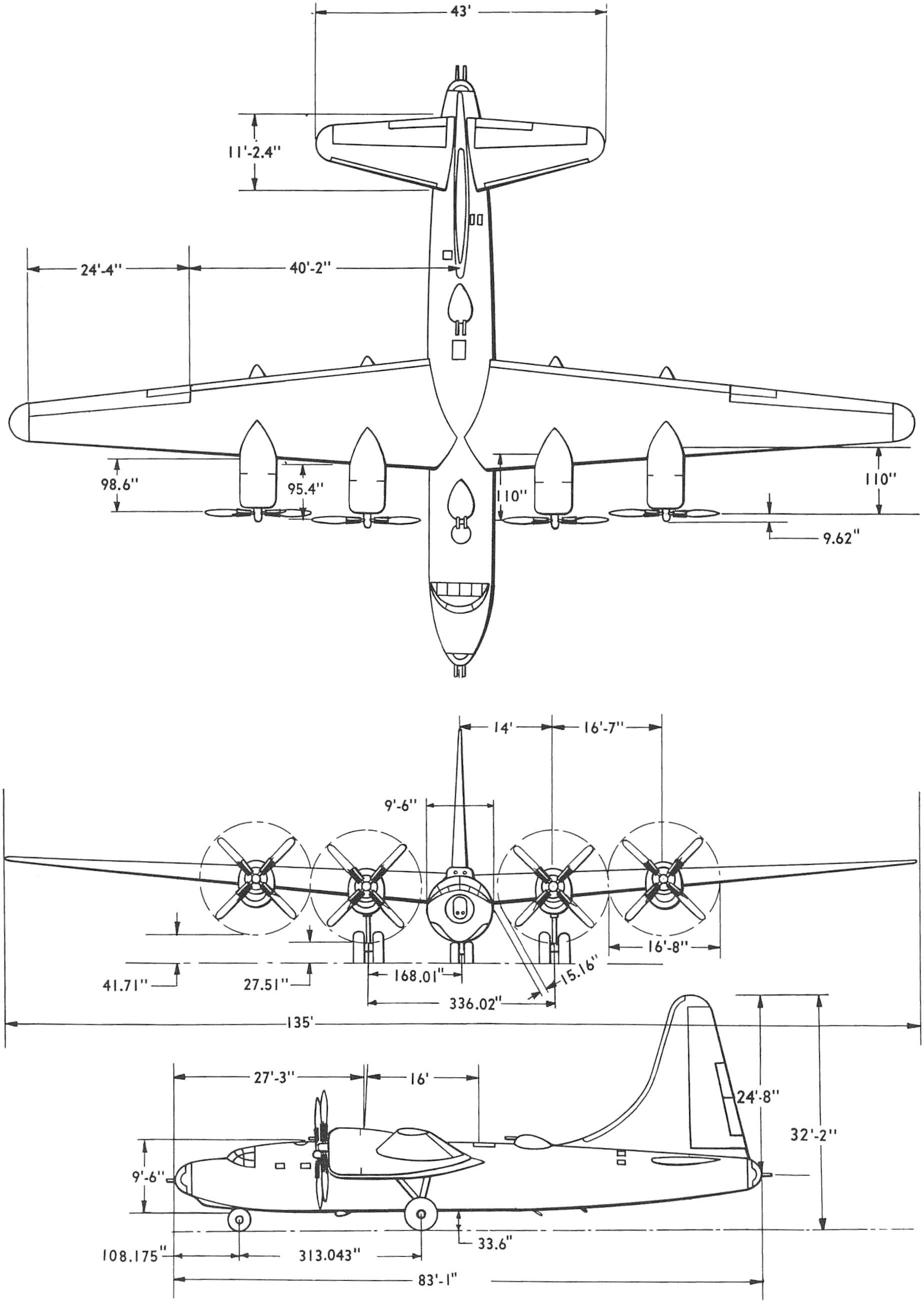
3-view line drawing of the Consolidated B-32 Dominator

Data from General Dynamics Aircraft and their Predecessors

General characteristics

- Crew: 10
- Length: 82 ft 1 in (25.02 m)
- Wingspan: 135 ft 0 in (41.15 m)
- Height: 32 ft 2 in (9.80 m)
- Wing area: 1,422 sq ft (132.1 m^{2})
- Empty weight: 60,278 lb (27,342 kg)
- Gross weight: 100,800 lb (45,722 kg)
- Max takeoff weight: 123,250 lb (55,905 kg)
- Powerplant: 4 × Wright R-3350-23A Duplex-Cyclone 18-cylinder air-cooled radial piston engines, 2,200 hp (1,600 kW) each
- Propellers: 4-bladed constant-speed propellers

Performance

- Maximum speed: 357 mph (575 km/h, 310 kn) at 30,000 ft (9,144 m)
- Cruise speed: 290 mph (470 km/h, 250 kn)
- Range: 3,800 mi (6,100 km, 3,300 nmi)
- Service ceiling: 30,700 ft (9,400 m)
- Rate of climb: 1,050 ft/min (5.3 m/s)

Armament

- Guns: 10 × .50 in (12.7 mm) M2 Browning machine guns
- Bombs: 20,000 lb (9,100 kg)

== See also ==
Related development

- Consolidated B-24 Liberator

Aircraft of comparable role, configuration, and era

- Avro Lincoln
- Boeing B-29 Superfortress
- Douglas XB-31
- Lockheed XB-30
- Martin XB-33 Super Marauder
- Messerschmitt Me 264
- Tupolev Tu-4

Related lists

- List of aircraft of World War II
- List of military aircraft of the United States
- List of bomber aircraft
