= 312th Aeronautical Systems Wing =

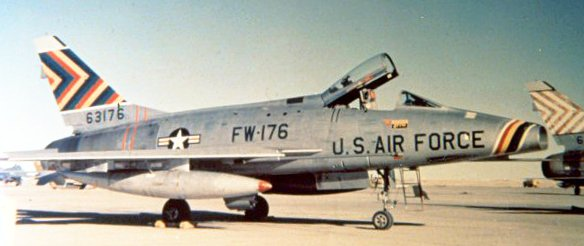
- 474th Tactical Fighter Group Commander's aircraft (Note: Aircraft is North American F-100D-75-NA Super Sabre, serial 56-3176.)
- Active: 1954-1959; 2005-2010
- Country: United States
- Branch: United States Air Force
- Role: Systems development
- Decorations: Air Force Outstanding Unit Award

Commanders
- Notable commanders: Col. Donald Blakeslee

Insignia
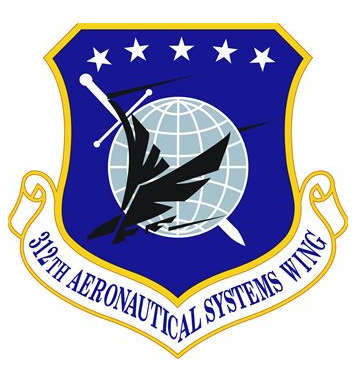
- 312th Aeronautical Systems Wing emblem (Note: Approved 9 March 2009.)

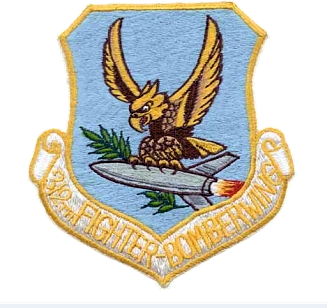
- 312th Tactical Fighter Wing emblem (Note: Approved 30 November 1958.)

The 312th Aeronautical Systems Wing is an inactive United States Air Force unit. It was last active in June 2010 at Wright-Patterson Air Force Base, Ohio, where it managed attack and fighter aircraft systems development as part of the Aeronautical Systems Center.

The wing was first activated in 1954 as the 312th Fighter-Bomber Wing at Clovis Air Force Base, New Mexico. Until 1957, it had one fighter-bomber group assigned to it, and another one attached. From that time until it was inactivated in 1959, it was one of two North American F-100 Super Sabre wings assigned to the 832d Air Division.

== History ==
=== Cold War fighter wing ===
The wing was first activated as the 312th Fighter-Bomber Wing at Clovis Air Force Base, New Mexico in the fall of 1954. A number of wings had been activated at Clovis and trained there since it reopened in 1951. The 312th was assigned to Ninth Air Force upon activation.

The 312th was initially equipped with a hodgepodge of obsolete Republic F-84G Thunderjets and some more modern North American F-86H Sabres. On 8 November 1954, the 474th Fighter-Bomber Group moved to Clovis from Taegu Air Base, South Korea after fighting in the Korean War. The 474th joined 312th Fighter-Bomber Group as a second flying component of the wing. It was to be a training organization. Beginning in September 1955, the wing began training in the use of battlefield tactical nuclear weapons. It began to receive new North American F-100D Super Sabres in December 1956. From April 1956 to October 1957 the wing rotated tactical squadrons to either Châteauroux-Déols Air Base or Étain-Rouvres Air Base in France, for six-month deployments to United States Air Forces Europe.

In June 1957 Clovis Air Force Base was renamed Cannon Air Force Base. In October 1957, as part of a realignment of Tactical Air Command (TAC)'s numbered air forces on a geographical, rather than a functional basis, the 312th was transferred to Eighteenth Air Force. Subsequently, it was placed under the 832d Air Division. The 312th furnished units for composite air strike forces in the Far East during 1957 and 1958, deploying F-100s and crews to Taiwan during the 1958 Taiwan Strait Crisis. Wing F-100s also deployed to Turkey during the 1958 Lebanon crisis.

HQ USAF redesignated the 312th as a Tactical Fighter Wing on 1 July 1958 as part of an Air Force-wide redesignation of Fighter-Bomber and Fighter-Day units. In February 1959 as Bergstrom Air Force Base, Texas was transferred to Strategic Air Command, TAC moved the 27th Tactical Fighter Wing on paper to Cannon, where it assumed the 312th's mission, personnel and aircraft. The 312th TFW was inactivated.

=== Attack and fighter systems development ===
In 2004, Air Force Materiel Command began to reorganize its traditional directorates into wings and groups, activating the Fighter Attack Systems Wing at Wright-Patterson Air Force Base, Ohio. The following year, it consolidated this new wing with the 312th, designating it the 312th Aeronautical Systems Wing. In 2010, Materiel Command returned to its traditional organization and the wing was inactivated.

== Lineage ==
312th Tactical Fighter Wing

- Established as the 312th Fighter-Bomber Wing on 23 March 1953

Activated on 1 October 1954
Redesignated 312th Tactical Fighter Wing on 1 July 1958
Inactivated on 18 February 1959

- Consolidated with the 312th Aeronautical Systems Wing as 312th Aeronautical Systems Wing on 23 June 2006

312th Aeronautical Systems Wing

- Established as the Fighter Attack Systems Wing on 23 November 2004

Activated on 18 January 2005

- Redesignated 312th Aeronautical Systems Wing on 14 June 2006
- Consolidated with the 312th Tactical Fighter Wing on 23 June 2006

Inactivated on 30 June 2010

=== Assignments ===
- Ninth Air Force, 1 October 1954
- Eighteenth Air Force, 1 October 1957
- 832d Air Division, 8 October 1957 – 18 February 1959
- Aeronautical Systems Center, 18 January 2005 – 30 June 2010

=== Components ===
Groups

- 312th Fighter-Bomber Group (later F-16 Systems Group, 312th Aeronautical Systems Group): 1 October 1954 – 8 October 1957, 18 January 2005 – 30 June 2010
- 474th Fighter-Bomber Group: attached 22 December 1954 – 8 October 1957
- 702d Aeronautical Systems Group: 30 June 2008/2009 - 30 June 2010
- F-15 Systems Group (later 912th Aeronautical Systems Group): 18 January 2005 – 30 June 2010

Squadrons

- 386th Fighter-Bomber Squadron (later 386th Tactical Fighter Squadron): 8 October 1957 – 18 February 1959 (detached 12 November – 6 December 1957)
- 387th Fighter-Bomber Squadron (later 387th Tactical Fighter Squadron): 8 October 1957 – 18 February 1959
- 388th Fighter-Bomber Squadron (later 388th Tactical Fighter Squadron): 8 October 1957 – 18 February 1959 (detached 4 September – 3 December 1958)
- 477th Fighter-Bomber Squadron (later 477th Tactical Fighter Squadron): 8 October 1957 – 18 February 1959 (detached 8 September - ll December 1958)
- 640th Aeronautical Systems Squadron: 14 July 2006 – 30 June 2010
- Combat Systems Squadron (later 641st Aeronautical Systems Squadron): 18 January 2005 – 30 June 2010
- 650th Aeronautical Systems Squadron; 1 June 2008 – 30 June 2010
- 651st Aeronautical Systems Squadron; 1 June 2008 – 30 June 2010

=== Stations ===
- Clovis Air Force Base (later Cannon Air Force Base], New Mexico, 1 October 1954 – 18 February 1959
- Wright-Patterson Air Force Base, Ohio, 18 January 2005 – 30 June 2010

=== Aircraft ===
- Republic F-84G Thunderjet, 1954
- North American F-86H Sabre, 1954-1957
- North American F-100 Super Sabre, 1956-1959
