= Crotyl alcohol =

- Crotyl alcohol

Names
- Preferred IUPAC name (2E)-But-2-en-1-ol
- Other names (E)-But-2-en-1-ol; Crotyl alcohol Crotonyl alcohol 2-Butenol

Identifiers
CAS Number	6117-91-5
3D model (JSmol)	Interactive image
ChEBI	CHEBI:62891
ChEMBL	ChEMBL118459
ChemSpider	13871721
ECHA InfoCard	100.025.533
EC Number	207-996-8
PubChem CID	637922
UNII	D7F26UNN0B
UN number	2614
CompTox Dashboard (EPA)	DTXSID2052283
- InChI: InChI=1S/C4H8O/c1-2-3-4-5/h2-3,5H,4H2,1H3/b3-2+ Key: WCASXYBKJHWFMY-NSCUHMNNSA-N; InChI=1/C4H8O/c1-2-3-4-5/h2-3,5H,4H2,1H3/b3-2+ Key: WCASXYBKJHWFMY-NSCUHMNNBR
- SMILES: C\C=C\CO

Properties
Chemical formula	C_{4}H_{8}O
Molar mass	72.10 g/mol
Density	0.8454 g/cm^{3}
Melting point	< 25 °C (77 °F; 298 K)
Boiling point	121.2 °C (250.2 °F; 394.3 K)

Hazards
- GHS labelling
Pictograms	(GHS02: Flammable) (GHS07: Exclamation mark)
Signal word	Warning
Hazard statements	H226, H302, H312, H315, H319
Precautionary statements	P210, P233, P240, P241, P242, P243, P264, P270, P280, P301+P312, P302+P352, P303+P361+P353, P305+P351+P338, P312, P321, P322, P330, P332+P313, P337+P313, P362, P363, P370+P378, P403+P235, P501
- Except where otherwise noted, data are given for materials in their standard state (at 25 °C [77 °F], 100 kPa). verify (what is ?) Infobox references

Crotyl alcohol, or crotonyl alcohol, is an unsaturated alcohol. It is a colourless liquid that is moderately soluble in water and miscible with most organic solvents. It exhibits cis-trans isomerism about the alkene group, and is a structural isomer of butanone.

It can be synthesized by the hydrogenation of crotonaldehyde. The compound is of little commercial interest, but can be used as a reagent in laboratory organic synthesis.

== See also ==
- Crotyl
- Allyl alcohol
- Crotonaldehyde
- Crotonic acid
