= Salinas Municipal Airport =

Municipal airport in Salinas, California, United States

Salinas Municipal Airport Salinas Army Air Base
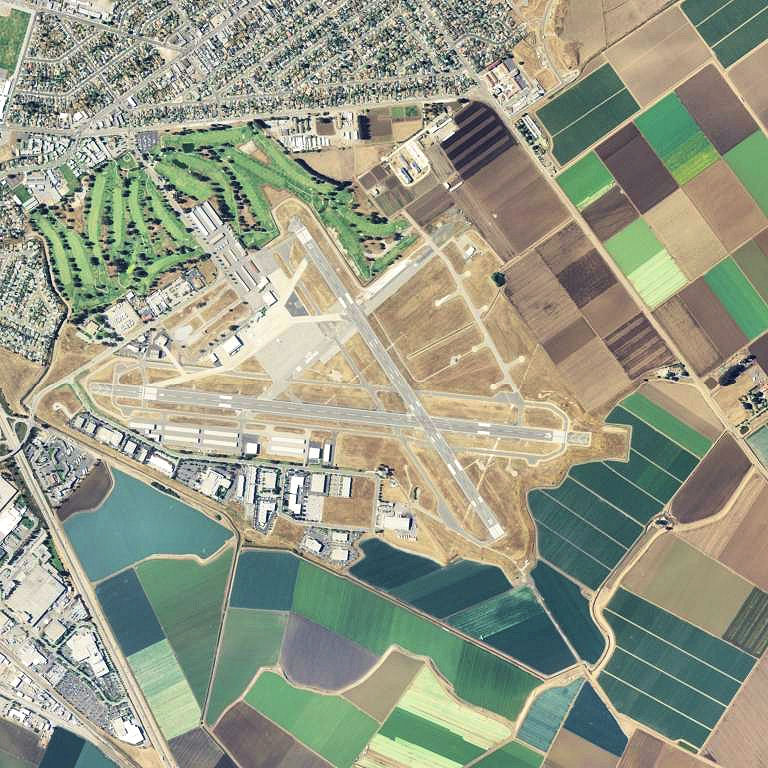
- USGS 2006 orthophoto
- IATA: SNS; ICAO: KSNS; FAA LID: SNS; WMO: 72593

Summary
- Airport type: Public
- Owner: City of Salinas
- Serves: Salinas, California
- Location: Salinas, CA
- Built: 1941
- Elevation AMSL: 84 ft (26 m)
- Coordinates: 36°39′46″N 121°36′23″W

Map
- Location of the Airport

Runways
Direction	Length		Surface
Direction	ft	m	Surface
8/26	6,004	1,830	Asphalt
13/31	4,825	1,471	Asphalt

Helipads
Number	Length		Surface
Number	ft	m	Surface
H1	90	27	Asphalt/concrete

Statistics (2023)
- Aircraft operations: 70,110
- Based aircraft: 153
- Source: Federal Aviation Administration

Salinas Municipal Airport (IATA: SNS, ICAO: KSNS, FAA LID: SNS), commonly referred to as Salinas Airport, is an airport in Monterey County, California, United States, three miles (4.8 km) southeast of Downtown Salinas. It is included in the 2017–21 National Plan of Integrated Airport Systems as a regional general aviation airport. It had 1,800 enplanements in 2014.

== Facilities ==
Salinas Municipal Airport covers 605 acres (245 ha) and has two asphalt runways: 8/26 is 6,004 x 150 ft. (1,830 x 46 m), and 13/31 is 4,825 x 150 ft. (1,471 x 46 m). It has one helipad, 90 x 90 ft. (27 x 27 m) asphalt/concrete.

In the year ending June 30, 2007 the airport had 77,896 aircraft operations, average 213 per day: 97% general aviation, 2% air taxi and 1% military. 229 aircraft were then based at this airport: 70% single-engine, 21% multi-engine, 3% jet and 6% helicopter.

== History ==
A first airport was proposed by members of the local American Legion post. With city support, it was established in the summer of 1928 and was called Salinas American Legion Airport, later known simply as Legion Field. It was located near the current American Legion Post #31 and the runway ran parallel to West Laurel Drive. Commercial service was available as early as 1933 via Pacific Seaboard Air Lines on twice-daily flights between San Francisco and Los Angeles. Legion Field closed shortly after the current airfield was turned over to civilian control following the end of the Second World War.

The current airfield opened in late 1941 as Salinas Army Air Field (AAF). It was used by the United States Army Air Forces Fourth Air Force as a subpost to Fort Ord during the war. Its mission was that of an incoming personnel processing center and a training field for Army pilots in reconnaissance and observation duties in various aircraft from light observation planes to medium bombers. The Air Transport Command also used the field and had an air freight terminal here for transshipment of cargo.

=== Reconnaissance units ===
Initially, IV Air Support Command used Salinas as a training base for photo-reconnaissance units. The 69th Observation Group arrived at the base in October 1941 equipped with a variety of O-38, O-46, O-47 and O-52 light aircraft which were also used in conjunction with Army ground forces at Fort Ord in their maneuvers. The 69th moved to San Bernardino AAF in Southern California after the Pearl Harbor Attack in December and engaged in anti-submarine patrols.

The 71st Observation Group replaced the 69th in December 1941, moving in from Third Air Force at Birmingham Airport, Alabama. The 71st was equipped with a similar mixture of observation aircraft and engaged in anti-submarine patrols over the Central California coast until August. The group was temporarily assigned to the Army Desert Training Center at Rice AAF in the Mojave Desert in August, training with General George Patton's forces prior to the Operation Torch invasion of North Africa in November. It moved back to Salinas in October 1942, and trained with Fort Ord units. It was reassigned back to Third Air Force, moving to Esler Field, Louisiana in January 1943 where it served as the observation unit for Army forces training at Fort Polk.

The last observation group at Salinas was the 70th Observation Group, being moved from Second Air Force in Washington. It continued the anti-submarine and support observation mission at Fort Ord until August, when it was reassigned back to Second Air Force at Redmond AAF, Oregon.

=== P-38 Lightning training ===
In September, the field was transferred to IV Fighter Command, which assigned the 360th Fighter Group as a P-38 Lightning Replacement Training Unit (RTU). The 360th trained replacement pilots on the Lightning with the 371st, 372d, 373d and 446th Fighter Squadrons as its operational squadrons.

=== P-61 Black Widow training ===
The move of the Army Air Forces Night Fighter School to Hammer Field, California dictated the move of the 360th Fighter Group to Santa Maria AAF in January 1944. Its designation was also changed from an Army Airfield to Salinas Army Air Base. Salinas was used as an auxiliary airfield by the 481st Night Fighter Operational Training Group (NFOTG) at Hammer Field, and moved a combination of modified Douglas A-20 Havocs for night fighter operations, designated P-70, and brand-new prototype YP-61 Black Widow purpose-built night fighters.

The 548th Night Fighter Squadron was formed at Salinas in April 1944. Like all of the Night Fighter squadrons being trained by IV Fighter Command, it moved among several bases in the San Joaquin Valley. Flights of P-61s from the 426th, 427th, 547th, 549th and 550th Night Fighter Squadrons moved in and out of Salinas AAF during 1944 as part of their training prior to being deployed to combat units, primarily in the Pacific and CBI theaters.

In December 1944 the 481st NFOTG was inactivated as part of an AAF reorganization. It was essentially re-designated as the 451st Army Air Forces Base Unit, and instead of training squadrons, it became a Replacement Pilot Training (RTU) organization which sent pilots overseas to established Night Fighter Squadrons. The 451st was made up of a number of lettered squadrons, which were expressed as the 451st AAFBU (A Squadron), and so on. These replacement training squadrons operated at the same airfields as was used by the 481st NFOG in the San Joaquin Valley. The 451st was under the operational control of the IV Fighter Command 319th Wing, headquartered at Hammer Field.

The 451st AAFBU concluded its training of replacement pilots in May 1945 and operations at the airfield were phased down to a standby status. With the end of the war, the base was declared excess to requirements and returned to civil control.

=== Commercial service ===
Salinas Municipal Airport has been without commercial service since 1981, when a commuter airline named Air Trails was offering services to San Francisco and to Oakland. United Airlines, on the other hand, ended its daily Convair service in 1962. As late as 1961, United was offering once-daily stops both northbound and southbound between San Francisco and Los Angeles with intermittent stops in Monterey and Santa Barbara.

== California International Airshow ==
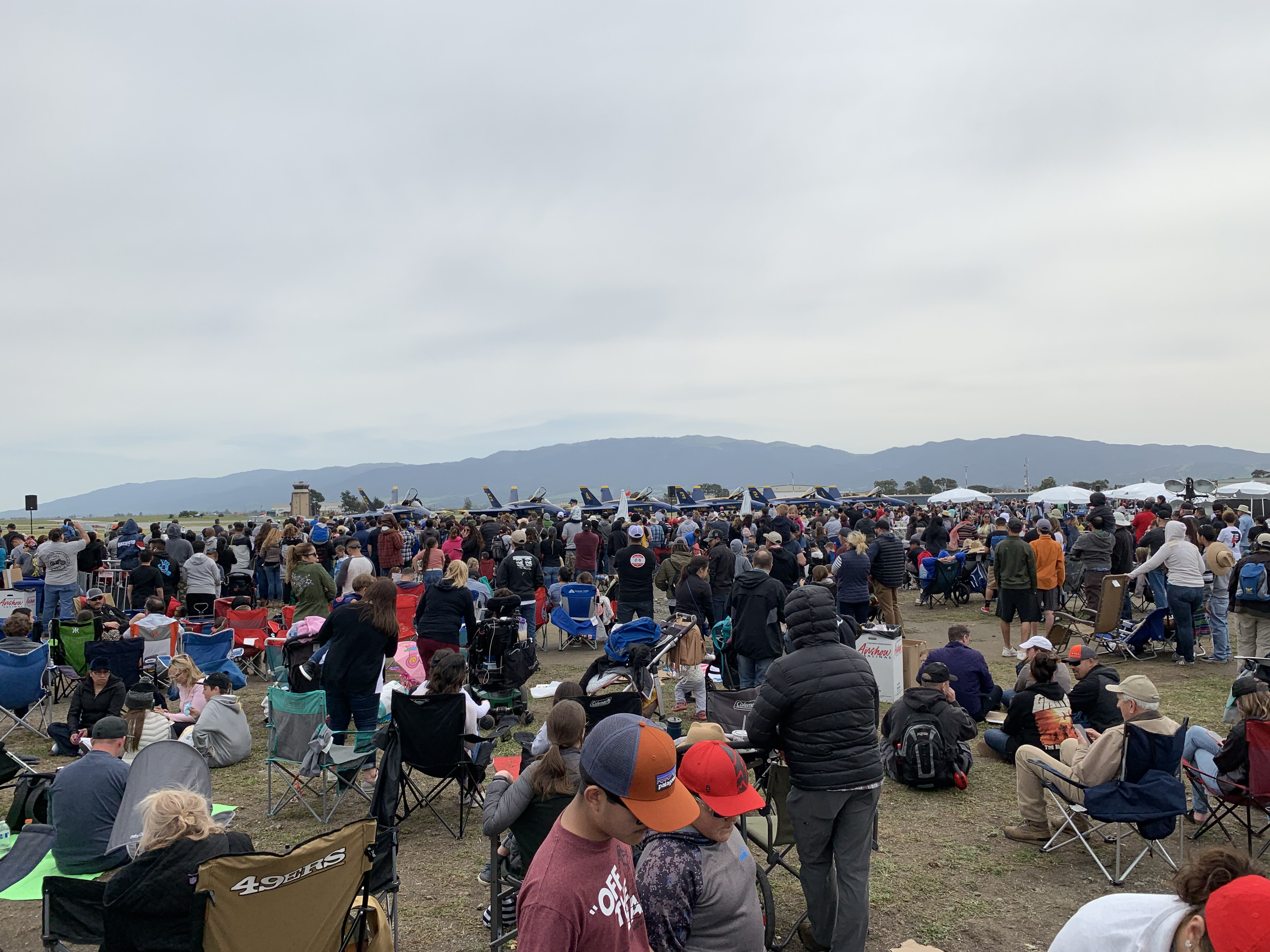
Blue Angel F-18 Super Hornets minutes before taking flight at the 2019, California Int'l Airshow.

Salinas Airport is the location of the annual California International Airshow, set at various times during the year. The air show often features top-tier aerobatic teams such as the Canadian Forces Snowbirds, U.S. Air Force Thunderbirds and the U.S. Navy Blue Angels, with the proceeds going to local charities.

== Future plans ==
There are future plans to expand the runways to at least 7,000 feet (2,100 m) to accommodate commercial aircraft. It will not be meant to compete with Monterey Regional Airport (MRY) but will be a viable backup option if fog delays landings and takeoffs in Monterey. While it’s not clear which airlines would use this airport over the alternatives Fresno, Bakersfield, or San Jose, a plane flying to Salinas would be more convenient for people getting to Monterey since it is fewer than 20 miles (32 km) away.

== See also ==
- California World War II Army Airfields

== Other sources ==
- This article incorporates public domain material from the Air Force Historical Research Agency
- Maurer, Maurer (1983). Air Force Combat Units Of World War II. Maxwell AFB, Alabama: Office of Air Force History. ISBN 0-89201-092-4.
- Maurer, Maurer, ed. (1982) [1969]. Combat Squadrons of the Air Force, World War II (PDF) (reprint ed.). Washington, DC: Office of Air Force History. ISBN 0-405-12194-6. LCCN 70605402. OCLC 72556. Archived from the original (PDF) on December 20, 2016.5
- Shaw, Frederick J. (2004), Locating Air Force Base Sites History's Legacy, Air Force History and Museums Program, United States Air Force, Washington DC, 2004.
