= 481st =

481st may refer to:

- 481st Bombardment Squadron, inactive United States Air Force unit
- 481st Tactical Fighter Squadron, fighter squadron of the United States Air Force

== See also ==
- 481 (number)
- 481, the year 481 (CDLXXXI) of the Julian calendar
- 481 BC
