= 481st Tactical Fighter Squadron =

481st Tactical Fighter Squadron (later 481st Tactical Fighter Training Squadron)
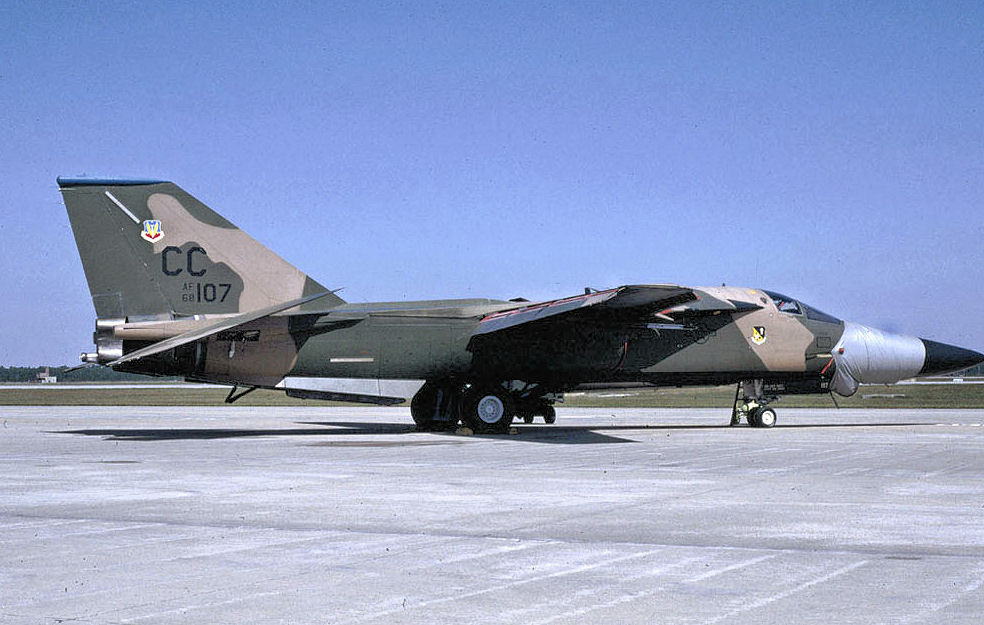
- 27th Wing F-111 Aardvark (Note: Aircraft is General Dynamics F-111D Aardvark, serial 68-107, taken in 1979. This plane remained at Cannon until being sent to the Aerospace Maintenance and Regeneration Center (AMARC) on 19 November 1992. it was scrapped on 6 June 2011. Baugher, Joe (4 September 2023). "1968 USAF Serial Numbers". Joe Baugher.)
- Active: 1942–1944; 1957–1973; 1976–1980
- Country: United States
- Branch: United States Air Force
- Role: Fighter training
- Nicknames: Crusaders and Green Knights
- Engagements: Vietnam War
- Decorations: Air Force Outstanding Unit Award

Commanders
- Notable commanders: Col Harold E. Comstock

Insignia
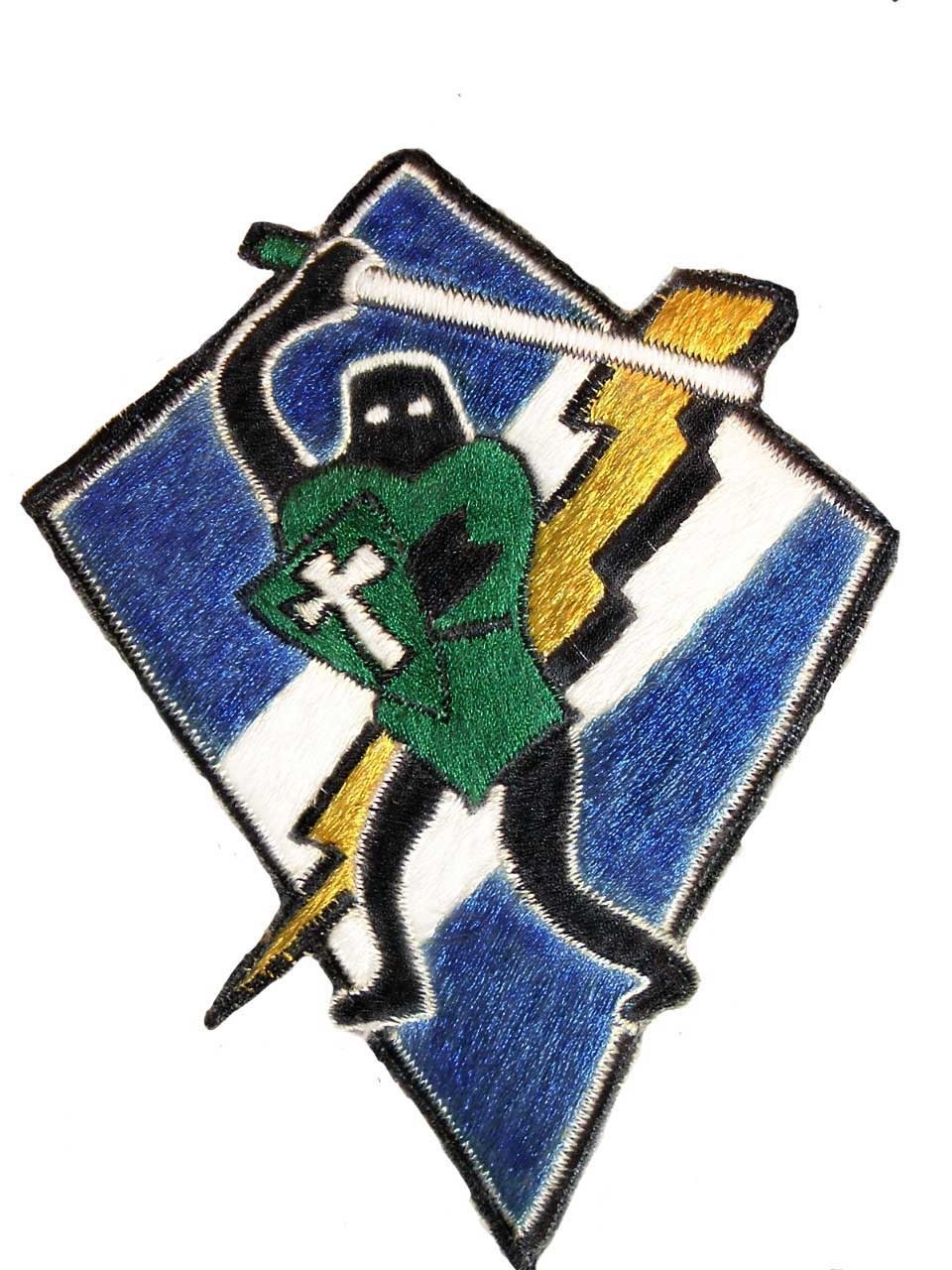
- 481st Tactical Fighter Squadron emblem
- Tail marking during 1965 deployment to Viet Nam (Note: This allowed forward air controllers to easily identify the F-100s they were controlling as being part of the 481st. Many of the planes were also given personal names and pictures painted on.): Green triangle
- Tail marking post 1968: CA

The 481st Tactical Fighter Training Squadron is an inactive United States Air Force fighter squadron. Its last assignment was with the 27th Tactical Fighter Wing at Cannon Air Force Base, New Mexico, where it was inactivated on 8 July 1980.

The first predecessor of the squadron was the 481st Bombardment Squadron, which served as a Replacement Training Unit for Martin B-26 Marauder crews during World War II, until it was disbanded in 1944, when the Army Air Forces reorganized its training units.

The second predecessor of the squadron was organized at Bergstrom Air Force Base, Texas in 1957 as the 481st Fighter-Bomber Squadron, when the 27th Fighter-Bomber Wing expanded from three to four squadrons. It moved to Cannon Air Force Base later that year, absorbing the personnel and equipment of another squadron. It trained in tactical fighter operations and participated in deployments, including a deployment to Viet Nam in 1965. After returning, it acted as a replacement training unit until inactivating in 1973.

The squadron was active again from 1976 to 1980 as the 481st Tactical Fighter Training Squadron.

== History ==
=== World War II ===
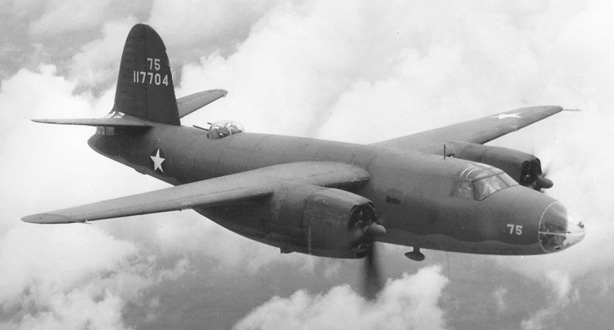
B-26 Marauder as flown by the squadron

The first predecessor of the squadron was activated as the 481st Bombardment Squadron at MacDill Field, Florida in July 1942 as one of the four original squadrons of the 336th Bombardment Group. It served as a Replacement Training Unit (RTU) for Martin B-26 Marauder crews. RTUs were oversized units that trained individual pilots and aircrews. The squadron relocated to several bases in Florida before settling at Lake Charles Army Air Field, Louisiana in November 1943.

However, standard military units like the 481st, based on relatively inflexible tables of organization were not proving well adapted to the training mission. Accordingly, the Army Air Forces adopted a more functional system for its training units in which each base was organized into a separate numbered unit. The 481st and other training and support organizations at Lake Charles were disbanded and replaced by the 332d AAF Base Unit (Replacement Training Unit, Medium Bombardment). The squadron was replaced by Section U of the new base unit. Just before disbanding, the 336th Group began to receive Douglas A-26 Invaders to replace its Marauders

=== Tactical fighter unit ===
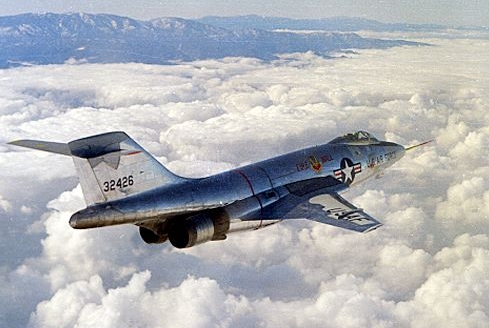
F-101 in which Maj Drew set a world speed record (Note: Aircraft is McDonnelll F-101A-5-MC Voodoo. It was modified with more powerful engines as JF-101A. The flight won the Thompson Trophy for 1957. The plane was transferred to storage at AMARC in February 1961 and is preserved at Cannon AFB. Baugher, Joe (5 August 2023). "1953 USAF Serial Numbers". Joe Baugher.)

In the summer of 1957, Strategic Air Command (SAC) transferred its fighter units, including the 27th Strategic Fighter Wing at Bergstrom Air Force Base, to Tactical Air Command (TAC), which renamed the wing the 27th Fighter-Bomber Wing. The wing was just beginning to convert from the Republic F-84F Thunderstreak to the McDonnell F-101 Voodoo. During this conversion, the wing added a fourth squadron, the 481st Fighter-Bomber Squadron, which was the second predecessor of the squadron. Although activated on 15 September, the squadron did not begin to become operational until about 17 December 1957.

On 12 December 1957, the new squadron's first commander and wing F-101 project officer, Major Adrian E. Drew, flew a Voodoo to set a world speed record of 1,207.6 mph and 1,212.8 mph in the opposite direction over a closed course in the Mojave Desert. The squadron received personnel and F-101 aircraft early in 1958 and by mid-year, the 481st was combat ready. In January 1959 the redesignated 481st Tactical Fighter Squadron and become non-operational when the 27th Wing sent its F-101s to the United Kingdom.

After the 27th Wing transferred its F-101 aircraft, the wing and its squadrons moved on paper to Cannon Air Force Base, New Mexico, in February 1959. At Cannon, the wing absorbed the personnel and equipment of the 312th Tactical Fighter Wing, which was simultaneously inactivated. In this move, the squadron received the personnel and North American F-100 Super Sabres of the 477th Tactical Fighter Squadron. In May 1964 it participated in Exercise Desert Strike, a joint Air Force and Army training exercise in California, Nevada and Arizona that lasted two weeks and involved nearly 100,000 personnel, fifteen active Air Force fighter squadrons, and numerous other flying squadrons and support units from the active military, the Air National Guard and the Air Force Reserve.

The 481st was selected as the outstanding fighter unit in TAC for two consecutive quarters in 1964. In June 1965, the squadron was the first to respond and depart during a full scale no-notice Operational Readiness Inspection conducted by a TAC inspection team.

==== Deployments ====
Within five months of receiving their first F-100 aircraft, the 481st deployed to Hahn Air Base, Germany, to engage in daytime air defense operations. During this rotation, the squadron set a TAC record for deploying and redeploying without an abort or incident. During a deployment in April 1961, the 481st sent a flight of four F-100s non-stop from Nellis Air Force Base, Nevada, to RAF Lakenheath, England. The aircraft returned to England Air Force Base, Louisiana, in time for the entire squadron to deploy to RAF Wethersfield, England, on 9 May 1961. On 12 June 1961, the squadron moved to Incirlik Air Base, Turkey, to fulfill its first NATO commitment. At Incirlik, the Squadron assumed an alert posture and remained until October of that year.

Early during the Cuban Missile Crisis, SAC withdrew its bomber and tanker forces from its three bases in Florida to make room for tactical and air defense forces. By 21 October only SAC alert aircraft remained, and its alert planes left the next day. This made room for the squadron, along with its parent wing and two sister squadrons to forward deploy to MacDill Air Force Base, Florida. There it maintained a constant alert posture. With the end of the crisis, SAC aircraft began returning to MacDill on 28 November, and the squadron returned to Cannon in early December.

Between 1963 and 1973, aircraft and personnel from the frequently 481st deployed to various parts of the world. It deployed to Dhahran Air Base, Saudi Arabia for Operation Hard Surface. This operation started with another unit on 4 May 1963. The 481st participated in this operation from 14 November 1963 to 1 February 1964. The units assigned to this operation were awarded the Air Force Outstanding Unit Award. In March, the 481st and the 429th Tactical Fighter Squadrons deployed to Vahdati Air Base at Dezful Iran, with 36 aircraft and over 500 personnel for Exercise Delawar, a Baghdad Pact-sponsored joint training exercise with the Imperial Iranian Air Force. Later, in September 1964, the squadron was sent on a 120-day rotational deployment to Misawa Air Base, Japan. During this time, some aircraft of the 481st also went to Kung Kuan Air Base, Taiwan. While in Taiwan, the aircraft took part in Operation Sky Soldier VI.

==== Vietnam War ====
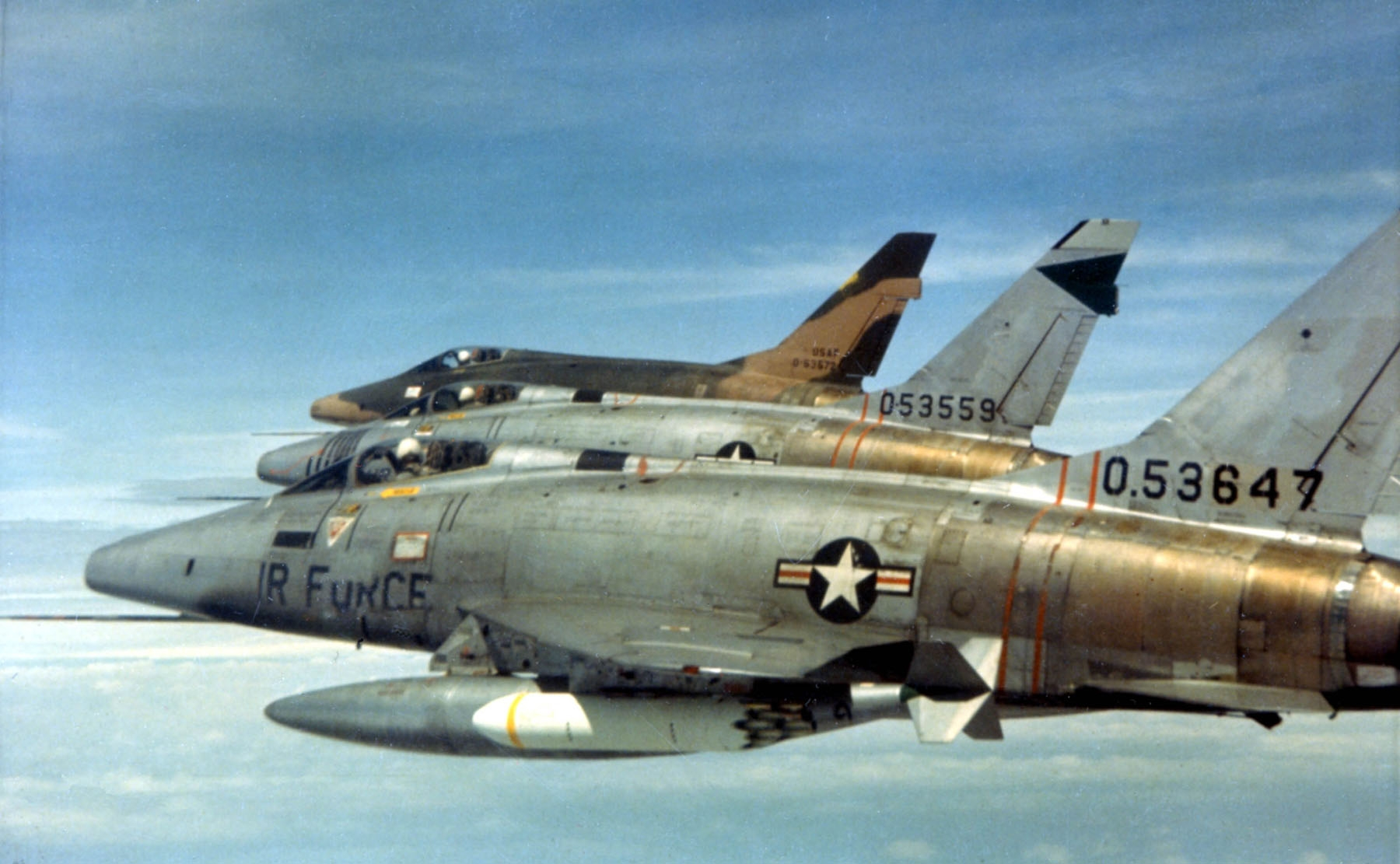
Squadron F-100s deployed to Vietnam (Note: Aircraft are North American F-100D-25-NA Super Sabre, serial 55-3647 (shot down over Laos on 20 December 1968. The pilot ejected and was rescued.) and F-100D-20-NA Super Sabre, serial 55-3559 (shot down over South Vietnam on 14 October 1966. The pilot ejected, but his parachute failed to deploy) over South Vietnam in February 1966. Baugher, Joe (27 July 2023). "1955 USAF Serial Numbers". Joe Baugher. The early F-100s to arrive in Southeast Asia were unpainted when they arrived like the foreground aircraft, but all eventually received camouflage paint like the aircraft in the back.)

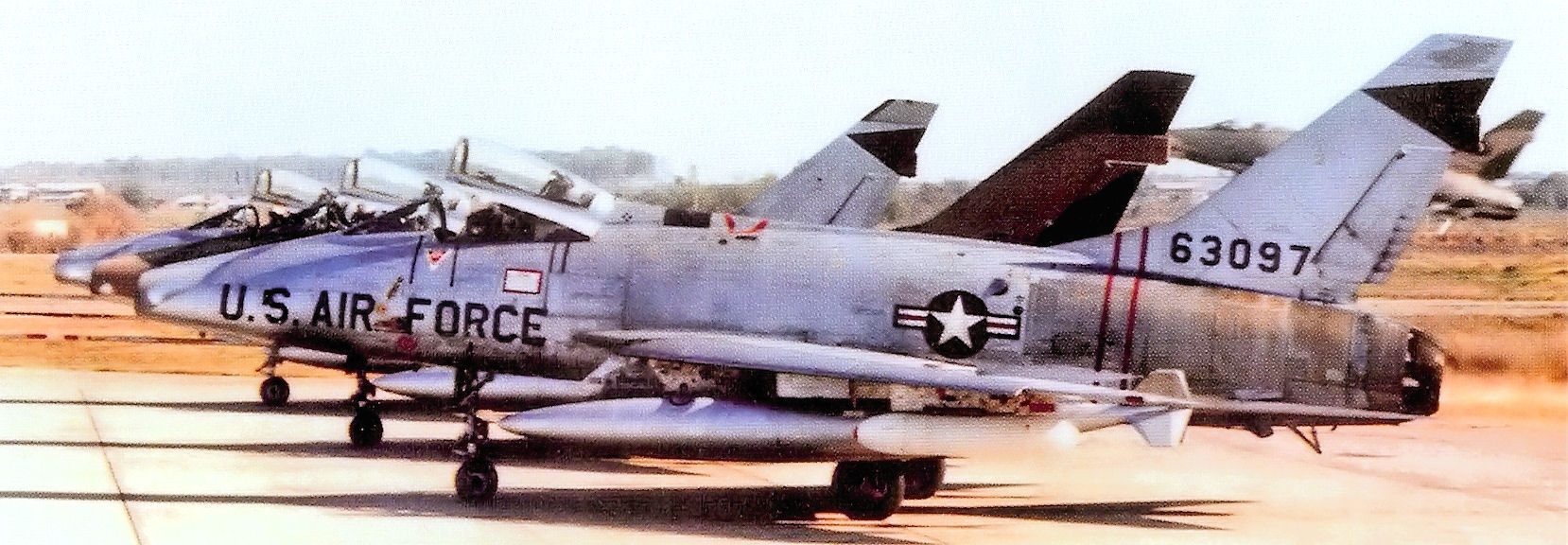
481st F-100s flying from Tan Son Nhut Airport in 1965. (Note: North American F-100F-10-NA Super Sabre, serial 56-3907 in foreground. This aircraft survived the war and was sent to MASDC on 7 November 1979. It was converted to a QF-100F target drone and destroyed on 12 July 1990 Baugher, Joe (11 May 2023). "1956 USAF Serial Numbers". Joe Baugher.)

The squadron made its first deployment to Southeast Asia on 10 November 1963 to Takhli Royal Thai Air Force Base, Thailand, where it spent 75 Days. In the Spring of 1965, the squadron was notified it would deploy to Vietnam in late June for a combat tour. On 11 June 1965, without prior warning, the squadron was alerted to deploy within twenty-four hours and left Cannon on 12 June 1965 under the code name Operation Two Buck 16. After a one-week delay at Clark Air Base in the Philippines, the squadron arrived at Tan Son Nhut Airport on 21 June 1965 and began flying combat missions on that first day in South Vietnam.

On the night of 19 July, the Army special forces camp at Bu Dop, about 100 miles north of Saigon, came under attack by the Viet Cong. Air strikes by the 481st were credited with "probably saving the camp that night". (Note: Capt Norm Turner and 1/Lt Donald Watson were awarded the Distinguished Flying Cross for their actions. Lt Watson and Lt John Hauschildt were lost to enemy action during this deployment. Lt Watson was one of four friends who graduated from the Air Force Academy and were assigned to Cannon AFB. The four pooled their money to buy a house. In the space of ten weeks, three of the four were killed; the two mentioned and Lt Ralph Ford. "Ex-CAFB Pilot Makes Sad Journey 'Home'". The Clovis News Journal. 20 October 1965.) The squadron averaged over 30 sorties a days and by 6 September 1965, the Crusaders had completed 2,000 hours of combat flying.

The squadron was programmed to return to Cannon in August, following the three-month cycle usual for fighter squadrons temporarily deployed to Vietnam up to this time. However, the Air Force was planning to deploy fighter units to Vietnam on a permanent basis, and needed time to prepare them. The squadron's deployment was extended through late November, when the first permanent squadrons began to arrive in Vietnam.

In November, the squadron flew many sorties in support of the defenders during the siege of Plei Me and airstrikes by the 481st and other fighter units were "given much of the credit for turning the battle of Plei Me from disaster into victory." When the North Vietnamese left Plei Me and Pleiku, they moved west and the 481st again supported ground troops in the Battle of Ia Drang Valley. By 27 November 1965, the 481st headed back to Cannon and had flown more than 3,600 combat sorties and established a 98% aircraft in commission rate. During this deployment to Vietnam, the 481st accumulated 5,025 hours of combat flight-time. The squadron left its F-100s behind for reassignment to the arriving permanent squadrons.

==== Replacement training ====
Shortly after returning to Cannon, the 481st became a replacement training unit charged with training F-100 pilots for worldwide assignments. The mission of the squadron did not change until 5 September 1968 when the 27th Wing began preparing for the receipt of General Dynamics F-111 Aardvark aircraft and a return to tactical operationswhen the squadron transferred its aircraft and became not operational.

=== F-111 era ===
Although 1 July 1969 saw the 481st manned again, it did not receive its first F-111E until 30 September 1969. By the close of 1969, the squadron had 24 F-111E aircraft assigned and was training toward becoming operationally ready when the F-111 fleet was grounded on 28 December 1969, due to the failure of the wing of an F-111 at Nellis Air Force Base. During the ensuing down time, the 481st utilized a few F-100s of the 524th Tactical Fighter Squadron as well as Lockheed AT-33s of the 27th Combat Support Group to maintain proficiency. The 481st pilots also supported the 2nd Aircraft Delivery Group by ferrying F-100s from Europe to the U.S. and from the U.S. to Southeast Asia.

Beginning 10 May 1971, the 481st began ferrying its F-111s to the 20th Tactical Fighter Wing at RAF Upper Heyford, England. The last aircraft left Cannon on 27 July 1971 and two days later the 4427th Tactical Training Squadron absorbed the remaining personnel and resources of the squadron. The 481st was again nonoperational from 31 July 1971 until 12 November 1972 when several 524th Squadron aircrews were transferred. Squadron crews underwent extensive training at Nellis and Cannon, and flew its first F-111D mission on 2 March 1973. The 481st was again inactivated on 31 August 1973 with the 523rd Tactical Fighter Squadron absorbing it resources.

The squadron was reactivated on 15 January 1976 as the 481st Tactical Fighter Training Squadron. From that time until its inactivation on 1 January 1980, the 481st was the primary training squadron for F-111D aircrews. The 481st Bombardment Squadron was reconstituted on 19 September 1985 and consolidated with the 481st Tactical Fighter Training Squadron, which remained in inactive status.

== Lineage ==
481st Bombardment Squadron

- Constituted as the 481st Bombardment Squadron on 9 July 1942

Activated on 15 July 1942
Disbanded on 1 May 1944
Reconstituted on 19 September 1985 and consolidated with the 481st Tactical Fighter Training Squadron as the 481st Tactical Fighter Training Squadron

481st Tactical Fighter Training Squadron

- Constituted as the 481st Fighter-Bomber Squadron on 30 August 1957

Activated on 25 September 1957
Redesignated 481st Tactical Fighter Squadron on 1 July 1958
Inactivated on 31 August 1973

- Redesignated 481st Tactical Fighter Training Squadron on 18 December 1975

Activated on 15 January 1976
Inactivated on 8 July 1980
Consolidated with the 481st Bombardment Squadron on 19 September 1985

=== Assignments ===
- 336th Bombardment Group, 15 July 1942 – 1 May 1944
- 27th Fighter-Bomber Wing (later 27th Tactical Fighter Wing), 25 September 1957 – 31 August 1973 (detached 24 April–20 May 1963, 19 November 1963–1 February 1964, 9 April–c. 20 April 1964, 2 September–4 December 1964) (attached to Seventeenth Air Force 1–25 June 1959; 20th Tactical Fighter Wing 9–12 June 1961, 7216th Combat Support Group –11 October 1961; 33d Tactical Group, 15 June 1965, 6250th Combat Support Group, 8 July – 30 November 1965)
- 27th Tactical Fighter Wing, 15 January 1976 – 8 July 1980

=== Stations ===
- MacDill Field, Florida, 15 July 1942
- Fort Myers Army Air Field, Florida, 10 August 1942
- Avon Park Army Air Field, Florida, 10 December 1942
- Lake Charles Army Air Field, Louisiana, 8 November 1943 – 1 May 1944
- Bergstrom Air Force Base, Texas, 25 September 1957
- Cannon Air Force Base, New Mexico, 18 February 1959 – 31 August 1973
- Cannon Air Force Base, New Mexico, 15 January 1976 – 8 July 1980

=== Aircraft ===
- Martin B-26 Marauder
- McDonnell F-101 Voodoo, 1958
- North American F-100D/F Super Sabre, 1958-1973
- General Dynamics F-111D Aardvark, 1976-1980

=== Awards and campaigns ===
Award streamer	Award	Dates	Notes
	Air Force Outstanding Unit Award	1 September 1960 – 1 November 1961	481st Tactical Fighter Squadron
	Air Force Outstanding Unit Award	1 July 1963 – 31 December 1964	481st Tactical Fighter Squadron

Campaign Streamer	Campaign	Dates	Notes
	Vietnam Defensive	16 June 1965 – 18 November 1965	481st Tactical Fighter Squadron

== See also ==
- List of United States Air Force fighter squadrons
- List of F-100 units of the United States Air Force
