= 389th Fighter Squadron =

US Air Force unit

389th Fighter Squadron

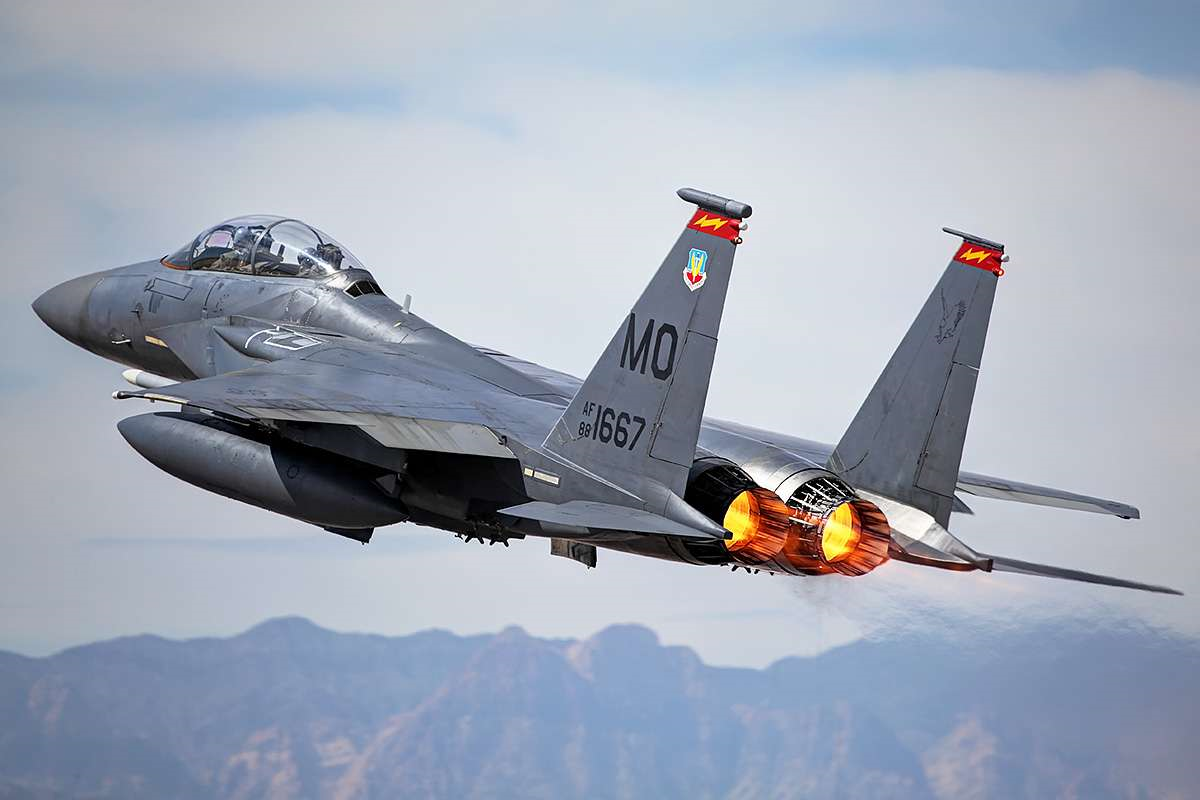
- 389th Squadron F-15E
- Active: 1943–1946; 1953–1959; 1962–1991; 1992–present
- Country: United States
- Branch: United States Air Force
- Role: Fighter
- Part of: Air Combat Command
- Garrison/HQ: Mountain Home Air Force Base
- Nickname(s): Thunderbolts, "TBolts"
- Motto(s): "Shock 'Em"
- Engagements: European Theater of Operations of World War II; Vietnam War; War in Afghanistan (2001-2021)
- Decorations: Distinguished Unit Citation; Presidential Unit Citation; Air Force Outstanding Unit Award with Combat "V" Device; Air Force Outstanding Unit Award; Belgian Fourragère; Republic of Vietnam Gallantry Cross with Palm

Commanders
- Notable commanders: Lt. Col. John B. England; Major Harold E. Comstock (later Colonel)

Insignia
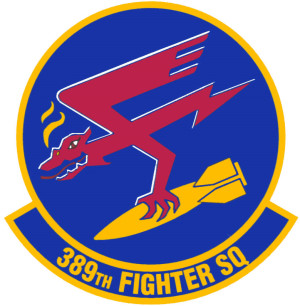
- 389th Fighter Squadron emblem (approved 15 September 1993)

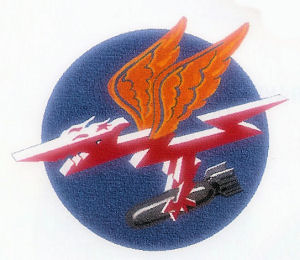
- Original 389th Fighter Squadron emblem (approved 13 February 1945)

The 389th Fighter Squadron is part of the 366th Fighter Wing at Mountain Home Air Force Base, Idaho. It operates the multi-role McDonnell Douglas F-15E Strike Eagle aircraft specializing in tactical intercepts, offensive and defensive counter air, and close air support. The 389FS "Thunderbolts" conducts training exercises across the US, such as Red Flag and William Tell, and regularly deploys to support US operations overseas.

== History ==
=== World War II ===
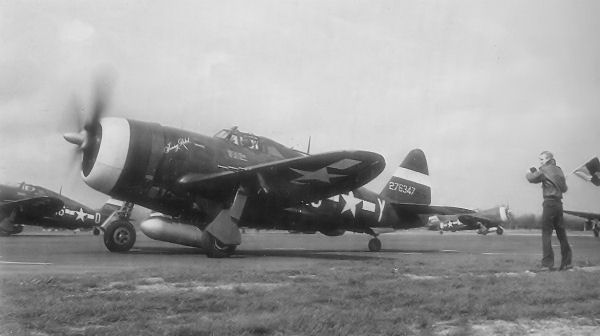
389th Fighter Squadron Republic P-47D Thunderbolt (Note: Aircraft is Republic P-47D-15-RE Thunderbolt serial 42-76347 nicknamed "Jenny Rebel")

The 389th flew combat in the European Theater of Operations from 14 March 1943 to 3 May 1945.

The 389th Fighter Squadron, led by Colonel Meyer, participated in its first combat mission on March 14, 1944, under Field Order #78 from Headquarters, Ninth Fighter Command. Eighteen P-47's took part in this mission which was a fighter sweep into France with the Bayeux-St Aubin area as the target. After briefing at 0600 in the group briefing room, they took off at 0745, experienced very little flak and no contact with E/A, returning undamaged. By the end of March the squadron comprising 59 Officers and 253 Enlisted Men had flown a total of 16 missions.

==== Post WWII - Cold War ====
Lt. Col. John B. England, who was commander of the 389th Fighter-Bomber Squadron from Alexandria AFB, was killed when his F-86 crashed into the woods near Toul-Rosières Air Base. He was returning from gunnery practice near Tripoli, Libya. The fog was very thick and visibility was near zero. After several attempts to locate the runway his plane suffered fuel starvation. At this moment he sighted a portion of the runway and was in a glide with a high probability of a successful landing. But his glide path took him over the barracks where his men were housed. He calmly stated on the radio that this was not an acceptable risk. He turned and crashed into a wooded area outside the base perimeter. In his honor, Alexandria AFB was renamed England Air Force Base, and retained that name until its closure in 1993.

=== Vietnam War ===
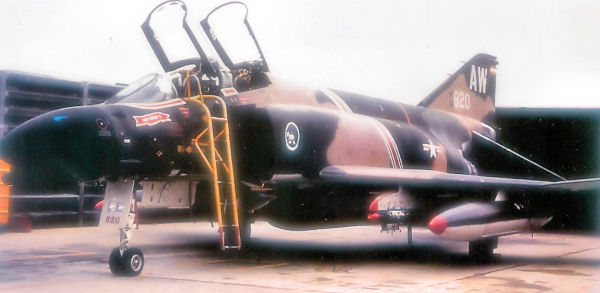
389th Tactical Fighter Squadron F-4D (Note: Aircraft is McDonnell F-4D-33-MC Phantom II serial 66-8820.)

The squadron flew combat operations in Southeast Asia from 14 March 1966 to 8 October 1971.

=== Recent operations ===
The squadron trained F-111 Aardvark aircrews from 30 September 1979 to 26 June 1991. It rotated aircraft and personnel to Southwest Asia throughout the 1990s in support of Operation Southern Watch. It furnished resources for units participating in Operation Enduring Freedom and Operation Noble Eagle following the 11 September 2001 terrorist attacks on the United States. Pilots and aircraft deployed from unit conducted close air support mission after 2005, although the unit itself remained in the United States.

== Lineage ==
- Constituted as the 389th Fighter Squadron (Single-Engine) on 24 May 1943

Activated on 1 June 1943
Redesignated 389th Fighter Squadron, Single-Engine on 20 August 1943
Inactivated on 20 August 1946

- Redesignated 389th Fighter-Bomber Squadron on 15 August 1952

Activated on 1 January 1953
Redesignated 389th Tactical Fighter Squadron on 1 July 1958
Inactivated on 1 April 1959

- Activated on 30 April 1962 (not organized)

Organized on 8 May 1962
Redesignated 389th Tactical Fighter Training Squadron on 30 September 1979
Inactivated on 22 July 1991

- Redesignated 389th Fighter Squadron on 1 March 1992

Activated on 11 March 1992

=== Assignments ===
- 366th Fighter Group, 1 June 1943 – 20 August 1946
- 366th Fighter-Bomber Group, 1 January 1953 (attached to Twelfth Air Force 29 September–17 November 1954, 48th Fighter-Bomber Wing 18 November 1954 – 28 March 1955, United States Air Forces in Europe c. 20 September-c. 3 October 1956, 21st Fighter-Bomber Wing after 10 June 1957)
- 366th Fighter-Bomber Wing (later 366th Tactical Fighter Wing), 25 September 1957 – 1 April 1959 (remained attached to 21 Fighter-Bomber Wing to c. Oct 1957, attached to 388th Fighter-Bomber Wing, c. Oct-9 Dec 1957, 49th Fighter-Bomber Wing 10–22 December 1957)
- United States Air Forces in Europe, 30 April 1962 (not organized)
- 366th Tactical Fighter Wing, 8 May 1962 (attached to Alaskan Air Command, 15 September–16 December 1965)
- 37th Tactical Fighter Wing, 15 June 1969
- 12th Tactical Fighter Wing, 31 March 1970
- 347th Tactical Fighter Wing, 15 October 1971
- 366th Tactical Fighter Wing, 31 October 1972 – 22 July 1991
- 366th Operations Group, 11 March 1992 – present

=== Stations ===
- Richmond Army Air Base, Virginia, VA 1 June 1943
- Bluethenthal Field, North Carolina, 9 August 1943
- Richmond Army Air Base, Virginia, Virginia, 6 November–17 December 1943
- RAF Membury (Station 466), England, 12 January 1944
- RAF Thruxton (Station 407), England, 29 February 1944
- Saint-Pierre-du-Mont Airfield (A-1), France, 17 Jun 194[4]
- Dreux/Vernouillet Airfield (B-52), France, 24 August 1944
- Laon/Couvron Airfield (A-70), France, 12 September 1944
- Asch Airfield (Assche) (Y-29), Belgium, 20 November 1944
- Münster-Handorf Airfield (Y-94), Germany, 14 April 1945
- Bayreuth-Bindlach Airfield (R-26), Germany, 28 June 1945
- Fritzlar Airfield (later AAF Station Fritzlar), Germany (Y-86), 11 September 1945 – 20 Aug ust1946
- Alexandria Air Force Base (later England Air Force Base), Louisiana, 1 January 1953 – 1 April 1959

Deployed to:

Toul-Rosières Air Base, France, 29 September–10 December 1954
Chaumont Air Base, France (11 December 1954 – 28 March 1955)
Aviano Air Base, Italy, 21 September–2 October 1956, 10 June–22 December 1957
Chaumont Air Base, France, 8 May 1962

- Holloman Air Force Base, New Mexico, 12 July 1963 – 11 March 1966 (deployed to Elmendorf Air Force Base, Alaska 15 September–16 December 1965)
- Phan Rang Air Base, South Vietnam, 14 March 1966
- Da Nang Air Base, South Vietnam, 10 October 1966
- Phù Cát Air Base, South Vietnam, 25 June 1969 – 15 October 1971
- Mountain Home Air Force Base, Idaho, 15 October 1971 – 22 July 1991

Deployed to Taegu Air Base, South Korea, 16 September–5 October 1976

- Mountain Home Air Force Base, Idaho, 11 March 1992 – present

=== Aircraft ===
- Republic P-47 Thunderbolt (1943–1946)
- North American P-51 Mustang (1953)
- North American F-86 Sabre (1953–1955)
- Republic F-84 Thunderjet (1955–1958, 1962–1965)
- North American F-100 Super Sabre (1958, 1963)
- McDonnell F-4 Phantom II (1965–1971)
- General Dynamics F-111 AardvarkF then A model (1971–1991)
- General Dynamics F-16 Fighting Falcon (1992–2007)
- McDonnell Douglas F-15E Strike Eagle (2007–present)

== Current Operations ==
=== Operations ===
In recent years, the Thunderbolts have served as a leading example of fighter aircraft war fighting capability, especially through exceptional demonstrations of Agile Combat Employment in 2024 and 2025. After one highly successful deployed operation, the 389th Fighter Squadron was recognized by President Biden as an "exceptional group of men and women. Among the greatest mankind has ever known."

=== Culture ===
An important aspect of fighter aviation culture is the use of callsigns. The 389FS uniquely grants new members with the callsign "Sparky" immediately upon arrival to the squadron. Symbolizing a small or "baby" Thunderbolt, the name Sparky speaks to the innocence of the new members. Not yet tampered by war and the mistakes and experiences that inevitably accompany it, Sparkies bear a badge of purity among the squadron. As such, they are bestowed with duties that others are not permitted - namely preparing food and snacks (such as popcorn) for the squadron. Sparkies are the social life-blood, maintaining the youthfulness of the squadron.

After deployment to a combat environment, or gaining sufficient experience to no longer be considered a new member of the squadron, the name Sparky is retired, allowing other young members to take up title and continue to carry the torch of youth and innocence.
