= Harold E. Comstock =

American fighter ace

Harold Elwood Comstock
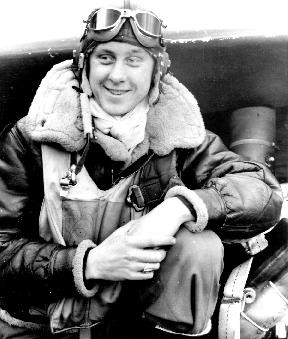
- Harold E. Comstock in front of his P-47
- Born: December 20, 1920; Fresno, California, U.S.
- Died: April 3, 2009 (aged 88); Clovis, California, U.S.
- Military career
- Allegiance: United States
- Branch: United States Air Force
- Service years: 1941–1971
- Rank: Colonel
- Nicknames: "Bunny" and "Hal"
- Commands: 63d Fighter Squadron; 389th Fighter Squadron; 390th Fighter Squadron; 481st Tactical Fighter Squadron; 602nd Tactical Air Control Group
- Conflicts: World War II; Vietnam War
- Awards: Legion of Merit (2); Distinguished Flying Cross (7); Purple Heart; Air Medal (17)

Harold Elwood "Bunny" Comstock (20 December 1920 – 3 April 2009) was an American fighter ace in the 56th Fighter Group during World War II, and a career fighter pilot in the United States Air Force. After a test flight of the Republic P-47 Thunderbolt on 13 November 1942, Republic Aviation issued a press release on 1 December 1942 claiming that he and fellow pilot, Lieutenant Roger Dyar had exceeded the speed of sound.

== Early life ==
Harold Comstock was the eldest son of Clinton E. Comstock and Millie L. Daw. He was an Eagle Scout in the Boy Scouts of America and started flying at fifteen. After graduation from Theodore Roosevelt High School (Fresno), he attended Fresno State College for two years to complete the requirements to apply to the United States Army Air Corps. On 1 October 1941, Comstock was ordered to report to Kelly Field, Texas for aviation cadet training.

== Aviation career ==
Comstock then attended primary flying school at Sikeston, Missouri, basic flying school at Randolph AFB and he graduated from advanced flying school at Foster Field, Texas on 3 July 1942. He received his commission and pilot wings and then returned to Fresno, California to marry Barbara L. Joint. Comstock reported for duty with the 56th Fighter Group at Bridgeport, Connecticut on 20 July 1942. His wife gave him the nickname "Bunny Nose" and when the other pilots found out, the nickname of "Bunny" stayed with him.

== The Dive ==
Because of the need to manufacture combat aircraft quickly and the close proximity to the Republic Aviation factory, active duty pilots were used for some of the test flights of the new P-47. On 13 November 1942, Lieutenants Comstock and Dyar were ordered to test a new type of radio antenna on the P-47C. Lt. Comstock climbed to an indicated altitude of 49,600 feet (15,100 meters) while trying to reach 50,000 feet. Due to poor response from the controls, he decided to let the aircraft fall off rather than risk a spin. He started to dive straight down and after passing below 40,000 feet he found that his controls had frozen. Comstock then felt a bump and was unable to move the controls as the aircraft continued to dive. Even with maximum exertion, he was unable to move the control stick so he started to roll the trim tab back and after passing below 30,000 feet, the aircraft started to pull out of the dive and he recovered between 20,000 and 25,000 feet. Lt. Dyar started his dive and encountered the same conditions.

After landing, Comstock reported what happened and the chief designer of the P-47 Thunderbolt, Alexander Kartveli, questioned Lt. Comstock at length and made numerous calculations. Republic Aviation soon issued a press release claiming that Lts. Comstock and Dyar had exceeded the speed of sound. This was picked up in the national media and also drawn in Ripley's Believe It or Not! Soon after the press release, the 56th Fighter Group received a telegram from Gen. Henry "Hap" Arnold that "there would be no more discussion about the dive". The actual speed attained was probably less than the speed of sound but this speed which caused the flight controls to lock up was referred to as "compressibility". This effect was encountered by many pilots flying in combat but training and proper procedures allowed them to recover from it.

A detailed account of the dive can be found in the Spring 1998 Journal, American Aviation Historical Society on pages 45–52.

In 1959, the Air Force published "A Chronology of American Aerospace Events" and included an entry for 15 November 1942 which stated "Lts. Harold Comstock and Roger Dyar set a new speed record for airplanes when they power-dived their P-47 fighters at 725 mph from 35,000 feet over an east coast air base." While the Air Force acknowledged the speed of 725 miles per hour, it could not confirm whether the P-47 could actually exceed the speed of sound in a dive. Capt. Roger Dyar was killed in action on 26 June 1943.

In response to the claim by Republic Aviation of a P-47 achieving supersonic speeds, Curtiss-Wright test pilot Herbert O. Fisher later observed, "We knew about Mach 1 going clear back to the P-36 and the P-40 ... Nothing could go 600 mph in level flight, but pilots were beginning to dive fighters. We ran into compressibility back in '38." (Note: In a bit of grim humor, British test pilot Eric Brown said diving the P-47 at anything over Mach 0.74 was called "The Graveyard Dive".) Using a highly modified P-47D, from 1947 to 1949, Fisher carried out 100 high mach number precision dives from 38,000 feet at speeds from 500 to 590 miles per hour. Several of these dives resulted in speeds of Mach .83, one occurring on October 27, 1949, the fastest speeds a P-47 could attain.

== World War II ==
On 6 January 1943, the 56th Fighter Group sailed for England on the RMS Queen Elizabeth, and flew their first operational mission on 13 April 1943. Lieutenant Comstock was promoted to first lieutenant on 29 May 1943 and achieved his first aerial victory on 17 August 1943, when he shot down a Messerschmitt Bf 109. He had additional confirmed victories on 4 October 1943, and 26 November 1943. After a long engagement with enemy aircraft on 3 February 1944, he did not have enough fuel to make it to a runway and was injured in a crash landing near Halesworth, England. He was promoted to captain on 12 March 1944 and following recovery from his crash landing, Comstock returned to flying combat missions.

Comstock returned to the United States for 30 days leave in late May following completion of his first combat tour. After he returned to the 56th Fighter Group for a second combat tour, he took command of the 63d Fighter Squadron on 19 July 1944. Comstock was promoted to major on 17 September 1944. In support of Operation Market Garden, Major Comstock led the 56th Fighter Group on a disastrous mission that had been ordered to go "at all costs" to provide flak suppression. Numerous anti-aircraft batteries were destroyed and the 56th Fighter Group received a Distinguished Unit Citation for this mission but 16 of 39 aircraft were lost and 15 of the returning aircraft were damaged.

Comstock's last two victories were on 23 December 1944. After two combat tours and 136 missions, Comstock returned to the United States in January 1945. He then checked out in the P-51 Mustang and was ordered to the Pacific for more combat. He was on a train headed for San Francisco when Japan surrendered.

=== Summary of enemy aircraft damaged/destroyed ===
Date	Location	Air/Ground	Number	Type	Status
17 August 1943	Near Ans, Belgium	Air	1	Bf 109	Destroyed
4 October 1943	Bruhl, Germany	Air	1	Bf 110	Destroyed
4 October 1943	Bruhl, Germany	Air	1	Bf 109	Damaged/Probably Destroyed
4 October 1943	Bruhl, Germany	Ground	1	Ju 88	Destroyed
26 November 1943	Friesoythe, Germany	Air	1	Bf 110	Destroyed
26 November 1943	Friesoythe, Germany	Air	1	Bf 109	Damaged
26 November 1943	Friesoythe, Germany	Air	1	Fw 190	Damaged
29 November 1943	Papenburg, Germany	Air	1	Bf 109	Damaged/Probably Destroyed
29 January 1944	South of Bonn, Germany	Air	1	Fw 190	Damaged
24 February 1944	Peterhagen, Germany	Air	1	Fw 190	Damaged
16 September 1944	Ahlhorn Aerodrome, Germany	Ground	1	He 177	Destroyed
18 November 1944	Gross Ostheim Aerodrome, Germany	Ground	1	He 111	Destroyed
23 December 1944	Southwest of Bonn, Germany	Air	2	Fw 190	Damaged
23 December 1944	Southwest of Bonn, Germany	Air	2	Fw 190	Destroyed

Following World War II, Major Comstock had the following assignments:

- April 1945 – July 1945: Standardization/Evaluation pilot, 72nd Fighter Wing, Peterson Field, Colorado Springs, Colorado.
- July 1945 – October 1945: Commander, 10th Fighter Squadron, 50th Fighter Group, La Junta, Colorado. This unit was equipped with P-47 Thunderbolts and the unit had orders to Ie Shima off the coast of Okinawa for combat against Japan. The unit was en route to California by train to ship out when the war ended.
- October 1945 – August 1946: Assigned to the Manpower Branch, Headquarters, United States Air Force, The Pentagon.
- August 1946 – January 1947: North American P-51 Mustang Acrobatic Team Leader, Hamilton Air Force Base, Novato, California.
- January 1947 – June 1947: Plans Branch, Hamilton Air Force Base, Novato, California.
- June 1947 – July 1949: Chief of Training, 13th Air Force and 2d Air Division, and Pilot, 301st Fighter Wing, Kadena Air Base, Okinawa.
- July 1949 – November 1950: Squadron Commander of the Jet Training Squadron, Instructor Pilot, Williams Air Force Base, Chandler, Arizona.
- November 1950 – August 1953: Liaison duty and advisor to the Belgian Air Force, Florennes Air Base, Belgium, where he flew the Republic F-84F Thunderstreak.
- September 1953 – October 1954: Commander of the 390th Fighter Squadron, England Air Force Base, Alexandria, Louisiana, where he again flew the Republic F-84F Thunderstreak and then the North American F-86 Sabre. Promoted to LtCol on 14 April 1954.
- November 1954 – August 1956: Following the death of LtCol John B. England, assumed command of the 389th Fighter Squadron, England Air Force Base, Alexandria, Louisiana.
- August 1956 – August 1957: Attended the Air War College at Maxwell Air Force Base, Montgomery, Alabama.
- August 1957 – June 1960: Instructor at the Naval War College, Newport, Rhode Island.
- June 1960 – June 1963: Director of reconnaissance CINCPAC, Camp Smith, Hawaii. Responsible for all reconnaissance in the "western" half of the world. Completed his B.S. in psychology at Jackson College (Hawaii-Pacific University) in Honolulu.
- June 1963 – July 1966: Commander of the 481st Tactical Fighter Squadron, Cannon Air Force Base, Clovis, New Mexico.
- July 1966 – July 1969: Promoted to colonel. Director of counter offensive operations for PACAF at Hickam Air Force Base, Hawaii until 1968, and then director of training for Pacific Air Forces.
- July 1969 – September 1971: Commander, 602nd Tactical Air Control Group, Bergstrom Air Force Base, Austin, Texas.
- 30 September 1971: Retired after 30 years of service.

== Vietnam ==
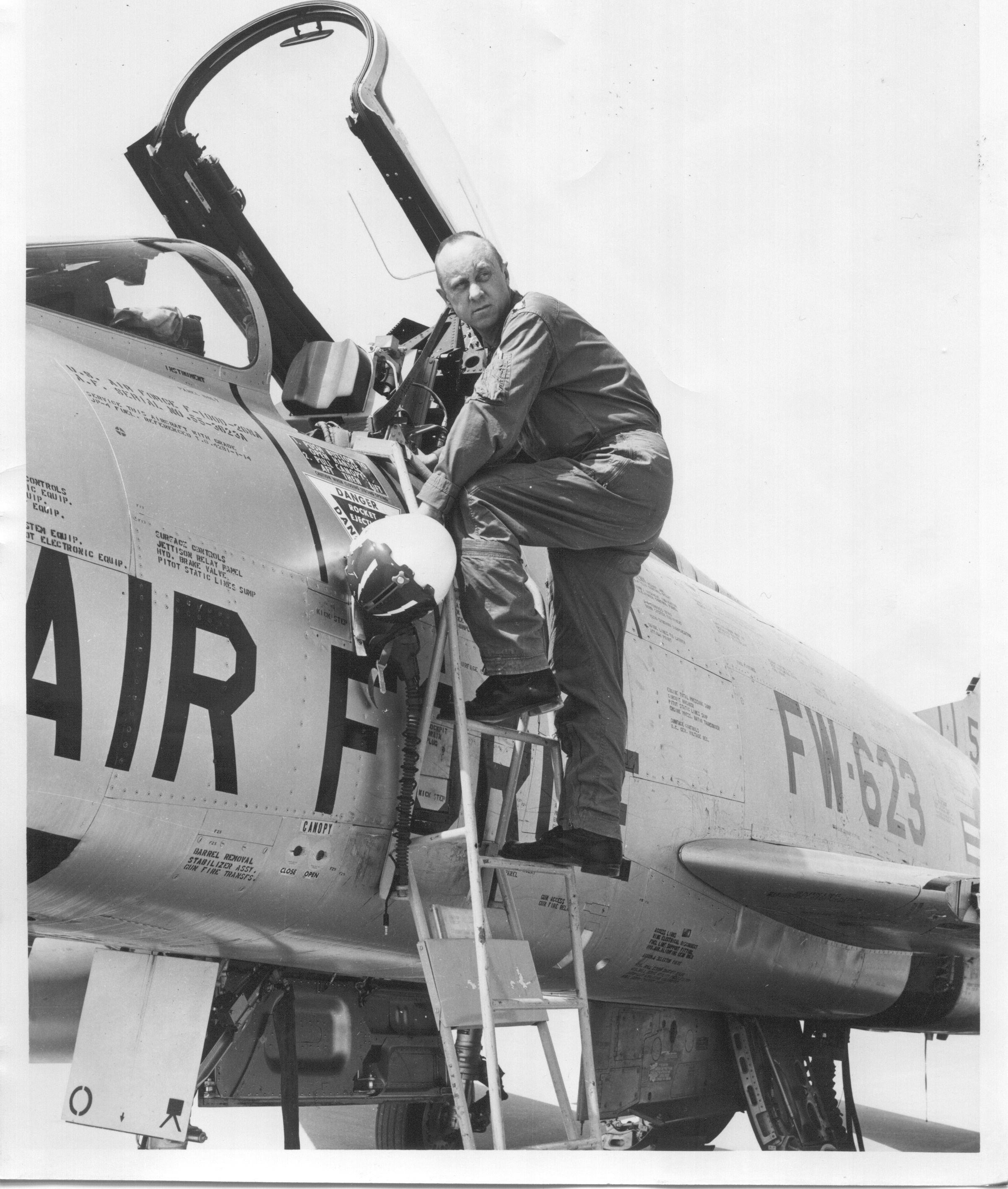
LtCol Harold E. Comstock with F-100

While assigned to Cannon AFB, Lieutenant Colonel Comstock commanded the 481st Tactical Fighter Squadron, which was deployed to Tan Son Nhut Air Base, Vietnam, in June 1965. On this tour, Comstock completed 132 combat missions and the squadron flew numerous combat sorties in support of the besieged troops at Plei Me and the Battle of Ia Drang Valley. On 15 November 1965, Comstock was flying the second of two North American F-100 Super Sabres that approached Landing Zone X-Ray with instructions to drop napalm. The napalm from the first aircraft landed too close to American lines and resulted in American casualties. Comstock was about to release his load of napalm on the assigned area when a quick call instructed him to break off. If he had dropped the napalm on the target as instructed, it would have killed Hal Moore, Joe Galloway, Basil Plumley, and numerous other soldiers of the 7th Cavalry. This battle, in the Ia Drang Valley, is detailed in the book and movie We Were Soldiers Once ... And Young.

During the spring of 1968, Comstock had another tour in Vietnam as the 7th ABCCC "Cricket" commander and directed numerous missions in support of the Battle of Khe Sanh. He also directed numerous fighter missions in support of the Hmong fighting in Laos and was given a traditional hand-made rifle by MG Vang Pao as thanks for his efforts. The rifle was later donated to the Fresno Veterans Memorial Museum.

== Retirement ==
By the time he retired, he had flown over 5,500 hours in more than 30 different types of civilian and military airplanes including 875 hours of combat time. His official Air Force flight records listed flying time in the A-1 Skyraider, B-17 Flying Fortress, B-24 Liberator, B-25 Mitchell, B-26 Marauder, B-29 Superfortress, C-45 Expeditor, C-47 Skytrain, C-61 Forwarder, C-78 Bobcat, C-130 Hercules, EC-135 Looking Glass, F-80 Shooting Star, F-84 Thunderjet, F-86 Sabrejet, F-100 Super Sabre, F-102 Delta Dagger, F-105 Thunderchief, F2H Banshee, L-4B Grasshopper, PT-19, P-40 Warhawk, P-47 Thunderbolt, P-51 Mustang, P-61 Black Widow, Spitfire XIV, SA-16 Albatross, SV-4 (Belgian Air Force), T-6 Texan, T-28 Trojan, and T-33 T-Bird.

After retirement, Harold Comstock and his wife, Barbara, returned to Fresno, California and subsequently, built a home in Auberry, California. He took an active interest in genealogy and became a member of the Mayflower Society; he was also a Freemason, a Shriner and a 32° Mason in the Scottish Rite. Later, he served on the Fresno County Planning Commission for six years. Harold Elwood Comstock died at the age of 88 on 3 April 2009.

== Awards and decorations ==

Command pilot

Legion of Merit With 1 oak leaf cluster
Distinguished Flying Cross, With 6 oak leaf clusters.
Purple Heart
Air Medal With 16 oak leaf clusters
Joint Service Commendation Medal
Air Force Commendation Medal
Air Force Presidential Unit Citation With 1 oak leaf cluster
Army Meritorious Unit Commendation With 1 oak leaf cluster
Air Force Outstanding Unit Award With 2 oak leaf clusters
American Defense Service Medal
American Campaign Medal
European-African-Middle Eastern Campaign Medal With 1 silver campaign star
World War II Victory Medal
Army of Occupation Medal
National Defense Service Medal With 1 service star
Armed Forces Expeditionary Medal With 1 oak leaf cluster
Vietnam Service Medal With 2 campaign stars
Air Force Longevity Service Award, With 6 oak leaf clusters
Small Arms Expert Marksmanship Ribbon
Vietnam Gallantry Cross Unit Citation
Vietnam Campaign Medal
