= 366th Fighter Wing =

Active US Air Force unit

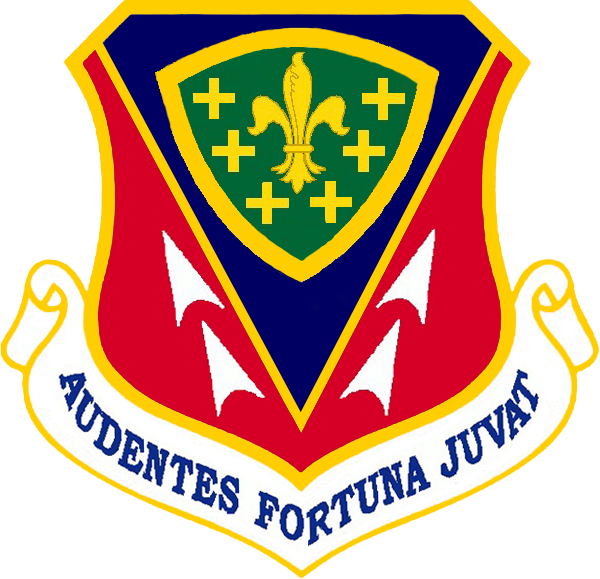
- Emblem of the 366th Fighter Wing
- Active: 1953–present
- Country: United States
- Branch: U.S. Air Force
- Part of: Fifteenth Air Force
- Garrison/HQ: Mountain Home AFB
- Motto: Latin: Audentes Fortuna Juvat ("Fortune Favors the Bold")
- Engagements: World War II; Vietnam War; Desert Storm; Operation Enduring Freedom; Operation Iraqi Freedom
- Decorations: DUC PUC AFOUA w/ V Device RVGC w/ Palm

Commanders
- Current commander: Col. David R. Gunter
- Vice commander: Col. Kyle Rykaczewski
- Command Chief: CCM Gerardo Marquez Jr.
- Notable commanders: Maj. Gen. David Iverson

The 366th Fighter Wing (366 FW) is a fighter wing of the United States Air Force Air Combat Command stationed at Mountain Home Air Force Base, Idaho.

== Units ==
The wing comprises four groups: the 366th Operations Group, 366th Maintenance Group, 366th Mission Support Group and 366th Medical Group.

The wing is home to three fighter squadrons: the 389th Fighter Squadron and 391st Fighter Squadron flying the F-15E Strike Eagle aircraft and the 428th Fighter Squadron which flies the Republic of Singapore Air Force F-15SG. Until September 2010, a fourth squadron, the 390th Fighter Squadron flew the F-15C Eagle in an air superiority mission. The 417th Tactical Fighter Squadron flew F-4D Phantoms and later F-111's. In September 2010 the redesignated 390th Electronic Combat Squadron assumed the mission of the 388th Electronic Combat Squadron and its F-15C/D aircraft redistributed to other F-15 units pursuant to a 2005 BRAC decision.

The 726th Air Control Squadron assigned here gives an air picture to the aircraft as they train. This is a mobile radar unit that routinely deploys to various theaters to operate command and control functions. Structured as a Control and Reporting Center, able to accommodate Control and Reporting Post function. Air Weapons Controller personnel often deploy without home-system to support flying units in various scenarios and exercises throughout the U.S. and European theater. An active Air National Guard unit, the 266th Range Squadron, controls and maintains emitter sites within the 7,412-square-mile (19,200 km^{2}) operational training range located in southern Idaho.

Additionally, the 390th Electronic Combat Squadron, located at Naval Air Station Whidbey Island, Washington, is assigned to the 366th Operations Group. The squadron, consisting of USAF flight crews flying U.S. Navy EA-6B Prowler and EA-18G Growler aircraft, is responsible for suppression of enemy air defenses in support of expeditionary aircraft and ground troops by disrupting enemy electronic activity and obtaining tactical electronic intelligence.

== History ==
For additional history and lineage, see 366th Operations Group

The wing was activated on 1 January 1953 as the 366th Fighter Bomber Wing at Alexandria Air Force Base, Louisiana. It replaced the Federalized Iowa Air National Guard 132d Fighter Bomber Wing which was being returned to state control after a twenty-one-month period of activation as a result of the Korean War. Initially using the former ANG F-51D Mustangs, the 366th received F-86F Sabres which were returned from Korea in the summer of 1953, then received new swept-wing F-84F Thunderstreaks in early 1954. On 18 March 1954, the KB-29 equipped 420th Air Refueling Squadron was attached to the Wing to provide air refueling for the Thunderstreaks. The B-29s were later replaced with KB-50 aerial tankers.

The Wing became first TAC unit to perform six-month TDY rotations with NATO at Aviano AB, Italy, with rotations continuing to both Italy and France for six-month stretches. As it did so, the wing also began converting to the F-84F Thunderstreak. The 366th Fighter Day Group was inactivated in September 1957 when parent wing adopted Tri-Deputate organization and assigned operational squadrons directly to the wing.

In late 1957, the wing began conversion to the F-100 Super Sabre to its inventory while continuing to operate the F-84. Redesignated 366th Tactical Fighter Wing 1 July 1958 as part of Air Force-Wide naming change. Inactivated 1 April 1959 as part of a general budgetary reduction of USAF wings. Aircraft transferred to Air National Guard.

=== 366th Tactical Fighter Wing ===
==== Chaumont-Semoutiers Air Base ====
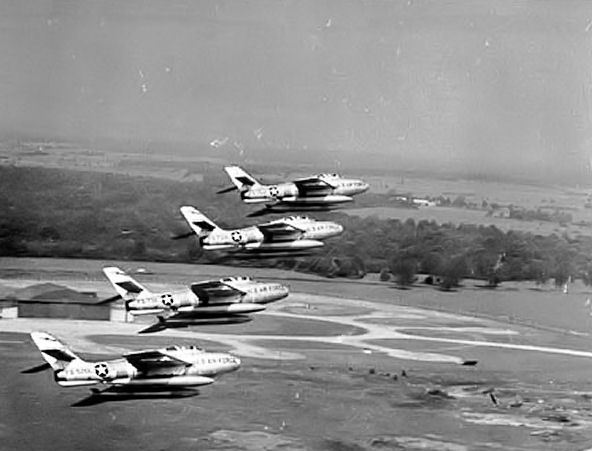
F-84Fs from the 7108th Tactical Wing in formation over Chaumont – 1962. With the end of the Berlin Crisis, these aircraft were reassigned to the 366th Tactical Fighter Wing.

On 8 May 1962, the 366th Tactical Fighter Wing was activated at Chaumont-Semoutiers Air Base, France with four Tactical Fighter Squadrons, formed by absorbing the assets and personnel of the provisional 7108th Tactical Wing, formed from the assets of several Air National Guard squadrons rushed to France in the wake of the Berlin Crisis of 1961, then as the ANG personnel were demobilized, personnel were drawn from the active-duty ranks to man the organization.

With Wing Headquarters at Chaumont AB, the 366th TFW was organized in France as follows:

- 389th Tactical Fighter Squadron (Chaumont AB Blue striping)
- 390th Tactical Fighter Squadron (Chambley-Bussieres Air Base Yellow striping)
- 391st Tactical Fighter Squadron (Etain-Rouvres Air Base Red striping)
- 480th Tactical Fighter Squadron (Phalsbourg-Bourscheid Air Base Green striping)

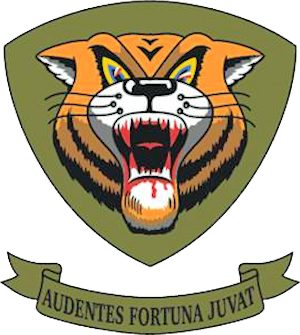
Emblem of the 366th Fighter-Bomber/Tactical Fighter Wing (1953–1959;1962–1963)

The 480th TFS operated at Chaumont until runway repairs were completed at Phalsbourg Air Base then deployed there on 20 December. This multi-base organizational structure was unique in that it was the only tactical fighter wing in USAFE with four squadrons at four different air bases in Europe. The 366th was also the last USAFE tactical fighter wing formed in Europe. Each squadron flew 20 F-84F Thunderstreaks left by the departing Air National Guard Units. In addition to the flying units being dispersed, the 366th also formed Combat Support Groups at each base to support the flying operations.

The decision to form, organize, equip and train the 366th at four different bases was a poor decision by USAFE. The first major problem being the simple logistics needed to operate the squadrons. Deliveries of services in France had always been a problem since the USAF bases were established in the early 1950s. Delivery of supplies and equipment sometimes took months, not weeks. In addition, the F-84 was being phased out of the USAF since 1958 and there was a shortage of pilots and trained mechanics in USAFE for the model. Personnel issues such as married personnel avoiding assignments in France due to poor housing conditions meant that most assigned personnel were first-term airmen with little, or elementary job skills. Also, the cost of maintaining USAFE bases in France were significantly higher.

In October 1962 the 366th was needed to respond to the Cuban Missile Crisis, assuming a 24/7 alert posture for two weeks beginning on 23 October. Some deployed aircraft were called back from Wheelus Air Base Libya where they were undergoing training. Targets in Eastern Europe were identified and changed on a daily, sometimes hourly schedule. Two KB-50 tankers were flown into Chaumont to provide aerial refueling to the tactical aircraft if necessary. On 5 November, the 24/7 alert was stood down and operations returned to normal peacetime levels.

Unlike their Air National Guard predecessors, HQ USAFE did not provide the 366th with a definitive mission statement. The wing simply continued to build on the 7108th Tactical Wing's missions. These were expanded to include the capability to receive and support dual-based CONUS tactical fighter squadrons. Plans were made for the 366th to absorb up to four additional fighter squadrons and operate from three additional NATO Dispersed Operating Bases.

A result of French president Charles de Gaulle's deep suspicion of "supranational organizations" and France's shift away from the NATO orbit in the early 1960s ultimately led to the decision in November 1962 that Chambley, Chaumont, Etain and Phalsbourg air bases would be returned to reserve status.

On 26 April 1963 the 366 TFW was notified of its pending relocation to Holloman AFB, New Mexico. The initial deployment of personnel began on 4 June. Personnel and equipment were either moved to Holloman, or reassigned throughout USAFE. The 366th officially departed Chaumont on 22 July 1963.

==== Holloman Air Force Base ====
The wing returned to the United States in July 1963 and its new home at Holloman AFB, New Mexico.

At Holloman, the wing began converting to the new F-4C Phantom II in February 1965. Later that year, the wing sent its first squadron to the Republic of Vietnam. The 390th Fighter Squadron was deployed to Da Nang Air Base (6252d Tactical Wing) in October 1965, and the 391st went to Cam Ranh Bay Air Base (12th Tactical Fighter Wing) in January 1966.

In March 1966, HQ 366th Tactical Fighter Wing, the 389th TFS and various support units of the wing entered the conflict and were reassigned to Phan Rang Air Base, Republic of Vietnam as the base host organization.

==== Phan Rang Air Base ====
The 366th arrived at Phan Rang Air Base in March 1966. It was an air base dating back to World War II, used by the Japanese and French. To accommodate the expanding Vietnam War, Phan Rang was expanded by the USAF in 1966 to accommodate both American and South Vietnamese fighter and helicopter units. The 366th was the first permanent USAF organization to be stationed at the base. The wing was composed of a mixture of F-100 Super Sabre and F-4C Phantom II squadrons, deployed from several Tactical Air Command wings:

- 352d Tactical Fighter Squadron, F-100D/F, deployed from the 354th TFW (Tail Code: VM)
- 389th Tactical Fighter Squadron, F-4C, component of the 366th TFW
- 614th Tactical Fighter Squadron, F-100D/F, deployed from the 401st TFW (Tail Code: VP)
- 615th Tactical Fighter Squadron, F-100D/F, deployed from the 401st TFW (Tail Code: VZ)

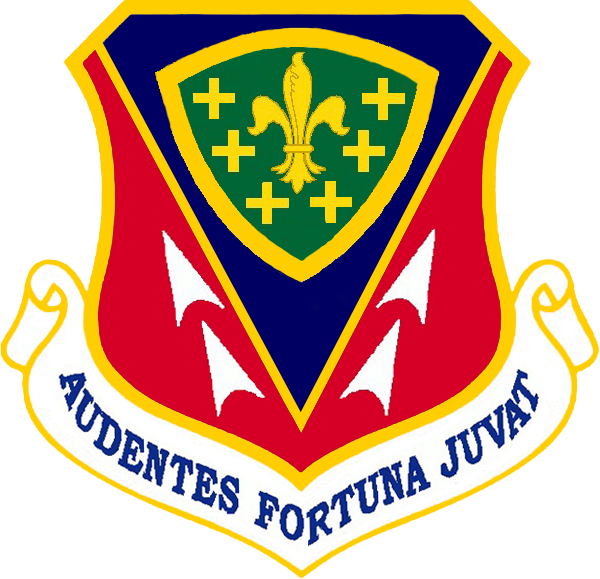
Emblem of the 366th Tactical Fighter Wing and subsequent designations, (after 1965)

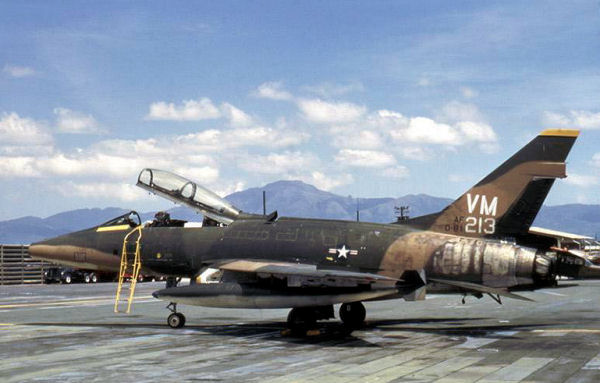
North American F-100F-20-NA Super Sabre Serial 58-1213 of the 352d Fighter Squadron

Missions then flown by the 366th TFW consisted generally of two types—MiG-CAP patrols to protect strike aircraft from attack by marauding North Vietnamese fighters and fighter-bomber strikes carried out with iron bombs against ground targets. The MiG patrols and attacks in North Vietnam were taken over by the F-4s and F-105s based in Thailand, which could carry a larger bomb load further and faster. In addition, the F-105 was built to take the extreme structural loads of low-level, high-speed flight, whereas the F-100 was not. Consequently, the F-100D fighter bombers generally operated only in South Vietnam where the F-100 turned out to be a very effective ground support aircraft, and beat back many enemy attacks.

In October 1966, the F-100-equipped 612th Tactical Fighter Squadron was activated at Phan Rang, composed of former Colorado Air National Guard aircraft which had deployed to Japan and were sent as additional aircraft to Vietnam when their deployment ended. Logistical difficulties in supporting both F-100 and F-4 aircraft at the same base led to the decision to move the 389th TFS to Da Nang Air Base, where F-4Cs were already stationed, and to make Phan Rang an all F-100 base.

As former 366th TFW squadrons were at Da Nang (390th, 480th) already, it was decided to perform a name-only reassignment and move the 366th TFW to Da Nang Air Base as the host unit, and reassign the 35th Tactical Fighter Wing at Da Nang to Phan Rang to become the host unit. This realignment was effective on 1 October 1966 in an administrative change, with no personnel reassignments.

==== Da Nang Air Base ====
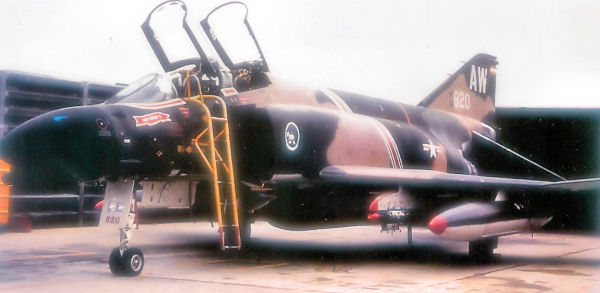
McDonnell F-4D-33-MC Phantom Serial 66-8820 of the 389th Tactical Fighter Squadron.

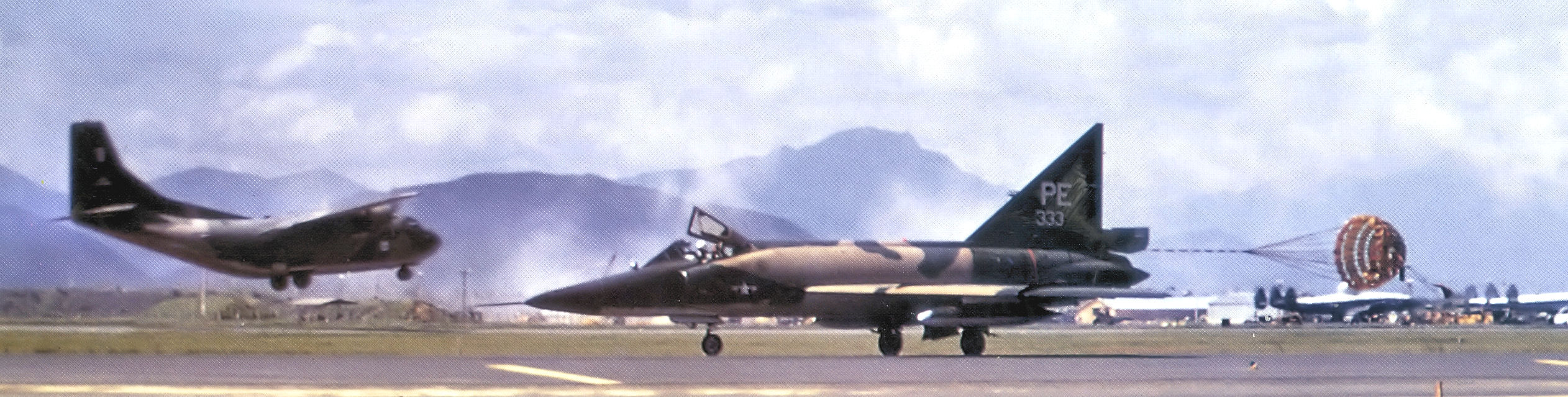
64th Fighter-Interceptor Squadron Convair F-102A-75-CO Delta Dagger 56-1333 landing at Da Nang Air Base, RVN, 1966

The 366th TFW moved to Da Nang AB, Republic of Vietnam and regained the 390th FS on 1 October 1966, becoming the host unit at the larger, sprawling base that accommodated Army, Navy, Marine and Air Force units. The squadrons assigned to the wing at Da Nang were:

- 389th Tactical Fighter Squadron (F-4C/D)
- 390th Tactical Fighter Squadron (F-4C/D)
- 480th Tactical Fighter Squadron (F-4C/D)

In addition to the F-4 squadrons, the 64th Fighter-Interceptor Squadron from Clark Air Base, Philippines rotated F-102 Delta Dagger interceptors to the base from Clark, providing air defense of the facility from any North Vietnamese MiGs. The 64th was actually an Air Defense Command unit from Paine Field, Washington which had been deployed to Clark to provide air defense over several major USAF bases in South Vietnam.

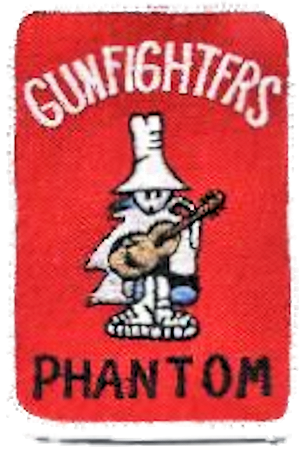
366h TFW "Gunfighter" patch

The mission of the 366th at Da Nang was to support Operation Rolling Thunder; the tactical bombing of enemy targets in North Vietnam by destroying any North Vietnamese Aircraft that would attack the F-105 Thunderchief fighter-bombers carrying out tactical bombing missions. On a typical mission over the North, the F-4Cs from the 366th would carry four AIM-7D/E Sparrows, four AIM-9B/D Sidewinders, and a load of eight 750-pound bombs for bombing operations. At first, the bombs were dropped from medium or high-altitudes, but as SAMs became more dangerous, a shift was made to lower altitudes. Unfortunately, this technique also exposed the aircraft to small-arms fire from the ground

While at Da Nang, aircrews complained that they were missing many opportunities to shoot down enemy MiGs because the F-4C lacked an internal cannon and its missiles were ineffective at short ranges. So, wing maintainers mounted an external 20-millimeter SUU-16/A Gatling gun pod on the F-4Cs, and in less than a month the wing's aircrews had scored four MiG kills. The gun pod innovation and the MiG kills that followed earned the wing the nickname it carries today, the "Gunfighters." During this period, the wing earned a Presidential Unit Citation for shooting down 11 enemy aircraft in a three-month period.

By May 1968, the wing had upgraded to the F-4D aircraft. The "Stormy" FAC effort was begun at Da Nang so that the FACs could be co-located with Wing Intelligence. Two of the wing's pilots began training for forward air control (FAC) duties on 12 August 1968. Other volunteers followed, as FAC missions into North Vietnam's Route Package 1 began on 2 September. The "Stormies" flew two sorties per day of armed reconnaissance along North Vietnamese roads. On 24 October 1968, they began night operations against the Ho Chi Minh Trail. During this short-lived effort, there were six near midair collisions during the first eight missions. Seventh Air Force then held the night FAC missions in abeyance until April 1969. When "Stormy" night ops resumed, it was with use of the Starlight Scope to spot targets, and with support from "Blindbat" and "Candlestick" flareships. In May 1969, the "Stormy" FAC mission requirement was bumped from two to three sorties daily, and their numbers augmented to ten pilots.

In 1969, two additional squadrons of F-4Es (4th TFS w/ tail code "LA" & 421st TFS w/ tail code "LC") joined the wing. After this, the F-4Ds assumed forward air control duties, while the more advanced F-4Es concentrated on aircraft escort duties and conducted ground attack missions. The "Stormy" FACs were the principal forward air control for the Cambodian Incursion of 1970. By November 1971, the 366th was the only United States tactical fighter wing still stationed in Vietnam.

Between 1966 and 1972, the Gunfighters logged 18 confirmed MiG kills in Vietnam. Upon the wing's return to the United States in October 1972, Captain Lance P. Sijan, a 366th pilot shot down in 1967, was posthumously awarded the Medal of Honor for his actions as a prisoner of war.

Beginning in May 1972, the forces of the USAF were drawn down at Da Nang. On 30 June 1972, the 366th TFW was inactivated at Da Nang Air Base, being activated at Takhli Royal Thai Air Force Base, Thailand the same day.

==== Takhli Royal Thai Air Force Base ====
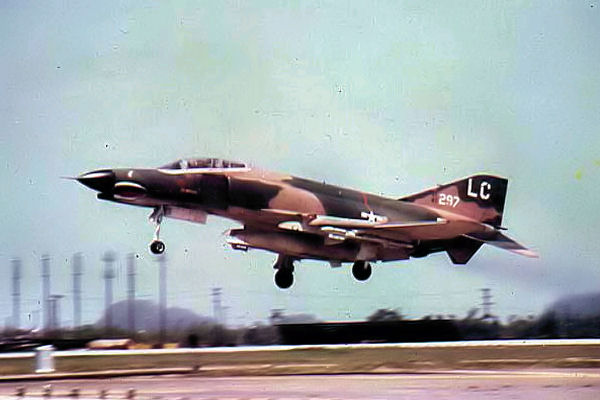
McDonnell Douglas F-4E Phantom II 67-0297 of the 421st Tactical Fighter Squadron c. 1970

At Takhli, the 366th took over host unit responsibilities from the 49th Tactical Fighter Wing, which had deployed from Holloman Air Force Base in early May 1972 in response to the 1972 North Vietnamese Easter Offensive and invasion of South Vietnam by its regular armed forces. The assignment to Takhli was a name-only reassignment, as the wing consisted of four deployed Holloman F-4D squadrons (7th, 8th, 9th and 417th TFS), and two F-4E squadrons (4th, 421st) which were reassigned from Da Nang after the base in South Vietnam was closed.

From Takhli 366th TFW aircrews flew air superiority missions over Vietnam. In addition several AC-130 gunships were deployed to Takhli from the 8th TFW at Ubon. These AC-130s were assigned to Det 1., 16th Special Operations Squadron.

The Holloman-based TDY squadrons returned to New Mexico on 27 October 1972. The 4th and 421st TFSs were transferred to the 432d TRW at Udon RTAFB on 31 October 1972.

The 366th TFW was inactivated on 31 October 1972, and activated the same day without personnel or equipment at Mountain Home Air Force Base, Idaho.

==== Mountain Home Air Force Base ====
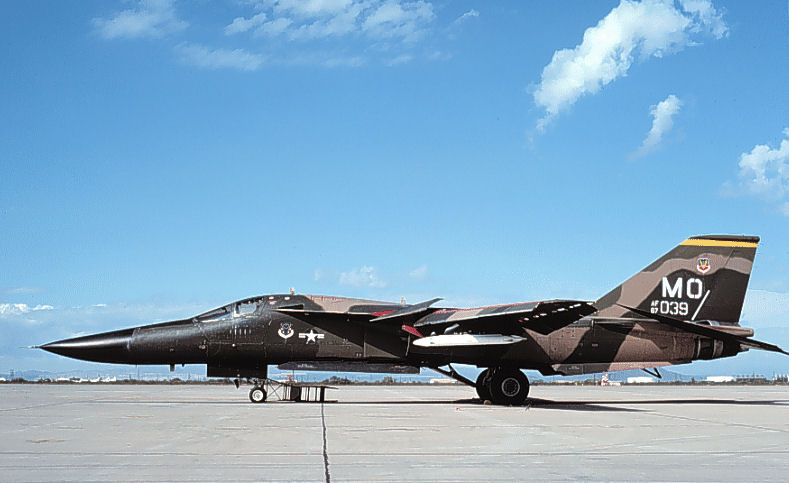
General Dynamics F-111A 67–0039. Sent to AMARC 19 June 1998

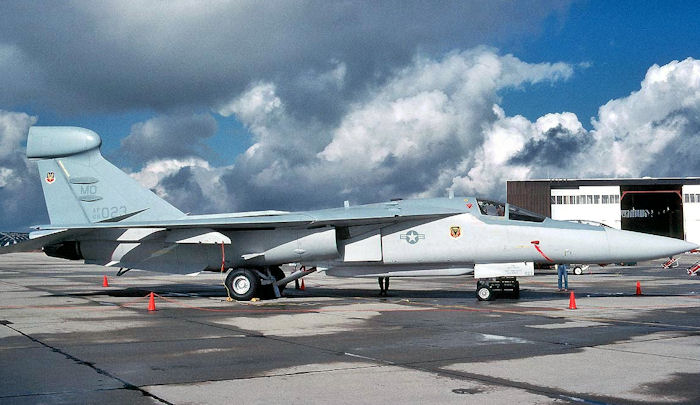
EF-111 68–0023. Sent to AMARC 13 October 1993

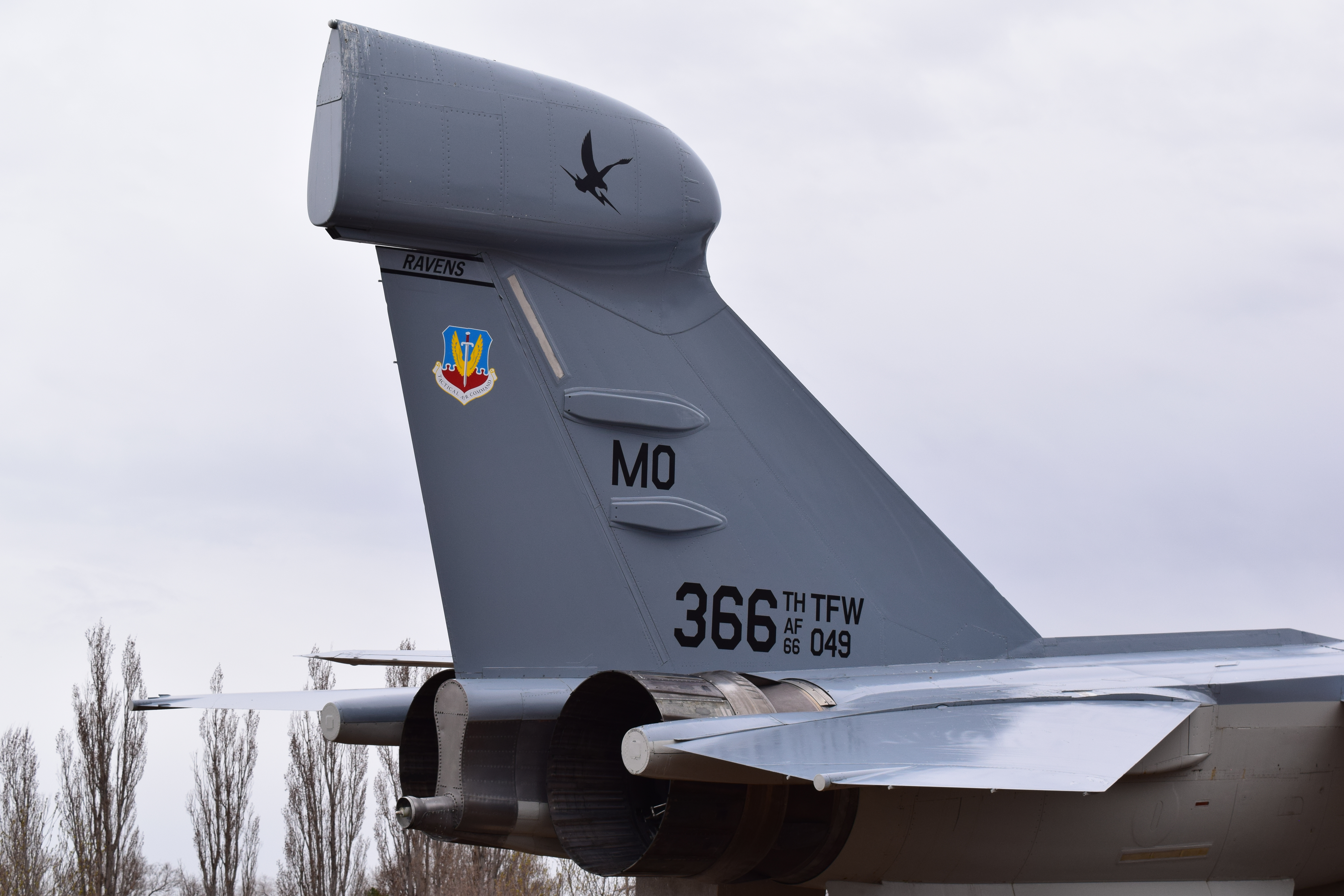
EF-111 formerly assigned to the wing on display at Mountain Home AFB

Relieved from combat assignment in Southeast Asia, the 366th was reassigned without personnel or equipment to the United States in October 1972 to replace the 347th Tactical Fighter Wing at Mountain Home AFB, Idaho. At Mountain Home, the wing was assigned the 389th, 390th, and 391st Tactical Fighter Squadrons which had returned from Vietnam, joined the 347th, and began converting to General Dynamics F-111F aircraft. For the first time since it left for Vietnam, the wing once again had its three original flying units.

Operations continued unchanged for several years. The wing tested its readiness in August 1976 when a border incident in South Korea prompted the United States to augment its military contingent in South Korea as a show of force. The 366th deployed a squadron of 20 F-111 fighters. They reached Korea only 31 hours after receiving launch notification. Tensions eased shortly afterward and the detachment returned home.

In 1977, the Air Force sent the F-111F aircraft from Mountain Home to the 48th Tactical Fighter Wing at RAF Lakenheath, England, in a move to modernize its European forces. In return, the 366th received F-111A aircraft from Nellis AFB, Nevada, where they equipped the 389th and 391st Squadrons.

In March 1980, the Air Force announced plans to base EF-111A Raven electronic combat aircraft at Mountain Home. The Raven variant was specifically design to blind enemy radars with powerful electronic signals. The 366th gradually sent part of its F-111A fleet to the Grumman Aerospace Corporation where they underwent extensive modification and were converted to the EF-111A configuration. In support of these changes, on 1 July 1981, Air Force activated the 388th Electronic Combat Squadron to receive the newly modified Ravens. However, a year later, Air Force redesignated the 390th Tactical Fighter Squadron as the 390th Electronic Combat Squadron, which replaced the 388th and began serving as the wing's only EF-111A squadron. Operations throughout the early 1980s remained stable with the 366th Tactical Fighter Wing training F-111A and EF-111A aircrews while maintaining combat readiness in both aircraft.

But as the F-111As were being retired, the wing's Ravens saw extensive service. In December 1989, the 366th deployed its EF-111As in support of Operation Just Cause in Panama. The 390th Electronic Combat Squadron contributed a small force of EF-111A aircraft to jam enemy radars during the brief invasion.

Likewise, in August 1990, most of the 390th ECS deployed to Saudi Arabia for Operation Desert Shield. The wing also deployed people to many different locations in the Middle East as forces were built up to defend against Iraqi aggression. The largest of the wing's contingents was the 390th ECS at King Fahad AB near Taif, Saudi Arabia. Here, the wing's EF-111A aircraft served with the 48th Tactical Fighter Wing (Provisional) which flew the F-111F.

In January 1991 coalition forces began Operation Desert Storm, initiating offensive operations against Iraqi forces. The deployed 390th flew electronic jamming missions during the six-week war, protecting coalition aircraft from Iraqi air defenses and contributing to the Allies' overwhelming control of the air. The deployed Ravens and most of the deployed Gunfighters returned to Mountain Home AFB in late March 1991.

=== 366th Wing ===
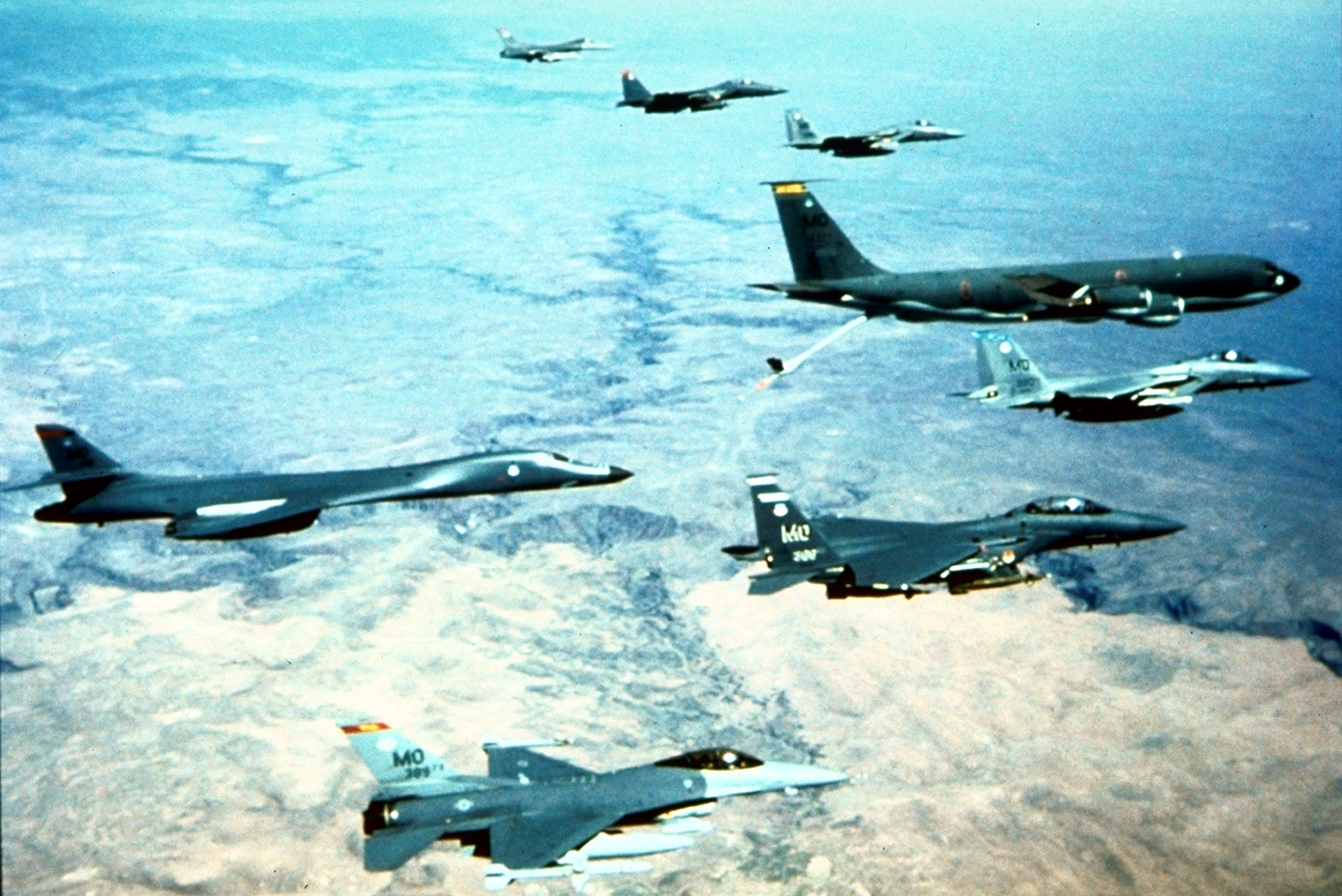
Composite air wing from Mountain Home AFB. F-15s, F-16s, KC-135, B-1B. Photo dated 1998

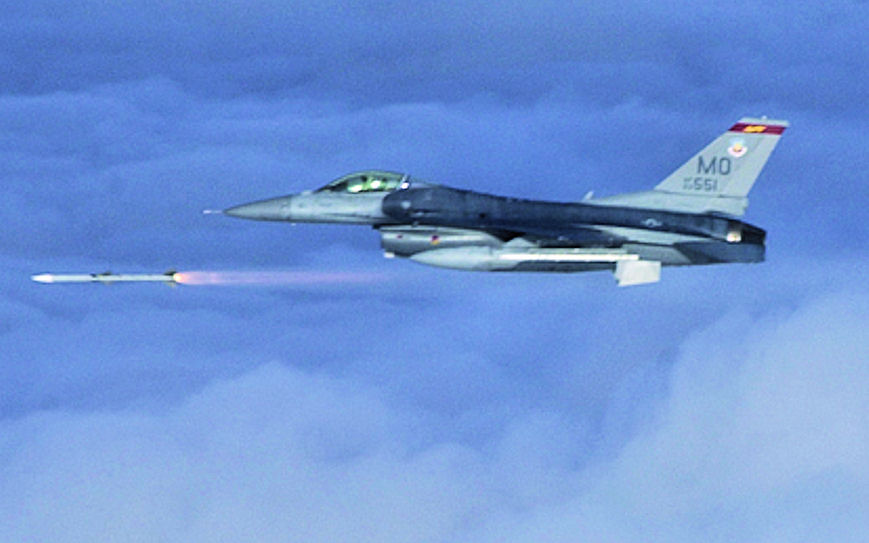
389th Fighter Squadron Lockheed F-16C Block 52Q Fighting Falcon 93-0551

The aging F-111A fleet was retired in the early 1990s, which prompted the inactivation of the 391st Tactical Fighter Squadron in June 1990 and of the 389th Tactical Fighter Training Squadron in June 1991, their aircraft being sent to the 27th TFW at Cannon AFB, New Mexico, the last USAF active duty F-111 equipped wing.

In early 1991, the Air Force announced that the 366th would become the Air Force's premier "air intervention" composite wing. The wing would grow from a single-squadron of EF-111As to a dynamic, five squadron wing with the ability to deploy rapidly and deliver integrated combat airpower. This resulted from General Merrill A. McPeak, then Chief of Staff of the Air Force (CSAF) and his belief that creating standing composite wings, wherein one commander would control all types of aircraft to defeat an enemy, would streamline and shorten tactical planning. General McPeak expressed that a composite wing would make "smaller mistakes because it works and trains together in peacetime...it knows the playbook...in other words, it can exploit the inherent flexibility of airpower."

The air intervention composite wing's rapid transition from concept to reality began in October 1991 when redesignated as the 366th Wing. The wing's newly activated "fighter squadrons" became part of the composite wing in March 1992. The 389th Fighter began flying the dual-role F-16C Fighting Falcon, while the 391st Fighter Squadron was equipped with the new F-15E Strike Eagle. These two squadrons provided the Gunfighters round-the-clock precision strike capability.

In June 1992, as part of Air Force restructuring, Strategic Air Command and Tactical Air Command merged to form Air Combat Command. A month later, the 366th also gained the 34th Bomb Squadron. Located at Castle AFB, California, the 34th flew the B-52G Stratofortress, giving the composite wing deep interdiction bombing capabilities as the only B-52 unit armed with the deadly, long-range HAVE NAP missile.

Next, in September 1992, Air Force redesignated the 390th Electronic Combat Squadron as the 390th Fighter Squadron, which began flying the Air Force's premier air superiority aircraft, the F-15C Eagle. With its internal 20-millimeter cannon and air-to-air missiles, the F-15C provided protection to the wing's high-value assets from enemy air threats. At the same time, Air Force activated the 429th Electronic Combat Squadron, which assumed control of the wing's EF-111A aircraft as they prepared to transfer to Cannon AFB, New Mexico.

During this buildup, however, the wing's Ravens remained busy flying combat missions over Iraq, both from Saudi Arabia in support of Operation Desert Calm, and from Incirlik AB, Turkey, in support of Operation Provide Comfort. In June 1993, however, the wing transferred its remaining EF-111As and the 429th ECS to Cannon AFB, ending Mountain Home's long association with the various models of the F-111 aircraft.

Not long afterward, in October 1993, the composite wing gained its final flying squadron when the 22nd Air Refueling Squadron was activated and equipped with the KC-135R Stratotankers. These tankers give the wing its ability to deploy globally at a moment's notice.

In summation, on 1 January 1994, the 366th Wing consisted of the following squadrons and aircraft:

- 22nd Air Refueling Squadron, KC-135R Stratotanker
- 34th Bomb Squadron, B-52G Stratofortress (At Castle AFB, California)
- 389th Fighter Squadron, F-16C Flying Falcon
- 390th Fighter Squadron, F-15C Eagle
- 391st Fighter Squadron. F-15E Strike Eagle

In another change, on 1 April 1994, the 34th Bomb Squadron transferred its flag to Ellsworth AFB, South Dakota. At the same time the squadron's B-52Gs were retired, making way for the squadron to be equipped with the technologically advanced Rockwell B-1B Lancer. Next, a gradual transfer of the B-1s from Ellsworth to Mountain Home began in August 1996. The squadron completed a move to Mountain Home on 1 April 1997, when its flag was officially transferred to the Gunfighter home base.

Also in 1996, the wing gained yet another operational squadron. On 21 June, the 726th Air Control Squadron was reassigned from Shaw AFB, South Carolina, to Mountain Home. The new squadron brought mobile radar surveillance, and command and control capabilities to the composite wing.

In late October 1996, the wing's senior leadership also announced a new name for the 366th Wing. Henceforth, it would be known as the "Air Expeditionary Wing" while deployed in keeping with an Air Force decision to stand up a "battle lab" at Mountain Home to refine the new concept. The wing would soon begin working out the most efficient procedures for moving an airpower expeditionary force to pre-selected locations around the world. The Air Expeditionary Force Battlelab (AEFB) activated by paper only on 1 April 1997, stood up at MHAFB on 22 October 1997.

While all these changes in the wing's composition were going on, the Gunfighters met numerous operational challenges. They have supported numerous deployments in the United States and around the world from the time of composite wing implementation. Only the highlights of this hectic pace are described here.

- Twice, in 1993 and again in 1995, the wing served as the lead unit for Exercise Bright Star, a large combined exercise held in Egypt.
- In July 1995, the wing also verified its combat capability in the largest operational readiness inspection in Air Force history. The Gunfighters deployed a composite strike force to CFB Cold Lake, Alberta, Canada, and proved they could deliver effective composite airpower.
- In 1996, the wing deployed to Incirlik AB, Turkey, for Operation Provide Comfort.
- The 366th deployed twice to Shaikh Isa AB, Bahrain, to support Operation Southern Watch in 1997 and 1998. These Air Expeditionary Force (AEF) deployments showed that the 366th Wing could employ and sustain its composite force while conducting the mission. Gunfighters returned on a second rotation relieving the unit who had replaced them after the wing's first visit to Bahrain. This historical first set the pace and made way for operational advancements.
- The 366th Wing then helped develop the way the Air Force will fly and fight in the 21st century through its participation as the lead AEF unit during Expeditionary Force Experiment 98. This CSAF experiment combined actual flights and combat simulations to create realistic warfighting environments. It aimed to rapidly mature initiatives that integrated air and space competency while applying decisive air and space power, thus dramatically improving command and control. The wing also participated in Operation Desert Thunder in 1998.

The 14 September 1998 announcement by CSAF Michael Ryan that the whole Air Force will reorganize into an 'Expeditionary Aerospace Force' came as no to surprise to the Gunfighters. Consequently, the 366th Wing ('Air Expeditionary Wing' (AEW), when deployed) led the way as the model from which other Air Expeditionary Wings were built after the September 11 terrorist attacks and the subsequent Operation Enduring Freedom and Operation Iraqi Freedom campaigns.

In early 1999, the wing's three fighter squadrons flew combat missions over southern Iraq, with the 391st dropping more bombs than any other unit since the end of Desert Storm. From April–June 1999, the 22 ARS supported Operation Allied Force, the NATO air campaign against Serbia. During this period, the squadron refueled 600 aircraft and off-loaded over 7 million pounds of fuel. The 726th Air Control Squadron also supported Kosovo operations from May–July 1999. They were the first American unit to deploy to Romania in 53 years. The team was led by the expertise of the radio maintenance shop.

In September 1999, the Gunfighters participated in JEFX 99, the latest in a series of exercises focused on testing emerging command and control technologies for deployed air expeditionary forces. Immediately following JEFX 99, the wing hosted Red Flag 00–1.1, the first red flag exercise in history not conducted at Nellis AFB, Nevada. Flown completely at night, the exercise combined traditional composite strike aircraft packages with low-observable F-117s and B-2 Spirit stealth aircraft in a simulated interdiction campaign.

Following the terrorist attacks on 11 September 2001 and the resultant United States invasion of Afghanistan, the 366th Wing once again got the call. While the 34th Bomb Squadron deployed to Diego Garcia as the B-1 component of the 28th Air Expeditionary Wing, the wing sent a Base Operations Support package to Al Udeid AB, Qatar to transform the bare base into a fully operational airfield for large-scale combat operations.

In October 2001, the 391st FS deployed to the Arabian Peninsula, while the 389th FS went to Al Udeid in November. Meanwhile, the 22 ARS, 390th FS, and 726th ACS supported Operation Noble Eagle protecting the skies of the Northwestern United States. The TDC Team displayed an exceptional performance at all levels in Support of Noble Eagle. In January 2007, the 391st FS deployed to Bagram Air Base, Afghanistan as the first F-15E Strike Eagle unit to patrol the skies over that country during Operation Enduring Freedom.

During the air campaign against Afghanistan that began on 7 October 2001, the 366th Wing's deployed crews flew nearly 1,000 sorties and dropped a total of 7.6 million pounds of bombs against Al Qaeda and Taliban targets—the most out of any unit participating in the operation.

=== 366th Fighter Wing ===
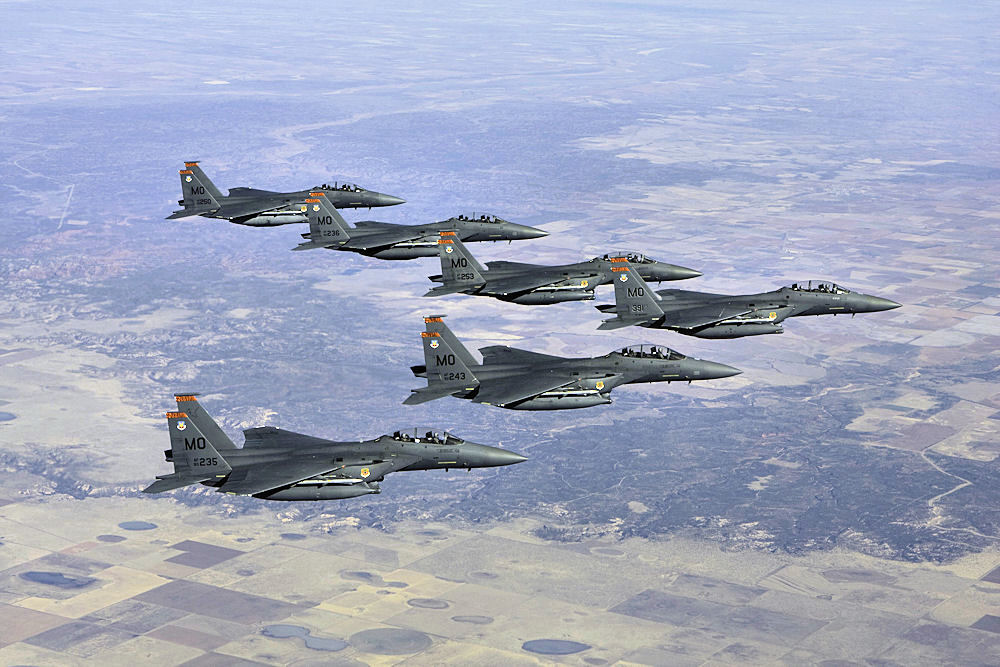
A formation of McDonnell Douglas F-15E-49-MC Strike Eagles of the 391st Fighter Squadron, 366th Fighter Wing

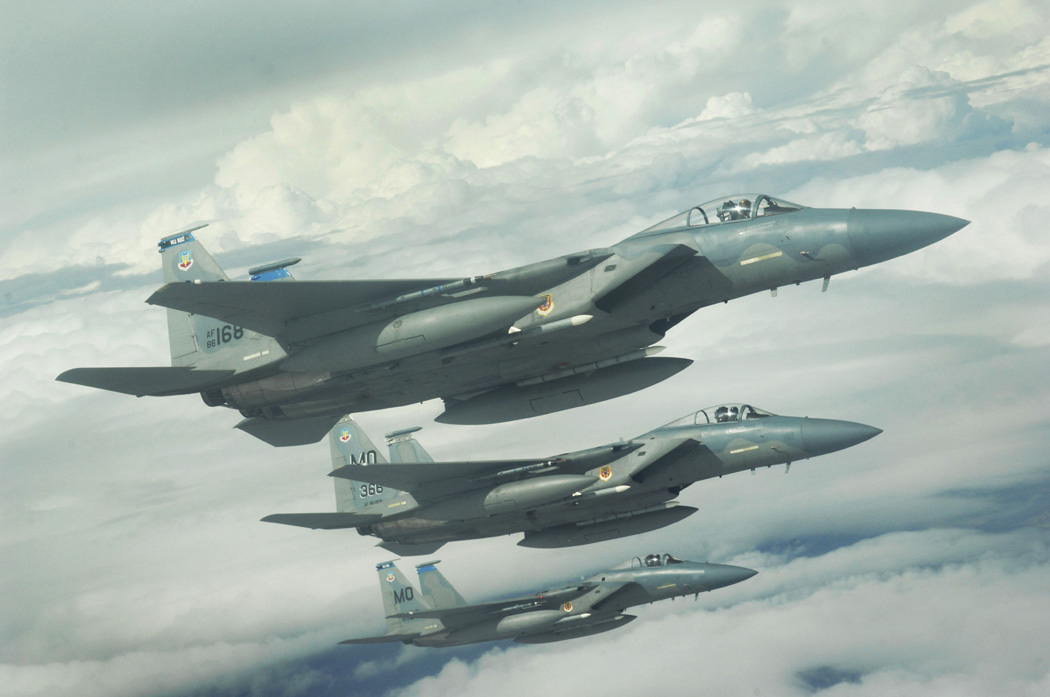
A 3-ship of McDonnell Douglas F-15C Eagles from the 390th Fighter Squadron, 366th Fighter Wing heads out on a Red Flag sortie on 24 July 2009.

Following the wing's return from Southwest Asia, consolidation of the Air Force's KC-135 and B-1 force led to the reallocation of the wing's bombers and tankers. While the 22d ARS aircraft transferred to McConnell AFB, Kansas in May 2002, the 34th BS B-1s went to Ellsworth AFB, South Dakota in June. As a result, the 22d ARS inactivated on 30 August 2002, while the 34th transferred to Ellsworth on 18 September.

On 30 September, the 366th Wing redesignated to the 366th Fighter Wing in conjunction with a significant change to its organizational structure. Under an Air Force-wide restructuring plan, the 366th Logistics Group redesignated as the 366th Maintenance Group and the 366th Support Group as the 366th Mission Support Group. Now, maintainers formerly assigned to their respective flying squadrons since the objective wing reorganization in 1992, belonged to the newly activated 366th Aircraft Maintenance Squadron under the maintenance group. Also within the maintenance group, the 366th Logistics Support Squadron redesignated as the 366th Maintenance Operations Squadron and the 366th Component Repair Squadron as the 366th Component Maintenance Squadron.

On the support side, the 366th Supply Squadron redesignated as the 366th Logistics Readiness Squadron on 18 July 2002, merging both the supply and transportation missions. On the same day, the 366th Transportation Squadron inactivated. Finally, the 366th Contracting Squadron moved from the 366th Logistics Group to the 366th Mission Support Group on 30 September. With these changes, the wing's 10-year mission as the Air Force's premiere air expeditionary wing came to an end, but did not affect its ability to meet any challenge the United States Air Force might face as it moves toward its vision of Global Engagement in the 21st Century.

In May 2005, the Base Realignment and Closure commission outlined recommendations to consolidate the 366th Fighter Wing from a multi-frame fighter base to a single frame of F-15E Strike Eagles. The move was part of the Air Force's efforts to consolidate its fighter fleets as a smarter way of doing business and to save money.

In November 2006, the 389th FS F-16CJs began to depart to McEntire Air National Guard Base, South Carolina, and Nellis Air Force Base, Nev., while new F-15Es arrived from Elmendorf Air Force Base, Alaska.

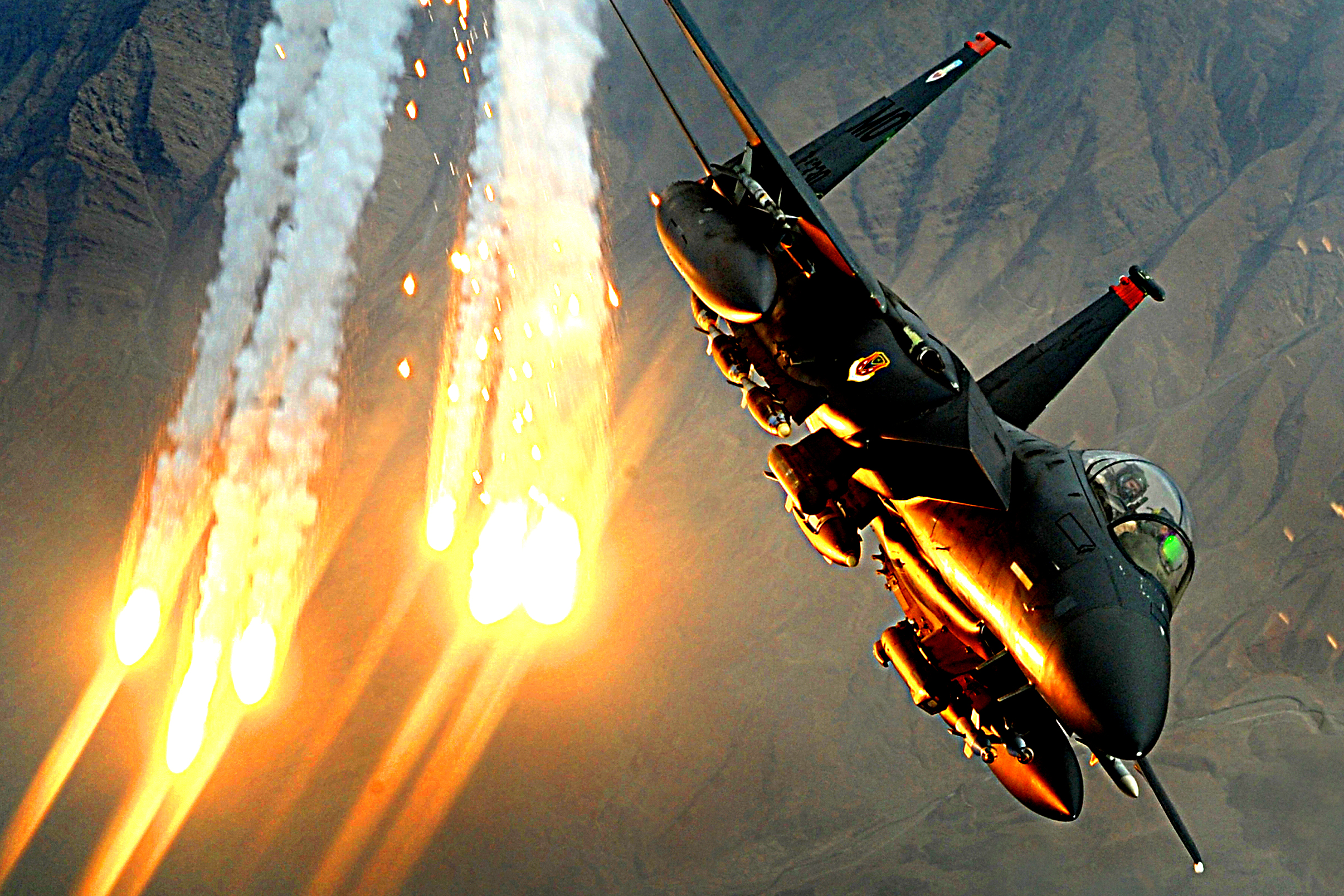
An F-15E Strike Eagle from the 391st Expeditionary Fighter Squadron of the 366th Fighter Wing at Bagram Air Base, Afghanistan, launches heat decoys during a close-air-support mission over Afghanistan, 15 December 2008.

The F-16CJs completely departed in March 2007, leaving the base with two F-15E Strike Eagle fighter squadrons and one F-15C Eagle fighter squadron. In September 2010, the F-15C squadron was redesignated as the 390th Electronic Combat Squadron and assumed the mission that the 388th ECS was doing, leaving the base and wing with only two F-15E squadrons.

=== Lineage ===
- Established as 366th Fighter-Bomber Wing on 15 November 1952

Activated on 1 January 1953
Redesignated 366th Tactical Fighter Wing on 1 July 1958
Inactivated on 1 April 1959

- Activated on 30 April 1962

Organized on 8 May 1962
Redesignated: 366th Wing on 1 October 1991
Redesignated: 366th Fighter Wing on 30 September 2002.

=== Assignments ===
- Ninth Air Force, 1 January 1953

Attached to Nineteenth Air Force, 15 February 1956 – 24 September 1957

- 834th Air Division, 25 September 1957 – 1 April 1959
- United States Air Forces in Europe, 30 April 1962
- Seventeenth Air Force, 8 May 1962
- Twelfth Air Force, 12 July 1963
- 832d Air Division, 1 October 1964
- 2d Air Division, 20 March 1966
- Seventh Air Force, 1 April 1966
- Thirteenth Air Force, 27 June 1972
- 832d Air Division, 31 October 1972
- Twelfth Air Force, 1 July 1975–August 2020
- Fifteenth Air Force, 20 August 2020-onwards

=== Components ===
Groups

- 366th Fighter-Bomber (later, 366th Operations): 1 January 1953 – 25 September 1957; 1 March 1992–present
- 401st Fighter-Bomber: attached 5 February 1954 – 25 September 1957

Squadrons

- 4th Tactical Fighter Squadron: 12 April 1969 – 31 October 1972 (detached 29–31 October 1972)
- 20th Tactical Air Support Squadron: 15 March – 27 June 1972
- 35th Tactical Fighter Squadron: attached 3 April – 12 June 1972
- 352d Tactical Fighter Squadron: 15 August – 10 October 1966
- 362d Tactical Electronic Warfare Squadron: 1 February – 27 June 1972
- 388th Tactical Fighter Training (later, 388th Electronic Combat) Squadron: 1 July 1977 – 30 September 1979; 1 July 1981 – 15 December 1982
- 389th Fighter-Bomber (later, 389th Tactical Fighter; 389th Tactical Fighter Training) Squadron: 25 September 1957 – 1 April 1959 (detached 25 September – 22 December 1957); 8 May 1962 – 15 June 1969 (detached 15 September – 16 December 1965); 31 October 1972 – 22 July 1991 (detached 16 September – 5 October 1976)
- 390th Fighter-Bomber (later, 390th Tactical Fighter; 390th Electronic Combat) Squadron: 25 September 1957 – 1 April 1959; 8 May 1962 – 29 October 1965; 10 October 1966 – 30 June 1972; 31 October 1972 – 1 October 1982 (detached 19 August – 16 September 1976); 15 December 1982 – 1 March 1992
- 391st Fighter-Bomber (later, 391st Tactical Fighter) Squadron: 25 September 1957 – 1 April 1959; 8 May 1962 – 26 January 1966; 31 October 1972 – 1 July 1990.
- 420 Air Refueling, Fighter-Bomber: attached 18 March 1954 – 22 September 1955
- 421st Tactical Fighter Squadron: 16 April 1969 – 31 May 1972 (detached 23 April – 25 June 1969)
- 480th Fighter-Bomber (later, 480th Tactical Fighter) Squadron: 25 September 1957 – 1 April 1959; 8 May 1962 – 1 February 1966; 10 October 1966 – 15 April 1969
- 614th Tactical Fighter Squadron: 18 September – 10 October 1966
- 615th Tactical Fighter Squadron: 16 July – 10 October 1966
- 622d Air Refueling Squadron: attached 18 July 1955 – 1 July 1958.

=== Stations ===
- Alexandria AFB (later, England AFB), Louisiana, 1 January 1953 – 1 April 1959
- Chaumont-Semoutiers Air Base, France, 8 May 1962 – 15 July 1963
- Holloman AFB, New Mexico, 15 July 1963 – 11 March 1966
- Phan Rang AB, South Vietnam, 20 March 1966
- Da Nang AB, South Vietnam, 10 October 1966
- Takhli RTAFB, Thailand, 27 June – 31 October 1972
- Mountain Home AFB, Idaho, 31 October 1972–present

=== Aircraft ===
- F-51 Mustang, 1953
- F-86 Sabre, 1953–1955, 1956
- F-84 Thunderjet, 1954–1958
- KB-29 Superfortress, 1954–1957
- KB-50 Superfortress, 1957–1958
- F-100 Super Sabre, 1957–1959
- F-84 Thunderjet, 1962–1965
- F-100 Super Sabre, 1963, 1966
- F-4 Phantom II, 1965–1972
- EC-47 Skytrain, 1972
- O-2 Skymaster, 1972
- OV-10 Bronco, 1972
- General Dynamics F-111F, 1972–1977
- General Dynamics F-111A, 1977–1991
- EF-111A Raven, 1981–1993
- F-15A/B Eagle, 1991–1993
- B-1 Lancer, 1996–2002
- F-16 Falcon, 1991–2007
- F-15C & D Eagle, 1992–2010
- F-15E Strike Eagle, 1992 – present

== See also ==
- List of B-52 Units of the United States Air Force
