= 390th Electronic Combat Squadron =

390th Electronic Combat Squadron

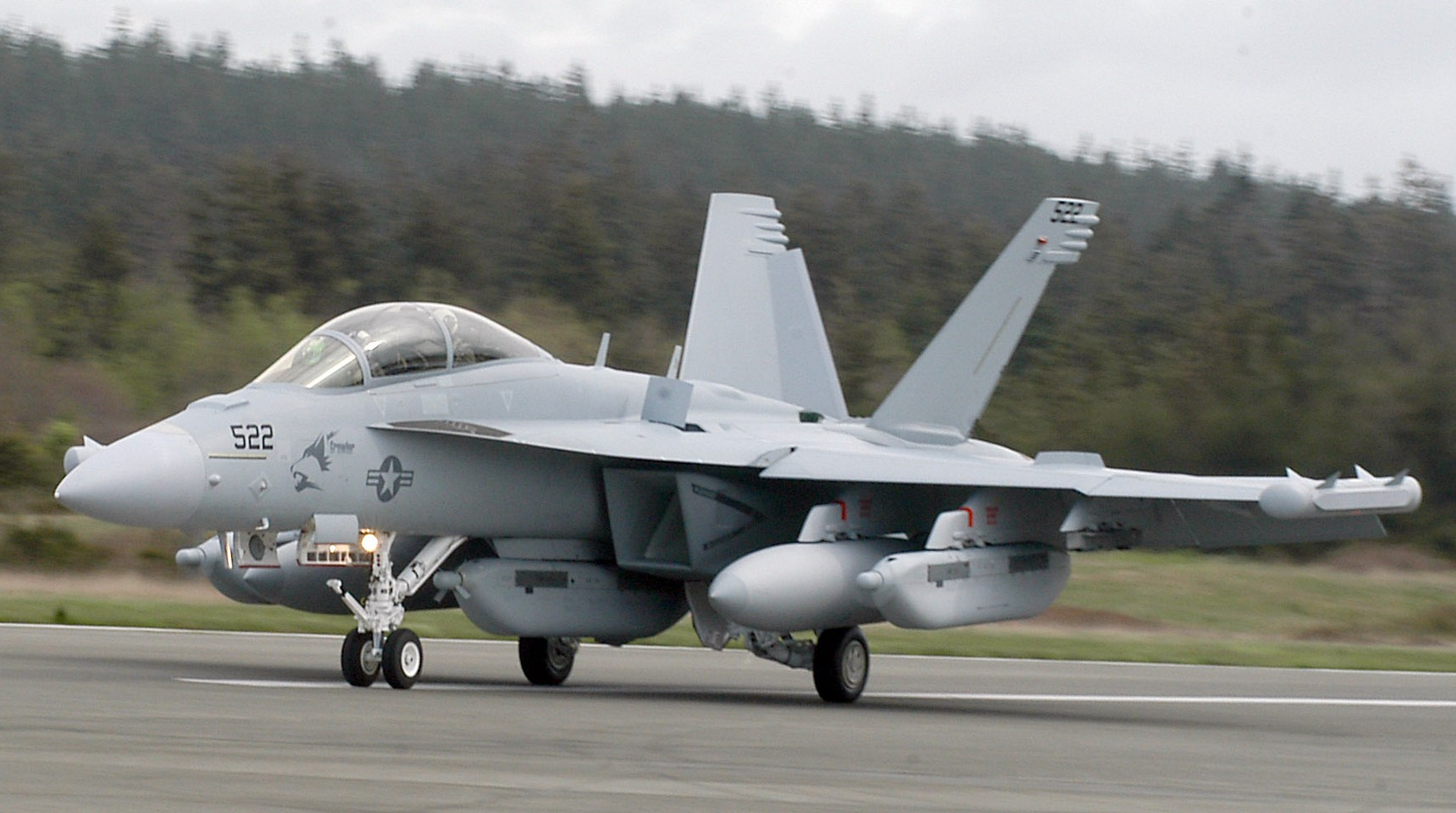
- EA-18G Growler at NAS Whidbey Island
- Active: 1943–1946; 1953–1959; 1962–1982; 1982–present
- Country: United States
- Branch: United States Air Force
- Role: Electronic Combat
- Part of: Air Combat Command: Fifteenth Air Force; 366th Fighter Wing; 366th Operations Group
- Garrison/HQ: Naval Air Station Whidbey Island, Washington
- Nicknames: Wild Boars; Blue Boar (Vietnam)
- Engagements: World War II – EAME Theater Vietnam War Armed Forces Expeditionary: Panama, 1989–1990; Gulf War (Southwest Asia)

- Decorations: Distinguished Unit Citation; Presidential Unit Citation Air Force Meritorious Unit Award Air Force Outstanding Unit Award with Combat "V" device Air Force Outstanding Unit Award Republic of Vietnam Gallantry Cross with Palm; Belgian Fourragère

Commanders
- Current commander: Lt Col Jesse Vanasse
- Notable commanders: Lt. Col. Harold E. Comstock (later Colonel); 8 Sep 1954; Lt. Col. Hoyt S. Vandenberg Jr. (later Maj. Gen.); 6 January 1967; Lt. Col. Larry D. New (later Maj. Gen.); 17 Jun 1992; Lt. Col. Frank Gorenc (later General); 22 Jan 1996

Insignia
- 390th Fighter Squadron emblem (modified 18 November 1993)

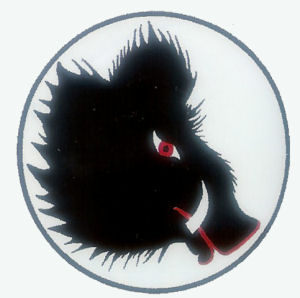
- 390th Fighter-Bomber Squadron emblem (approved 6 October 1955)

The 390th Electronic Combat Squadron (390 ECS) is a United States Air Force unit. It is assigned to the 366th Fighter Wing at Mountain Home Air Force Base, Idaho and stationed at Naval Air Station Whidbey Island, Washington.

The 390th was constituted on 24 May 1943 as the 390th Fighter Squadron and assigned to the 366th Fighter Group. On 17 December 1943 the unit was moved to Membury England and began combat operations in the European Theater. Since this time the unit has flown over ten different aircraft including the F-51, F-86, F-4, F-111 and the F-15. In the late 90s the USAF retired its aging fleet of EF-111A's leaving the Air Force without a dedicated EA platform. While the Air Force's EA platform may have disappeared the need for electronic attack has not. Due to this fact, in 1995, the Office of the Secretary of Defense arranged an agreement with the Navy embedding USAF electronic warfare airmen in Navy EA-6B and now EA-18G squadrons. Currently, The 390th provides logistical expertise and personnel to operate the EA-18G Growler in support of the Joint Airborne Electronic Attack Program.

== Mission ==
390 ECS's mission is to man and deploy the Expeditionary EA-18G Growler squadrons in accordance with the Joint Airborne Electronic Attack program.

== History ==
=== World War II ===
The 390th flew combat missions in the European Theater of Operations from 14 March 1944 – 3 May 1945.

On 12 April 1944, the squadron's P-47s flew its first escort job of the month and one of the deepest penetrations in its brief operational history. The VIII Air Force bombers went out in force to strike at repair depots and aircraft factories in Germany and Poland. The squadron took the big friendly into the vicinity of Kobelnz. The mission was uneventful. Three new replacements arrived on this day in the persons of Lieutenants William A.Hurd, Henry G. Hyde, and Robert B. Jones.

=== Vietnam ===
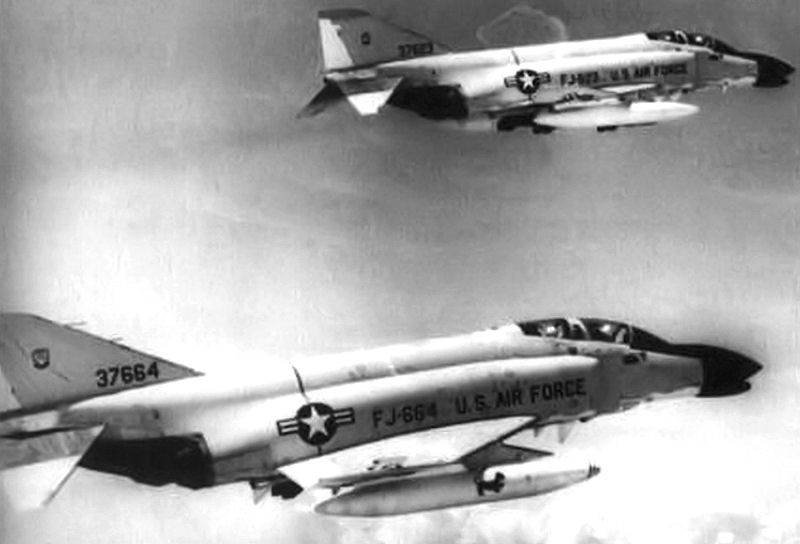
390th Tactical Fighter Squadron F-4Cs flying over Vietnam, late 1965.

The 390th flew combat missions in Southeast Asia from, c. 18 November 1965 – 14 June 1972.

=== Electronic Warfare ===
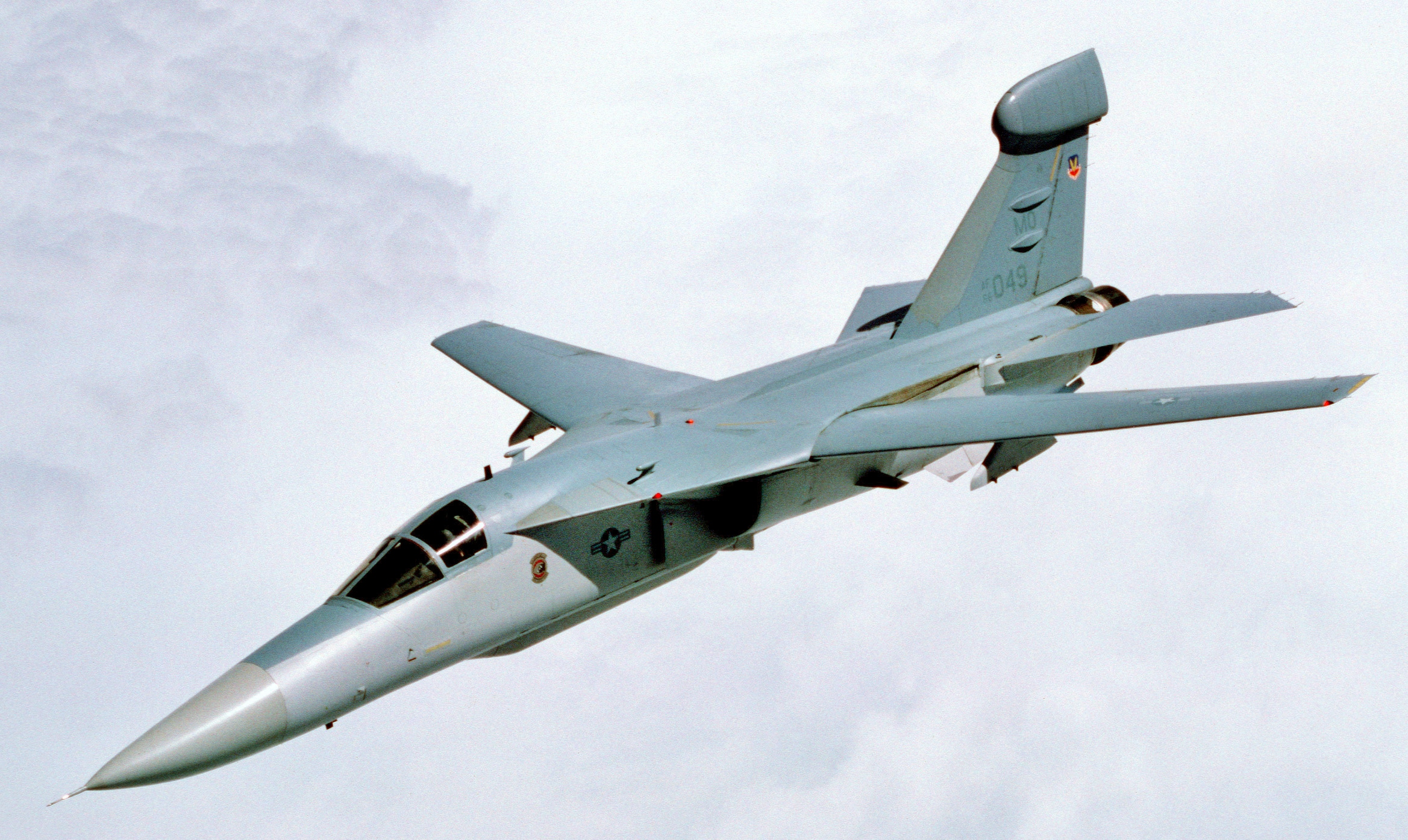
EF-111A Raven in flight

The squadron conducted replacement training from, 1 July 1974 – c. 18 August 1976. It trained EF-111A Raven aircrews in electronic countermeasures from, 15 December 1982 – 4 August 1992. The 390th again saw combat when it jammed radar sites during the invasion of Panama in December 1989, and the Gulf War from, 17 January 1991 – 6 March 1991. The 390 FS also deployed aircraft and aircrews to Turkey and Saudi Arabia from, 10 January–c. 11 September 1992.

It was redesignated the 390th Electronic Combat Squadron again on 27 September 2010. The squadron was located at Naval Air Station Whidbey Island, Washington and flew EA-6B Prowlers alongside VAQ-129. The last flight of the unit in the Prowler took place on 9 July 2014 as the squadron transitioned to the EA-18G Growler.

On May 17th 2026, 2 EA-18G Growlers from the Squadron crashed into each other midair during the Gunfighters Skies Air Show hosted at Mountain Home Air Force Base in Idaho. All 4 crew members ejected safety from both planes and landed in stable condition on the ground with both planes impacting the ground and exploding, causing a bush fire.

=== Operations ===
- World War II
- Vietnam War
- Operation Just Cause
- Operation Desert Storm

== Lineage ==
- Constituted as the 390th Fighter Squadron (Single Engine) on 24 May 1943

Activated on 1 June 1943
Redesignated 390th Fighter Squadron, Single Engine on 20 August 1943
Inactivated on 20 August 1945

- Redesignated 390th Fighter-Bomber Squadron on 15 November 1952

Activated 1 January 1953

- Redesignated 390th Tactical Fighter Squadron on 1 July 1958

Inactivated on 1 April 1959
Activated on 30 April 1962 (not organized)
Organized on 8 May 1962
Inactivated on 1 October 1982

- Redesignated 390th Electronic Combat Squadron on 10 December 1982

Activated on 15 December 1982

- Redesignated 390th Fighter Squadron on 11 September 1992
- Redesignated 390th Electronic Combat Squadron on 27 September 2010

=== Assignments ===
- 366th Fighter Group: 1 June 1943 – 20 August 1946
- 366th Fighter-Bomber Group: 1 January 1953 (attached to 21st Fighter-Bomber Wing 25 December 1955 – c. 14 June 1956)
- 366th Fighter-Bomber Wing (later 366th Tactical Fighter Wing): 25 September 1957 – 1 April 1959
- United States Air Forces in Europe: 30 April 1962 (not organized)
- 366th Tactical Fighter Wing: 8 May 1962
- 6252d Tactical Fighter Wing: 29 October 1965
- 35th Tactical Fighter Wing: 8 April 1966
- 366th Tactical Fighter Wing: 10 October 1966
- 347th Tactical Fighter Wing: 30 June 1972
- 366th Tactical Fighter Wing (later 366th Fighter Wing: 31 October 1972 – 1 October 1982 (attached Detachment 1, Hq, 366th Tactical Fighter Wing 19 August 1976 – 16 September 1976)
- 366th Fighter Wing: 15 December 1982 – present)

=== Stations ===
- Richmond Army Air Base, Virginia, 1 June 1943
- Bluethenthal Field, North Carolina, 9 August 1943
- Richmond Army Air Base, Virginia, 6 November 1943 – 17 December 1943
- RAF Membury, England, 10 January 1944
- RAF Thruxton, England, 1 March 1944
- Saint-Pierre-du-Mont Airfield, France, 20 June 1944
- Dreux - Vernouillet Airport, France, 25 August 1944
- Laon-Couvron Air Base, France, 8 September 1944
- Asch Airfield, Belgium, 26 November 1944
- Münster-Handorf Airfield, Germany, 14 April 1945
- Bayreuth-Bindlach Airfield, Germany, 28 June 1945
- Fritzlar Air Base, Germany, 14 September 1945 – 20 August 1946
- England Air Force Base, Louisiana, 1 January 1953 – 1 April 1959

Deployed to Aviano Air Base, Italy, 25 December 1955 – c. 14 June 1956

- Chambley-Bussieres Air Base, France, 30 April 1962
- Holloman Air Force Base, New Mexico, 12 June 1963
- Da Nang Air Base, South Vietnam, 29 October 1965 (deployed to Clark Air Base, Philippines until c. 17 November 1965)
- Mountain Home Air Force Base, Idaho, 30 June 1972 – 1 October 1982
- Mountain Home Air Force Base, Idaho, 15 December 1982

Deployed to Taegu Air Base, South Korea 19 August – 16 September 1976, NAS Keflavik, Iceland 19 January 2006 – 20 April 2006

- Naval Air Station Whidbey Island, Washington, 27 September 2010 – present

=== Aircraft ===
- P-47 Thunderbolt (1943–1946)
- P-51 Mustang (1953)
- F-86 Sabre (1953–1955)
- F-84 Thunderjet (1954–1958, 1962–1965)
- F-100 Super Sabre (1957–1959)
- F-4 Phantom II (1965–1972)
- F-111F model then F-111A model Aardvark (1972–1982)
- EF-111A Raven (1982–1992)
- F-15C/D Eagle (1992–2010)
- EA-6B Prowler (2010–2014)
- EA-18G Growler (2011–present)

=== Campaign streamers ===
World War II:

- Air Offensive, Europe
- Normandy
- Northern France
- Rhineland
- Ardennes-Alsace
- Central Europe
- Air Combat, EAME Theater

Vietnam:

- Vietnam Defensive
- Vietnam Air
- Vietnam Air Offensive
- Vietnam Air Offensive, Phase II
- Vietnam Air Offensive, Phase III
- Vietnam Air/Ground
- Vietnam Air Offensive, Phase IV
- TET 69/Counteroffensive
- Vietnam Summer-Fall, 1969
- Vietnam Winter-Spring, 1970
- Sanctuary Counteroffensive
- Southwest Monsoon
- Commando Hunt V
- Commando Hunt VI
- Commando Hunt VII
- Vietnam Ceasefire

Southwest Asia:

- Defense of Saudi Arabia
- Liberation and Defense of Kuwait
- Ceasefire

Armed Forces Expeditionary Streamers:

- Panama, 1989–1990.

=== Decorations ===
Distinguished Unit Citation:

1. Normandy, 11 July 1944

Presidential Unit Citations (Southeast Asia):

1. 23 Apr–1 Aug 1967
2. 1 Apr–26 Jun 1972

Air Force Outstanding Unit Awards with Combat "V" Device:

1. 1 May 1966 – 31 Mar 1967
2. 1 Apr 1967 – 31 Mar 1968
3. 1 Apr 1968 – 31 Jul 1969
4. 1 Aug 1969 – 1 Aug 1970
5. 2 Aug 1970 – 31 Mar 1972

Meritorious Unit Award:

1. 1 Jan 2007 – 31 May 2008.

Air Force Outstanding Unit Awards:

1. 1 May 1964 – 30 Apr 1966;
2. 17 Apr 1974 – 15 Apr 1976;
3. 16 Apr 1976 – 27 Mar 1978;
4. 18 Aug–16 Sep 1976;
5. 1 Apr 1983 – 31 Mar 1985;
6. 1 Mar 1989 – 28 Feb 1991;
7. 1 Mar 1992 – 28 Feb 1994;
8. 1 Jun 1996 – 31 May 1998;
9. 1 Jun 1999 – 31 May 2001;
10. 1 Jun 2001 – 31 May 2002;
11. 1 Jun 2003 – 31 May 2005;
12. 1 Jun 2005 – 31 May 2006;
13. 1 Jun 2011 – 31 May 2012.

Cited in the Orders of the Day, Belgian Army:

1. 6 Jun–30 Sep 1944;
2. 1 Oct–17 Dec 1944;
3. 18 Dec 1944 – 25 Jan 1945.

Belgian Fourragere. Republic of Vietnam Gallantry Cross with Palm:

1. 1 May 1966 – 30 Jun 1972.

=== Previous commanders ===
- Capt Harold N. Holt, 1 June 1943
- Capt Clure E. Smith, 14 May 1944
- Capt Maurice L. Martin, 2 October 1944
- Capt Lowell B. Smith, 1 Feb – c. 20 Apr 1945
- unknown, 21 Apr 1945 – 20 Aug 1946
- Maj John W. Saxton, c. 1 Jan 1953-unknown
- Lt Col Harold E. Comstock, c. Jun 1954-unknown
- Maj Joseph S. Michalowski, unknown – 14 Aug 1957
- Maj Fred H. Henderson, 14 August 1957
- Lt Col Frank J. McGuinness, 9 Sep 1958 – 1 Apr 1959
- unknown, 8 May – 15 Jul 1962
- Lt Col Raymond L. Hurley, 16 July 1962
- Lt Col Jack Bellamy, 29 June 1964
- Lt Col Douglas H. Frost, Jul 1966
- Lt Col Hoyt S. Vandenberg Jr., 6 January 1967
- Lt Col Hervey S. Stockman, 19 May 1967
- Lt Col Clement D. Billingslea, 11 June 1967
- Lt Col Fred A. Haeffner, 20 June 1967
- Lt Col Wayne T. Elder, 23 November 1967
- Lt Col John S. Stoer, 19 May 1968
- Lt Col Cecil G. Foster, 29 July 1968
- Lt Col Robert S. McCormick, 7 June 1969
- Lt Col Garold R. Beck, 19 June 1969
- Lt Col John E. Cadou, 27 March 1970
- Lt Col Robert B. Watson, 8 December 1970
- Lt Col Delbert H. Jacobs, 22 April 1971
- Lt Col Walter E. Bjorneby, 18 December 1971
- Lt Col Gene E. Taft, 6 May-c. 14 June 1972
- none (not manned), 15–29 Jun 1972
- Lt Col Robert B. Coburn, 30 June 1972
- Lt Col Ronald G. Strack, 18 June 1973
- Lt Col David H. Reiner, 13 December 1974
- Lt Col John A. Dramesi, 1 May 1975
- Lt Col James C. Sharp, 12 April 1976
- Lt Col Brian R. Williams, 16 May 1977
- Lt Col Joe G. Cabuk Jr., 10 May 1979
- Lt Col Samuel L. Harris, 9 Jan 1981 – 1 Oct 1982
- Lt Col Herbert T. Pickering Jr., 15 December 1982
- Lt Col Robert J. Osterloh, 24 June 1983
- Lt Col William R. Teske, 7 June 1985
- Lt Col Richard M. Meeboer, 22 June 1987
- Lt Col Dennis Hardziej, 1 June 1989
- Lt Col Kenneth J. Muldowney, 7 June 1991
- Lt Col Larry D. New, 17 June 1992
- Lt Col Peter J. Bunce, 24 March 1994
- Lt Col Frank Gorenc, 22 January 1996
- Lt Col Mitch R. Fryt, 25 July 1997
- Lt Col Eric M. O’Connell, 16 July 1999
- Lt Col James P. Molloy, 9 March 2001
- Lt Col David A. Slade, 7 March 2003
- Lt Col Jeffrey W. Prichard, 25 March 2005
- Lt Col David L. Cool, 20 November 2006
- Lt Col James E. Stratton, 25 October 2008
- Lt Col Donald K. McFatridge, 27 September 2010
- Lt Col Karl Fischbach, May 2011
- Lt Col Don Keen, May 2013
- Lt Col Allen A. Geist, 20 May 2015
- Lt Col Jeffery S. Kassebaum, May 2017
- Lt Col David C. Davidson, June 2019
- Lt Col John L. Henderson, June 2021
