= 481 =

Calendar year

481 in various calendars
Gregorian calendar	481; CDLXXXI
Ab urbe condita	1234
Assyrian calendar	5231
Balinese saka calendar	402–403
Bengali calendar	−113 – −112
Berber calendar	1431
Buddhist calendar	1025
Burmese calendar	−157
Byzantine calendar	5989–5990
Chinese calendar	庚申年 (Metal Monkey); 3178 or 2971 — to — 辛酉年 (Metal Rooster); 3179 or 2972
Coptic calendar	197–198
Discordian calendar	1647
Ethiopian calendar	473–474
Hebrew calendar	4241–4242
- Hindu calendars
Vikram Samvat	537–538
Shaka Samvat	402–403
Kali Yuga	3581–3582
Holocene calendar	10481
Iranian calendar	141 BP – 140 BP
Islamic calendar	145 BH – 144 BH
Javanese calendar	367–368
Julian calendar	481; CDLXXXI
Korean calendar	2814
Minguo calendar	1431 before ROC 民前1431年
Nanakshahi calendar	−987
Seleucid era	792/793 AG
Thai solar calendar	1023–1024
Tibetan calendar	ལྕགས་ཕོ་སྤྲེ་ལོ་ (male Iron-Monkey); 607 or 226 or −546 — to — ལྕགས་མོ་བྱ་ལོ་ (female Iron-Bird); 608 or 227 or −545

The Frankish Empire (481–814)

Year 481 (CDLXXXI) was a common year starting on Thursday of the Julian calendar. At the time, it was known as the Year of the Consulship of Maecius without colleague (or, less frequently, year 1234 Ab urbe condita). The denomination 481 for this year has been used since the early medieval period, when the Anno Domini calendar era became the prevalent method in Europe for naming years.

== Events ==
=== By place ===
==== Europe ====
- King Childeric I dies at Tournai after a 24-year reign. He is succeeded by his 15-year-old son Clovis, who becomes ruler of the Salian Franks in the province Gallia Belgica (modern Belgium) until his death in 511.
- Theodoric Strabo defeats the Bulgars in Thrace, and moves with an army (13,000 men) towards Constantinople. After logistical problems, he is forced to return to Greece. In an encampment at Stabulum Diomedis, near Philippi, he falls from an unruly horse onto a spear and dies.

==== Persia ====
- The Armenians revolt against Persian rule, in an uprising that continues until 484. Led by Vahan Mamikonian, nephew of the late Vartan, they obtain religious and political freedom in return for military aid. Vahan is installed as governor (marzban).

==== Asia ====
- Jangsu of Goguryeo invades Silla with the Mohe. Baekje and Gaya come to Silla's aid and defeats the Goguryeo troops.

== Deaths ==
- Childeric I, king of the Salian Franks (or 482)
- Sabinianus Magnus, Roman general
- Theodoric Strabo, Ostrogothic chieftain
- Timothy III, patriarch of Alexandria
