= Exercise Delawar =

1964 US/Iranian military exercise

- Part of the Cold War
- Type: Military exercise
- Locations: Iran; Persian Gulf
- Planned by: Central Treaty Organization (CENTO)
- Date: 12–15 April 1964
- Executed by: Imperial Iranian Armed Forces; United States Armed Forces

Exercise Delawar (Persian: دلاور, lit. 'Courageous') was a joint military exercise in 1964 conducted by the United States and Iran under the auspices of the Central Treaty Organization (CENTO). It took place in southwest Iran.

Some 6,800 American military personnel from three military branches took part in this war game, including 2,300 paratroopers. U.S. naval forces, as well as Marines were also deployed in the Persian Gulf and performed amphibious operations, supported by close-air-support of F-100s.

According to Čūbīn and Zabih, by this war game, Washington "partially reassured" Tehran of its continued interest in the region.
