= Mountain Home High School =

Mountain Home High School may refer to:

- Mountain Home High School, Mountain Home, Arkansas
- Mountain Home High School, Mountain Home, Idaho
