= Tonopah Bombing Range =

Tonopah Bombing Range was the original southern Nevada military area designated in 1940 (cf. the current Nevada Test and Training Range) and may refer to:

- Tonopah General Range, the smaller 1941 area designated when the "Tonopah Gunnery and Bombing Range" was divided (cf. Las Vegas General Area)
  - Tonopah Army Air Field, the range's main base first manned by the 1942 "Bombing and Gunnery Range Detachment"
- Tonopah Bombing and Gunnery Range, the 1947 designation prior to the 1949 merger of the 2 areas (cf. Las Vegas Bombing and Gunnery Range)
  - Tonopah Air Force Base, the name of the range's main base after c. 1947 transfer to the USAF
- Tonopah Test Range, a 1956 area established for nuclear testing (cf. the "instrumented AEC range at Tonopah" used by the Navy in 1957.)
- Tonopah Bombing Range (FUDS), the area of the former AFB and the portion of the 1940 range that are outside of the current range
