= 470th Bombardment Group =

470th Bombardment Group (later 470th Electronic Warfare Group)
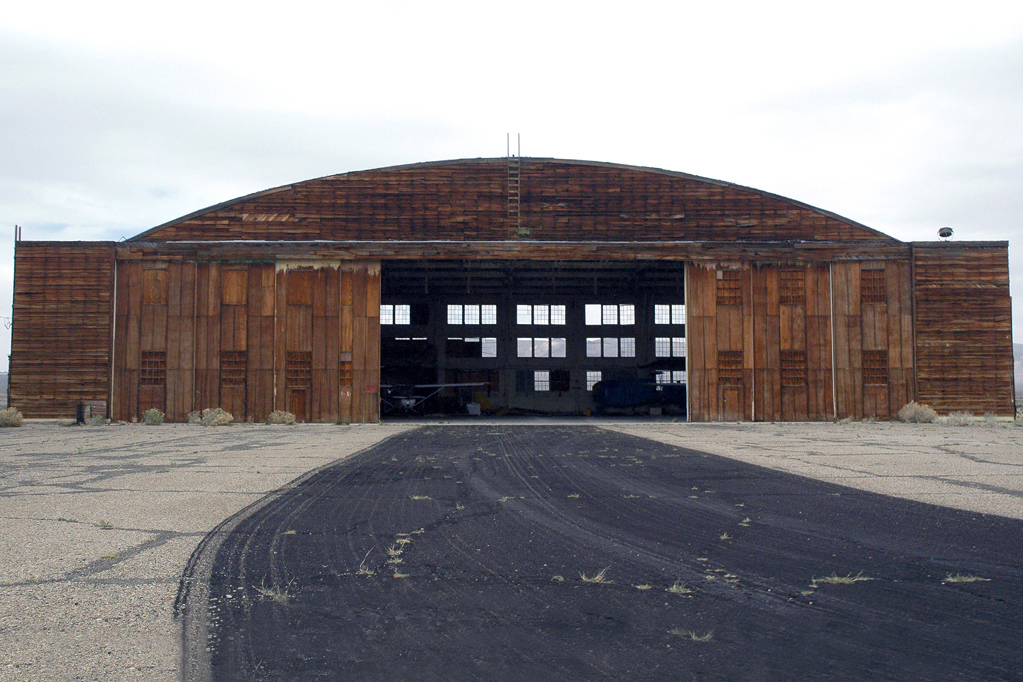
- Former hangar for heavy bombers at Tonopah Army Air Field in 2011
- Active: 1943–1944
- Country: United States
- Branch: United States Air Force
- Role: Aircrew Training

The 470th Electronic Warfare Group is an inactive United States Air Force unit. It was last active as a crew training unit during World War II as the 470th Bombardment Group at Tonopah Army Air Field, Nevada, where it was disbanded on 31 March 1944. In 1985, the group was redesignated as an electronic warfare unit, but has not been active since then.

== History ==
The 470th was first activated by Second Air Force at Mountain Home Army Air Field, Idaho in May 1943 to serve as a heavy bomber training unit. (Note: It is unclear what type of aircraft the group used for training. In Air Force Combat Units of World War II, Maurer states the group was a Consolidated B-24 Liberator training unit. Maurer, Combat Units, pp. 344–345. However, in Combat Squadrons of the Air Force, World War II, he indicates that each of the group's four squadrons was equipped with Boeing B-17 Flying Fortresses. Maurer, Combat Squadrons, pp. 761–762.) The group's operational squadrons were the 800th, 801st, 802d, and 803d Bombardment Squadrons. The group initially acted as an Operational Training Unit (OTU). The OTU program involved the use of an oversized parent unit to provide cadres to "satellite groups".

In January 1944, the group moved to Tonopah Army Air Field, Nevada in echelons with the 802d Squadron leading the way on 3 January 1944, followed by the 803d Squadron on 4 January, the 801st Squadron on 5 January, and group headquarters and the 800th Squadron completing the group's move on 6 January. The move to Tonopah also marked a transfer to Fourth Air Force, and a mission change to become a Replacement Training Unit (RTU). RTUs were oversized units like OTUs, but their mission was to train individual pilots or aircrews. However, the Army Air Forces found that standard military units like the 470th, based on relatively inflexible tables of organization were not well adapted to the training mission. Accordingly it adopted a more functional system in which each base was organized into a separate numbered unit. The 470th Group and its four squadrons were disbanded on 31 March 1944, and along with support units at Tonopah, replaced by the 422 AAF Base Unit (Bombardment Replacement Training Unit – Heavy).

== Lineage ==
- Constituted as the 470th Bombardment Group (Heavy) on 22 April 1943

Activated on 1 May 1943
Disbanded on 31 March 1944

- Reconstituted on 31 July 1985 as the 470th Electronic Warfare Group (not active)

=== Assignments ===
- II Bomber Command, 1 May 1943
- Second Air Force, 6 October 1943
- IV Bomber Command, 6 January-31 March 1944

=== Components ===
- 800th Bombardment Squadron: 1 May 1943 – 31 March 1944
- 801st Bombardment Squadron: 1 May 1943 – 31 March 1944
- 802d Bombardment Squadron: 1 May 1943 – 31 March 1944
- 803d Bombardment Squadron: 1 May 1943 – 31 March 1944

=== Stations ===
- Mountain Home Army Air Field, Idaho, 1 May 1943
- Tonopah Army Air Field, Nevada, 6 January–31 March 1944
