= 366th Operations Group =

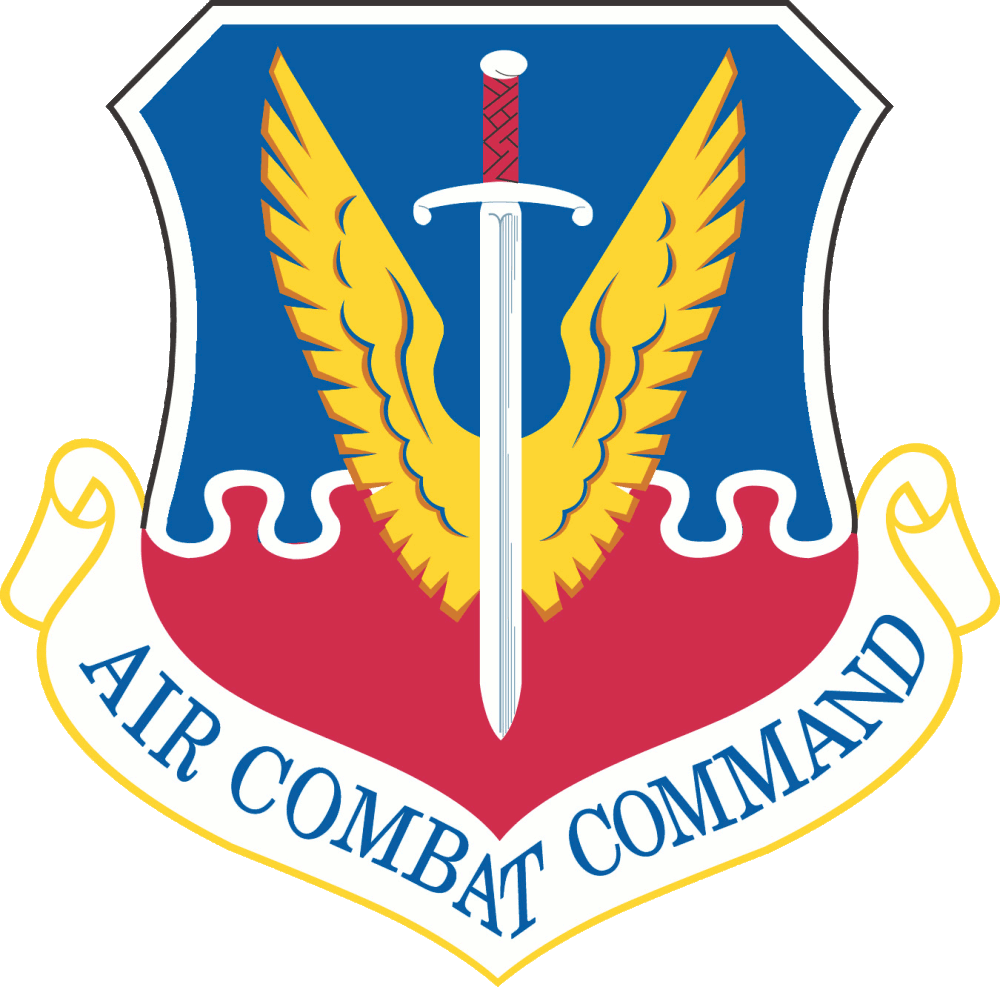
366th Operations Group

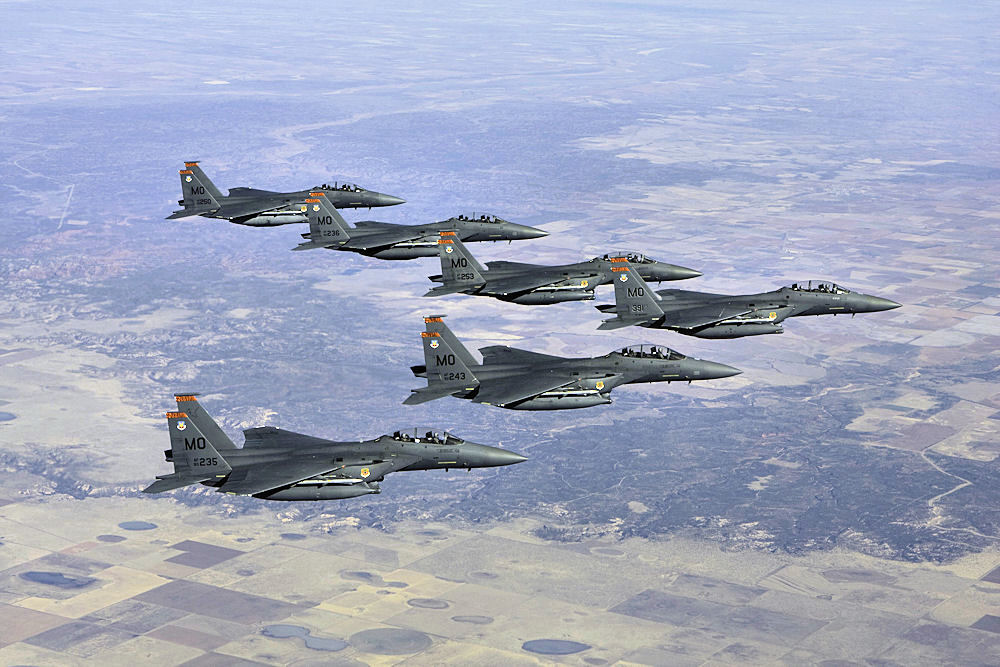
- 391st Fighter Squadron F-15 Eagle formation (Note: Aircraft are McDonnell Douglas F-15E-49-MC Strike Eagles; serials 90–0235, 90–0243, 90–0253, 90–0236, and 90–0250.)
- Active: 1943–1946; 1952–1957; 1992–2017; 2022–present
- Country: United States
- Branch: United States Air Force
- Role: Fighter
- Part of: Air Combat Command
- Garrison/HQ: Mountain Home Air Force Base
- Motto: Audentes Fortuna Juvat (Latin for 'Fortune Favors the Bold')
- Engagements: European Theater of Operations; Operation Southern Watch; Operation Provide Comfort; War on terror
- Decorations: Distinguished Unit Citation; Air Force Meritorious Unit Award; Air Force Outstanding Unit Award

Commanders
- Current commander: Col Travis H. Stephens

Insignia
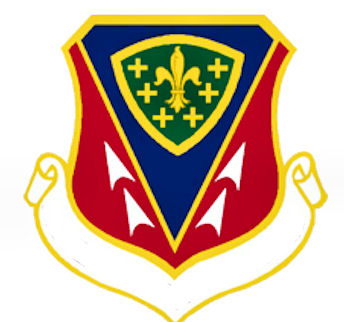
- 366th Operations Group emblem (Note: While assigned to the 366th Wing, the group uses the wing emblem with the group designation on the scroll. AF Instruction 84-105, Organizational Lineage, Honors and History, 27 April 2017, paragraph 3.3.3. Description: Gules, a pile Azure fimbriated Or between in base four flight symbols ascendant palewise two in dexter and two in sinister one over one Argent and bearing in honor point an escutcheon Vert charged with a fleur-de-lys between six crosses, three in dexter and three in sinister, within a bordure of the like [color] and all within a diminished bordure of the like [color].)

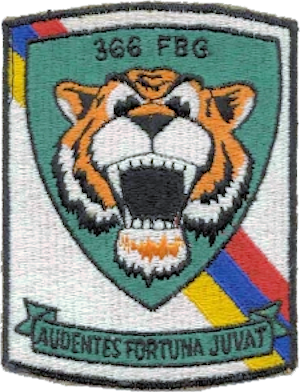
- 366th Fighter Bomber Group (Note: Approved 6 October 1954. Description: Vert, a tiger's face proper, armed and embrued [stained] gules.)

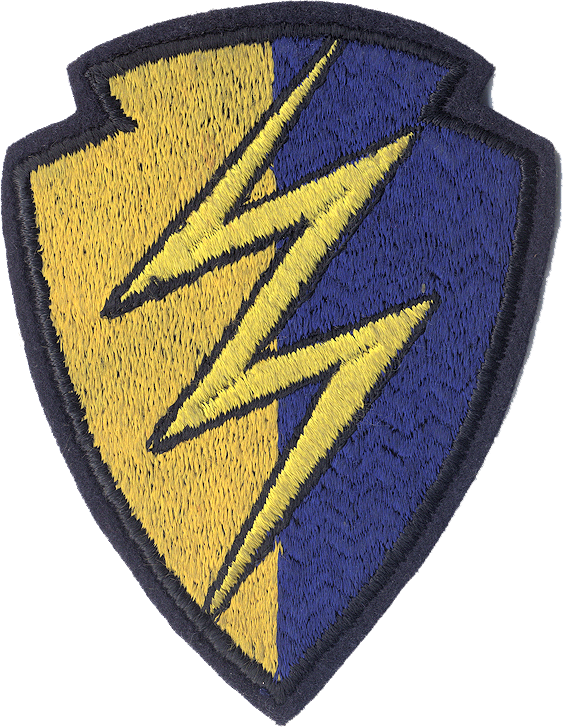
- 366th Fighter Group emblem (World War II)

The 366th Operations Group is the flying component of the 366th Fighter Wing, assigned to the United States Air Force Air Combat Command. The group is stationed at Mountain Home Air Force Base, Idaho.

== Mission ==
The 366th Operations Group is responsible for planning, operations, intelligence, weapons training, and airfield services for six squadrons assigned to the 366th Fighter Wing. It develops airspace and range schedules for more than 20,000 flying hours and 13,000 sorties annually. Their mission is also to stay ready for short-notice worldwide Air Expeditionary Force and contingency operations.

== Assigned Units ==
The 366th Operations Group (Tail Code: MO) comprises six squadrons: the 390th Electronic Combat Squadron, 389th, 391st and 428th Fighter Squadrons, 366th Operations Support Squadron and 266th Range Squadron.

- 266th Range Squadron

The 266th Range Squadron is responsible for providing electronic simulations of ground-based air defense threats on the Mountain Home AFB Range Complex consisting of: Saylor Creek AF Range, Juniper Butte AF Range and Grasmere Electronic Combat Site. 266th RANS equipment and tactics closely parallel the integrated air defense systems of potential adversaries

- 366th Operations Support Squadron

The 366th Operations Support Squadron, "Pegasus", is responsible for all airfield activities and associated support of the 366th Fighter Wing's numerous fighter missions supporting F-15SG, F-15E and Air Control Squadron operations. The 366th OSS is a diverse squadron, consisting of 185 personnel in six unique flights: airfield operations, weapons and tactics, current operations, range, intelligence and weather.

- 389th Fighter Squadron

The 389th Fighter Squadron "Thunderbolts" plan and conduct F-15E operations and contingency plans for the United States. The squadron maintains combat readiness of 71 personnel and 18 F-15E aircraft for short-notice, worldwide AEF operations. The squadrons mission is to stay ready to perform close air support, interdiction, strategic attack, suppression of enemy air defense and defensive anti air missions, employing the full array of U.S. Air Force capabilities including precision-guided munitions, inertially-aided munitions, night vision goggles, fighter data link and Low Altitude Navigation and Targeting Infrared for Night (LANTIRN).

- 390th Electronic Combat Squadron

The 390th Electronic Combat Squadron is assigned to the 366th Operations Group and is stationed at Naval Air Station Whidbey Island, WA. The 390th is tasked to man, train, and equip USAF aircrew to employ expeditionary U.S. Navy EA-6B & EA-18G aircraft in support of Unified Commanders' plans with electronic attack/information ops capability designed to they claim degrade or destroy enemy air defense systems by suppression of enemy radars and communications with complex, directional jamming and High-Speed Anti-Radiation Missiles

- 391st Fighter Squadron

The 391th Fighter Squadron "Bold Tigers" plan and conduct McDonnell Douglas F-15E Strike Eagle operations and contingency plans. The squadron maintains combat readiness of 85 personnel and 24 F-15E aircraft for short-notice, worldwide AEF operations. The squadrons mission is to be ready to perform close air support, interdiction, strategic attack, suppression of enemy air defense and defensive anti air missions, employing the full array of U.S. Air Force capabilities including precision-guided munitions, inertially-aided munitions, night vision goggles, fighter data link and Low Altitude Navigation and Targeting Infrared for Night (LANTIRN).

- 428th Fighter Squadron

The 428th Fighter Squadron "Buccaneers" plan and conduct [F-15SG Strike Eagle formal operations and maintenance training for members of the Republic of Singapore Air Force.

== History ==
For associated history and lineage, see 366th Fighter Wing

=== World War II ===
Media related to 366th Fighter Group (United States Army Air Forces) at Wikimedia Commons

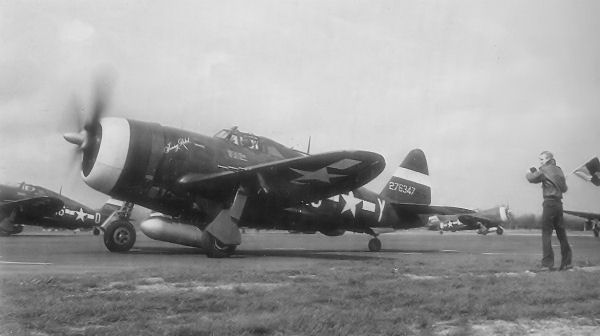
"Jenny Rebel", Republic P-47D-15-RE Thunderbolt 42-76347 of 389th Fighter Squadron shown taking off on runway 26 from RAF Thruxton airfield, 1944

Group trained in P-47s in preparation for overseas duty. Entered combat from England in March 1944 with fighter sweeps over the Bayeux-Saint-Aubin area of France. Participated in attacks on targets in France, Belgium, and Germany in preparation for the invasion of the Continent. Flew fighter sweeps over Normandy on 6 June 1944; targets included motor vehicle convoys, buildings, and gun emplacements. Moved to the Continent soon after D-Day. Received a DUC for three missions flown in support of ground forces on 11 July 1944: on a mission to destroy pillboxes near St. Lo, Normandy, France, discovered and destroyed portion of an enemy tank column unknown to Allied infantry; after rearming, the group returned to attack the tank column and prevented the enemy from accomplishing their mission. During the third mission, despite heavy rainfall, successfully attacked another Panzer battalion from minimum altitude. Group also supported Allied ground forces during the breakthrough at St. Lo in July 1944. In August 1944 attacked tanks, trucks, and troop concentrations as enemy retreated; provided armed reconnaissance for advancing Allied armored columns. During September 1944, attacked flak positions near Eindhoven during airborne landing in the Netherlands; bombed enemy communications and transportation lines in western Germany. Flew armed reconnaissance missions over Battle of the Bulge during December 1944 – January 1945; group flew 600 sorties from 17 to 27 December 1944 that resulted in the destruction of 43 enemy aircraft, 37 tanks, 328 trucks, 18 armored vehicles, four gun positions, and 15 half-tracks. Provided cover for VII Corps in January 1945 and during action destroyed over 1,000 enemy vehicles. Flew missions against enemy transportation systems including motor vehicles, bridges, trains, railway bridges, and marshalling yards during February and March 1945. Moved to Germany in April 1945. On group's last mission of the war, attacked harbors at Kiel and Flensbury on 3 May 1945. Served in occupational status in Germany from May 1945 until group inactivated.

=== Cold War ===
The group was activated on 1 January 1953 at Alexandria Air Force Base, Louisiana. It replaced the Federalized Iowa Air National Guard 132d Fighter-Bomber Group which was being returned to state control after a twenty-one-month period of activation as a result of the Korean War. The group was composed of the 389th, 390th, and 391st Fighter Squadrons. Initially using the 132nd's North American F-51D Mustangs, the 366th received North American F-86F Sabres which were returned from Korea in the summer of 1953, then received new swept-wing Republic F-84F Thunderstreaks in early 1954. On 18 March 1954, the Boeing KB-29 equipped 420th Air Refueling Squadron was attached to the wing to provide air refueling for the Thunderstreaks. The B9s were later replaced with Boeing KB-50 aerial tankers.

The group's squadrons became first TAC units to perform six-month temporary duty rotations with NATO at Aviano Air Base, Italy, with rotations continuing until group inactivated in September 1957 when parent wing adopted the dual deputate organization and assigned operational squadrons directly to the wing.

=== Modern era ===
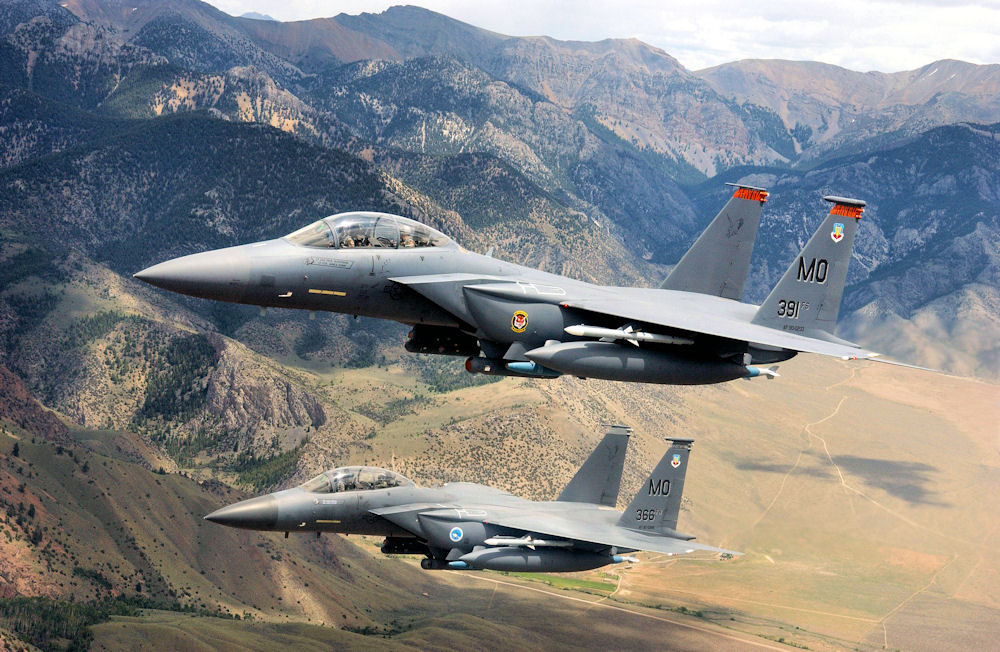
McDonnell Douglas F-15E-49-MC Strike Eagles 90-0233; 90-0246

Upon activation in 1992, assumed control of 366th Wing's operational units. Deployed assets to Southwest Asia throughout the 1990s support to Operation SOUTHERN WATCH; elements participated in Operations PROVIDE COMFORT I and PROVIDE COMFORT II in Turkey. The group's squadrons directly participated in Operation Enduring Freedom and Operation Noble Eagle following the 11 September 2001 terrorist attacks.

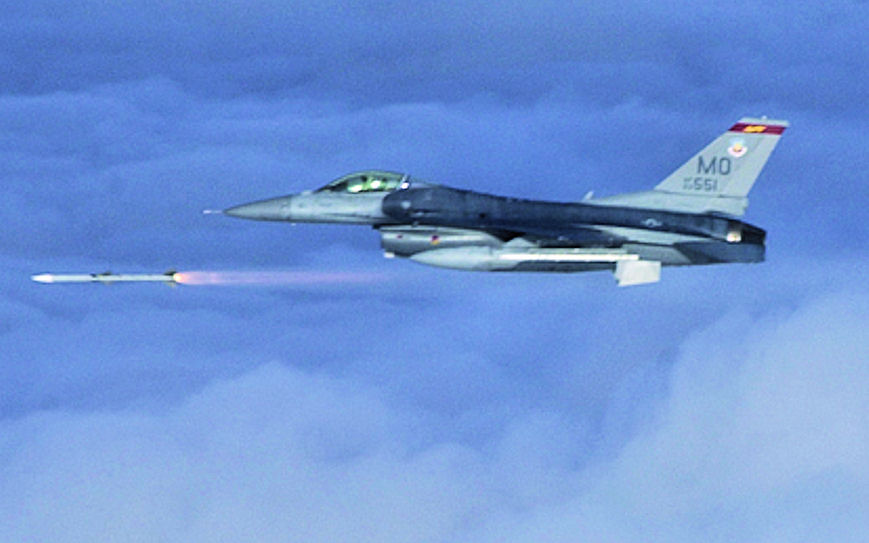
389th Fighter Squadron Lockheed F-16C Block 52Q Fighting Falcon 93-0551

After the 9/11 terrorist attacks, the consolidation of the Air Force's Boeing KC-135 Stratotanker and Rockwell B-1 Lancer force led to the reallocation of the unit's bombers and tankers to McConnell Air Force Base, Kansas, and Ellsworth Air Force Base, South Dakota The group was also home to General Dynamics F-16 Fighting Falcon aircraft from 1992 to March 2007. The F-16CJs left the base in another effort to consolidate from multiple airframes to one at Air Force installations across the country. In 2007, the group became responsible for planning, operations, intelligence, weapons training and airfield services for squadrons assigned to the 366th Wing.

== Lineage ==
- Established as the 366th Fighter Group on 24 May 1943

Activated on 1 June 1943
Inactivated on 20 August 1946

- Redesignated 366th Fighter-Bomber Group on 15 November 1952

Activated on 1 January 1953
Inactivated on 25 September 1957
Redesignated 366th Tactical Fighter Group on 31 July 1985 (Remained inactive)

- Redesignated 366th Operations Group and activated, on 1 March 1992

=== Assignments ===
- First Air Force, 24 May 1943
- I Fighter Command, 1 June 1943 (attached to Philadelphia Air Defense Wing, 1 June – 20 November 1943)
- Ninth Air Force, 8 January 1944
- IX Air Support Command, 15 February 1944
- IX Tactical Air Command, 5 May 1944
- XXIX Tactical Air Command (Prov), 1 October 1944
- IX Tactical Air Command, 22 October 1944
- IX Fighter Command, 28 January 1945

Attached to XXIX Tactical Air Command, 28 January-21 June 1945

- XIX Tactical Air Command, 28 June 1945
- XII Tactical Air Command, 4 July 1945 – 20 August 1946
- 366th Fighter-Bomber Wing, 1 January 1953 – 25 September 1957
- [366th Wing (later 366th Fighter Wing), 1 March 1992–present

=== Components ===
- 22d Air Refueling Squadron: 1 October 1992 – 30 August 2002
- 34th Bomb Squadron: 1 July 1992 – 19 September 2002
- 388th Electronic Combat Squadron: 15 December 2004 – 27 September 2010
- 389th Fighter (later, 389th Fighter-Bomber; 389th Fighter) Squadron (A6): 1 June 1943 – 20 August 1946; 1 January 1953 – 25 September 1957; 11 March 1992–present
- 390th Fighter (later, 390th Fighter-Bomber; 390th Electronic Combat; 390th Fighter; 390th Electronic Combat) Squadron (B2): 1 June 1943 – 20 August 1946; 1 January 1953 – 25 September 1957; 1 March 1992–present
- 391st Fighter (later, 391st Fighter-Bomber; 391st Fighter) Squadron (A8): 1 June 1943 – 20 August 1946; 1 January 1953 – 25 September 1957; 11 March 1992–present
- 429th Electronic Combat Squadron: 11 September 1992 – 22 June 1993
- 726th Air Control Squadron: 21 June 1996 – 30 May 2008.

=== Stations ===
- Richmond Army Air Base, Virginia, 1 June 1943
- Bluethenthal Field, North Carolina, 9 August 1943
- Richmond Army Air Base, Virginia, 6 December 1943
- Camp Myles Standish, Massachusetts, 17–28 December 1943
- RAF Membury (AAF-466), England, 10 January 1944
- RAF Thruxton (AAF-407), England, 1 March 1944
- Saint-Pierre-du-Mont Airfield (A-1), France, 17 June 1944
- Dreux/Vernouillet Airfield (A-41), France, 24 August 1944
- Laon/Couvron Airfield (A-70), France, 8 September 1944
- Asch Airfield (Y-29), Belgium, 19 November 1944
- Münster-Handorf Airfield (Y-94), Germany, 11 April 1945
- AAF Station Bayreuth/Bindlach, Germany, 25 June 1945
- AAF Station Fritzlar, Germany, 14 September 1945 – 20 August 1946
- Alexandria Air Force Base (later England) Air Force Base, Louisiana, 1 January 1953 – 25 September 1957
- Mountain Home AFB, Idaho, 1 March 1992 – present

=== Aircraft ===
- P-47 Thunderbolt, 1943–1946
- F-51 Mustang, 1953
- F-86 Sabre, 1953–1955
- F-84 Thunderjet, 1954–1957
- F-15 Eagle, 1992–present
- F-16 Falcon, 1992–2007
- EF-111 Raven, 1992–1993
- KC-135, 1992–2002
- B-52 Stratofortress, 1992–1994
- B-1 Lancer, 1994–2002
- EA-6 Prowler, 2004–2014
- EA-18 Growler, 2014–present
