= Fighter Wing: A Guided Tour of an Air Force Combat Wing =

Non-fiction book by Tom Clancy and John D. Gresham

- First edition
- Authors: Tom Clancy, John D. Gresham
- Language: English
- Subject: Military
- Publisher: Berkley Books
- Publication date: November 1995
- Publication place: United States
- Media type: Print (Hardback & Paperback)
- ISBN: 0-425-14957-9
- OCLC: 33316967
- LC Class: UG1242.F5 C58 1995
- Preceded by: Armored Cav: A Guided Tour of an Armored Cavalry Regiment (1994)
- Followed by: Marine: A Guided Tour of a Marine Expeditionary Unit (1996)

Fighter Wing: A Guided Tour of an Air Force Combat Wing (1995, ISBN 0-425-14957-9) is a nonfiction book written by Tom Clancy and John D. Gresham which explores the inner workings of the United States Air Force's 366th Fighter Wing based out of Mountain Home Air Force Base in Idaho.

With an overview of the evolution of air power such as aircraft engines, stealth, avionics, sensors, and onboard displays, it also briefly introduces the B-2 Spirit and the F-22 Raptor. The following section focuses on Operation Desert Storm and its air campaign planners and the next on the combat aircraft found on the current USAF inventory. Ordnance is tackled as well as the creation of the Air Combat Command. A tour of the 366th Wing is presented in detail including the Green Flag exercise of 1994–3. A simulated scenario of how the 366th Wing may possibly be employed in a future conflict with Vietnam is also laid out.

The final sections of the book includes the author's conclusion, a glossary and a bibliography.

== Reception ==
Kirkus Reviews recommended the novel for people who wanted to learn more about the air force.
