= II Bomber Command =

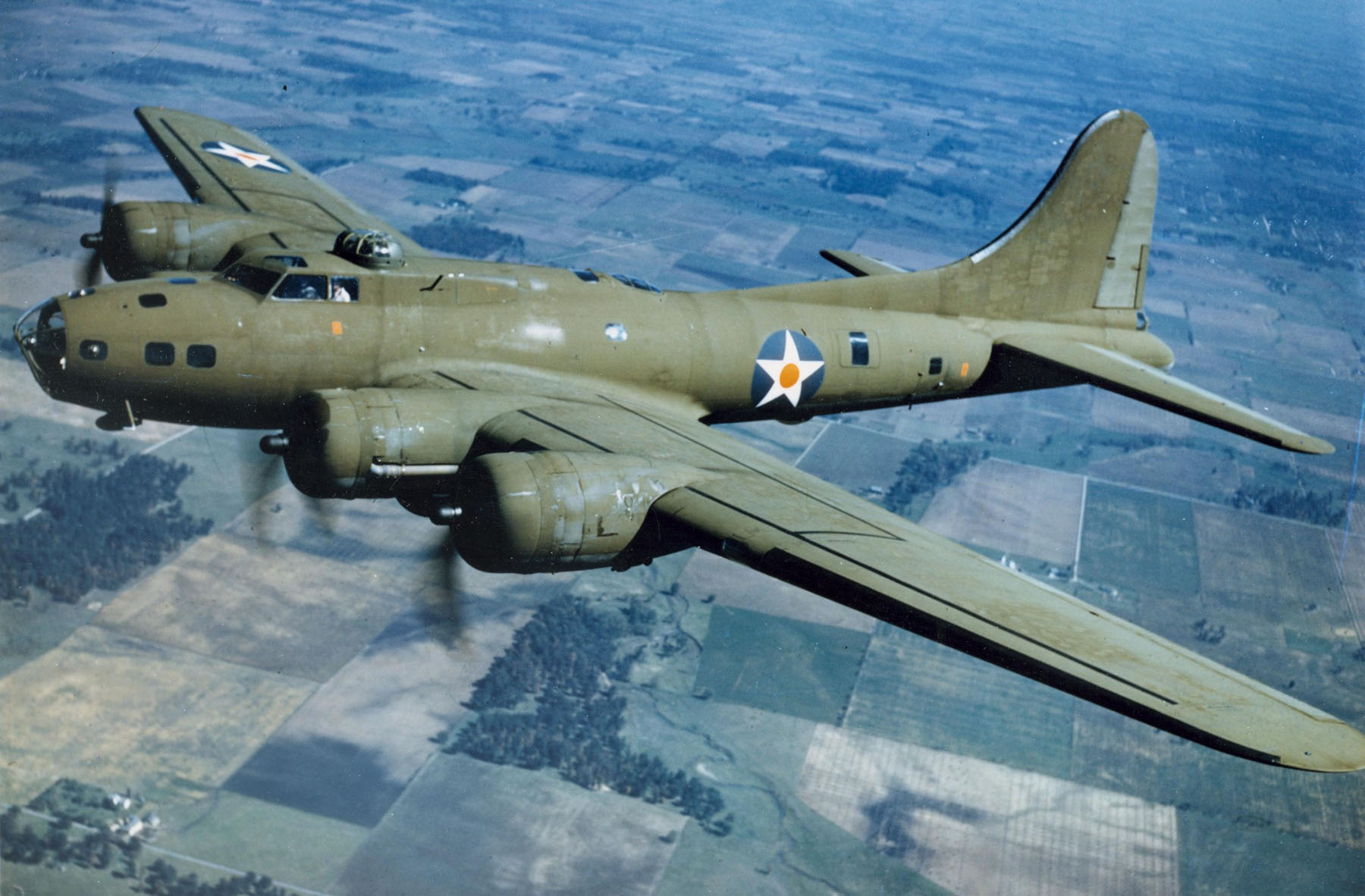
- B-17 Flying Fortress
- Active: 1941-1943
- Country: United States
- Branch: United States Army; United States Air Force
- Role: Command and training of bomber units

The II Bomber Command is a disbanded United States Air Force unit. It was established in September 1941, shortly before the attack on Pearl Harbor to command heavy bomber units assigned to Second Air Force. Following the entry of the United States into World War II, it flew patrols off the northwest Pacific coast. However, its main efforts soon began organizing and training heavy bomber units and aircrews. By 1943, the command had become the only command under Second Air Force conducting operational training, and on 6 October 1943 it was disbanded as redundant and its functions absorbed by Second Air Force or transferred to the bomber commands of the other continental air forces.

== History ==
=== Initial operations ===
GHQ Air Force (GHQ, AF) had been established with two major combat functions, to maintain a striking force against long range targets, and the air defense of the United States. In the spring of 1941, GHQ, AF reorganized its Northwest Air District as 2nd Air Force. To carry out its mission of training and maintaining a strike force, 2nd Air Force organized 2nd Bomber Command at Fort George Wright, Washington in September 1941, shortly before the attack on Pearl Harbor.

Following the attack on Pearl Harbor, the command began to perform antisubmarine and air defense patrols along the Pacific coast. Although off shore patrols continued to some degree until May 1943, by early 1942, it had become apparent that having two commands responsible for air defense in the Western Theater of Operations was impractical, and 4th Air Force assumed responsibility for air defense of the entire Pacific coast. Later in 1942, the Navy was able to assume the air antisubmarine mission entirely.

=== Unit and crew training ===
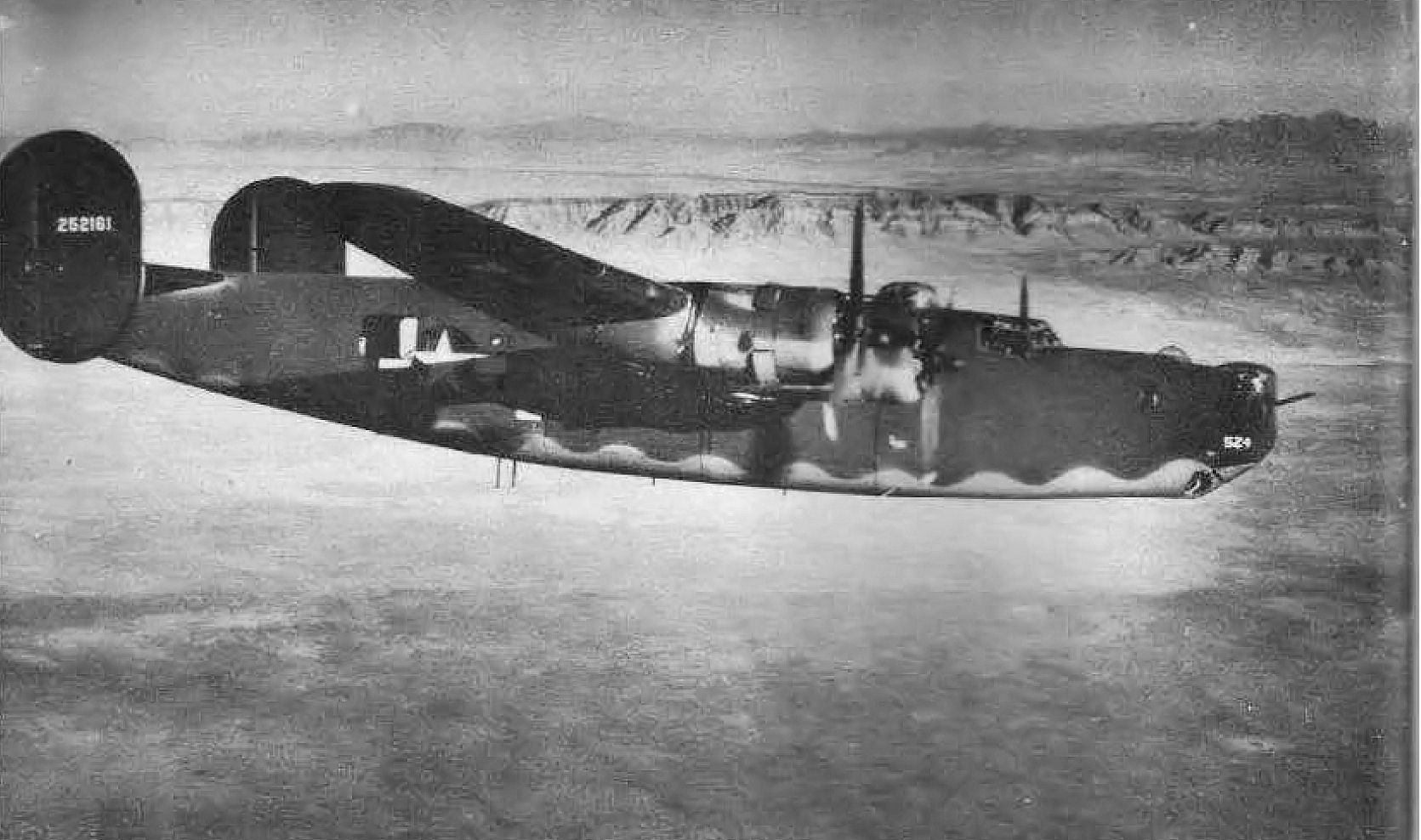
B-24 Liberator (Note: Aircraft is Consolidated B-24 Liberator, serial 42-52161 from Alamogordo Army Air Field, New Mexico, one of the command's training bases.)

As the United States entered World War II it found that its traditional system of splitting off cadres from existing groups, with the groups performing "self training" to become combat ready was inadequate for the huge expansion of the Army Air Forces (AAF) taking place. Old groups needed to be kept at or near full strength so that they could deploy overseas or perform air defense duties in the US and it was hard to spare experienced aircrew to act as instructors. Instead, planners began to look at the Operational Training Unit (OTU) system of the Royal Air Force as a model. This system provided additional training on unit tactics, rather than concentrating on individual proficiency. In January 1942, the commander of 3d Bomber Command, Follett Bradley, urged the adoption of the OTU system.

In early February 1942, the OTU program was adopted for 2nd and 3rd Air Forces, and it was expected that these two air forces would be able to manage the AAF's unit training program. Units designated as OTUs, referred to as "parent" units, would be brought up to full strength, and then a "satellite" unit would be added and also brought up to full strength. During World War II, the unit trained most heavy bomber (Boeing B-17 Flying Fortress and B-24 Liberator) bombardment groups. The command's wings specialized in a single phase of training: Phase I (individual training); Phase II (crew training) and Phase III (unit training).

At about the same time, the command began to implement the Replacement Training Unit system. to train replacement aircrews for overseas deployment. This replaced the system by which experienced personnel were withdrawn from units in the United States for overseas assignment with one in which oversized units were formed expressly to train aircrews for deployment. This training became the most important training for heavy bomber units by 1943.

=== Disbanding the command ===
However, by 1943, the command had become redundant. 2nd Fighter Command had transferred its air defense mission to 4th Fighter Command and in the fall of 1942, had transferred to the Southwest Pacific Theater as V Fighter Command. 2nd Air Support Command transferred to Third Air Force when the AAF decided to concentrate all light bomber, medium bomber, and reconnaissance under Third's control at the beginning of 1943. As the only remaining operational command in Second Air Force, II Bomber Command became an extra layer of command. Even earlier, during 1942, it had functioned more like a staff agency than as an independent command. It was disbanded in October 1943. At about the same time, some heavy bomber training was transferred to the other three continental air forces to make possible additional combined training between fighter and bomber units.

== Lineage ==
- Constituted as the 2nd Bomber Command on 4 September 1941 (Note: Maurer indicated the unit was constituted as the "II" Bomber Command. However, the unit originally held an arabic number in its designation. Only in September 1942, did the Army establish that commands would be identifified with roman numerals. "Air Force Historical Research Agency Organizational Reconds: Types of USAF Organizations". Air Force History Index. 9 January 2008..)

Activated on 5 September 1941

- Redesignated II Bomber Command c. 18 September 1942

Disbanded on 6 October 1943

=== Assignments ===
- Second Air Force, 5 September 1941 – 6 October 1943

=== Components ===
Wings

- 15th Bombardment Operational Training Wing: 15 May – 6 October 1943
- 16th Bombardment Operational Training Wing: 15 May – 6 October 1943
- 17th Bombardment Operational Training Wing, 15 May – 6 October 1943
- 46th Bombardment Operational Training Wing, 21 February – 15 May 1943
- 58th Bombardment Wing, 15 May – 8 June 1943

Groups

- 7th Bombardment Group, 5 September – c. 22 December 1941
- 17th Bombardment Group, 25 May 1941 – 9 February 1942
- 39th Bombardment Group, 5 September 1941 – 4 September 1943
- 42nd Bombardment Group, 5 September 1941 – 25 January 1942
- 46th Bombardment Group, 21 February – 15 May 1943
- 88th Bombardment Group: 15 July 1942 – 6 October 1943
- 91st Bombardment Group: c 28 June – c. 12 September 1942
- 94th Bombardment Group: 29 June 1942 – 12 May 1943
- 95th Bombardment Group: 26 June 1942 – 11 May 1943
- 100th Bombardment Group: 26 June – 30 November 1942
- 304th Bombardment Group: 28 January – 29 October 1942
- 305th Bombardment Group: 1 March – c. July 1942
- 331st Bombardment Group, 6 July 1942 – 6 October 1943
- 351st Bombardment Group, 1 October 1942 – 12 Ap ril 1943
- 379th Bombardment Group, 3 November 1942 – April 1943
- 381st Bombardment Group, 3 November 1942 – 9 May 1943
- 382d Bombardment Group, 3 November 1942 – 6 October 1943
- 384th Bombardment Group, 1 December 1942 – c. 9 May 1943
- 385th Bombardment Group, 1 February – c. 6 July 1943
- 388th Bombardment Group, 24 December 1942 – c. 6 July 1943
- 389th Bombardment Group, 24 December 1942 – June 1943
- 390th Bombardment Group, 26 January – c. 4 July 1943
- 392d Bombardment Group, 26 January – c. 1 August 1943
- 396th Bombardment Group, 16 February – 6 October 1943
- 398th Bombardment Group, 1 March 1943 – 6 October 1943
- 399th Bombardment Group, 1 March – 6 October 1943
- 401st Bombardment Group, 1 April – 6 October 1943
- 445th Bombardment Group, 1 April – 6 October 1943
- 446th Bombardment Group, April – 6 October 1943
- 447th Bombardment Group, 1 May – 6 October 1943
- 448th Bombardment Group, 1 May – 6 October 1943
- 451st Bombardment Group, 1 May – 6 October 1943
- 452d Bombardment Group, 1 June – 6 October 1943
- 455th Bombardment Group, 1 June – 4 October 1943
- 457th Bombardment Group, 4 July 1943 – 6 October 1943
- 460th Bombardment Group, 1 July – 6 October 1943
- 467th Bombardment Group, 1 August – 6 October 1943
- 470th Bombardment Group, 1 May – 6 October 1943
- 487th Bombardment Group, 20 September 1943 – 6 October 1943

=== Stations ===
- Fort George Wright, Washington, 5 September 1941 – 6 October 1943

=== Campaigns ===
Campaign Streamer	Campaign	Dates	Notes
	American Theater without inscription	7 December 1941 – 6 October 1943	2nd (later II) Bomber Command

== See also ==
- B-17 Flying Fortress units of the United States Army Air Forces
- B-24 Liberator units of the United States Army Air Forces
