= IV Bomber Command =

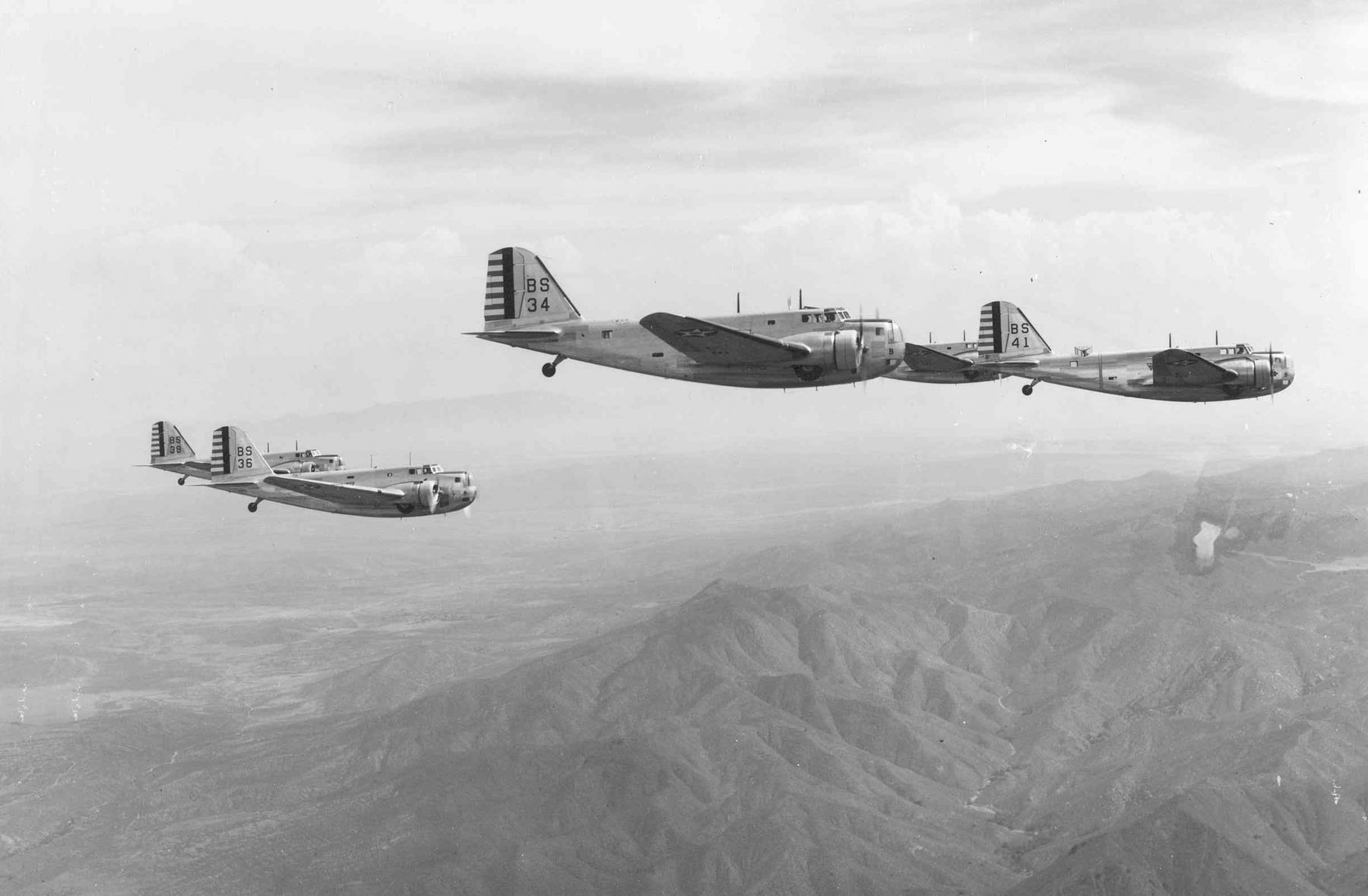
- Douglas B-18s of the 19th Bombardment Group
- Active: 1941-1944
- Country: United States
- Branch: United States Army; United States Air Force
- Role: Command and training of bombardment units
- Engagements: Antisubmarine Campaign

Commanders
- Notable commanders: Frank D. Lackland Barney M. Giles

Insignia
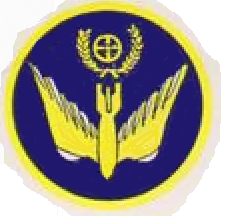
- IV Bomber Command emblem (Note: Approved 4 December 1941.)

The IV Bomber Command is a disbanded United States Air Force headquarters. It was established in September 1941, shortly before the attack on Pearl Harbor to command bomber units assigned to 4th Air Force. Following the entry of the United States into World War II, it flew patrols off the Pacific coast. However, its main efforts soon began organizing and training bomber units and aircrews. It was disbanded at San Francisco, California on 31 March 1944.

== History ==
=== Background and organization ===
GHQ Air Force (GHQ, AF) had been established with two major combat functions, to maintain a striking force against long range targets, and the air defense of the United States. In the spring of 1941, GHQ, AF reorganized its Southwest Air District as 4th Air Force. To carry out its mission of training and maintaining a strike force, 4th Air Force organized a provisional Bomber Command, 4th Air Force at March Field by April 1941. In September, the provisional command was replaced by 4th Bomber Command at Davis-Monthan Field, Arizona in September 1941. The command moved to Hamilton Field, California, after the attack on Pearl Harbor. The new command drew much of its initial cadre from the 1st Bombardment Wing, which had been stationed at Davis-Monthan since May.

=== Operations ===
Shortly after the command became organized, the attack on Pearl Harbor caused the command to relocate to move to Hamilton Field and concentrate its efforts on antisubmarine patrols off the southern Pacific coast, reinforcing units of the Western and Northwestern Sea Frontiers of the United States Navy. However, it shortly became apparent that there was little threat from Japanese submarines. and the command shifted its focus to the training of bomber units and crews. Simultaneously, the AAF moved almost all its heavy bomber training in Second Air Force, while Fourth Air Force focused on fighter aircraft, training, so the command did not grow.

In late 1943, some heavy bomber training was moved from Second Air Force, which had been the primary command for that training, to the command in order to enable combined training between fighters and bombers. In conjunction with this transfer, the command adopted the three phase training system for its training units: Phase I (individual training); Phase II (crew training) and Phase III (unit training).

In the spring of 1944, the AAF reorganized its training units to provide more flexibility in manning, rather than continuing to use rigid table of organization units. In this reorganization, the command was disbanded on 31 March 1944 and its personnel absorbed into the 400th AAF Base Unit (Headquarters, Fourth Air Force).

== Lineage ==
- Constituted as the 4th Bomber Command on 1 September 1941 (Note: This command is not related to a previous Bomber Command, 4th Air Force, apparently a provisional organization, that was organized at March Field from the 1st Bombardment Wing on 11 April 1941 and discontinued on 19 September 1941. "Abstract, History 4 Bomber Command Apr 1941-December 1942". Air Force History Index.) 1 (Note: Maurer indicates that the unit was constituted as the "IV" Bomber Command. However, the unit was constituted and activated with an arabic number in its name. The use of roman numerals to designate Army Air Forces combat commands did not begin until September 1942. "Air Force Historical Research Agency Organizational Reconds: Types of USAF Organizations". Air Force History Index. 9 January 2008.)

Activated on 19 September 1941
Redesignated IV Bomber Command on 18 September 1942
Disbanded on 31 March 1944

=== Assignments ===
- Fourth Air Force, 1 September 1941 – 31 March 1944

=== Components ===
Groups

- 14th Pursuit Group, 19 September 1941 – 26 January 1942 (attached to 4th Interceptor Command, 17 October – December 1941) (Note: Haulman says assignment began on 5 September. According to Maurer, the command was not activated until the 19th of the month. Maurer, Combat Units, pp. 441-442)
- 19th Bombardment Group, 19 September– c. 23 October 1941
- 30th Bombardment Group, 20 January 1942 – 11 October 1943
- 41st Bombardment Group, 19 September 1941 – October 1943
- 42d Bombardment Group, 25 January 1942 – 14 March 1943
- 47th Bombardment Group, attached 17 December 1941 – 15 February 1942
- 51st Pursuit Group, 19 September 1941 – c. 11 January 1942 (attached to 4th Interceptor Command after 14 October 1941)
- 399th Bombardment Group, 3 December 1943 – 31 March 1944
- 456th Bombardment Group, c. 2 October 1943 – January 1944
- 470th Bombardment Group, 6 January–31 March 1944
- 483d Bombardment Group, 20 September–7 November 1943

Squadrons

- 32nd Bombardment Squadron (attached 26 January – 16 March 1942)
- 38th Reconnaissance Squadron, 19 September – 16 December 1941 (attached to 19th Bombardment Group

=== Stations ===
- Davis-Monthan Field, Arizona, 19 September 1941
- Hamilton Field, California, c. 8 December 1941
- San Francisco, California, 5 January 1942 – 31 March 1944
