= Mountain Home School District =

Mountain Home School District may refer to:

- Mountain Home School District (Arkansas), based in Mountain Home, Arkansas
- Mountain Home School District (Idaho), based in Mountain Home, Idaho
