= 1st Bombardment Wing =

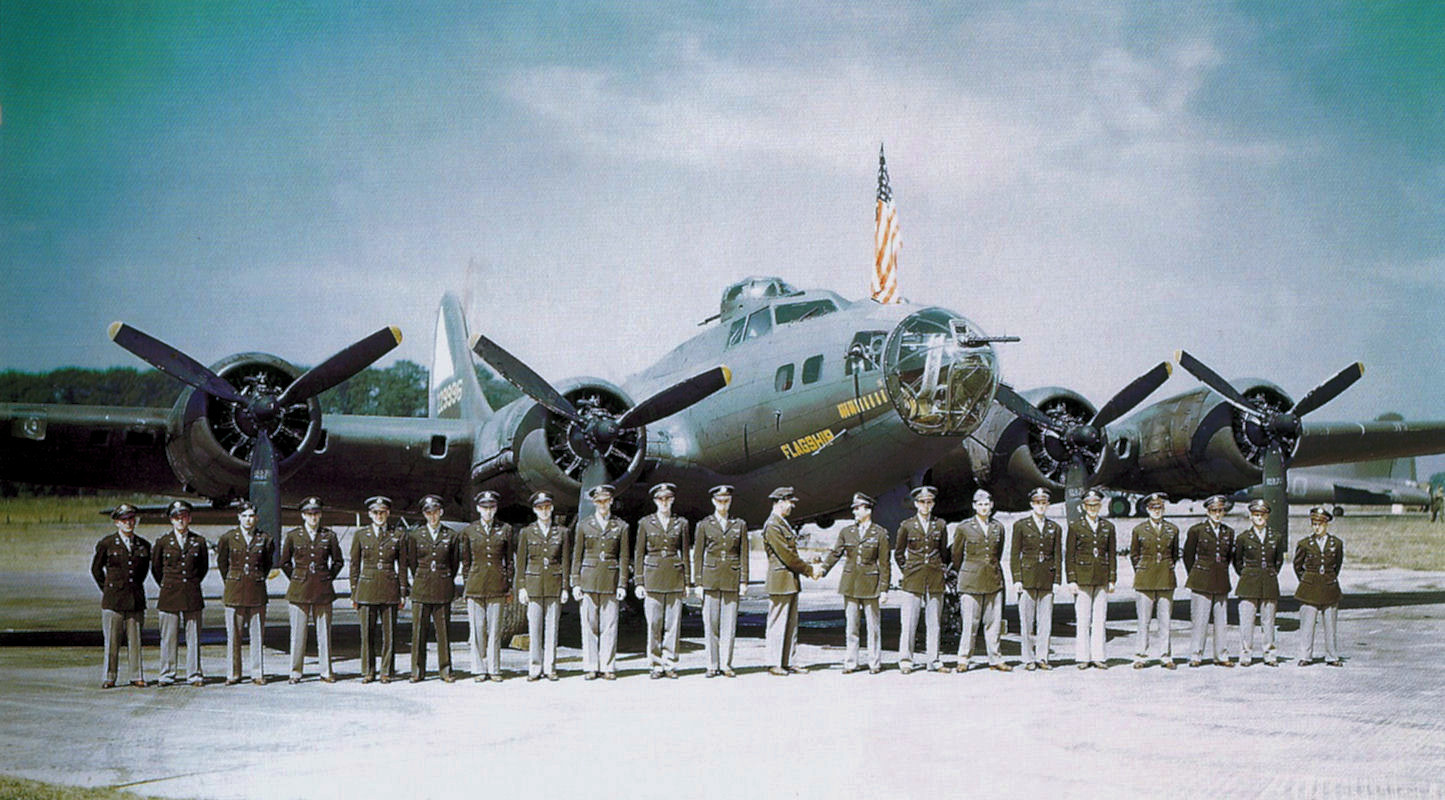
- 92d Bombardment Group senior Pilots pose in front of Boeing B-17F 42-30455 at RAF Alconbury, England, after a successful mission to Hülser Berg Germany in late June 1943. Equipped with radar, this aircraft flew several missions as the lead aircraft of the group.
- Active: 1918–1919; 1919–1924; 1931–1945
- Country: United States
- Branch: United States Army Air Forces
- Role: Bomber Command and Control
- Part of: Eighth Air Force
- Garrison/HQ: RAF Bassingbourn, England
- Engagements: World War I: Champagne-Marne Defensive Campaign; Aisne-Marne Offensive Campaign; St. Mihiel Offensive Campaign; Meuse-Argonne Offensive Campaign; World War II (EAME Theater): Air Offensive, Europe Campaign; Normandy Campaign; Northern France Campaign; Rhineland Campaign; Ardennes-Alsace Campaign; Central Europe Campaign

- Decorations: Distinguished Unit Citation: Germany, 11 January 1944

Commanders
- Notable commanders: Thomas DeW. Milling; Carl A. Spaatz; Henry H. Arnold; Laurence S. Kuter; Haywood S. Hansell; Frank A. Armstrong

Insignia
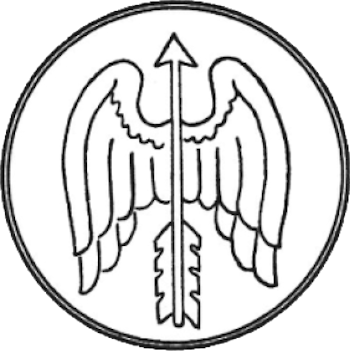
- 1st Bombardment Wing emblem

The 1st Bombardment Wing is a disbanded United States Army Air Force unit. It was initially formed in France in 1918 during World War I as a command and control organization for the Pursuit Groups of the First Army Air Service.

Demobilized after the Armistice in France, it was re-established in the United States as the first wing formed in the reorganized United States Army Air Service, created in August 1919 to control three groups patrolling the border with Mexico after revolution broke out there.

As the 1st Wing, the unit was one of the original wings of the GHQ Air Force on 1 March 1935. During World War II, it was one of the primary B-17 Flying Fortress heavy strategic bombardment wings of VIII Bomber Command and later, Eighth Air Force. Its last assignment was with the Continental Air Forces, based at McChord Field, Washington. It was inactivated on 7 November 1945.

== History ==
=== World War I ===
Organized at Croix de Metz Aerodrome, Toul Sector, France, during World War I as the 1st Pursuit Wing on 6 July 1918, it was a command and control organization in the First Army Air Service for several pursuit groups in the American Sector of the Western Front in France.

Served in combat on the St. Mihiel offensive in September, flew reconnaissance sorties, protected observation aircraft, attacked enemy observation balloons, strafed enemy troops, flew counter-air patrols, and bombed towns, bridges, and railroad stations behind the enemy's lines. Moved to Chaumont-Sur-Aire Aerodrome, and during the Meuse-Argonne offensive (26 September – 11 November 1918) bombardment aircraft continued their attacks behind the lines while pursuit ships concentrated mainly on large-scale counter-air patrols. Demobilized in France, December 1918.

=== Inter-War Period ===
Authorized in the Regular Army on 15 August 1919 as the 1st Wing Headquarters. Organized on 16 August 1919 at Kelly Field, Texas. Provided command and control of all United States Army Air Service units conducting patrol duties 1919–22 along the Mexican Border from Brownsville, Texas, to the California-Arizona border, Assigned to the GHQ, US Army in 1921. Reorganized 19 July 1922 as 1st Wing (Provisional) Headquarters and assigned responsibility to perform duties as the headquarters for the Advanced Flying School at Kelly Field. Inactivated on 26 June 1924.

Allotted to the Eighth Corps Area on 29 February 1927. Fort Sam Houston, Texas, designated as headquarters on organization, but the unit was never organized at that location. Designated headquarters location changed on 14 September 1928 to Kelly Field. Re-designated as Headquarters, 1st Bombardment Wing on 8 May 1929. Activated on 1 April 1931 at March Field, California. Re-designated as Headquarters, 1st Pursuit Wing on 18 August 1933.

Was responsible for the supervision and administration of twenty-five camps in the southern California Civilian Conservation Corps (CCC) District, 1933–34. Re-designated Headquarters, 1st Wing on 1 March 1935 and assigned to the General Headquarters Air Force (GHQAF). Transferred on 27 May 1941 to Tucson Municipal Airport, later Tucson Army Air Field, Arizona, under IV Bomber Command.

=== World War II ===
After the Pearl Harbor Attack, initially supervised Heavy Bomber Operational Training at Tucson AAF. Re-designated as 1st Bombardment Wing and reassigned to VIII Bomber Command and deployed to England July–August 1942.

In England, mission was command and control of B-17 Flying Fortress bombardment groups stationed in East Anglia, receiving operational orders from VIII BC headquarters and mobilizing subordinate groups for strategic bombardment attacks on enemy targets in Occupied Europe. Operated primarily from RAF Bassingbourn, Cambridgeshire. Served in combat in the European Theater of Operations (ETO) from August 1942 until 25 April 1945, receiving a Distinguished Unit Citation (DUC) for an attack on aircraft factories in Germany on 11 January 1944. Returned to the United States in August 1945. Inactivated on 7 November 1945.

== Lineage ==
1st Pursuit Wing

- Organized as the 1st Pursuit Wing on 6 July 1918
- Demobilized in France, 17 December 1918
- Reconstituted and consolidated with 1st Wing as the 1st Wing on 14 October 1936

1st Bombardment Wing

- Authorized as the 1st Wing on 15 August 1919

Organized and activated on 16 August 1919

- Redesignated: 1st Wing (Provisional) on 19 July 1922

Inactivated on 26 June 1924.

- Redesignated 1st Bombardment Wing on 8 May 1929

Activated on 1 April 1931
Redesignated 1st Pursuit Wing on 18 August 1933
Redesignated 1st Wing on 1 March 1935

- Consolidated with the 1st Pursuit Wing on 14 October 1936

Redesignated 1st Bombardment Wing on 19 October 1940
Redesignated 1st Combat Bombardment Wing (Heavy) in August 1943
Redesignated 1st Bombardment Wing (Heavy) in June 1945
Inactivated on 7 November 1945

- Disbanded on 15 June 1983

=== Assignments ===
- First Army Air Service, 6 July – 17 December 1918
- United States Army Air Service, 16 August 1919
- United States Army Air Service, 14 March 1921
- Advanced Flying School, Kelly Field, Texas, 19 July 1922 – 26 June 1924
- United States Army Air Corps, 1 April 1931
- General Headquarters Air Force, 1 March 1935
- Southwest Air District, 19 October 1940
- IV Bomber Command, 1 September 1941
- VIII Bomber Command, 19 August 1942
- 1st Bombardment Division, 13 September 1943

Re-designated: 1st Air Division: 19 December 1944 – 26 August 1945

- Continental Air Forces, 6 September – 7 November 1945

=== Stations ===
- Croix de Metz Aerodrome, Toul, France, 6 July 1918
- Chaumont, France, c. 24 September 1918 – 17 December 1918
- Kelly Field, Texas, 16 August 1919 – 26 June 1924
- March Field, California, April 1931
- Tucson Municipal Airport, Arizona, 27 May 1941 – July 1942
- Brampton Grange (AAF-103), England, c. 19 August 1942
- RAF Bassingbourn (AAF-121), England, September 1943
- RAF Alconbury (AAF-102), England, c. 26 June – c. 26 August 1945
- McChord Field, Washington, c. 6 September – 7 November 1945.

=== Components ===
World War I

- 1st Pursuit Group, 6 July 1918 – 17 December 1918
- 2d Pursuit Group, 6 July 1918 – 17 December 1918
- 3d Pursuit Group, 6 July 1918 – 17 December 1918

Inter-War period

- 1st Pursuit Group, 1919–1922; 1933–1935
- 2d (formerly 1st) Bombardment Group, 1918; 1919–1922
- 3d Attack (formerly 1st Surveillance) Group, 1919–1924
- 7th Bombardment Group, 1931–1933, 1935–1941
- 8th Pursuit Group, 1933–1935
- 17th Bombardment Group, 1931–1941
- 19th Bombardment Group, 1935–1941
- 10th Pursuit Group, 1939–1941
- 35th Pursuit Group, 1940–1941
- 41st Bombardment Group, 1941

World War II (VIII Bomber Command)

- 91st Bombardment Group, September 1942 – 23 June 1945

Attached to: 201st Provisional Combat Bombardment Wing, February – 13 September 1943

- 92d Bombardment Group, August 1942 – 13 September 1943

Attached to: 102d Provisional Combat Bombardment Wing, May – 13 September 1943

- 93d Bombardment Group, 6 September – 6 December 1942
- 97th Bombardment Group*, August – 9 November 1942
- 301st Bombardment Group*, 9 August – 2 September 1942
- 303d Bombardment Group, 10 September 1942 – 13 September 1943

Attached to: 102d Provisional Combat Bombardment Wing, February–May 1943
Attached to: 103d Provisional Combat Bombardment Wing, May – 13 September 1943

- 305th Bombardment Group, September 1942 – 13 September 1943

Attached to: 102d Provisional Combat Bombardment Wing, February – 13 September 1943

- 306th Bombardment Group, September 1942 – 13 September 1943

Attached to: 101st Provisional Combat Bombardment Wing, February – June 1943
Attached to: 102d Provisional Combat Bombardment Wing, June – 13 September 1943

- 351st Bombardment Group, May 1943 – 1 November 1943

Attached to: 101st Provisional Combat Bombardment Wing, May – 13 September 1943

- 379th Bombardment Group, May – 13 September 1943

Attached to: 103d Provisional Combat Bombardment Wing, May – 13 September 1943

- 381st Bombardment Group, June 1943 – 1 January 1945

Attached to: 101st Provisional Combat Bombardment Wing, June – 13 September 1943

- 384th Bombardment Group, June – 13 September 1943

Attached to: 103d Provisional Combat Bombardment Wing, June – 13 September 1943

- 398th Bombardment Group, 22 April 1944 – 22 June 1945
- 482d Bombardment Group, 20 August 1943 – 24 June 1945

* Note: Reassigned to Twelfth Air Force

== See also ==
- Organization of the Air Service of the American Expeditionary Force
