= Mountain Home Air Force Base =

US Air Force base near Mountain Home, Idaho, United States

- Near Mountain Home, Idaho in the U.S.
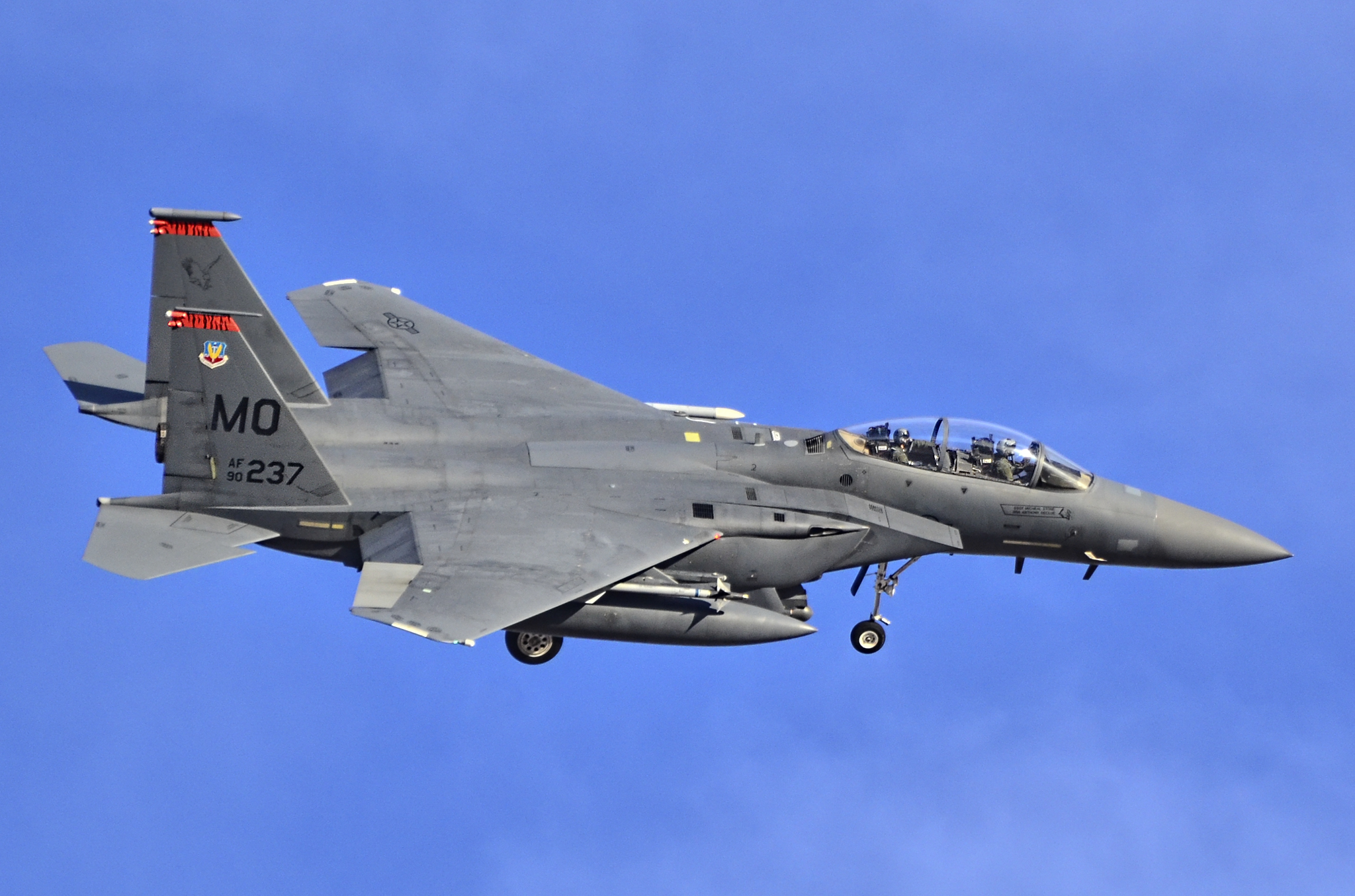
- F-15E Strike Eagle of the 391st Fighter Squadron based at Mountain Home AFB.

Site information
- Type: U.S. Air Force Base
- Owner: Department of Defense
- Operator: U.S. Air Force
- Controlled by: Air Combat Command (ACC)
- Condition: Operational
- Website: www.mountainhome.af.mil

Location
- Location in North America Location in the United States Location in Idaho
- Coordinates: 43.04°N 115.87°W

Site history
- Built: 1942 – 1943
- In use: 1943–1945; 1948 – present

Garrison information
- Current commander: Colonel Michael C. Alfaro
- Garrison: 366th Fighter Wing (Host)

Airfield information
- Identifiers: IATA: MUO, ICAO: KMUO, FAA LID: MUO, WMO: 726815
- Elevation: 2,996 ft (913.1 m) AMSL
Runways
Direction	Length and surface
12/30	13,510 ft (4,117.8 m); Porous European Mix

Mountain Home Air Force Base (IATA: MUO, ICAO: KMUO, FAA LID: MUO) is a United States Air Force (USAF) installation in the western United States. Located in southwestern Idaho in Elmore County, the base is twelve miles (20 km) southwest of Mountain Home, which is forty miles (65 km) southeast of Boise via Interstate 84. The base also hosts the Republic of Singapore Air Force (RSAF), which has a detachment of F-15SG combat aircraft on long term assignment to the base and a squadron composed of RSAF and USAF personnel.

Constructed in the early 1940s during World War II as a training base for bombers, after the war it briefly had transports, then was a bomber and missile base, and became a fighter base in 1966. The host unit at Mountain Home since 1972 has been the 366th Fighter Wing (366 FW) of the Air Combat Command (ACC), nicknamed the Gunfighters. The base's primary mission is to provide combat airpower and support for worldwide contingency operations. On 10 October 2025, defense secretary Pete Hegseth announced that the base would host a Qatar Emiri Air Force facility.

Part of the base is a census-designated place (CDP); the population was 3,238 at the 2010 census.

== History ==
Crews started building the base in November 1942 and the new field officially opened on 7 August 1943. Shortly thereafter, airmen at the field began training U.S. Army Air Forces crews for World War II. The 396th Bombardment Group (Heavy) was the first unit assigned and its planned mission was to train crews for the B-17 Flying Fortress. However, before the first B-17s arrived, plans for the field changed and the 396th was transferred to Moses Lake AAF, Washington (state).

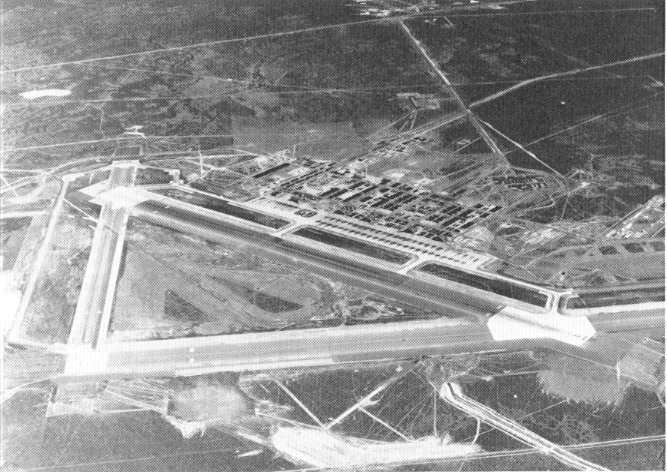
Oblique aerial photo in June 1945 of Mountain Home Army Air Field

Mountain Home airmen then transitioned to training crews for the B-24 Liberator. The first group to do so was the 470th Bombardment Group (Heavy), which trained at Mountain Home from May 1943 until January 1944, when the unit moved to Tonopah AAF Nevada. The 490th Bombardment Group (Heavy) replaced the 470th and trained B-24 crews until it deployed to RAF Eye England in April 1944. The 494th Bombardment Group then replaced the 490th, once more training Liberator crews.

The base was placed in inactive status in October 1945.

=== Postwar era ===
The base remained inactive for over three years until December 1948, when the newly independent U.S. Air Force (USAF) reopened the base. The 4205th Air Base Group was activated on 12 December to prepare the newly re-designated Mountain Home Air Force Base for operational use.

Three wings of the Air Resupply and Communications Service used the base in the early 1950s.

In 1953, the base was transferred to Strategic Air Command (SAC), which assigned its 9th Bombardment Wing to Mountain Home. The 9th relocated to Mountain Home AFB in May 1953 and began flying B-29 bombers and KB-29H refueling aircraft. The 9th began converting to the new B-47 Stratojet bomber and the KC-97 tanker in September 1954, keeping alert bombers ready for war at a moment's notice and continuing its mission as a deterrent force throughout the Cold War years of the 1950s and early 1960s.

In 1959, construction of three SM-68 Titan missile sites began in the local area, and missiles arrived in April 1962. The 569th Strategic Missile Squadron controlled these sites and was assigned to the 9th Bombardment Wing in August 1962. To prepare for the addition of missiles to its bomber forces, it was redesignated the 9th Strategic Aerospace Wing in April 1962.

A few years later, SAC's mission at Mountain Home began to wind down, and in November 1964, the USAF announced that the missile sites would close by mid-1965, part of a major round of base closures announced by Secretary of Defense Robert McNamara. Other closures in the region were also USAF facilities: the Cottonwood radar station in north central Idaho and SAC's Larson AFB, a B-52E Stratofortress (and KC-135A Stratotanker) installation in Eastern Washington at Moses Lake.

In late 1965, the USAF also began phasing out the aging B-47 and announced plans to bring the 67th Tactical Reconnaissance Wing to Mountain Home, transferring the base from SAC to the Tactical Air Command (TAC) in early 1966.

The Republic of Singapore Air Force (RSAF) has been training at Mountain Home since 1998. As such, the 428th Fighter Squadron consists of a joint squadron of air forces of both countries. Prior to this, the RSAF has also been training at Luke Air Force Base in Arizona since the 1980s.

On 10 October 2025, Secretary of Defense Pete Hegseth announced that a formal letter of acceptance had been signed with Qatar to establish an Qatar Emiri Air Force facility at Mountain Home AFB; it shall host a contingent of F-15s. The announcement took place with Qatar's Deputy Prime Minister and Minister of Defense Saoud bin Abdulrahman Al Thani sitting at his side. Rep. Mike Simpson hailed the agreement on X: "This development is beneficial for training, enhances our partnership with America's allies, and strengthens national security."

=== 366th Fighter Wing ===
The 366th Fighter Wing (in various designations) has been the host unit at Mountain Home for over 50 years, following its return from the Vietnam War in late 1972.

Before the 366th Tactical Fighter Wing's arrival at Mountain Home, the 389th, 390th, and 391st Tactical Fighter Squadrons had returned from South Vietnam, joined the 347th, and began converting to F-111A Aardvark aircraft. For the first time since it left for Vietnam, the wing once again had its three original flying units.

During 1969, a tenant unit began operating at the south end of the base, using part of the original SAC alert area, and about half of the Mole Hole alert facility, sharing the other half with an NCO leadership school from the main base. Det. 1, 320 BW carried out an alert mission with two B-52 bombers and two KC-135 tankers. The unit disbanded in the spring of 1975 and returned to Mather AFB.

Operations continued unchanged for several years. The wing tested its readiness in August 1976 when a border incident in Korea prompted the U.S. to augment its military contingent in South Korea as a show of force. The 366th deployed a squadron of 20 F-111 fighters, which reached South Korea only 31 hours after receiving launch notification. Tensions eased shortly afterward and the detachment returned home.

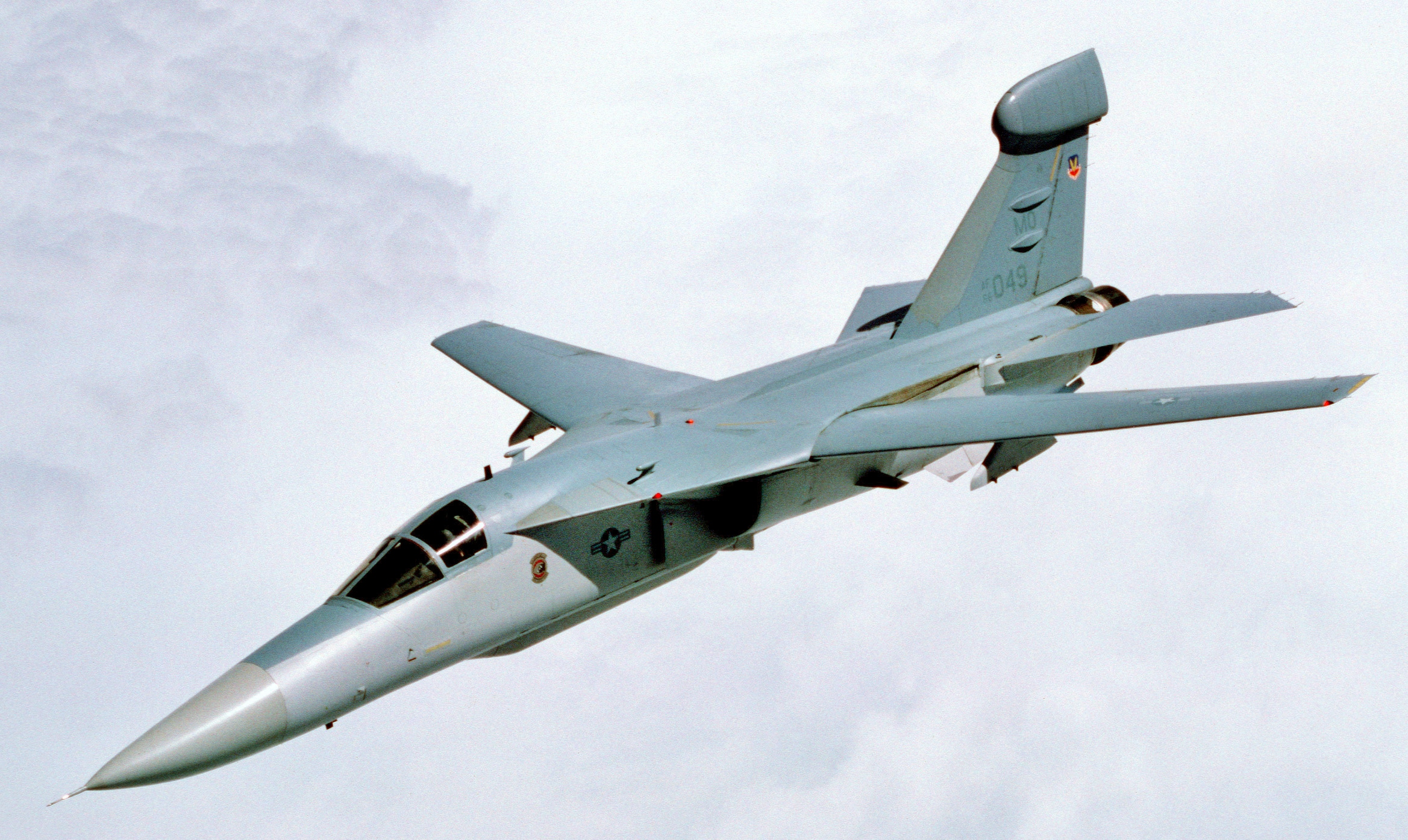
EF-111A Raven in 1987

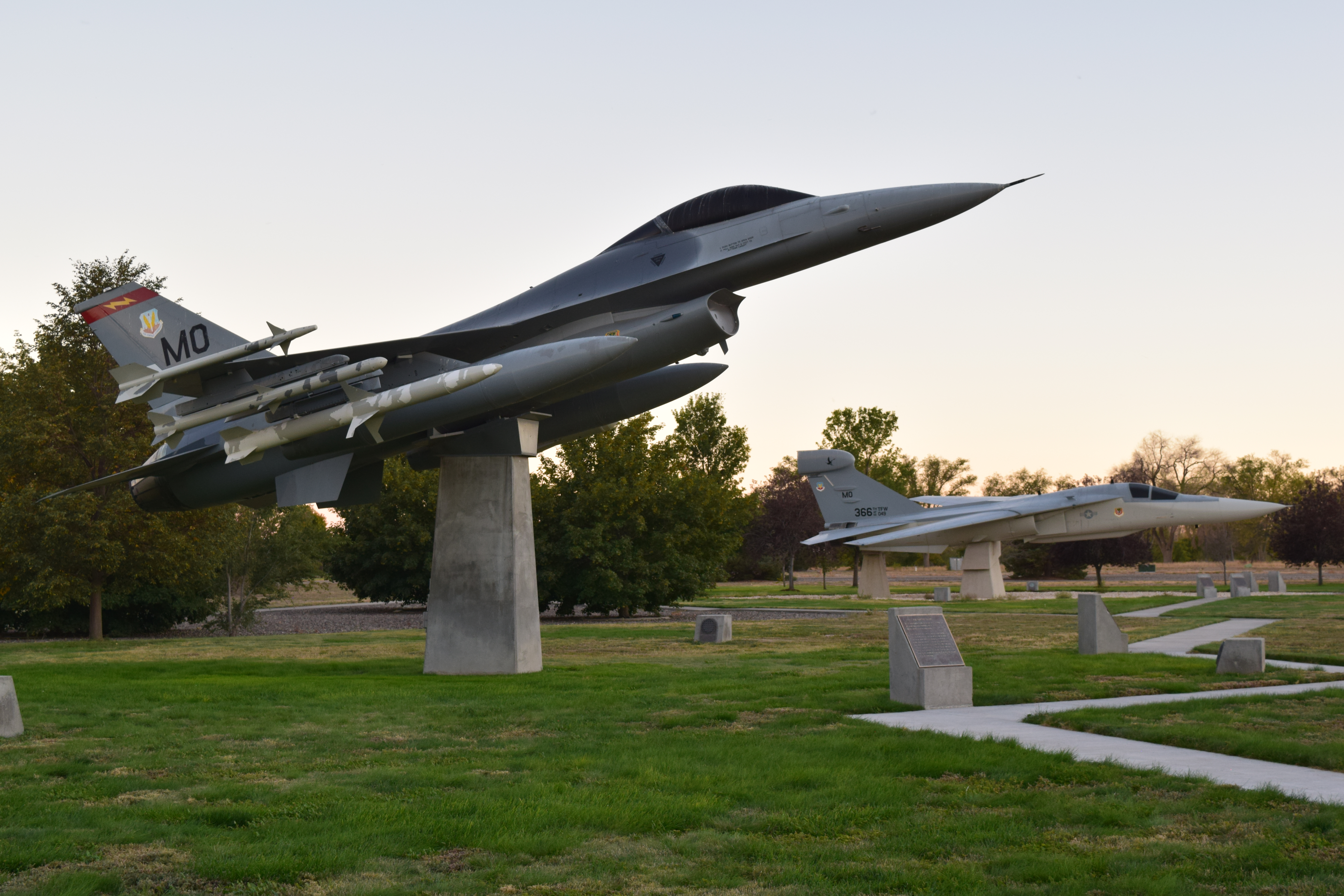
F-16 and EF-111 on display at the base

In early 1991, the USAF announced that the 366th would become the Air Force's premier "air intervention" composite wing. The wing would grow with the addition of a squadron of EF-111A Raven electronic warfare aircraft and a squadron of B-1B Lancer bombers to become a dynamic, five squadron wing with the ability to deploy rapidly and deliver integrated combat airpower.

The air intervention composite wing's rapid transition from concept to reality began in October 1991 when the USAF redesignated the wing as the 366th Wing. The wing's newly reactivated "fighter squadrons" became part of the composite wing in March 1992. The 389th Fighter Squadron began flying the dual-role F-16C Fighting Falcon, while the 391st Fighter Squadron was equipped with the new F-15E Strike Eagle. These two squadrons provide the Gunfighters round-the-clock precision strike capability.

Following the terrorist attacks on 11 September 2001, the resultant initiation of Operation Enduring Freedom, the 366th Wing once again got the call. While the 34th Bomb Squadron deployed to Diego Garcia as the B-1 component of the 28th Air Expeditionary Wing, the wing sent a Base Operations Support package to Al Udeid Air Base, Qatar, to transform the bare base into a fully functional airfield for large-scale combat operations. In October 2001, the 391st Fighter Squadron deployed to Al Jaber Air Base, Kuwait, while the 389th Fighter Squadron went to Al Udeid in November.

Following the wing's return from Southwest Asia, the USAF began consolidating its B-1 Lancer and KC-135 Stratotanker forces. This led to the reallocation of the wing's bombers and tankers. The 22 ARS' aircraft began transferring to McConnell AFB, Kansas, in May 2002 and the squadron inactivated the following August. The 34 BS' B-1Bs began moving to Ellsworth AFB, South Dakota, in June and the squadron officially moved in September. Following the departure of these assets, the USAF re-designated the 366th as a Fighter Wing. With these changes, the wing's 10-year mission as the Air Force's only standing air expeditionary wing came to an end. A continued reconstruction of the 366 Fighter Wing was official with the 2005 base realignment, coinciding with the large scale integration of the 150+ F-22 Raptors. After the F-16 departure, Mountain Home AFB was chosen to become an F-15E installation because of its ideal training terrain range that is suited for air-to-ground, and air-to-air training missions.

==== Thunderbirds crash ====
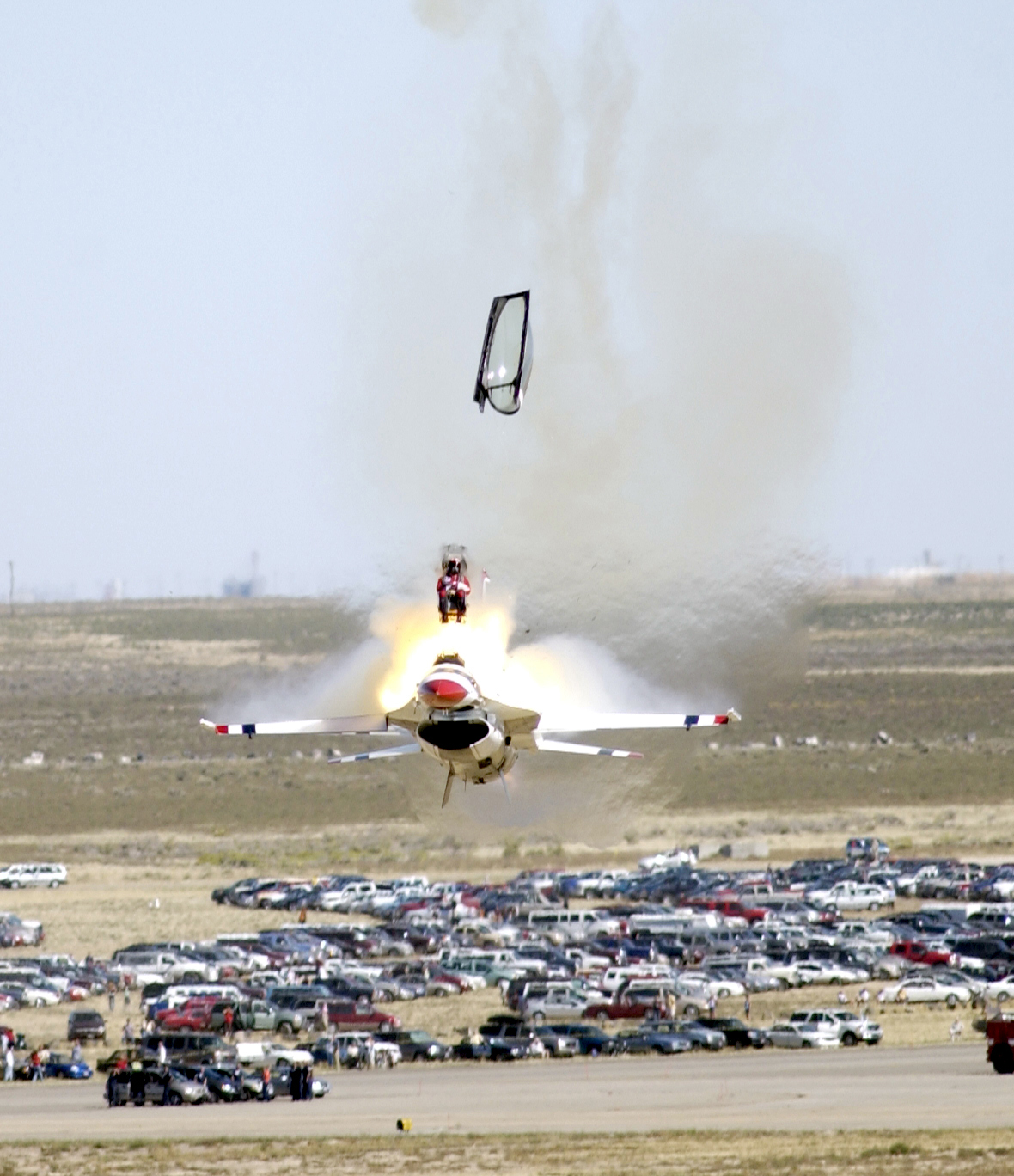
Captain Chris Stricklin ejects from his F-16C at MHAFB in September 2003

The base was the site of a Thunderbirds crash on 14 September 2003 in which no one was killed. Captain Chris Stricklin, flying Thunderbird 6 (opposing solo, serial #87-0327), attempted a "Split S" maneuver (which he had performed over 200 times) immediately after takeoff based on an incorrect mean-sea-level elevation. Similar in desert appearance, Mountain Home AFB is over 1,100 feet (340 m) higher than the Thunderbirds' home at Nellis AFB near Las Vegas, Nevada.

Climbing to only 1,670 ft (510 m) above ground level (AGL) instead of 2,500 ft (760 m), Stricklin had insufficient altitude to complete the descending half-loop maneuver. He guided the F-16C aircraft down runway 30, away from the spectators and ejected less than one second before impact. His parachute deployed when he was just above the ground and Stricklin survived with only minor injuries. No one on the ground was injured, but the $20 million aircraft was destroyed.

Official procedure for demonstration "Split-S" maneuvers was changed, and the USAF now requires Thunderbird pilots and airshow ground controllers to both work in above mean-sea-level (AMSL) altitudes, as opposed to ground control working in AGL and pilots in AMSL, which led to two sets of numbers that had to be reconciled by the pilot. Thunderbird pilots now also climb an extra 1,000 ft (300 m) before performing the Split S maneuver.

==== Humvee accident ====
On 24 June 2022, nineteen Air Force ROTC cadets were participating in a training exercise when there was an accident involving a Humvee. One cadet, nineteen-year-old Mackenzie Wilson, was pronounced dead at the scene while two other cadets were taken to nearby St. Alphonsus Hospital in Boise and treated for injuries.

After an investigation by the Idaho State Police, with assistance from the Air Force Office of Special Investigations, it was discovered that the Humvees were not authorized for use as transportation and did not meet Air Force standards for maintenance. The investigator of the case told the bomb range manager, who had let the cadets drive the Humvees unsupervised on their final day of training, that he was suspected for the crime of misusing government property. An ROTC officer who had been supervising the group during the week was also informed he was suspected of dereliction of duty under the military code.

==== E/A-18 Growler mid-air collision ====
On 17 May 2026, two E/A-18 Growler aircraft belonging to and operated by the U.S. Navy collided in mid-air while performing maneuvers on the second day of the Gunfighter Skies Air Show. All four crew members involved ejected successfully and are in stable condition; an investigation of the accident is ongoing.

=== Previous names ===
- Army Air Base, Mountain Home, Nov 1942
- Mountain Home Army Air Field, 2 December 1943.
- Mountain Home Air Force Base, 13 January 1948 – present

=== Major commands to which assigned ===
- Second Air Force, 29 August 1942
- Fourth Air Force, 15 February 1945
- Continental Air Forces, 16 April 1945

Temporary inactive status, 5 October 1945.
Subbase of Gowen Army Airfield (Boise), Idaho, 9 October 1945
Subbase of Walla Walla Army Airfield, Washington, 31 December 1945 – 30 September 1946

- Strategic Air Command, 21 March 1946

Activated on 1 December 1948
Inactivated on 25 April 1950
Subbase of Fairfield-Suisun (later, Travis) AFB, California, c. 1 April 1950 – 24 January 1951

- Military Air Transport Service, 24 January 1951

Activated on 1 February 1951

- Strategic Air Command, 1 May 1953
- Tactical Air Command, 1 January 1966
- Air Combat Command, 1 June 1992 – present

=== Major units assigned ===
- 396th Bombardment Group (Heavy), 16 February–10 April 1943
- 470th Bombardment Group (Heavy), 1 May 1943 – 1 January 1944
- 467th Bombardment Group (Heavy), 8 September–17 October 1943
- 490th Bombardment Group, Heavy, 4 December 1943 – 20 April 1944
- 494th Bombardment Group (Heavy), 15 April–1 June 1944
- 4205th Air Base Group, 12 December 1948 – 16 July 1949
- 5th Reconnaissance Group, Very Long Range, Photo, 29 May-16 July 1949
- 5th Strategic Reconnaissance Wing, 16 July–11 November 1949
- 1300th Air Base Wing, 1 November 1951 – 30 April 1953
- 580th Air Resupply and Communications Wing, 16 April 1951 – 17 September 1952
- 581st Air Resupply and Communications Wing, 23 July 1951 – 26 June 1952
- 582nd Air Resupply and Communications Wing, 24 September 1952 – 1 May 1953
- 9th Bombardment Wing, Medium (later 9th Strategic Aerospace Wing), 1 May 1953 – 25 June 1966
- 813th Air Division, 1 July 1959 – 1 July 1964
- 569th Strategic Missile Squadron, June 1961 – March 1965
- 67th Tactical Reconnaissance Wing, 1 January 1966 – 15 July 1971
- 347th Tactical Fighter Wing, 15 May 1971 – 31 October 1972
- 366th Tactical Fighter Wing, 31 October 1972 – 1 October 1991

Redesignated 366th Wing, 1 October 1991 – 27 September 2002
Redesignated 366th Fighter Wing, 27 September 2002 – present

=== Intercontinental ballistic missile facilities ===
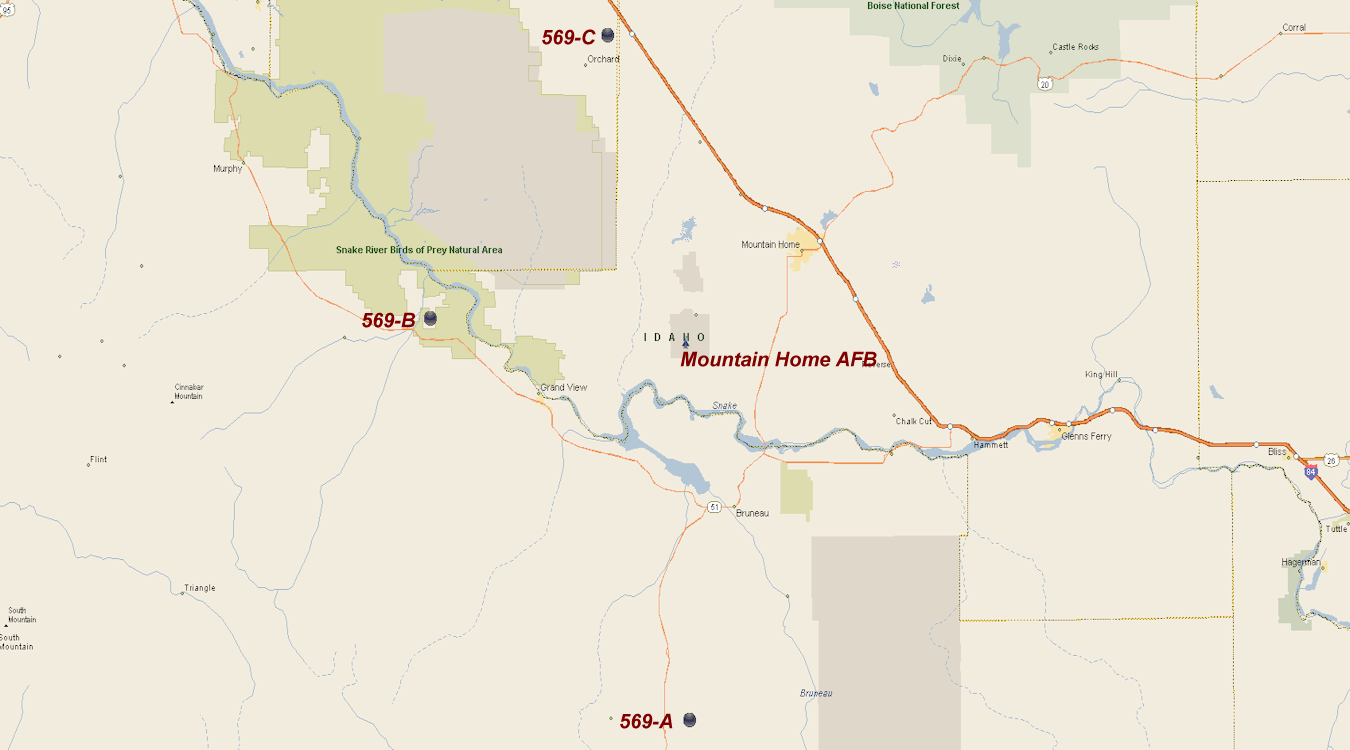
569th Strategic Missile Squadron- Titan I Missile Sites

The 569th Strategic Missile Squadron Operated three HGM-25A Titan I ICBM sites: (1 Jun 1961 – 25 June 1965). The first missiles arrived in April 1962.

== Role and operations ==
Mountain Home AFB is the home of the 366th Fighter Wing (366 FW), which reports to Air Combat Command (ACC). The mission of the 366 FW is to prepare Airmen and their families, professionally and personally, for expeditionary operations and foster an environment that promotes integration of all facets of wing operations.

The wing comprises three operational fighter squadrons:

- 366th Operations Group (Tail code: "MO")

389th Fighter Squadron (F-15E Strike Eagle)
391st Fighter Squadron (F-15E Strike Eagle)
428th Fighter Squadron (F-15SG) Republic of Singapore Air Force

In addition, the 726th Air Control Squadron gives an air picture to the aircraft as they train. An active Idaho Air National Guard unit, the 266th Range Squadron, controls and maintains emitter sites within the 7,412 sq mi (19,200 km^{2}) operational training range in southwestern Idaho.

== Based units ==
The following flying and notable non-flying units have been based at Mountain Home.

Units marked GSU are Geographically Separate Units, which although based at Mountain Home, are subordinate to a parent unit based at another location.

=== United States Air Force ===
Air Combat Command (ACC)

- Fifteenth Air Force
  - 366th Fighter Wing
    - 366th Comptroller Squadron
    - 366th Operations Group
      - 366th Operation Support Squadron
      - 389th Fighter Squadron – F-15E Strike Eagle
      - 391st Fighter Squadron – F-15E Strike Eagle
      - 428th Fighter Squadron – F-15SG Strike Eagle (In collaboration with the Republic of Singapore Air Force)
    - 366th Maintenance Group
      - 389th Fighter Generation Squadron
      - 391st Fighter Generation Squadron
      - 366th Maintenance Squadron
      - 366th Munitions Squadron
    - 366th Medical Group
      - 366th Aerospace Medicine Squadron
      - 366th Medical Operations Squadron
      - 366th Medical Support Squadron
    - 366th Mission Support Group
      - 366th Civil Engineer Squadron
      - 366th Communications Squadron
      - 366th Contracting Squadron
      - 366th Force Support Squadron
      - 366th Logistics Readiness Squadron
      - 366th Security Forces Squadron
  - 552nd Air Control Wing
    - 552nd Air Control Group
      - 726th Air Control Squadron (GSU)

Air National Guard (ANG)

- Idaho Air National Guard
  - 124th Fighter Wing
    - 266th Range Squadron (GSU)

== Geography ==
Mountain Home AFB is located at (43.049511, −115.866452), at an elevation of 2,996 ft (913 m) above sea level. It is in the western portion of the Snake River Plain, about 3 miles (5 km) north of C. J. Strike Reservoir, an impoundment of the Snake River (and Bruneau River).

According to the United States Census Bureau, the CDP has a total area of 9.9 mi^{2} (26 km^{2}), and 0.10% is water.

It is connected to the city of Mountain Home by State Highway 67.

== Demographics ==
Historical population
Census	Pop.	Note	%±
1970	6,038		—
1980	6,403		6.0%
1990	5,936		−7.3%
2000	8,894		49.8%
2010	3,238		−63.6%
2020	3,191		−1.5%

As of the census of 2000, there were 8,894 people, 1,476 households, and 1,452 families residing in the CDP. The population density was 896 inhabitants per square mile (346/km^{2}). There were 1,590 housing units at an average density of 160 per square mile (62/km^{2}). The racial makeup of the CDP was 83.2% White, 6.9% Black or African American, 0.8% Native American, 2.5% Asian, 0.2% Pacific Islander, 2.7% from other races, and 3.7% from two or more races. Hispanic or Latino of any race were 6.5% of the population.

There were 1,476 households, of which 76.4% had children under the age of 18, 91.9% were married couples, 4.4% had a female householder with no husband present, and 1.6% were non-families. 1.4% of all households were made up of individuals, and none had anyone living alone who was 65 years of age or older. The average household size was 3.40 and the average family size was 3.43.

In the CDP, the population was spread out, with 24.0% under the age of 18, 24.4% from 18 to 24, 49.7% from 25 to 44, 1.8% from 45 to 64, and 0.1% who were 65 years of age or older. The median age was 25 years. For every 100 females, there were 180.8 males. For every 100 females age 18 and over, there were 219.5 males.

The median income for a household in the CDP was $31,634, and the median income for a family was $31,377. Males had a median income of $24,865 versus $20,664 for females. The per capita income for the CDP was $17,671. About 6.5% of families and 7.4% of the population were below the poverty line, including 9.1% of those under age 18 and none of those age 65 or over.

== Education ==
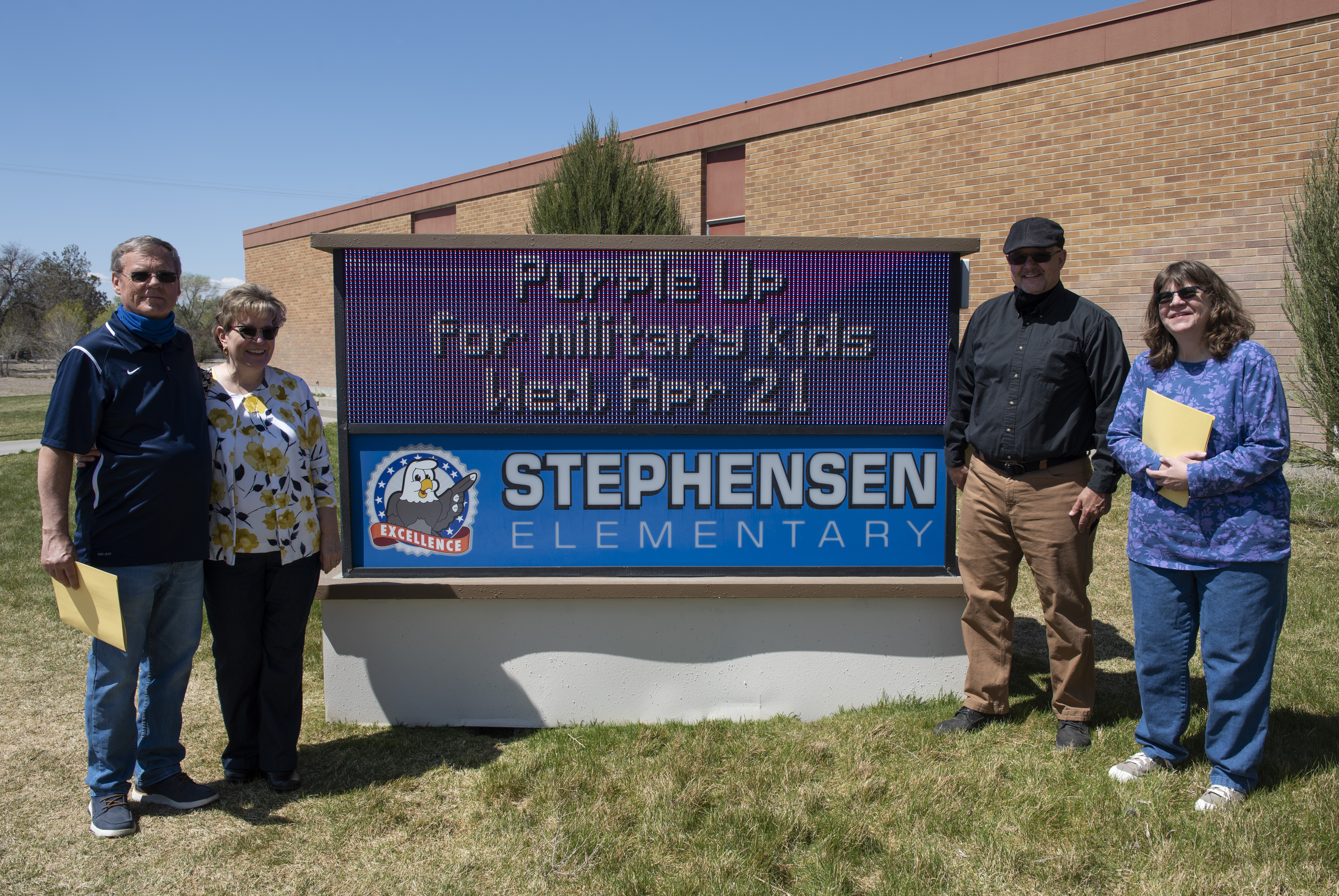
Stephenson Elementary School

Mountain Home School District 193 operates Stephenson Elementary School (grades Pre-Kindergarten to Grade 4) on-post. The onward upper elementary and secondary schools are Hacker Middle School (grades 5–6), Mountain Home Junior High School (grades 7–8), and Mountain Home High School (grades 9–12).

The elementary school, in 2014, was renamed after Mark L. Stephensen, a USAF colonel based at MHAFB who, in April 1967, went missing while on his military duties. The school's previous name was Mountain Home Air Force Base Primary School. In 2026 Mike Simpson, a member of Congress, lobbied to have $6,409,000 in federal funding for a new building.

There are no Department of Defense Education Activity (DoDEA) schools on-post.

== See also ==
- Idaho World War II Army Airfields
- Fighter Wing: A Guided Tour of an Air Force Combat Wing – by Tom Clancy
