= Mountain Home High School (Idaho) =

Location
- 300 South 11th East; Mountain Home, Idaho; United States; 43.130°N 115.685°W

Information
- Type: Public high school
- Established: prior to 1901; 1954 (current)
- School district: Mtn. Home S.D. (#193)
- Principal: Mark Cotton
- Faculty: 53.01 (FTE)
- Grades: 9–12
- Enrollment: 894 (2023-2024)
- Student to teacher ratio: 16.86
- Colors: Orange & Black
- Athletics: IHSAA Class 4A
- Athletics conference: Great Basin Conference
- Mascot: Tiger
- Newspaper: Tiger Tribune
- Yearbook: The Prophet
- Feeder schools: Mountain HomeJunior High (7–8)
- Elevation: 3,130 ft (950 m) AMSL
- Website: Mountain Home HS

Mountain Home High School is a public high school in Mountain Home, Idaho, United States. The only traditional high school of the Mountain Home School District (#193). It serves over 1,100 students in grades 9–12, from the city of Mountain Home and Mountain Home Air Force Base to the southwest. MHHS is located at 300 South 11th East, and the principal is Sam Gunderson.

The current building opened in 1954, with several additions, the latest in 2009. Previous buildings at other sites were built in 1926, 1905, and earlier, as yearbooks indicate MHHS graduates back to 1901. A three-year senior high school (10–12) for decades, freshman returned to the MHHS campus in 2009. The school colors are orange and black and the mascot is a tiger. The MHHS athletic teams compete in the Great Basin Conference (GBC) in IHSAA Class 4A, the state's second-highest enrollment classification (160–319 students per class year).

MHHS is the largest high school in Elmore County, which includes Glenns Ferry, which competes in 2A (with a 1A enrollment).

In 1980 a referendum to add a locker room for girls and a cafeteria passed with 918 in favor and 233 against, with 73% of voters in favor. The bond value was $900,000.

== State titles ==
Girls

- Softball (2): (4A) 2009, 2010 (introduced in 1997)
