= 391st Fighter Squadron =

Active US Air Force unit

391st Fighter Squadron

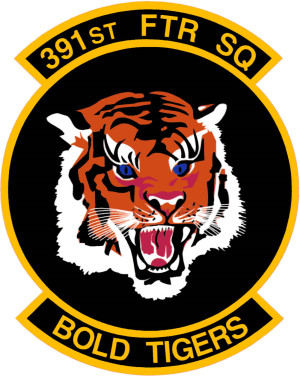
- 391st Fighter Squadron insignia
- Active: 1943–1946; 1953–1959; 1962–1971; 1971–1990; 1992–present
- Country: United States
- Branch: United States Air Force
- Role: Fighter
- Part of: Air Combat Command
- Garrison/HQ: Mountain Home Air Force Base
- Nickname: Bold Tigers
- Motto: Fortune Favors the Bold...Tigers
- Engagements: European Theater of Operations; Vietnam War; Global War on Terrorism; Operation Epic Fury
- Decorations: Distinguished Unit Citation; Air Force Outstanding Unit Award with Combat "V" Device; Belgian Fourragère; Republic of Vietnam Gallantry Cross with Palm

Commanders
- Current commander: Lt Col Chris "Phantom" Leonard

Insignia
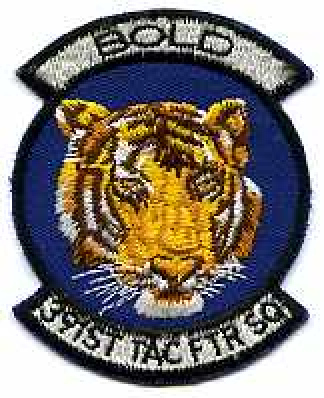
- Patch with 391st Tactical Fighter Squadron emblem (approved 21 March 1978)

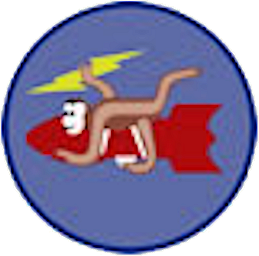
- 391st Fighter-Bomber Squadron emblem (approved 24 September 1954)

The 391st Fighter Squadron is part of the 366th Fighter Wing at Mountain Home Air Force Base, Idaho. The squadron participated in combat missions in World War II and the Vietnam War, provided air defense in Korea and Japan from 1968 to 1971, and continues to provide tactical air command for the United States Air Force. It currently operates McDonnell Douglas F-15E Strike Eagle aircraft, conducting close air support missions.

== History ==
=== World War II ===
The 391st flew combat missions in the European Theater of Operations from 14 March 1944 to 3 May 1945.

=== Vietnam War ===
The squadron flew in combat in Southeast Asia from 2 February 1966 to 21 July 1968.

=== Pacific air defense ===
It provided air defense in Korea and Japan from 22 July 1968 to 14 February 1971.

=== 2013 sequestration ===
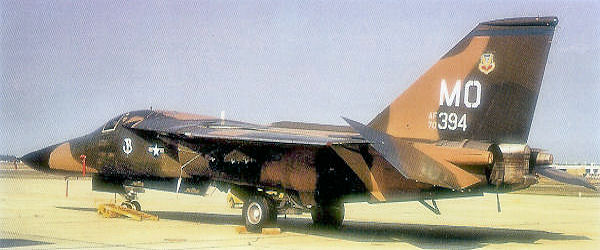
Squadron F-111F (Note: Aircraft is General Dynamics F-111F Aardvark, serial 70-2394, taken on 16 September 1972.)

Air Combat Command officials announced a stand down and reallocation of flying hours for the rest of the fiscal year 2013 due to mandatory budget cuts. The across-the-board spending cuts, called sequestration, took effect 1 March when Congress failed to agree on a deficit-reduction plan.

Squadrons either stood down on a rotating basis or kept combat ready or at a reduced readiness level called "basic mission capable" for part or all of the remaining months in fiscal 2013. This affected the 391st Fighter Squadron with a stand-down grounding from 9 April-30 September 2013.

== Lineage ==
- Constituted as the 391st Fighter Squadron (Single-Engine) on 24 May 1943

Activated on 1 June 1943
Redesignated 391st Fighter Squadron, Single-Engine on 20 August 1943
Inactivated on 20 August 1946

- Redesignated 391st Fighter-Bomber Squadron on 15 November 1952

Activated on 1 January 1953
Redesignated 391st Tactical Fighter Squadron on 1 July 1958
Inactivated on 1 April 1959

- Activated on 30 April 1962 (not organized)

Organized on 8 May 1962
Inactivated on 28 February 1971

- Activated on 1 July 1971

Inactivated on 1 July 1990

- Redesignated 391st Fighter Squadron on 1 March 1992

Activated on 11 March 1992

=== Assignments ===
- 366th Fighter Group: 1 June 1943 – 20 August 1946
- 366th Fighter-Bomber Group: 1 January 1953 (attached to 21st Fighter-Bomber Wing 6 December 1956 – 11 June 1957)
- 366th Fighter-Bomber Wing (later 366th Tactical Fighter Wing): 25 September 1957 – 1 April 1959
- United States Air Forces in Europe: 30 April 1962 (not organized)
- 366th Tactical Fighter Wing: 8 May 1962
- 2d Air Division, 26 January 1966 (attached to 12th Tactical Fighter Wing)
- Seventh Air Force, 1 April 1966 (remained attached to 12 Tactical Fighter Wing)
- 12th Tactical Fighter Wing, 23 June 1966
- 475th Tactical Fighter Wing, 22 July 1968 – 28 February 1971
- 347th Tactical Fighter Wing, 1 July 1972
- 366th Tactical Fighter Wing (later 366th Fighter Wing: 31 October 1972 – 1 July 1990
- 366th Operations Group, 11 March 1992 – present

=== Stations ===
- Richmond Army Air Base, Virginia, 1 June 1943
- Bluethenthal Field, North Carolina, 9 August 1943
- Richmond Army Air Base, Virginia, 6 November 1943 – 17 December 1943
- RAF Membury, England, 12 January 1944
- RAF Thruxton, England, 1 March 1944
- Saint-Pierre-du-Mont Airfield, France, 20 June 1944
- Dreux - Vernouillet Airport, France, 24 August 1944
- Laon-Couvron Air Base, France, 7 September 1944
- Asch Airfield, Belgium, 26 November 1944
- Münster-Handorf Airfield, Germany, 21 April 1945
- Bayreuth-Bindlach Airfield, Germany, c. 25 June 1945
- Fritzlar Air Base, Germany, 11 September 1945 – 20 August 1946
- Alexandria Air Force Base (later England Air Force Base), Louisiana, 1 January 1953 – 1 April 1959

Deployed to Aviano Air Base, Italy, 6 December 1956 – 11 June 1957

- Etain-Rouvres Air Base, France, 30 April 1962
- Holloman Air Force Base, New Mexico, 12 June 1963
- Cam Ranh Air Base, South Vietnam, 29 January 1966
- Misawa Air Base, Japan, 22 July 1968 – 28 February 1971

Deployed to:

Taegu Air Base, South Korea, 22 July–7 October 1968, 7 February–5 March 1969, 1 May–2 June 1969, 1–30 August 1969, 1–15 February 1970, 15–29 March 1970)
Kunsan Air Base, South Korea, 26 April–10 May 1970, 7–21 June 1970, 30 August–12 September 1970, 4–18 October 1970, 1–15 November 1970, 13–19 December 1970, 1–15 February 1971)

- Mountain Home Air Force Base, Idaho, 1 July 1971 – 1 July 1990
- Mountain Home Air Force Base, Idaho, 11 March 1992 – present

=== Aircraft ===
- Republic P-47 Thunderbolt (1943–1946)
- North American P-51 Mustang (1953)
- North American F-86 Sabre (1953–1955)
- Republic F-84 Thunderjet (1954–1958)
- Republic F-84F Thunderstreak (1962–1965)
- North American F-100 Super Sabre (1957–1959)
- McDonnell F-4 Phantom II (1965–1971)
- General Dynamics F-111 Aardvark (1971–1990)
- McDonnell Douglas F-15E Strike Eagle (1992–present)
