= Mountain Home Junior High =

Coordinates: 43.12788°N 115.68036°W

Mountain Home Junior High School

Location
- 1600 East 2nd Street; Mountain Home, Idaho; U.S.

Information
- Type: Public
- School district: Mountain Home S.D. (#193)
- Staff: 29.80 (FTE)
- Grades: 7 and 8
- Enrollment: 608 (2018–19)
- Student to teacher ratio: 20.40
- Color(s): Orange & Black
- Mascot: Tiger

Mountain Home Junior High School is a three-year public junior high in Mountain Home, Idaho. It is the only traditional junior high school in the Mountain Home School District (#193). It serves around 1,000 students in grades 7 and 8 in Mountain Home and the surrounding area. It is located at 1600 East 2nd Street in Mountain Home, Idaho.
