= Tonopah Air Force Base =

Former US Air Force base in Nye County, Nevada, US

Tonopah Air Force Base
- Part of Fourth Air Force
- Nye County, near Tonopah, Nevada
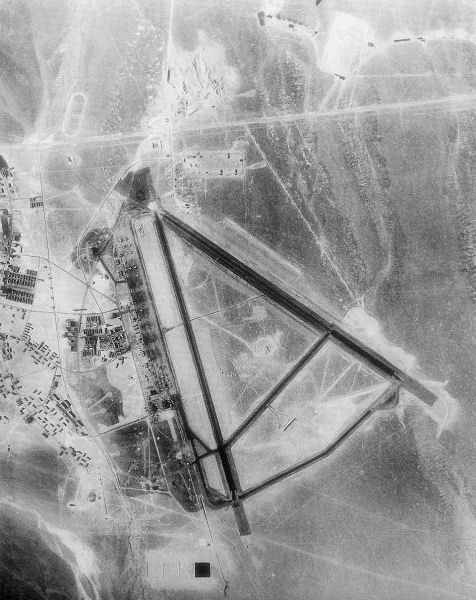
- 1944 Tonopah AAFld after a $3,000,000 project was completed for runways, new aprons, new water storage tanks, additional quarters and barracks, a new post exchange, supply buildings, crash stations, warehouses, operations buildings, a hangar, a school building, and range facilities. Most construction was complete by the beginning of November 1943. World War II newspaper: Desert Bomber

Site information
- Type: air base
- Code: 2096585 (GNIS); NV99799F603300 (FFID); J09NV0969 (FUDS)
- Controlled by: 413th Army Air Force Base Unit
- Condition: municipal airport

Location
- Coordinates: 38°03′19″N 117°05′19″W

Tonopah Air Force Base (Tonopah Army Air Field in World War II) is a Formerly Used Defense Site (FUDS) in the USA that was a Tonopah Basin military installation until shortly after it was designated an Air Force Base in 1948. Two of the runways still in use are maintained by Nye County, Nevada; and World War II building foundations and three hangars of the base remain at the municipal Tonopah Airport.

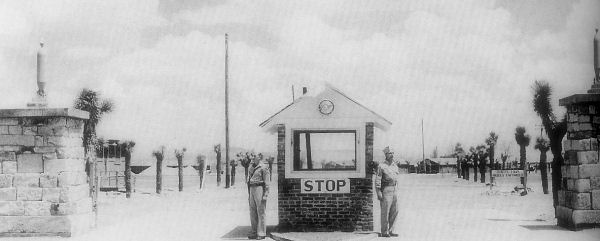
Main gate at Tonopah AAF, 1944.

== Background ==
The Tonopah Mining District (38°07′29″N 117°15′02″W with Tonopah Manhattan Stage Route (38°04′06″N 117°10′03″W) was an area of the 1900-1921 silver rush, and in September 1939, GHQ Air Force considered improving the airdrome at Tonopah. After World War I, Nevada and other western inland states were surveyed by Capt. Lowell H. Smith and Sgt. William B. Whitefield for landing sites, and by "mid-1925 the Air Service possessed information on nearly thirty-five hundred landing places, including more than twenty-eight hundred emergency landing areas, in the United States." The 1929 McCarran Field north of Las Vegas was used by the Army Air Corps for 1930s training flights. After the 1939 Invasion of Poland, the "western site board" had located a southern Nevada area "near Tonopah, Nev" by April 1940 for a military range, and in October 1940, Air Corps Major David Schlatter surveyed the southwest United States for a military airfield. "The 60 x 90 mile area at Tonopah was transferred to the War Department on 29 October 1940" by Executive Order 8578. The 1940 Tonopah Airport Committee was formed by the community to have an airstrip built and although use of the range was delayed until December 1941, the Civil Aeronautics Administration sponsored 1940 construction on a new airfield financed in part by the Works Progress Administration—the 79th Air Base Gp (adv det) became Las Vegas Army Airfield's 1st base operating unit on 17 June 1941, and its Air Corps Gunnery School began on 16 June.

== Range and base operations ==
The Bombing and Gunnery Range Detachment was "the first organization to arrive at what [became] the Tonopah Army Air Field" after activating "1 July 1942 at Muroc Lake, California" (the commander, Lt. Col. F.D. Gore arrived 2 July.) Ready for occupancy in July, the airbase included runways, barracks, mess halls and a hospital when finally occupied and when opened, was a sub-base of March Field. "The 2043rd and 2044th Quartermaster companies (colored) were activated at this field on 1 October 1942...and departed on 15 January 1943. The 1799th Ordnance Company was activated at this field on 1 December 1942 and departed for Santa Maria, California on 15 January 1943. Likewise, the 1404th Quartermaster Company was activated...and left for overseas the first part of May 1943. The 402nd Service Squadron was activated on this field on 6 January 1943 and departed on 2 September for POE." In June 1944, Col. Patteson assumed command from Col Jacob W. McCrillis who had succeeded Gore in December 1941 (Lt Col Albert V. Walter was the December 1944 commander when a B-24 crashed).

== Training ==
Through 31 November 1943, Tonopah AAF "aided in the training of 8 bombardment squadrons and 12 fighter squadrons." The first planes to arrive were Bell P-39 Airacobra training fighters and by the beginning of 1943 there were 227 officers and 1,779 enlisted men at the field (e.g., of the 75th and 390th Bombardment Squadrons.) The 255th, 353rd and 356th squadrons of the 354th Fighter Group arrived on January 18, 1943 and left at the beginning of March when squadrons of the 357th Fighter Group arrived. Tonopah crashes included those due to P-39 engine limitations at the airfield's altitude and temperatures. In June 1943, a B-24 group transferred to Tonopah from Mountain Home Army Airfield.

World War II Nevada military sites included Army Airfields (red) such as Tonopah and Army/Navy ranges. (Orange indicates the 5 Tonopah auxiliary fields, e.g., #5 is the Mellan Airstrip.)

In September 1943 the base was shut down to expand for Consolidated B-24 Liberator training. By October 1943, about half of the personnel were moved temporarily to Bishop Army Air Field, California, in order to provide housing at Tonopah for construction contractors on a $3,000,000 project. Most construction was complete by the beginning of November 1943, and training facilities included a rifle range, pistol range, skeet ranges, turret trainers, bomb trainers equipped with Norden or Sperry sights, flexible gunnery trainers, navigation trainers, and schools for gunners and radio operators. Personnel at Bishop returned on November 1, 1943, and the 458th Bombardment Group arrived for training. When the 458th departed in January 1944, the 470th Bombardment Group arrived at Tonopah as a B-24 replacement training unit. In a March 31, 1944, reorganization the 470th was disbanded and its training functions being taken over by the 442nd Army Air Force Base Unit.

In the summer of 1944, a Field Test Unit of Wright Field's Special Weapons Branch* tested guided bombs (e.g., GB-4, GB-6 and the GB-8). The post exchange that had opened in August 1942 paid a 13 November 1943 dividend of $10,741.48, and the base's large bakery during 1943 and 1944 sold an average of 400 dozen doughnuts a day (a flightline doughnut shop opened in March 1945. In October, 1944, there were 66 B-24 aircraft available for the training program and there were 1,264 officers and 5,273 enlisted men assigned to the base (437 officers, 3,707 enlisted men, and 184 civilians by March 1945).

Accidents associated with the base included an April 1944 crash near the field and a 19 August 1944 B-24 training mission crash at the airfield. In 1945, five corporals at Tonopah developed a three-story tower trainer for gunnery crews to simulate firing at four simultaneous combat movies with "electric-eye ammunition".

== Post-war ==
On 23 August 1945, the Fourth Air Force placed the Tonopah AAFld on inactive status, all training classes were stopped on August 26, and combat crew flight training was stopped soon after. By September 15 just four aircraft remained at the airfield, on October 15 the 442nd AAF Base Unit was discontinued and the field was made a sub-base of Hamilton Field, California, and on October 16 the War Department requested the Nevada World War II Army Airfield be retained.

On 21 March 1946, Tonopah was a sub-base of Castle Field and transferred with Castle to Strategic Air Command—by August 1946, there were just a few assigned personnel at the airfield. On 1 October 1946 after jurisdiction transferred to Clovis Army Air Field, the Tonopah sub-base was "satellited on the 200th Army Air Forces Base Unit (AAFBU), Colorado Springs, Colorado". In June 1947 Tonopah AAF was declared excess along with its 3 auxiliary areas (Mizpah & Butler housing terraces and Columbia Junction gasoline unloading station). In June 1948 the "Tonopah Bombing and Gunnery Range [transferred] from the Fifteenth Air Force to the Flying Division", and Tonopah Air Force Base transferred to the "Corps of Engineers" on 21 August as surplus, and was later turned over to the town of Tonopah as the Tonopah Airport, which occasionally has USAF or Department of Energy traffic. An open house was held on August 1 and by August 16, "large quantities" of house furnishings from Tonopah Air Force Base were arriving at Spokane Air Force Base.

External image
- Current photos

A 1949 ordnance disposal team cleared "all lands within the Tonopah Air Force Base Gunnery Range, located approximately seven (7) miles east of Tonopah, Nevada", and those "Tonopah Army Airfield Practice Bombing Ranges" (NV9799F9893 / J09NV1112, 38°1′29″N 117°8′8″W) were subsequently designated FUDS. In addition to the AFB and the Tonopah Bombing Range (FUDS), by 2002 the Tonopah Rifle Range (NV99799F603400) and the "Tonopah AFB Beacon Site Nos. 1-7"(NV9799F6031 / J09NV096738, 38°13′45″N 117°7′22″W) were also designated FUDS.
