= 48th Bombardment Squadron =

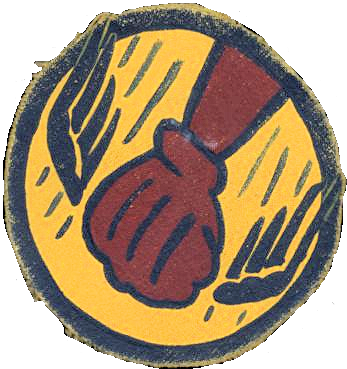
- Active: 1940-1946
- Country: United States
- Branch: United States Army Air Forces
- Type: Bombardment

The 48th Bombardment Squadron is an inactive United States Air Force unit. Its last assignment was with the 41st Bombardment Group, based at Manila, Philippines. It was inactivated on 27 January 1946.

== History ==
Activated at March Field, California in early 1941 as part of the prewar mobilization of the Army Air Corps. Equipped with B-18 Bolos and Lockheed Hudsons. Engaged in coastal patrols over Southern California, later over the San Francisco area.

Re-equipped with B-25 Medium bombers, deployed to Seventh Air Force in Hawaii during the late summer of 1942. Completed final training in Hawaii and moved to Tarawa in the Central Pacific in December 1943. Entered combat and attacked enemy installations, airfields, and shipping in the Marshall Islands in preparation for the invasion by US forces, and after February 1944 staged through captured fields on Eniwetok to attack shipping in the Caroline Islands.

In April 1944 moved to Makin where its missions were directed primarily against shipping and bypassed islands in the Marshalls and Carolines. Returned to Hawaii in October 1944 for training with rockets and new B-25's. Moved to Okinawa, May–June 1945. Bombed airfields, railways, and harbor facilities on Kyushu until August 1945. Also flew some missions against airfields in China.

Moved to Manila in December 1945. Inactivated in the Philippines on 27 January 1946.

=== Lineage ===
- Constituted 48th Bombardment Squadron (Medium) on 20 November 1940

Activated on 15 January 1941.
Inactivated on 27 January 1946.

=== Assignments ===
- 41st Bombardment Group, 15 January 1941 – 27 January 1946

=== Stations ===
- March Field, California, 15 January 1941
- Davis-Monthan Army Airfield, Arizona, 16 May 1941
- Muroc Army Airfield, California, 10 December 1941
- Visalia Army Airfield, California, 5 February 1942
- Bakersfield-Kern County MAP, California, 9 January 1942
- NAS Alameda, California, 2 July 1942
- Hammer Field, California, 1 December 1942 – 29 September 1943
- Hickam Field, Territory of Hawaii, 20 October 1943
- Abemama Airfield, Abemama, Gilbert Islands, 22 December 1943
- Makin Airfield, Makin, Gilbert Islands, 21 April 1944

Operated from: East Field, Saipan, Mariana Islands, 23 July-21 August 1944

- Wheeler Field, Territory of Hawaii, 14 October 1944
- Yontan Airfield, Okinawa, 7 June 1945
- Fort William McKinley, Philippines, 13 December 1945 – 27 January 1946.

=== Aircraft ===
- B-18 Bolo, 1941
- Lockheed Hudson, 1941–1942
- B-25 Mitchell, 1942-1945.
