= 72nd Fighter Squadron =

72nd Tactical Fighter Squadron
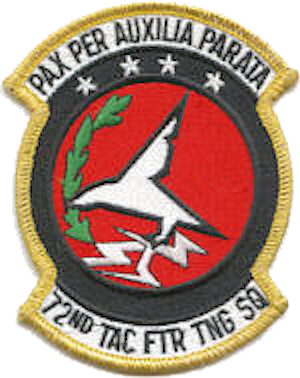
- Emblem of the Tactical Fighter Training Squadron
- Active: 1941-1992
- Country: United States
- Branch: United States Army Air Forces
- Role: Fighter
- Nickname: Falcons
- Motto: PAX PER AUXILIA PARATA "Peace through Readiness"
- Engagements: WWII

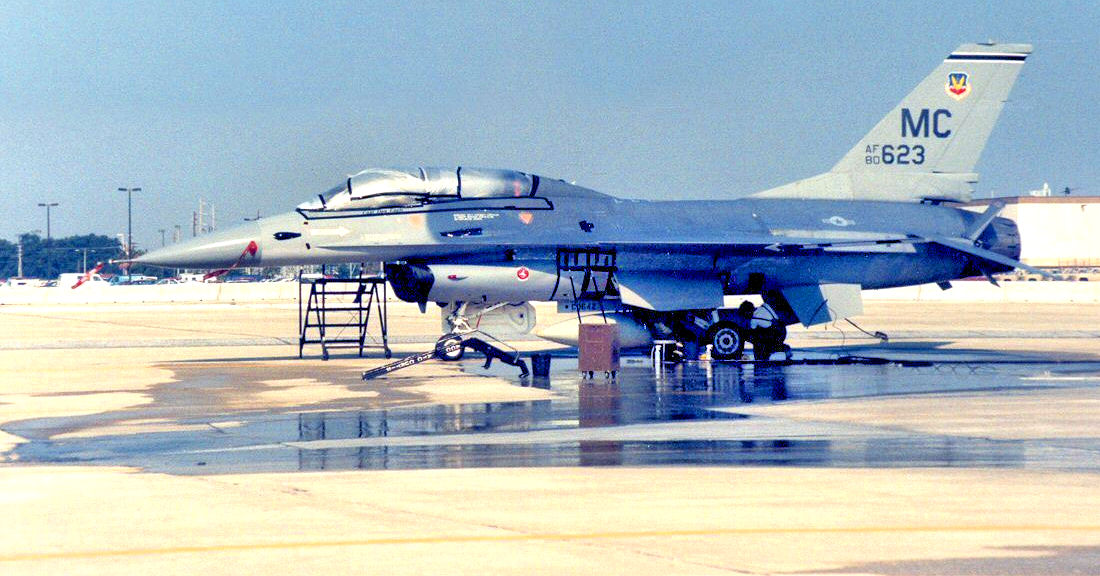
72nd TFTS F-16B Block 10B Fighting Falcon 80-0623

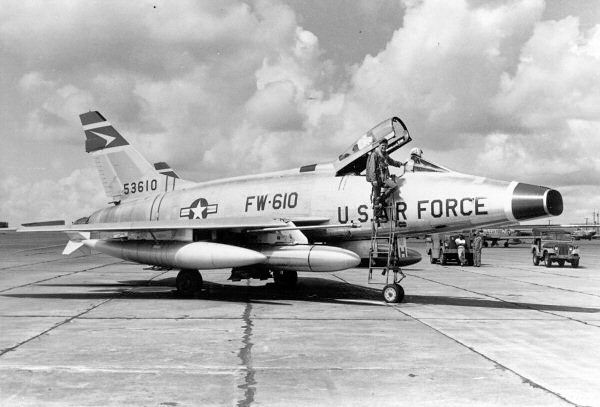
72nd TFS F-100D 55-3610 at Clark AB, 1958

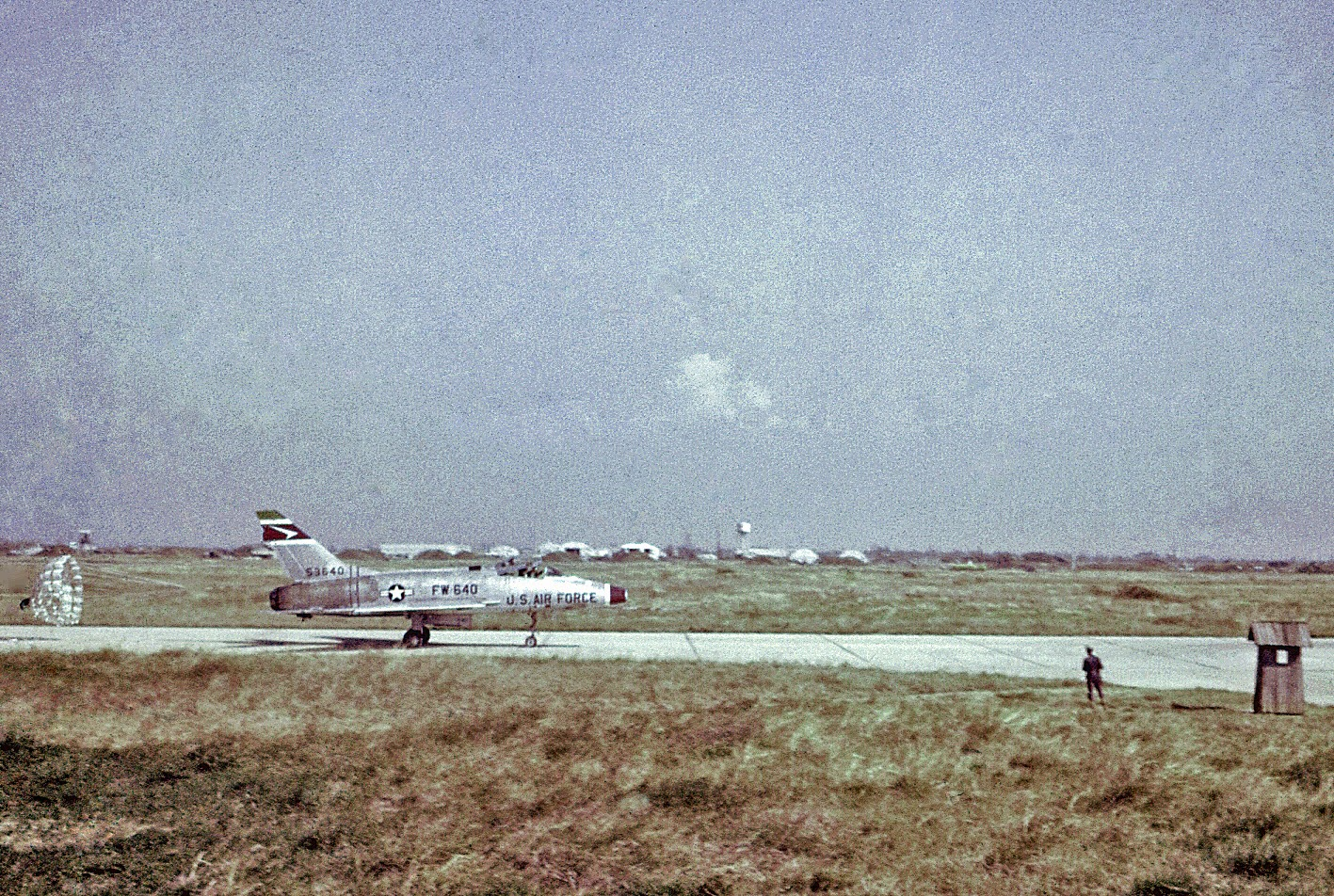
72nd TFS F-100D 55-3640 at Chiayi AB, Taiwan, 1958

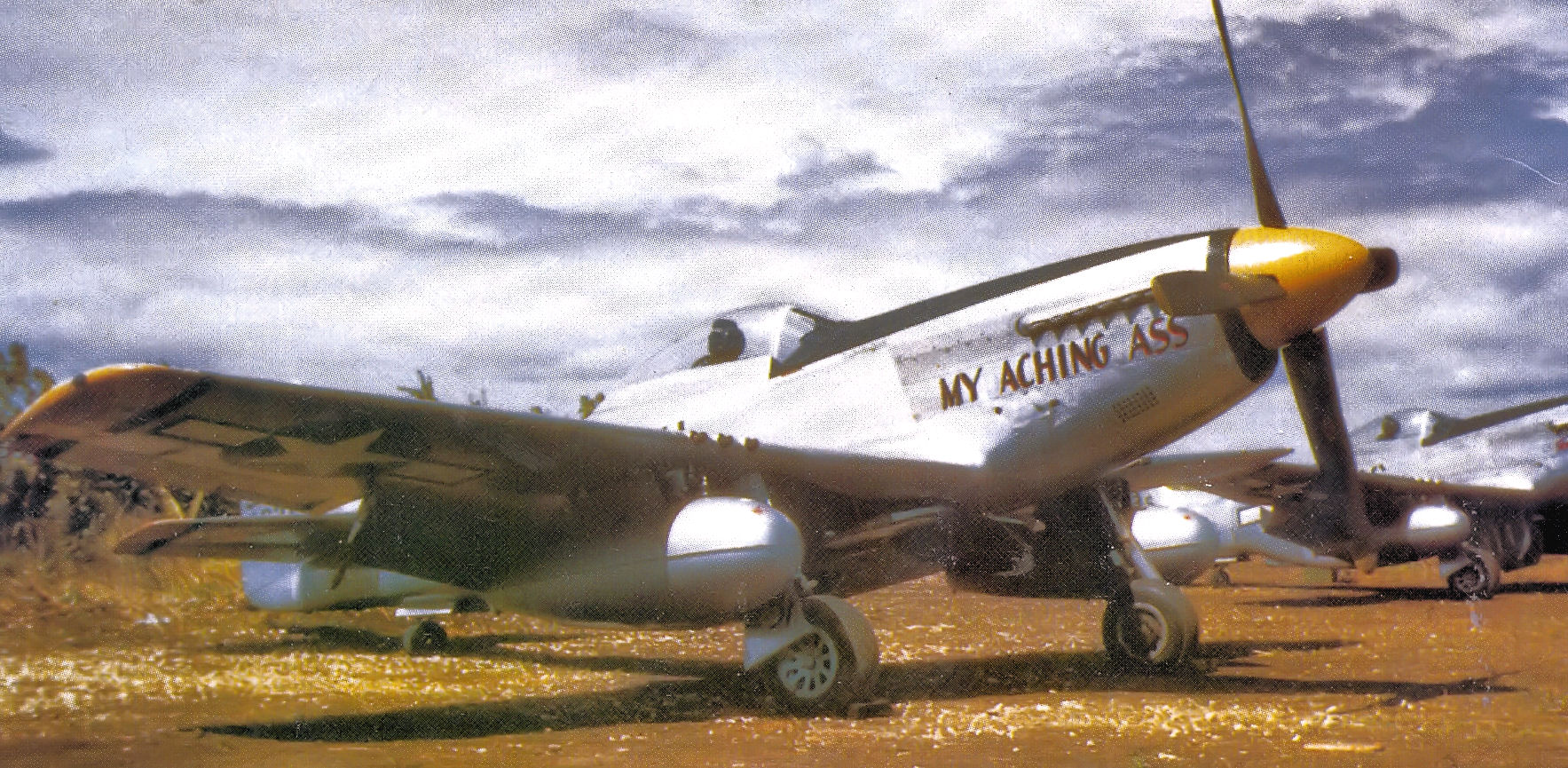
72nd Fighter Squadron P-51D Mustang, North Field, Iwo Jima, 1945.

The 72nd Fighter Squadron is an inactive United States Air Force unit. Its last assignment was with the 56th Operations Group, based at MacDill Air Force Base, Florida. It was inactivated on 19 June 1992.

== History ==
=== World War II ===
Established as a defensive interceptor squadron for Hawaii in late 1941. Suffered tremendous casualties and aircraft losses at Wheeler Field during the Pearl Harbor Attack. Re-equipped and used as Seventh Air Force training unit; also flew reconnaissance patrols over Hawaii until late 1943.

Deployed to Central Pacific as part of Seventh Air Force island hopping campaign against Japanese in late 1943. Flew combat missions from Makin Island using P-39 Airacobra fighters until April 1944, returning to Hawaii and being re-equipped and trained with long-range P-51 Mustangs. Re-deployed to Western Pacific, being stationed on Iwo Jima while battle for the island was still ongoing and engaged in long-range B-29 Superfortress escort missions over Japan; continuing that mission until the end of hostilities in August 1945. Reassigned to Mariana Islands, as a Far East Air Force fighter squadron, inactivated 1946.

=== Cold War ===
Reactivated as Tactical Air Command F-86 jet tactical fighter squadron, 1952 Deployed to France in 1954 as part of NATO; re-equipped with the F-100 Super Sabre 1957. Ordered out of France by host government as part of France's rejection of NATO's nuclear weapons policy. Reassigned to Philippines in 1958 for air defense of Luzon. Inactivated 1959 as a result of budget reductions. Equipment reassigned to 510th Tactical Fighter Squadron.

=== Pilot training ===
Reactivated 1 July 1982 at MacDill AFB, Florida as an F-16A/B Block 10 Fighting Falcon Replacement Training Unit Squadron, replacing the 13th Tactical Fighter Training Squadron when the 58th TFTS transitioned from F-4 Phantom IIs. Tail coded "MC", black tail stripe outlined in white. Upgraded to the Block 25 and 30 F-16C/D in March 1990 and continued as a Replacement Training Unit. Inactivated in 1992 as part of the BRAC realignment of MacDill AFB.

=== Lineage ===
- Constituted 72nd Pursuit Squadron (Interceptor) on 4 October 1941

Activated on 5 October 1941
Re-designated 72nd Fighter Squadron on 15 May 1942
Inactivated on 10 October 1946

- Redesignated 72nd Fighter-Bomber Squadron on 15 November 1952

Activated on 1 January 1953
Inactivated on 8 February 1958

- Re-designated 72nd Tactical Fighter Squadron on 19 May 1958

Activated on 1 July 1958
Inactivated on 9 April 1959

- Re-designated 72nd Tactical Fighter Training Squadron, and activated on 1 July 1982

Re-designated 72nd Fighter Squadron on 1 November 1991
Inactivated on 19 June 1992

=== Assignments ===
- 15th Pursuit (later Fighter) Group, 5 October 1941
- 318th Fighter Group, 15 October 1942
- 21st Fighter Group, 15 June 1944 – 10 October 1946
- 21st Fighter-Bomber Group, 1 January 1953 – 8 February 1958
- 6200th Air Base Wing, 1 July 1958 – 9 April 1959.
- 56th Tactical Training Wing, 1 July 1992
- 56th Operations Group, 1 November 1991 – 19 June 1992

=== Stations ===
- Wheeler Field, Hawaii Territory, 5 October 1941
- Hilo Field, Hawaii Territory, 25 July 1943
- Wheeler Field, Hawaii Territory, 21 October 1943
- Makin Airfield, Gilbert Islands, 18 December 1943
- Haleiwa Fighter Strip, Hawaii Territory, 23 April 1944
- Mokuleia Field, Hawaii Territory, 8 June 1944
- Central Field, Iwo Jima, 26 March 1945
- South Field, Iwo Jima, 15 July 1945
- Isley Airfield, Saipan, 5 December 1945
- Northwest Field, Guam, 17 April-10 October 1946
- George AFB, California, 1 January 1953 – 26 November 1954
- Châteauroux-Déols Air Base, France, 14 December 1954
- Chambley-Bussières Air Base, France, 9 July 1955 – 8 February 1958
- Clark AB, Luzon, Philippines, 1 July 1958 – 9 April 1959.
- MacDill AFB, Florida, 1 July 1982 – 19 June 1992

=== Aircraft ===
- P-40 Warhawk, 1941–1943
- P-39 Airacobra, 1943–1944
- P-38 Lightning, 1944–1945
- P-51 Mustang, 1944–1946
- P-47 Thunderbolt, 1946
- F-51 Mustang, 1953
- F-86 Sabre, 1953–1957
- F-100 Super Sabre, 1958–1959
- F-16 Fighting Falcon, 1982-1992

=== Emblems ===
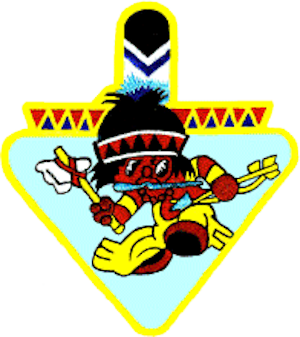
World War II squadron emblem

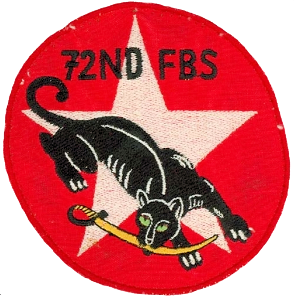
72nd Fighter-Bomber Squadron emblem

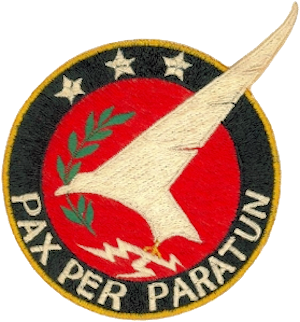
72nd Tactical Fighter Squadron emblem

== Bibliography ==
- Maurer, Maurer, ed. (1982) [1969]. Combat Squadrons of the Air Force, World War II (PDF) (reprint ed.). Washington, DC: Office of Air Force History. ISBN 0-405-12194-6. LCCN 70605402. OCLC 72556. Archived from the original (PDF) on 20 December 2016.
- Martin, Patrick. Tail Code: The Complete History of USAF Tactical Aircraft Tail Code Markings. Schiffer Publishing, 1994. ISBN 0-88740-513-4.
- Rogers, Brian. United States Air Force Unit Designations Since 1978. Hinkley, England: Midland Publications, 2005. ISBN 1-85780-197-0.
