= 820th Bombardment Squadron =

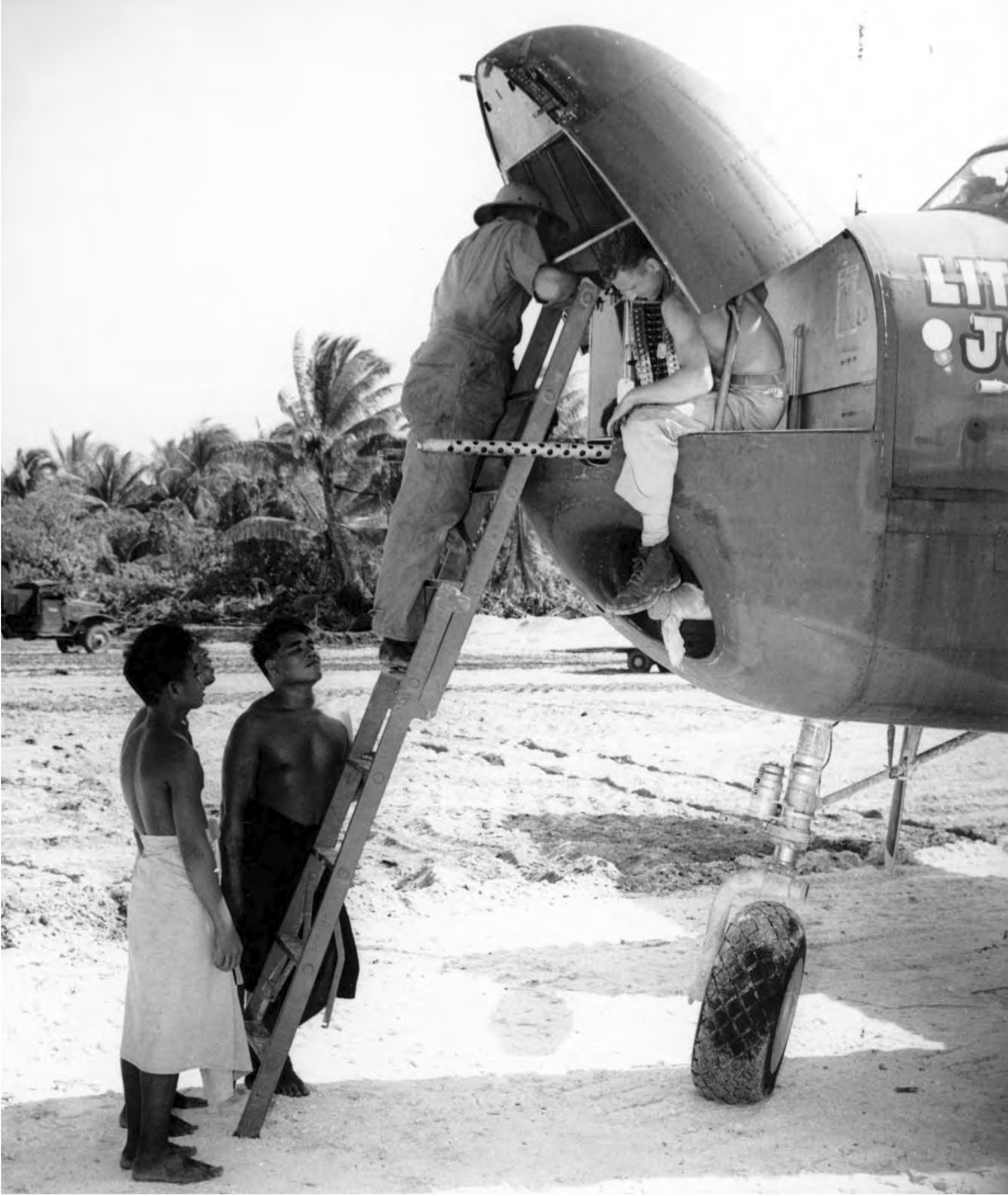
- Armorers place a .50-caliber machine gun in the nose of a 41st Bombardment Group B–25 at Tarawa
- Active: 1942–1946
- Country: United States
- Branch: United States Air Force
- Role: Medium bomber
- Engagements: American Theater Antisubmarine Campaign; Pacific Theater of Operations

Insignia
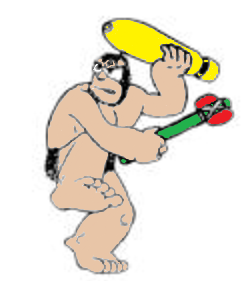
- 820th Bombardment Squadron emblem (Note: Approved 15 May 1943. Description: The caricatured cartoon newspaper figure "Alley Oop" grasping stone club red, green handle, in right hand and hurling a large yellow aerial bomb held aloft in left hand proper)

The 820th Bombardment Squadron is a former Army Air Forces unit, inactivated on 4 January 1946. The squadron was first activated during World War II as the 521st Bombardment Squadron. The squadron was soon engaged in the antisubmarine campaign off the Atlantic coast of the United States as the 16th Antisubmarine Squadron.

After the Navy took over the coastal antisubmarine warfare mission in 1943, the squadron moved to the Pacific coast, where it trained as a medium bomber unit and was redesignated the 820th Bombardment Squadron. It moved to the Pacific and participated in attacks in the Marshall and Caroline Islands. It returned to Hawaii in 1944 for training and reentered combat from Okinawa in 1945. After V-J Day, the squadron returned to the United States and was inactivated.

== History ==
=== Organization and antisubmarine warfare ===
The squadron was first activated at Charleston Army Air Field, South Carolina in October 1942 as the 521st Bombardment Squadron, one of the original squadrons of the 378th Bombardment Group, located at Langley Field, Virginia. The squadron was equipped with a mix of Douglas O-46s and Lockheed B-34s. The squadron mission was to search for German U-boats off the southeast Atlantic coast. Although the Navy was responsible for long range antisubmarine patrolling, it lacked the aircraft to perform the mission and the Army Air Forces (AAF) performed the mission, even though its crews lacked proper training.

In October 1942, the AAF organized its antisubmarine forces into the single Army Air Forces Antisubmarine Command, which established the 25th Antisubmarine Wing the following month to control its forces operating over the Atlantic. Its bombardment group headquarters, including the 378th, were inactivated and the squadron, redesignated the 16th Antisubmarine Squadron in November, was assigned directly to the 25th Wing in December. In July 1943, the AAF and Navy reached an agreement to transfer the coastal antisubmarine mission to the Navy. This mission transfer also included an exchange of AAF long-range bombers equipped for antisubmarine warfare for Navy Consolidated B-24 Liberators without such equipment.

=== Combat in the Pacific ===
In September 1943, the squadron moved to Hammer Field, California. There, it began to train with North American B-25 Mitchells and was assigned to the 41st Bombardment Group and became the 820th Bombardment Squadron. It replaced the 46th Bombardment Squadron, which had been detached from the 41st Group to participate in antisubmarine missions in the Atlantic the previous year. In October, it moved to Hickam Field, Hawaii, where it completed its combat training. It moved to Hawkins Field on Tarawa in the Gilbert Islands in December. There, it entered combat and attacked enemy installations, airfields, and shipping in the Marshall Islands in preparation for the invasion by US forces. After February 1944, the squadron staged through captured fields on Eniwetok to attack shipping in the Caroline Islands. In April, the squadron moved to Makin Airfield, Makin, Gilbert Islands, where its operations were primarily attacks on enemy shipping and on Japanese installations on islands that had been bypassed as American forces moved westward through the Pacific.

In October 1944, the squadron was withdrawn from combat operations and returned to Hawaii, where it began training with rockets at Wheeler Field. At Wheeler, it also received new Mitchell bombers. It completed training in May and left Hawaii for Okinawa, arriving at Yontan Airfield in June. While it flew some missions against airfields in China, it primarily bombed airfields, railways, and harbor facilities on Kyushu until August 1945. After V-J Day, the squadron remained on Okinawa until December 1945. Although the rest of the 41st Group moved to the Philippines, the 820th returned to the United States and was inactivated at the port of embarkation on 4 January 1946.

== Lineage ==
- Constituted as the 521st Bombardment Squadron (Heavy) on 13 October 1942

Activated on 18 October 1942
Redesignated: 16th Antisubmarine Squadron (Heavy) on 29 November 1942
Redesignated: 820th Bombardment Squadron, Medium on 22 September 1943
Inactivated on 4 January 1946

=== Assignments ===
- 378th Bombardment Group, 18 October 1942
- 25th Antisubmarine Wing, 14 December 1942
- 41st Bombardment Group, 11 October 1943 – 4 January 1946

=== Stations ===
- Charleston Army Air Field, South Carolina, 18 October 1942
- Hammer Field, California, 22 September – 5 October 1943
- Hickam Field, Hawaii, 20 October 1943
- Hawkins Field, Tarawa, Gilbert Islands, 24 December 1943
- Makin Airfield, Makin, Gilbert Islands, 21 April 1944
- Wheeler Field, Hawaii, 14 October 1944
- Yontan Airfield, Okinawa, 7 June 1945
- Fort Lawton, Washington, 1–4 January 1946

=== Campaigns ===
Campaign Streamer	Campaign	Dates	Notes
	Antisubmarine	18 October 1942 – 1 August 1943	521st Bombardment Squadron (later 16th Antisubmarine Squadron)
	Air Offensive, Japan	24 December 1943 – 14 October 1944, 7 June 1945 – 2 September 1945	820th Bombardment Squadron
	Eastern Mandates	24 December 1943 – 14 April 1944	820th Bombardment Squadron
	Ryukus	7 June 1945 – 2 July 1945	820th Bombardment Squadron
	Western Pacific	7 June 1945 – 2 September 1945	820th Bombardment Squadron
	China Offensive	7 June 1945 – 2 September 1945	820th Bombardment Squadron

=== Aircraft ===
- Douglas O-46, 1942
- Lockheed B-34 Ventura, 1942–1943
- North American B-25 Mitchell, 1943–1945
