= Seventh Air Force =

US Air Force formation responsible for the Korean region

Seventh Air Force (Air Forces Korea)
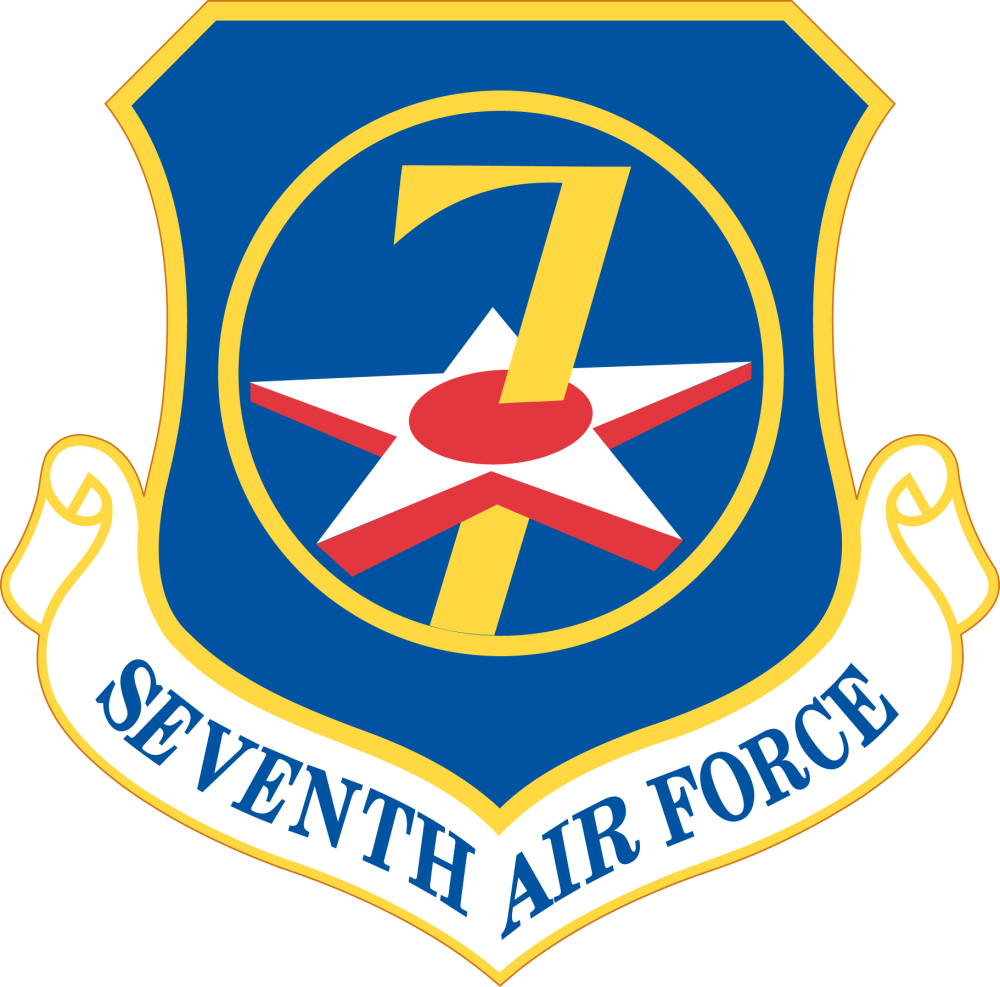
- Shield of the Seventh Air Force
- Active: 18 January 2008 – present (as Seventh Air Force (Air Forces Korea)); 8 September 1986 – 18 January 2008; 28 March 1966 – 30 June 1975; 5 January 1955 – 1 July 1957; 10 December 1954 – 5 January 1955 (as Seventh Air Force); 15 December 1947 – 1 June 1949 (as Pacific Air Command); 18 September 1942 – 15 December 1947 (as Seventh Air Force); 5 February 1942 – 18 September 1942 (as 7 Air Force); 19 October 1940 – 5 February 1942 (Hawaiian Air Command) (85 years, 10 months)
- Country: United States of America
- Branch: United States Air Force (18 September 1947 – present); United States Army ( Army Air Forces, 20 June 1941 – 18 September 1947; Army Air Corps 19 October 1940 – 20 June 1941)
- Type: Numbered Air Force
- Role: Provide combat-ready air forces to U.S. Indo-Pacific Command and U.S. Forces Korea, along with serving as the air component for U.S. Forces Korea and United Nations Command
- Size: 8,300
- Part of: Pacific Air Forces; U.S. Indo-Pacific Command; U.S. Forces Korea; United Nations Command
- Headquarters: Osan Air Base, Gyeonggi Province, Republic of Korea
- Engagements: See list: World War II - Asiatic-Pacific Theater; Central Pacific; Western Pacific Vietnam War; Vietnam Air; Vietnam Air Offensive; Vietnam Air Offensive, Phase II; Vietnam Air Offensive, Phase III; Vietnam Air/Ground; Vietnam Air Offensive, Phase IV; TET 69/Counteroffensive; Vietnam Summer/Fall 1969; Vietnam Winter/Spring; Sanctuary Counteroffensive; Southwest Monsoon; Commando Hunt V; Commando Hunt VI; Commando Hunt VII; Vietnam Ceasefire

- Decorations: See list: Air Force Outstanding Unit Award Republic of Vietnam Gallantry Cross with Palm

Commanders
- Current commander: Lt Gen David G. Shoemaker
- Notable commanders: Frederick L. Martin; Clarence L. Tinker; Lucius D. Clay. William W. Momyer; George S. Brown; Ronald R. Fogleman; Joseph H. Moore

Aircraft flown
- Attack: Fairchild Republic A-10 Thunderbolt II
- Fighter: General Dynamics F-16 Fighting Falcon

The Seventh Air Force (Air Forces Korea) (7 AF) is a Numbered Air Force of the United States Pacific Air Forces (PACAF). It is headquartered at Osan Air Base, South Korea.

The command's mission is to plan and direct air component operations in the Republic of Korea and in the Northwest Pacific.

Established on 19 October 1940 as the Hawaiian Air Force at Fort Shafter, Territory of Hawaii, the 7 AF was a United States Army Air Forces combat unit in the Pacific Theater of World War II, providing air defense of the Hawaiian Islands and engaging in combat operations primarily in the Central Pacific AOR. It was assigned units engaging enemy forces in the Gilbert Islands; Marshall Islands; Caroline Islands; Mariana Islands, and in the last major battle of the Pacific War, the Battle of Okinawa. Returning to its defense role in Hawaii after the war, 7 AF became the primary USAF command and control organization in South Vietnam during the Vietnam War.

7 AF is commanded by Lt Gen David G. Shoemaker. The Vice Commander is Brig Gen Ryan P. Keeney.

== Overview ==
On 8 September 1986, Seventh Air Force was activated at Osan Air Base in South Korea and assumed the mission of maintaining the fragile armistice on the Korean peninsula previously performed by the 314th Air Division.

Since then, both as U.S. Air Forces Korea, under the joint U.S. Forces Korea, and the U.S. Air Force component to the United States and Republic of Korea Combined Forces Command's Air Component Command, 7 AF has been an integral part of deterring aggression from North Korea. It develops the total air campaign and reinforcement plans for ROK defense and sustains mission readiness of 117 operational units and 8,300 U.S. Air Force personnel.

It operates in conjunction with United States Pacific Command (USPACOM), United Nations Command, U.S. Forces, Korea/Combined Forces Command and United States Forces Korea (USFK).

== Units ==
Major units of Seventh Air Force are:

- 51st Fighter Wing, Osan Air Base, South Korea
  (F-16 and A-10 squadrons)
- 8th Fighter Wing, Kunsan Air Base, South Korea
  (F-16C/D)

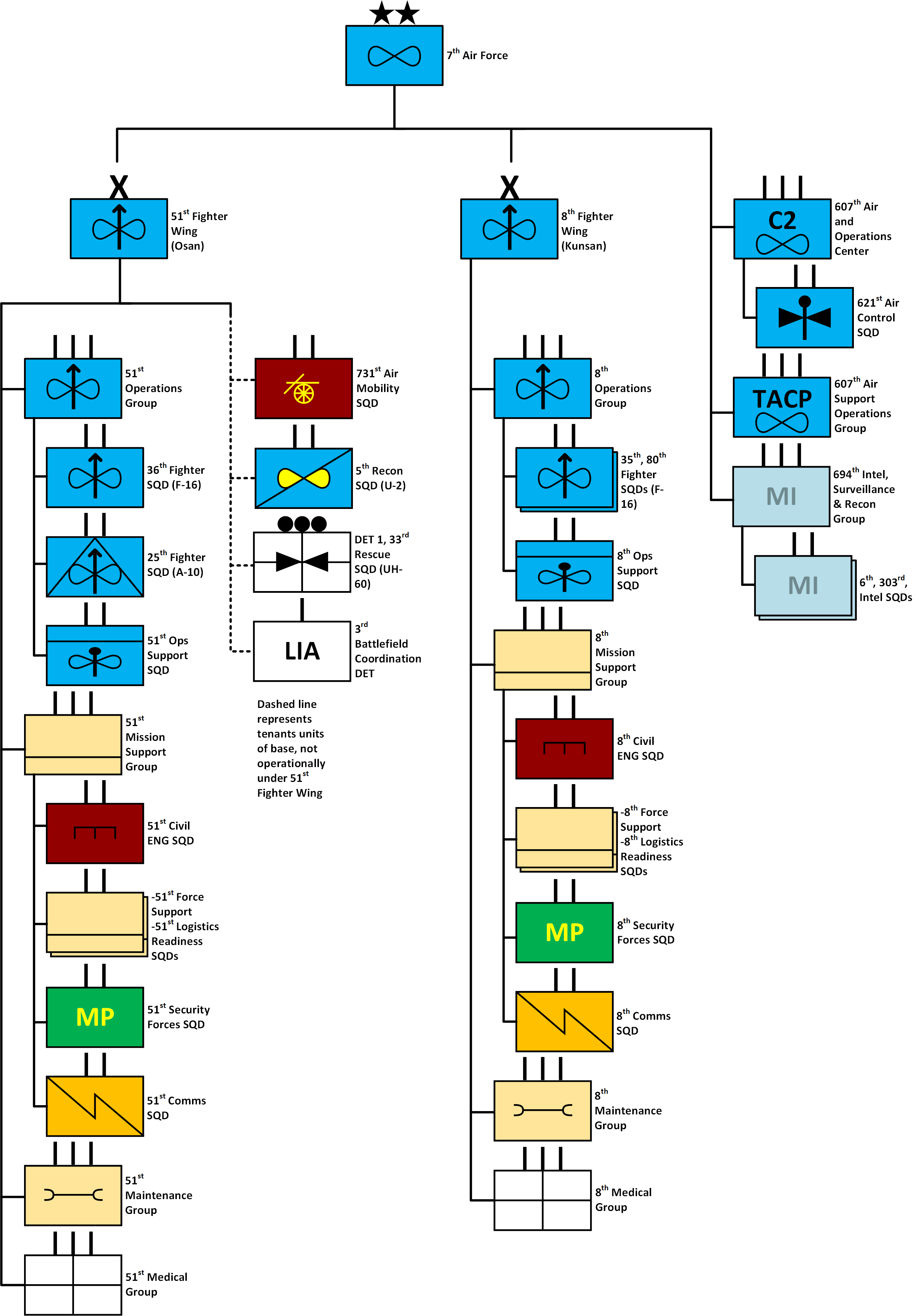
Current organization the U.S. 7th Air Force in South Korea

Non-Flying Units (Osan Air Base)

- 607th Air and Space Operations Center
- 607th Air Support Group
- 607th Air Support Operations Group
- 607th Support Group

== History ==
=== Origins ===
==== Formation of the Hawaiian Air Force ====
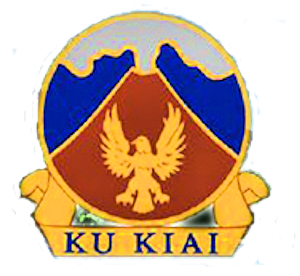

The United States Army Hawaiian Department was established on 6 February 1913, which formally established the presence of the Army in the Territory of Hawaii. The history of the Seventh Air Force can be traced to the arrival of the 6th Aero Squadron, Aviation Section, Army Signal Corps, at Fort Kamehameha, Hawaii on 13 March 1917 under the Air Office, Hawaiian Department, which was established in 1916.

The 6th Aero Squadron consisted of three Curtiss N-9 seaplanes, single-engine biplanes carrying a crew of two, with a top speed of 70 miles an hour. Late in 1917 the U.S. Government purchased Ford Island in Pearl Harbor for use as an airport and by September 1918 the 6th Aero Squadron, by then composed of ten officers and a small group of enlisted men, moved to Ford Island. The airfield established there was named Luke Field, for World War I "balloon buster" Frank Luke, who fell in action in 1918.

The first inter-island flight occurred in February 1919 and by 1920 inter-island flights were used for training purposes. Early in 1920 the 4th Observation Squadron arrived at Luke Field, which was used jointly by the aerial forces of the Army and the Navy. The year 1920 marked a considerable advance in aviation in the islands. The first night flight over Oahu took place on 30 June 1920.

Also, air power began to take its place in the Hawaiian Department's military maneuvers. An aerial photo section joined other air units. The 23d Bombardment Squadron moved to Luke Field from March Field, California on 25 January 1923, and the 72d Bombardment Squadron was activated at Luke on 1 May 1923.

In 1922, Wheeler Field was established south of Schofield Barracks on the main island. The first detachment of twenty men started clearing land for it in February 1922. This field was named for Major Sheldon H. Wheeler, who had assumed command of Luke Field in 1920 and was killed in an air accident in 1921. By June 1923, Wheeler Field boasted six 112' x 200' hangars, three used for housing shops and three others for planes, four other hangars used as warehouses, and oil storage tanks holding 50,000 gallons. Tents and huts housed the men. The first commander of Wheeler Field was Major George E. Stratemeyer, who by 1941 was a brigadier general and Acting Chief of the Army Air Corps.

The first known reforesting by plane was accomplished for the Department of Agriculture by a plane from Wheeler in 1926. The first non-stop Hawaiian flight from Oakland, California to Wheeler Field was made in June 1927 by L.J. Maitland and A.F. Hegenberger. (Navy Commander John Rodgers had set a non-stop seaplane record from San Francisco in 1925 and had fallen short of the mark for Honolulu, landing off the island of Kauai).

During the period from 1917 to 1931, the military air component in Hawaii grew to seven tactical squadrons and two service squadrons. In 1931 the 18th Composite Wing was activated with headquarters at Fort Shafter, and was combined with the Air Office of the Hawaiian Department. The Hawaiian Air Depot was based at Luke Field.

About this time, the Navy decided it would need to use the whole of Ford Island, displacing Luke Field. So the Army bought land adjacent to Pearl Harbor near Fort Kamehameha for a new airfield. The land was purchased on 20 February 1935 from Faxon Bishop et al. for US$1,091,239.

Hickam Field was dedicated on 31 May 1935, named for Lt. Colonel Horace M. Hickam, C.O. 3rd Attack Group, killed 5 November 1934 at Fort Crockett, Texas. The first detachment of 12 men (the 31st Bomb Squadron) arrived at Hickam on 1 September 1937 and was housed in tents. In September 1938, when the base was officially activated, the Hawaiian Air Depot began its move from Luke Field. The move was completed on 31 October 1940.

On 1 November 1940, the Hawaiian Air Force was established as a part of the general United States Army Air Corps expansion program of 1939/1940. It was organized and activated with headquarters at Fort Shafter (the first Army Air Force outside the continental United States), moving to Hickam in July 1941. It consisted of two air base commands:

- 18th Bombardment Wing (formerly 18th Composite Wing) (B-10's) at Hickam Field.
- 14th Pursuit Wing, activated on 1 November 1940 (P-26's) at Wheeler Field.

Aircraft strength at the beginning of 1941 was 117 planes, mostly obsolete. In connection with defense plans for the Pacific, planes were brought to Hawaii throughout 1941 (principally P-36's and P-40's) by carrier. The first mass flight of Army bombers (21 B-17 Flying Fortresses) from Hamilton Field, California, arrived at Hickam on 13 May 1941. Nine of the 21 bombers were sent to Clark Field in September to begin a belated reinforcement of the Philippine Department. By 7 December 1941, the Hawaiian Air Force had been an integrated command for slightly more than one year under the command of Major General Frederick L. Martin, and consisted of 754 officers and 6,706 enlisted men with 231 military aircraft.

==== Order of Battle, 6 December 1941 ====
The day before the Japanese Attack on Hawaii, and subsequent United States entry into World War II, the Hawaiian Air Force consisted of the following:

- 14th Pursuit Wing, Wheeler Field, Territory of Hawaii

15th Pursuit Group (Fighter), Wheeler Fld

45th Pursuit Sqd (Fighter) (P-36A)
46th Pursuit Sqd (Fighter) (P-36A, P-40B)
47th Pursuit Sqd (Fighter) (P-40B, P-36A)
72d Pursuit Sqd (Interceptor) (none)

18th Pursuit Group (Interceptor), Wheeler Fld

6th Pursuit Sqd (Interceptor) (P-40B)
19th Pursuit Sqd (Interceptor) (P-40B, P-40C)
44th Pursuit Sqd (Interceptor), Bellows Fld (P-40B, P-40C)
73d Pursuit Sqd (Interceptor) (P-40B)
78th Pursuit Sqd (Interceptor) (P-40B)

- 18th Bombardment Wing, Hickam Field, Territory of Hawaii

5th Bombardment Group (Heavy), Hickam Fld

4th Reconnaissance Sqd (Heavy) (B-17, B-18)
23d Bombardment Sqd (Heavy) (B-17, B-18)
31st Bombardment Sqd (Heavy) (B-17, B-18)
72d Bombardment Sqd (Heavy) (B-17, B-18)

11th Bombardment Group (Heavy), Hickam Fld

26th Bombardment Sqd (Heavy) (B-17, B-18)
42d Bombardment Sqd (Heavy) (B-17, B-18)
50th Reconnaissance Sqd (Heavy) (B-17, B-18)

The B-17 squadrons were equipped with a mixture of B-17B, B-17C and B-17D models. Additional units assigned to Hawaiian Air Force on 6 December 1941 were:

- 19th Transport Sqd, Hickam Fld (C-33)
- 58th Bombardment Sqd (Light), Hickam Fld (A-20)
- 86th Observation Sqd, Bellows Fld (B-12, O-47, O-49)

In addition to the above units, during the night of 6–7 December 1941, another squadron, the 38th Reconnaissance Squadron of the 41st Bombardment Group, Davis-Monthan Field, Arizona, were en route to Hawaii with four B-17Cs and two B-17Es to reinforce the 18th Bombardment Wing.

Also, six B-17Es the 88th Reconnaissance Squadron, 7th Bombardment Group, were also en route to Hawaii from Hamilton Field, California, with a final destination of Clark Field, Luzon, Philippines.

These units were deploying due to the heightened tensions between the United States and the Empire of Japan. They arrived in Hawaii at the height of the attack on 7 December (radar operators mistakenly thought that the Japanese attack force was this flight arriving from California). Two of the B-17Es managed to land at a short fighter strip at Haleiwa, one B-17E set down on a golf course, one landed at Bellows Field and five B-17Cs and three B-17Es landed at Hickam under the strafing of Japanese planes.

=== World War II ===
==== Pearl Harbor Attack ====
The attack on Pearl Harbor or Hawaii Operation as it was called by the Japanese Imperial General Headquarters devastated the Hawaiian Air Force. Total Air Force casualties during the Japanese attack on 7 December were 163 killed. 43 missing, and 336 wounded, of which 121 killed, 37 missing, and 274 wounded were at Hickam Field. Out of a total of 231 aircraft of the Hawaiian Air Force, 64 were destroyed and not more than 79 were left usable. Some fighters were scrambled and managed to engage Japanese aircraft.

==== Seventh Air Force ====
On 5 February 1942, the Hawaiian Air Force was re-designated 7th Air Force.

- VII Bomber Command replaced the 18th Bombardment Wing
- VII Fighter Command replaced the 14th Pursuit Wing
- VII Base Command assumed responsibility for various base and service functions, along with the Hawaiian Air Depot. VII Air Force Base Command became VII Air Force Service Command under Brig. Gen. Walter J. Reed on 15 October 1942.

The 7th Air Force was redesignated Seventh Air Force on 18 September 1942

Re-equipping of the command after the Japanese attack on Oahu took a significant length of time. The re-equipped Seventh Air Force consisted of the following units:

VII FIGHTER COMMAND	FIGHTER GROUPS	BOMB GROUPS	MISCELLANEOUS
548th Night Fighter Squadron (Northrop P-61 Black Widow)	15th Fighter Group	5th Bombardment Group (Boeing B-17 Flying Fortress/Consolidated B-24 Liberator)	28th Photo Reconnaissance Squadron (Lockheed F-5B Lightning)
549th Night Fighter Squadron (Northrop P-61 Black Widow)	18th Fighter Group	11th Bombardment Group (Consolidated B-24 Liberator)	9th Troop Carrier Squadron(Douglas C-47 Skytrain/Curtiss C-46 Commando)
	21st Fighter Group	30th Bombardment Group (Consolidated B-24 Liberator)	163d Liaison Squadron (Stinson L-5 Sentinel)
	318th Fighter Group	41st Bombardment Group (North American B-25 Mitchell)	41st Photo Reconnaissance Squadron (Lockheed F-5 Lightning)
	508th Fighter Group	307th Bombardment Group (Boeing B-17 Flying Fortress/Consolidated B-24 Liberator)	
		319th Bombardment Group (Douglas A-26 Invader)	

In Hawaii the Seventh Air Force used the following military airfields. Some were operated solely by the AAF, others were jointly used with the United States Navy. Wartime images of these airfields are linked to their names as most of them were minimal facility landing fields.

- Bellows AAF, Oahu
- Haleiwa AAF, Oahu
- Hickam AAF, Oahu
- Hilo AAF/NAS, Hawaii
- Homestead Field AAF/Molokai NAF, Molokai
- Kahaku AAF, Oahu
- Kipapa Field AAF, Oahu
- Kualoa Field AAF, Oahu
- Mana AAF / Barking Sands NAAF, Kauai
- Mokuleia AAF, Oahu
- Suiter Field, Hawaii

Joint USAAF/Navy

- Waieli Strip AAF (Aux), Oahu
- Wheeler AAF, Oahu

==== Wartime operations ====

Seventh Air Force retained the mission of its predecessor of the defense of the Hawaiian Islands and, until the closing months of the war, it maintained its headquarters at Hickam Field. Clarence L. Tinker, an Osage and career officer, was named commander of the Seventh Air Force, and promoted to major general in January 1942, the first Native American to reach that rank and the highest-ranking one in the Army. He led a force of B-24s during the Battle of Midway, and his plane went down in June 1942. No bodies were recovered.

In Hawaii, the command grew into a key position in the logistical organization of the Pacific war. One of the biggest elements of this organization was the Hawaiian Air Depot at Hickam, which served as an in-transit supply, repair, and modification center for force units scattered all the way to Australia. The Air Depot had to expand its activities, which in peacetime included assembly, repair, and reconditioning of aircraft, to handle large numbers of P-39s and P-40s. These were rushed out in crates for assembly, flight-testing, and delivery to forward-deployed combat units.

Seventh Air Force also became the hub of the Pacific aerial network. In addition to Depot functions, it supported the 4-engine all-weather transport used in ferrying troops, supplies, and evacuating wounded from forward areas. These transport planes were under the command of Pacific Division, Air Transport Command. The command also played a major role throughout the Pacific War as a training, staging, and supply-center for air and ground troops.

The command deployed most of its combat units to the Central Pacific, where operations were best summed up by its air and ground views as "Just one damned island after another!"

Seventh Air Force units deployed 2,000 miles southwest to the Gilbert Islands, then 600 miles northwest to the Marshall Islands, 900 miles west to the Caroline Islands, 600 miles northwest to the Mariana Islands, 600 miles north to Iwo Jima, 1,000 miles west to Okinawa, always edging closer towards the center of Japanese power. A map story of the Seventh Air Force would cover 3,000 miles north and south of Midway Atoll to Fiji, and 5,000 miles east and west from Pearl Harbor to the Ryukus. The combat record of its major units is as follows:

- The 15th Fighter Group was re-equipped after the Pearl Harbor attack and remained in Hawaii as part of the Hawaiian Defense Force, although rotated squadrons to the Central Pacific attached to Thirteenth Air Force groups. In April 1944, it received North American P-51 Mustang fighters and trained for long-range bomber escort missions. The group deployed to Iwo Jima in February 1945 and was reassigned to Twentieth Air Force for the remainder of the war. In November 1945 it returned to Hawaii and Seventh Air Force in November 1945.
- The 18th Fighter Group was re-equipped after the Pearl Harbor attack, then was deployed to the Central Pacific and reassigned to Thirteenth Air Force. It began operations from Guadalcanal. Moving across the Pacific, at the end of the war, the group moved to Clark Field on Luzon and became a permanent part of Far East Air Forces after the war.
- The 21st Fighter Group was created in Hawaii in March 1944 and initially was part of the Hawaiian Defense Force flying Bell P-39 Airacobras. Re-equipped with P-51 Mustangs in January 1945 and trained for long-range bomber escort missions. The group deployed to Iwo Jima in February 1945. Was reassigned to Twentieth Air Force for the remainder of the war, being inactivated on Guam in April 1946.
- The 318th Fighter Group was created in Hawaii in May 1942 as part of the Hawaiian Defense Force flying P-39s, P-40s and later Republic P-47 Thunderbolts. Deployed to the Central Pacific being attached to Thirteenth Air Force in June 1944. Reassigned to Eighth Air Force in July 1945 in preparation for the Invasion of Japan. Returned to the United States in January 1946 and was inactivated.
- The 508th Fighter Group was created on 12 October 1944 at Peterson Field, Colorado. The group trained with P-47 Thunderbolts to provide very-long-range escort for Boeing B-29 Superfortress bombardment units in the Southwest Pacific Theater. The lack of significant Japanese fighter defense by late 1944 caused a change of mission and the group was reassigned to Seventh Air Force in Hawaii in January 1945 and served as part of the Hawaiian Defense Force. In Hawaii, the group also trained replacement pilots for other organizations, repaired P-47s and P-51s received from combat units, and ferried aircraft to forward areas. The unit was inactivated in Hawaii on 25 November 1945 when it replaced by the 15th Fighter Group.
- The 5th Bombardment Group was re-equipped after the Pearl Harbor attack with a mixture of B-17 Flying Fortresses and Consolidated B-24 Liberator bombers. The unit was engaged primarily in search and patrol missions off Hawaii from December 1941 to November 1942. In Hawaii, the group was used in the Battle of Midway to attack Japanese surface fleets. It was deployed to Espírito Santo in the Solomon Islands and served in combat with Thirteenth Air Force during the Allied drive from the Solomons to the Philippines. It was assigned to the Philippines in 1945 until the end of the war.
- The 11th Bombardment Group was re-equipped after the Pearl Harbor attack with B-24 Liberators and initially flew patrol missions around Hawaii. It was deployed to the New Hebrides in July 1942 where it became part of Thirteenth Air Force and engaged in combat operations in the central Pacific.
- The 30th Bombardment Group was reassigned to Seventh Air Force in October 1943 from March Field, California where it flew west coast antisubmarine patrols for Fourth Air Force. It was deployed to the Ellice Islands in the central Pacific during November 1943, where its B-24 Liberators took part in the invasion of the Gilbert Islands. Remaining part of Seventh Air Force, the group moved westward across the Pacific, taking part in several campaigns until returning to Wheeler Field, Hawaii in March 1945. From Wheeler, the group flew patrol missions until being inactivated in June 1946.
- The 41st Bombardment Group was formed at March Field, California in January 1941 and performed antisubmarine patrols along the west coast until deploying to Seventh Air Force in Hawaii during October 1943 for final overseas training. From Hawaii, the group deployed its North American B-25 Mitchell medium bombers to Tarawa in the central Pacific in December 1943. Remaining as part of 7AF, the group took part in combat operations across the western Pacific as well as attacking targets on Taiwan and mainland China as well as the Japanese home islands. It was inactivated at Clark Field, Philippines on 27 January 1946.
- The 307th Bombardment Group was reassigned to Seventh Air Force in October 1942 from Fourth Air Force, where it flew patrols off the west coast, first in B-17s and later in B-24s. In Hawaii, the group trained and flew patrol and search missions. Attacked Wake Island in December 1942 and January 1943, by staging through Midway Island. The group deployed to Guadalcanal in February 1943 and was assigned to Thirteenth Air Force. It served in combat, primarily in the Central and Southwest Pacific, until the war ended.
- The 319th Bombardment Group was assigned to Seventh Air Force late in the war, after spending three years in combat with the Twelfth and Fifteenth Air Forces in the North African Campaign and Italian Campaign in the Mediterranean Theater. It joined Seventh Air Force in Okinawa flying Douglas A-26 Invaders during April 1945 and flew combat missions over China and the Japanese home islands. It returned to the United States in December 1945 where it was inactivated at Fort Lewis, Washington.

The Seventh Air Force along with Thirteenth Air Force in the Central Pacific and Fifth Air Force in Australia were assigned to the newly created United States Far East Air Forces (FEAF) on 3 August 1944. FEAF was subordinate to the U.S. Army Forces Far East and served as the headquarters of Allied Air Forces Southwest Pacific Area. By 1945, three numbered air forces—5th, 7th and 13th—were supporting operations in the Pacific. FEAF was the functional equivalent in the Pacific of the United States Strategic Air Forces (USSTAF) in the European Theater of Operations.

From mid-1944 to July 1945, the Seventh Air Force tried to prevent the Japanese air attacks on the Mariana Islands by attacking Iwo Jima and other Japanese-held islands and providing fighter protection for the Marianas. During the summer of 1945, the 15th Fighter Group (along with the 21st and 318th from the VII Fighter Command) were reassigned to the Twentieth Air Force. They continued fighter sweeps against Japanese airfields and other targets, in addition to flying long-range B-29 escort missions to Japanese cities, until the end of the war. In addition, effective 14 July 1945, the Seventh Air Force command echelon was moved to Okinawa, Ryukyu Islands, and assigned to United States Far East Air Force. VII Fighter Command remained attached to 20th Air Force until the end of the war.

=== Pacific Air Command ===
On 1 January 1946, Seventh Air Force was reassigned without personnel or equipment to Hickam Field, Hawaii, where it resumed its prewar mission of defense of the Hawaiian Islands. In May 1946 the Hawaiian Air Depot assumed jurisdiction of Hickam Field.

On 15 December 1947, Seventh Air Force was re-designated Pacific Air Command (PACAIRCOM) and elevated to major command status. The Hawaiian Air Depot was re-designated Hawaiian Air Materiel Area (HAWAMA) both at Hickam. PACAIRCOM's mission was to oversee air defense and other operations in the Pacific Ocean area, of the Pacific Region from the Hawaiian Islands west to include Wake, Midway Atoll, the Mariana, Caroline, Solomon and Marshall Islands.

Pacific Air Command was discontinued effective 1 June 1949 as a result of a budgetary actions. Its mission, functions, responsibilities and command jurisdiction of installations and facilities transferred to the Pacific Division, Military Air Transport Service.

=== Cold War ===
During the Korean War, and the years following, Hawaii again became the hub of trans-Pacific military air activity. In March 1954, the Joint Chiefs of Staff directed that Pacific Air Force be established. This unit came into being on 1 July 1954, the primary mission being to serve as the USAF component on the staff of the Commander-in-Chief Pacific (CINCPAC). Responsibilities included preparation of plans to support CINCPAC and allied operations. For purely Air Force matters, the new command was placed under the command of Far East Air Forces Headquarters located in Japan. That headquarters completed its move to Hickam on 1 July 1957, its designation being changed to Pacific Air Forces.

With the reactivation of Pacific Air Force, Seventh Air Force was reactivated on 5 January 1955 at Hickam AFB. It was assigned to Pacific Air Force (later, Pacific Air Force/FEAF [Rear]) and transferred to Wheeler AFB, Hawaii, in March 1955.

Seventh Air Force oversaw Pacific Air Force's area of responsibility east of 140 degrees east longitude, including the Hawaiian Islands. Seventh was also responsible for the air defense of the islands. However, the movement of United States Far East Air Force (renamed Pacific Air Forces) from Japan to Hawaii led to the inactivation of Seventh Air Force on 1 July 1957.

=== Vietnam War ===
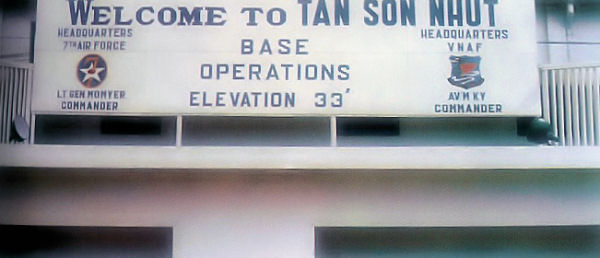
Headquarter of Seventh Air Force in Tan Son Nhut Air Base, Saigon, Republic of Vietnam.

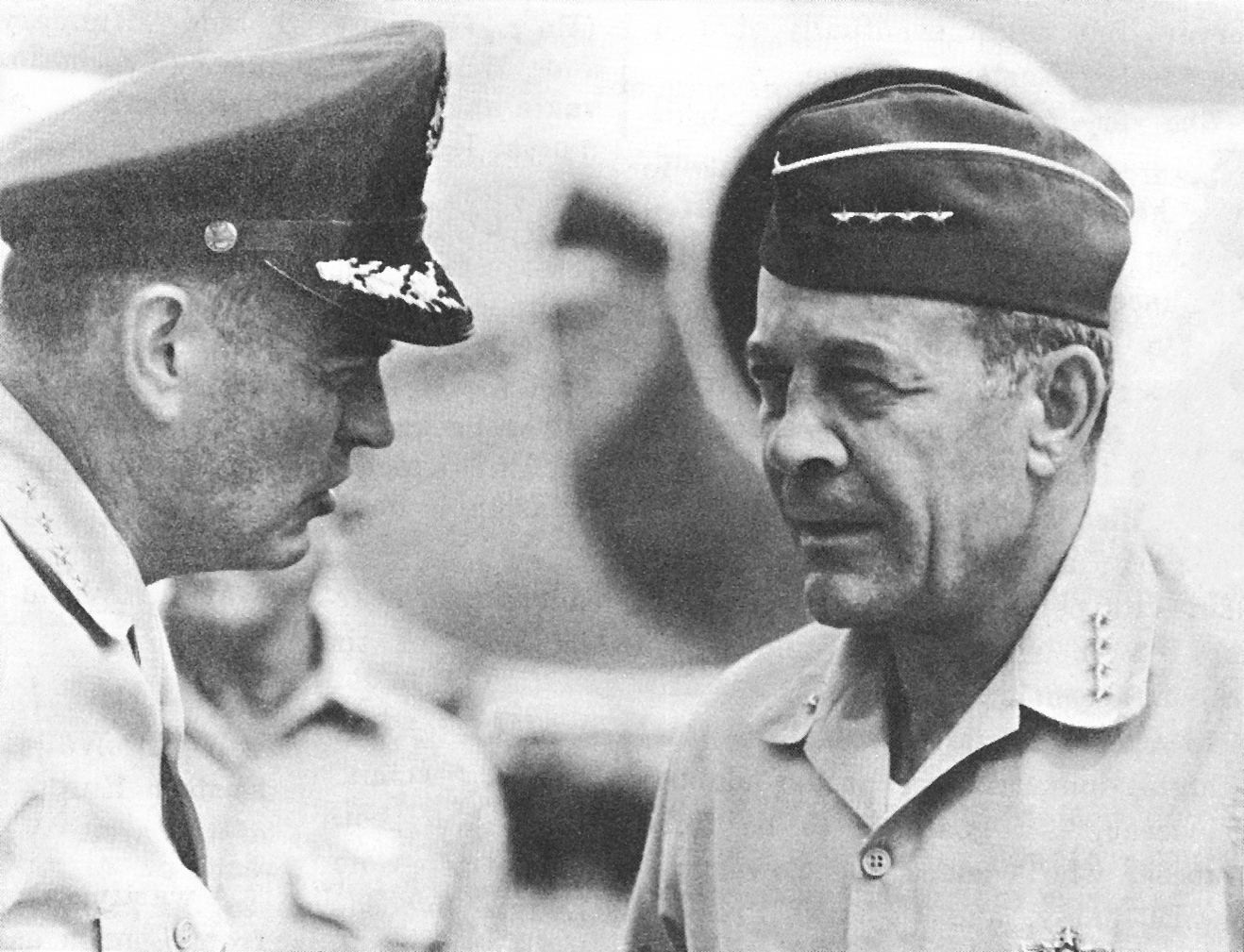
Seventh Air Force Commander General George S. Brown with Pacific Air Force Commander General Joseph J. Nazzaro. Both Seventh Air Force and Pacific Air Force played a major role in overseeing all United States Air Force operation in South Vietnam during the Vietnam War.

Seventh Air Force was revived under the command of Lt. Gen. Joseph H. Moore to serve Pacific Air Forces during the Vietnam War when the growth of forces required a replacement for the 2d Air Division. In this capacity Seventh Air Force was the Air Component Command of Military Assistance Command, Vietnam (MACV).

Upon reactivation on 28 March 1966, Seventh Air Force was designated a combat command at Tan Son Nhut Air Base, overseeing the operations of the ten primary USAF bases in the Republic of Vietnam. From April 1966 until 1973, the command assumed responsibility for most Air Force operations in Vietnam and shared responsibility with the Thirteenth Air Force for operations conducted from Thailand as 7/13 Air Force.

In June 1966, the first US air attacks near Hanoi and Haiphong occurred when 7AF planes bombed nearby oil installations. The following month, US aircraft struck North Vietnamese forces inside the Vietnamese Demilitarized Zone (DMZ).

The Siege of Khe Sanh ("Operation Niagara") involved significant efforts by Seventh Air Force. More than 24,000 tactical and 2700 Boeing B-52 Stratofortress strikes dropped 110,000 tons of ordnance in attacks that averaged over 300 sorties per day. At night, Douglas AC-47 Spooky gunships kept up fire against enemy troops. In August 1968, General George S. Brown began to oversee the Vietnamization of the air war. By 1970, this effort was successful enough that General Brown released the first USAF units to leave Vietnam.

=== US Support Activities Group/7th Air Force ===
Under the terms of the Paris Peace Accords, MACV and all American and third country forces had to be withdrawn from South Vietnam within 60 days of the ceasefire. A multi-service organization was required to plan for the application of U.S. air and naval power into North or South Vietnam, Cambodia or Laos, should this be required and ordered. Called the United States Support Activities Group & 7th Air Force (USSAG/7th AF), it was to be located at Nakhon Phanom Royal Thai Air Force Base in northeast Thailand. In addition a small U.S. military headquarters was needed to continue the military assistance program for the South Vietnamese military and supervise the technical assistance still required to complete the goals of Vietnamization and also to report operational and military intelligence through military channels to DOD authorities. This headquarters was to become the Defense Attaché Office, Saigon.

The advance echelon of USSAG/7AF moved from Tan Son Nhut to Nakhon Phanom on 29 January 1973. Transfer of the main body, drawn largely from the operations and intelligence sections of MACV and Seventh Air Force, began on 10 February. USSAG was activated on 11 February 1973 under the command of commander of MACV, but at 08:00 on 15 February, USAF General John W. Vogt Jr., as USSAG/7AF commander, took over from MACV control of American air operations. U.S. air support operations into Cambodia continued under USSAG/7th AF until August 1973. The DAO was established as a subsidiary command of MACV and remained under the command of commander of MACV until the deactivation of MACV on 27 March 1973 at which time command passed to the Commander USSAG/Seventh Air Force at Nakhon Phanom.

On 27 April 1973 CINCPAC published its terms of reference for USSAG/7th AF, these were: "USSAG/7AF, Thailand will plan for resumption of an effective air campaign in Laos, Cambodia, the Republic of Vietnam and North Vietnam as directed by CINCPAC; maintain a command and control structure for the management of air elements which may be committed to it and a capability for interface with [the South Vietnamese] air control system; establish and maintain liaison with [the South Vietnamese Joint General Staff], CTF 77 and committed SAC forces; and exercise command over [DAO Saigon]".In addition to combat air operations the command was charged with conducting Joint Casualty Resolution Center activities in Cambodia, Laos, South and North Vietnam, to coordinate search and rescue operations in Southeast Asia and adjacent waters and make recommendations concerning USAF levels in Thailand. the command was also to supervise through DAO the management and/or coordination of US DOD and contracted activities remaining in South Vietnam including logistics, intelligence training, South Vietnamese Joint General Staff liaison, operations and communications electronics, and monitor the security assistance planning for South Vietnam, making recommendations to CINCPAC and the services as appropriate.

USSAG/7th AF oversaw the ongoing US air campaigns in Cambodia and Laos until the prohibition on offensive operations came into effect on 14 August 1973.

Following a directive from the Joint Chiefs of Staff, CINCPAC on 11 June 1975 directed the disestablishment of USSAG/7th AF. The disestablishment was effective at 17:00 on 30 June. With the disestablishment of USSAG/7th AF control of the Four Party Joint Military Team established under the Paris Peace Accords, the Joint Casualty Resolution Center and the residual Defense Attaché Office reverted to CINCPAC.

=== Post Cold War ===
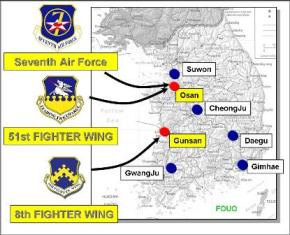
7th Air Force Bases

On 11 September 1986, Seventh Air Force was reactivated at Osan Air Base, South Korea to replace the 314th Air Division. Since then, 7AF, as the US Air Force component to the US and ROK Combined Forces Command's Air Component Command, has been an integral part of deterring aggression from North Korea against the ROK.

Headquarters Seventh Air Force consists of approximately 10,000 Air Force personnel located primarily at Osan AB, Kunsan AB, and five other collocated operating bases throughout the Republic of Korea. Air Force personnel fly and maintain the General Dynamics F-16 Fighting Falcon and the Fairchild Republic A/OA-10 Thunderbolt II combat aircraft, and perform a myriad of intelligence, logistics, planning, communications, and liaison duties.

Although primarily a combat ready command, 7AF also provides assistance to non-combatants and civilians with the region. Rescue at sea, typhoon evacuations, and medical assistance are typical missions.

=== Lineage ===
- Established as Hawaiian Air Force on 19 October 1940

Activated on 1 November 1940
Redesignated: 7th Air Force on 5 February 1942
Redesignated: Seventh Air Force on 18 September 1942
Redesignated: Pacific Air Command on 15 December 1947

Upgraded to Major Command 15 December 1947

Discontinued on 1 June 1949

- Redesignated Seventh Air Force on 10 December 1954

Activated on 5 January 1955
Inactivated on 1 July 1957

- Activated on 28 March 1966

Organized on 1 April 1966
Inactivated on 30 June 1975

- Activated on 8 September 1986

=== Assignments ===
- Hawaiian Department, U.S. Army, 1 November 1940
- U.S. Army Forces in Central Pacific Area, c. 16 August 1943
- Army Air Forces, Pacific Ocean Areas (AAFPOA), 1 August 1944
- Far East Air Forces (later, Pacific Air Command, U.S. Army), 14 July 1945
- Army Air Forces (later, United States Air Force), 1 January 1947 – 1 June 1949
- Pacific Air Force (later, Pacific Air Force/Far East Air Forces [Rear]), 5 January 1955 – 1 July 1957
- Pacific Air Forces, 28 March 1966 – 30 June 1975
- Pacific Air Forces, 8 September 1986—present

=== Stations ===
- Fort Shafter, Hawaii, 1 November 1940
- Hickam Field (later, Hickam AFB), Hawaii, c. 12 July 1941
- East Field, Saipan, Mariana Islands, 19 December 1944
- Yontan Airfield, Okinawa, 12 July 1945
- Hickam Field, Hawaii, 1 January 1946 – 1 June 1949
- Hickam AFB, Hawaii, 5 January 1955
- Wheeler AFB, Hawaii, 24 March 1955 – 1 July 1957
- Tan Son Nhut Air Base, South Vietnam, 1 April 1966 – March 1973
- Nakhon Phanom Royal Thai Navy Base, Thailand, 29 March 1973 – 30 June 1975
- Osan AB, Republic of Korea, 8 September 1986

=== Components ===
Commands

- 7th Air Force Base (later, VII Air Force Base; VII Air Force Service): 19 February 1942 – 15 August 1944
- VII Air Service Area: 3 August 1944 – 12 August 1945
- 7th Bomber (later, VII Bomber): 29 January 1942 – 1 January 1946
- 7th Interceptor (later, 7th Fighter; VII Fighter): 2 February 1942 – 1 March 1945; 14–16 July 1945

Divisions

- 7th Air (formerly, 7th Fighter Wing): 1 January 1946 – 3 September 1948
- 834th Air: 15 October 1966 – 1 December 1971.

== List of commanders ==
No.	Commander		Term		
No.	Portrait	Name	Took office	Left office	Term length
1	Jack I. Gregory	Lieutenant General; Jack I. Gregory (born 1931)	8 September 1986	9 December 1986	92 days
2	Craven C. Rogers Jr.	Lieutenant General; Craven C. Rogers Jr. (1934–2016)	9 December 1986	31 October 1988	1 year, 327 days
3	Thomas A. Baker	Lieutenant General; Thomas A. Baker (born 1935)	31 October 1988	7 July 1990	1 year, 249 days
4	Ronald Fogleman	Lieutenant General; Ronald Fogleman (born 1942)	7 July 1990	17 August 1992	2 years, 41 days
5	Howell M. Estes III	Lieutenant General; Howell M. Estes III (born 1941)	17 August 1992	30 September 1994	2 years, 44 days
6	Ronald W. Iverson	Lieutenant General; Ronald W. Iverson	30 September 1994	7 April 1997	2 years, 189 days
7	Joseph E. Hurd	Lieutenant General; Joseph E. Hurd	7 April 1997	14 September 1999	2 years, 160 days
8	Charles R. Heflebower	Lieutenant General; Charles R. Heflebower (born 1945)	14 September 1999	19 November 2001	2 years, 66 days
9	Lance L. Smith	Lieutenant General; Lance L. Smith (born 1946)	19 November 2001	19 November 2003	2 years, 0 days
10	Garry R. Trexler	Lieutenant General; Garry R. Trexler (born 1947)	19 November 2003	6 November 2006	2 years, 352 days
11	Stephen G. Wood	Lieutenant General; Stephen G. Wood (born 1949)	6 November 2006	24 November 2008	2 years, 18 days
12	Jeffrey A. Remington	Lieutenant General; Jeffrey A. Remington (born 1955)	24 November 2008	6 January 2012	3 years, 43 days
13	Jan-Marc Jouas	Lieutenant General; Jan-Marc Jouas	6 January 2012	19 December 2014	2 years, 347 days
14	Terrence J. O'Shaughnessy	Lieutenant General; Terrence J. O'Shaughnessy (born 1962)	19 December 2014	8 July 2016	1 year, 202 days
15	Thomas W. Bergeson	Lieutenant General; Thomas W. Bergeson (born 1962)	8 July 2016	27 August 2018	2 years, 50 days
16	Kenneth S. Wilsbach	Lieutenant General; Kenneth S. Wilsbach (born 1965)	27 August 2018	12 June 2020	1 year, 290 days
17	Scott L. Pleus	Lieutenant General; Scott L. Pleus	12 June 2020	30 January 2024	3 years, 232 days
18	David R. Iverson	Lieutenant General; David R. Iverson (born c. 1969)	30 January 2024	7 August 2026	2 years, 189 days
19	David G. Shoemaker	Lieutenant General; David G. Shoemaker (born c. 1972)	7 August 2026	Incumbent	39 days

== See also ==
- United States Pacific Air Forces
- United States Forces Korea (USFK)
- Military of South Korea (ROK Armed Forces)
- United States Air Force in Thailand (Vietnam War)
- United States Air Force in South Korea (Korean War)
