= Joseph Harold Moore =

US Air Force general

Joseph H. Moore
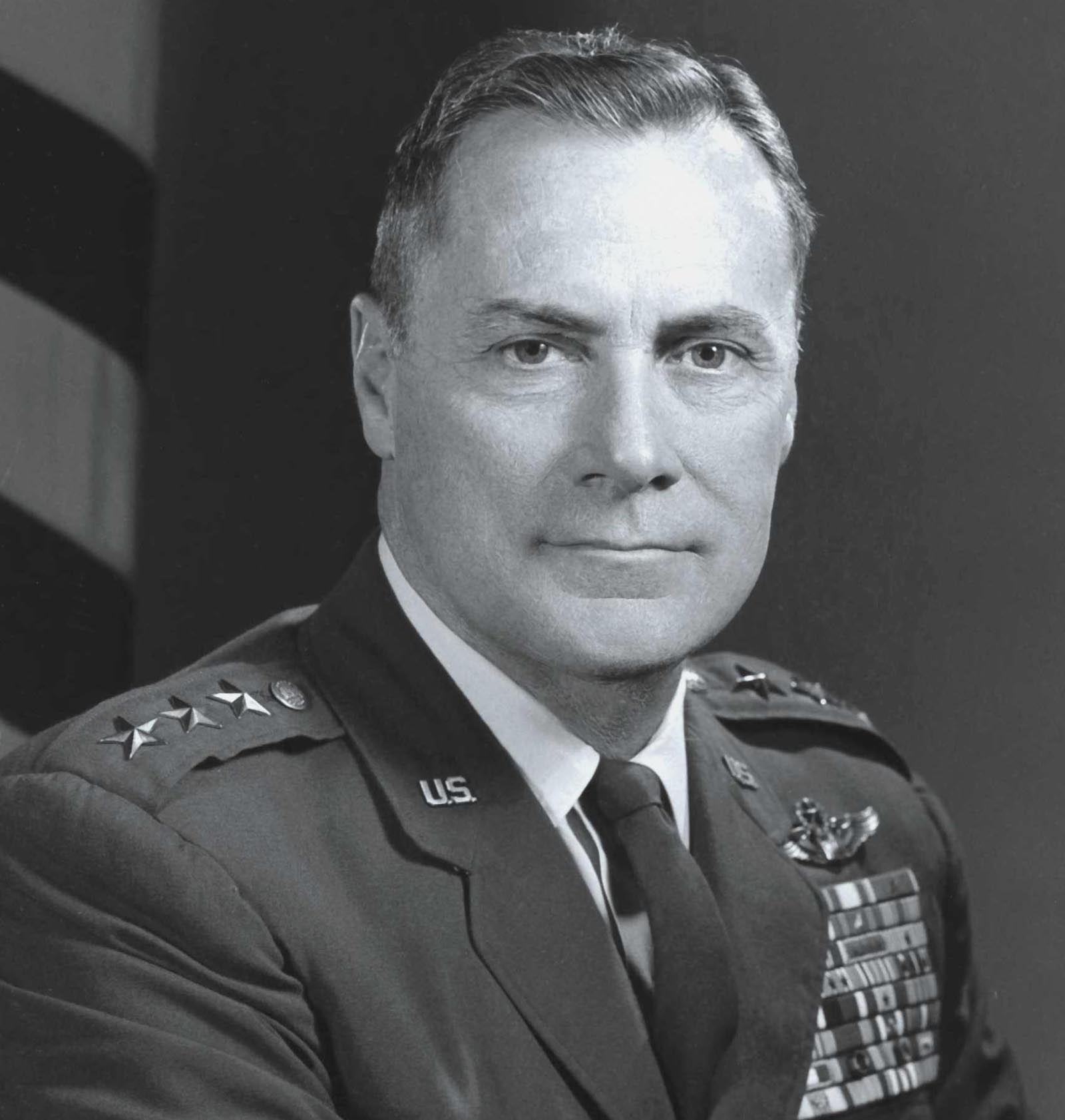
- Lieutenant General Joseph H. Moore
- Born: April 27, 1914; Florence, South Carolina, U.S.A.
- Died: December 27, 2006 (aged 92); San Antonio, Texas
- Burial place: Ft Sam Houston National Cemetery
- Military career
- Allegiance: United States of America
- Branch: United States Air Force: United States Army; United States Army Air Forces; United States Army Air Corps
- Service years: 1937–1971
- Rank: Lieutenant General
- Commands: 4th Tactical Fighter Wing, 2nd Air Division, Seventh Air Force, Inspector General of the Air Force
- Conflicts: World War II; Vietnam War
- Awards: Distinguished Service Cross; Air Force Distinguished Service Medal; Legion of Merit(2); Distinguished Flying Cross(2); Air Medal(6); Air Force Commendation Medal; Army Commendation Medal
- Other work: National Commander of the Order of Daedalians

Joseph Harold Moore (27 April 1914 – 27 December 2006) was a lieutenant general in the United States Air Force (USAF), known for his role as commander of the 2nd Air Division and Seventh Air Force during part the Vietnam War, and in particular, his leadership role in Operation Rolling Thunder.

== Biography ==
Born in Florence, South Carolina in 1914, General Moore spent his childhood and school days in Spartanburg. He graduated from Spartanburg High School, attended Wofford College for two years, and later Centenary College of Louisiana in Shreveport, Louisiana. General Moore entered the military service as an aviation cadet in June 1937 and was awarded his pilot wings and second lieutenant commission in the United States Army Air Corps in June 1938.

When World War II started he was in the Philippine Islands and by April 1942 had flown 100 combat hours in P-40 Warhawk fighter aircraft. He also flew a salvaged United States Navy Grumman J2F Duck nicknamed "Candy Clipper" delivering much needed aid to the besieged troops on Bataan and Corregidor. After the fall of Bataan he made his way to Australia and served with United States Army Air Forces units there until August 1942. He then returned to the United States for short tours in Florida, Virginia and Pennsylvania before being sent to Europe in November 1943, where he took part in the Normandy, North France and Rhineland Campaigns.

He remained in Europe until January 1945 returning to the United States to spend the next two years in various operations and training assignments including Command and General Staff School at Fort Leavenworth, Kansas. In December 1946 he was assigned to Europe with the Army of Occupation in Germany. In October 1947 he returned to the Pentagon as deputy chief, Zone of Interior Commands Branch, Office of the Director of Plans and Operations, USAF Headquarters and was elevated to chief in June 1948. In May 1951 he assumed command of the 137th Fighter-Bomber Wing at Alexandria Municipal Airport, Louisiana.

His third tour of duty in Europe began in May 1952 when he moved the first fighter-bomber unit assigned to NATO to France. In June 1953 he was appointed deputy assistant chief of staff for operations for the Twelfth Air Force at Ramstein, West Germany. The following April he was designated deputy chief of staff, United States Air Forces in Europe, and in July, vice chief of staff, USAFE.

In August 1955 he returned to the United States to enter the National War College in Washington, D.C. Upon graduation in June 1956, he became commander of the 323d Fighter-Bomber Wing at Bunker Hill Air Force Base, Indiana. He was transferred to Shaw Air Force Base, South Carolina, as Ninth Air Force Deputy Chief of Staff for Operations in July 1957.

In June 1958 he became chief of staff of the Ninth Air Force where he remained until he took command of the 4th Tactical Fighter Wing, Seymour Johnson Air Force Base, North Carolina, in February 1959.

On December 11, 1959, he received the Bendix Trophy for flying a F-105 Thunderchief over a 100 kilometer closed course to establish a world speed record of 1,216 mph.

Moore was assigned to Headquarters Tactical Air Command, Langley Air Force Base, Virginia., as assistant deputy for operations in October 1961. In January 1964 he became commander of the 2nd Air Division in South Vietnam, and in June 1965 assumed the additional position of deputy commander for air operations, Military Assistance Command, Vietnam. On April 1, 1966, the Seventh Air Force was reactivated and assumed the expanding mission formerly assigned to 2nd Air Division in Southeast Asia and he remained as commander. In July 1966 he became vice commander in chief, Pacific Air Forces. General Moore was assigned as the Inspector General of the Air Force in August 1967.

He was rated a command pilot and held the Distinguished Service Cross, Air Force Distinguished Service Medal, Legion of Merit with oak leaf cluster, Distinguished Flying Cross with oak leaf cluster, Air Medal with five oak leaf clusters, Air Force Commendation Medal and the Army Commendation Medal.

Moore retired from the United States Air Force on April 1, 1971. After retirement, he and his wife, Virl, moved to Mrytle Beach, South Carolina, and then to San Antonio, Texas. Virl died in 1980. Moore later married, Heide, and continued residing in San Antonio, Texas. He was a National Commander of the Order of Daedalians, a fraternity of military pilots. He died on Dec. 27, 2006 and was interred at Fort Sam Houston National Cemetery.
