= Wheeler Army Airfield =

United States Army aviation base in Honolulu, Hawaii, USA

- Wahiawa, Hawaii in the United States
- A US Army UH-60 Blackhawk preparing for flight at Wheeler AAF during 2011

Site information
- Type: Army Airfield
- Owner: Department of Defense
- Operator: US Army
- Controlled by: Combat Aviation Brigade, 25th Infantry Division
- Condition: Operational
- Website: Official website (US Army Garrison Hawaii)

Location
- Location in Hawaii Wheeler AAF (Oahu)
- Coordinates: 21°28′48″N 158°02′24″W

Site history
- Built: 1922
- In use: 1922 – present

Airfield information
- Identifiers: IATA: HHI, ICAO: PHHI, FAA LID: HHI, WMO: 911700
- Elevation: 255 m (837 ft) AMSL
Runways
| Direction | Length and surface |
|---|---|
| 6/24 | 1,708 m (5,604 ft) asphalt |

U.S. National Register of Historic Places

U.S. National Historic Landmark District
- Official name: Wheeler
- Designated: 28 May 1987
- Reference no.: 87001297
- Period: 1925–1949
- Area of significance: Military

Wheeler Army Airfield (IATA: HHI, ICAO: PHHI, FAA LID: HHI), also known as Wheeler Field and formerly as Wheeler Air Force Base, is a United States Army post located in the City & County of Honolulu and in the Wahiawa District of the Island of O'ahu, Hawaii. It is a National Historic Landmark for its role in the 7 December 1941 Japanese attack on Pearl Harbor.

== Overview ==
Wheeler AAF comprises approximately 1,389 acres (5.62 km^{2}) of land adjacent to Schofield Barracks and is home to a variety of Department of Defense activities including the Defense Information Systems Agency (DISA), the 169th Aircraft Control & Warning Squadron (169 ACWS) of the Hawaii Air National Guard, the 193rd Aviation Regiment (Medium Lift), Detachment 55 Operational Support Airlift (Det 55 OSA) of the Hawaii Army National Guard, the Regular Army's 25th Infantry Division's 25th Combat Aviation Brigade composed of the 25th Aviation Regiment, the 2nd Squadron-6th Cavalry Regiment, and the 209th Aviation Support Battalion, also located on Wheeler is the Trial Defense Service-Hawaii.

== History ==
On 6 February 1922, a detachment of 20 enlisted men from Luke Field, proceeded to Schofield Barracks, under Lieutenant William T. Agee, to clear the flying field on the grounds of the former 17th Cavalry Regiment drill grounds and construct housing for the divisional air service. Two canvas hangars were erected and the field cleared of weeds, guava and algaroba trees. Thus Wheeler Field got its modest start. It was named Wheeler Field on 11 November 1922 in honor of Major Sheldon H. Wheeler, former commander of Luke Field on Ford Island, killed in the crash of DH-4B, AAS Ser. No. 63525 on 13 July 1921.

In June 1923, 13 months after the designation of the new flying field, shop hangars, airplane hangars, and oil storage tanks were erected. In 1927, one of the wooden shop hangars was remodeled to provide space for a barracks and a mess hall incident to the formation of a pursuit group. It was not until 1930 that any permanent construction was started. Many different units were originally stationed at Wheeler Field. The first units of the Schofield Barracks divisional airdrome were the 4th Observation Squadron, Photo Section No. 11 and Branch Intelligence Office No. 11.

In October 1922, the photo section and intelligence units were returned to Luke Field. The following May, the 17th Composite Group was organized at Wheeler. It consisted of a Headquarters Squadron, the 19th Pursuit Squadron and the 4th Observation Squadron. These units operated from the field until January 1924, when the 17th Group was rendered inactive. Three years later, the foundation for the present 18th Pursuit Group was laid and the 6th and 19th Pursuit Squadrons were transferred from Luke Field. More squadrons were eventually added to the 18th Pursuit Group and Bellows Field was opened as an aerial gunnery camp for the use of tactical organizations. The 15th Pursuit Group was formed next and was made a permanent part of the airdrome. Hand in hand with this move came the formation of the 14th Pursuit Wing.

Wheeler Field was the site of several major historic aviation events prior to the attack on Pearl Harbor on 7 December 1941, including the first transpacific flight from California in 1927; the great Dole Air Race from California to Hawaii; the first transpacific flight from the U.S. to Australia in 1928, and the first Hawaii-to-Mainland solo flight in 1935 by Amelia Earhart. Ms. Earhart visited Wheeler Field in 1935 in her Lockheed Vega and in 1937 in her Lockheed Model 10 Electra. Kingsford Smith, in his plane, the Southern Cross, also used the airfield on his historic flights across the Pacific.

By 1940, Wheeler Field had evolved into a primary base for Army Air Corps pursuit (i.e., "fighter") aircraft such as the P-40 Warhawk, responsible for air defense of the Hawaiian Islands Territory.

=== World War II ===
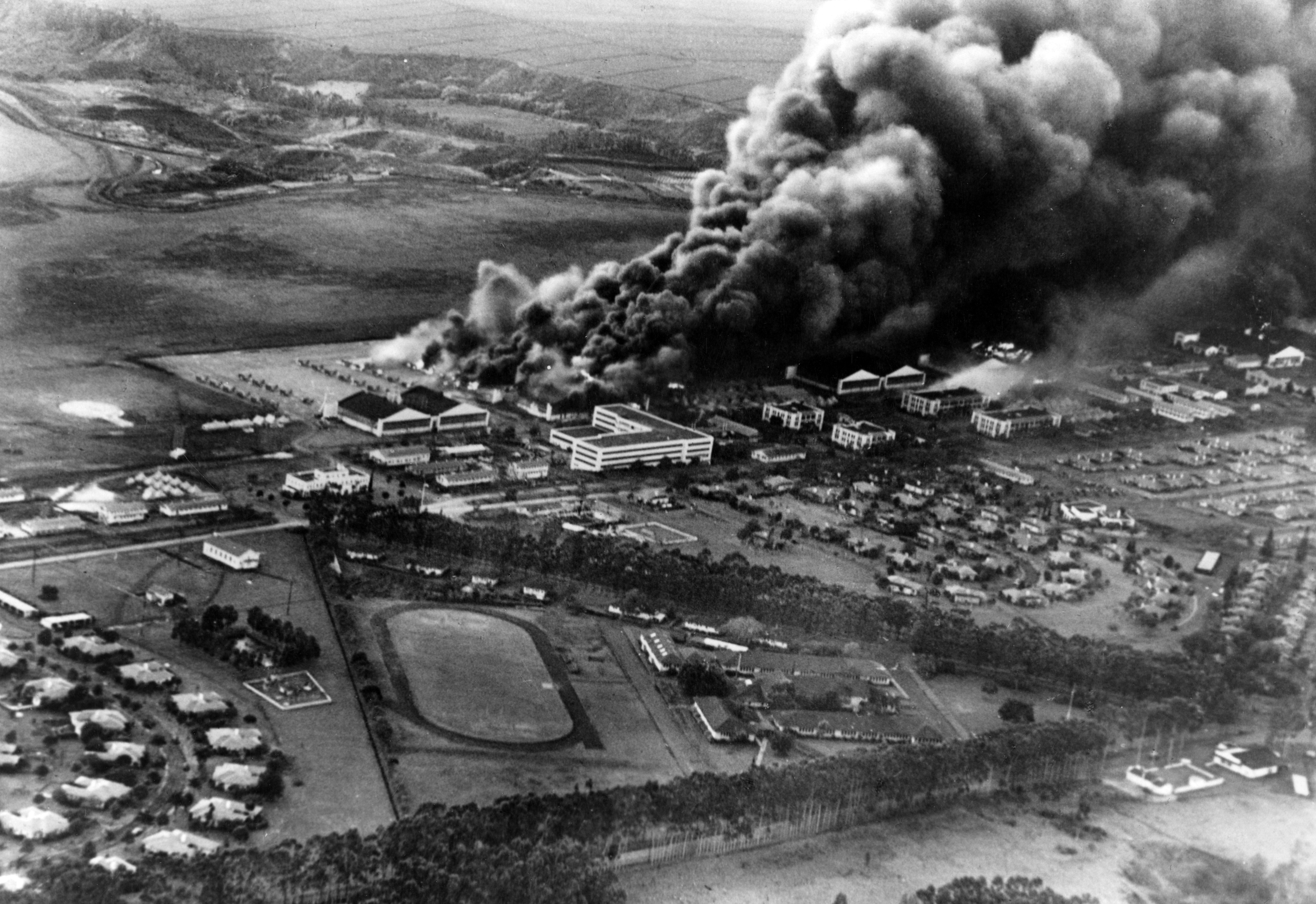
Curtiss P-40s burning at Wheeler, 7 December 1941

Wheeler Army Airfield was a primary target and site of the first attack on 7 December 1941, leading up to the attack on Pearl Harbor. The Japanese attacked the airfield to prevent the numerous planes there from getting airborne and engaging them. Most of the planes were destroyed, but 12 pilots assigned to the 15th Pursuit Group at Wheeler (predecessor of the present day 15th Wing) succeeded in getting their P-36 Hawk and P-40 Warhawk aircraft off the ground, engaged the Japanese in furious dogfights, and scored some of the first American victories of World War II.

2nd Lieutenant Phil Rasmussen found an old, unscathed Curtiss P-36 Hawk and taxied it to a revetment where he had it loaded with ammunition. During a lull in the bombing, he took off with three other pilots. Lieutenant Rasmussen managed to shoot down a Mitsubishi A6M Zero and the American pilots subsequently engaged 11 Japanese aircraft.

The installation has a National Historic Landmark District in association with the attack on 7 December 1941. The 1941 Flightline, hangars and barracks survive today.

Casualties at Wheeler totaled 33 killed and 75 wounded. Of the 233 aircraft assigned to the Hawaiian Air Force, 146 were in commission before the attack; afterward, only 83 were in commission (including 27 P-40s) and 76 had been totally destroyed. During World War II as part of the US Army Air Forces and until 1949 as part of the newly established United States Air Force, Wheeler was assigned to the Seventh Air Force (former Hawaiian Air Force) and successor commands.

=== World War II USAAF units assigned ===
- 7th Fighter Wing, 18 November 1946 – 1 May 1948
- 15th Fighter Group, 1 February – 15 October 1946
- 30th Bombardment Group, 1 March – 29 September 1945; 1 February – 25 January 1946
- 41st Bombardment Group, 14 October 1944 – 7 June 1945
- 81st Fighter Group, 15 October 1946 – 21 May 1949

- 6th Pursuit Squadron, 11 January 1927 – 30 August 1942; 2 October 1945 – 31 May 1946
- 19th Pursuit Squadron, 1 May 1923 – 15 January 1924; 11 January 1927 – 20 February 1942
- 26th Attack (later Bombardment) Squadron, 1 September 1930 – 1 February 1940; 20 December 1941 – 19 July 1942; 11 May – 11 November 1943
- 27th Bombardment Squadron, 23 May – 25 September 1945
- 38th Bombardment Squadron, 17 March – 21 September 1945
- 86th Observation Squadron, 1 February 1940 – 15 March 1941; 17 August 1942 – 28 June 1944

Re-designated: 43d Reconnaissance Squadron, 22–28 February 1946

- 44th Pursuit (later Fighter) Squadron, 12–27 December 1941; 25 January – 23 June 1942
- 44th Troop Carrier Squadron, 29 September 1945 – 25 March 1946
- 45th Troop Carrier Squadron, 29 September – 20 December 1945
- 46th Pursuit (later Fighter) Squadron, 1 December 1940 – 6 February 1942; 17 February – 13 October 1944
- 47th Bombardment Squadron, 5 November 1944 – 7 June 1945
- 47th Fighter Squadron, 9 February – 16 October 1946
- 48th Bombardment Squadron, 14 October 1944 – 20 May 1945
- 72d Fighter Squadron, 21 October – 18 December 1943
- 78th Pursuit (Later Fighter) Squadron, 1 February 1940 – 9 December 1941; 9 February – 15 October 1946
- 91st Fighter Squadron, 15 October 1946 – 21 May 1949
- 92d Fighter Squadron, 15 October 1946 – 21 May 1949
- 93d Fighter Squadron, 15 October 1946 – 21 May 1949
- 321st Bombardment Squadron, 12 September – 4 November 1942
- 371st Bombardment Squadron, 2 November 1942 – 13 June 1943
- 392d Bombardment Squadron, 23 May – 29 September 1945
- 396th Bombardment Squadron, 14 October 9144-20 May 19 May 1945
- 58th Bombardment Squadron, 1 January – 18 March 1941; 19 December 1941 – 18 June 1943
- 819th Bombardment Squadron, 12 November 1943 – 9 July 1944; 17 March – 26 September 1945
- 820th Bombardment Squadron, 14 October 1944 – 20 May 1945

=== Cold War ===
With the establishment of the U.S. Air Force as a separate service in 1947, Wheeler Army Air Base was re-designated Wheeler Air Force Base under the operational control of Pacific Air Forces (PACAF). The following year, the installation was placed on minimum caretaker status; however, with expansion of the Air Force during the Korean War, Wheeler AFB was restored to fully operational status in 1952.

On 24 February 1952, the 1508th Support Squadron was organized to provide administrative and logistical support to activities at Wheeler AFB. The unit was redesignated the 6487th Support Squadron on 1 April 1955, then inactivated on 1 November 1971, concurrent with activation of the 15th Air Base Squadron.

A subordinate unit of the 15th Air Base Wing, the 15 ABS served as the host organization at Wheeler AFB, which consisted of approximately 1,389 acres of land and facilities valued at over $37 million. Responsibilities of the 15 ABS included providing munitions service and support to all Air Force activities within the Hawaiian area, in addition to operating a small arms firing range where personnel of the Air Force, U.S. Customs and local law enforcement agencies were certified. During the 1960s, 1970s and 1980s, the installation hosted a number of Army and Air Force activities, including Army rotary-wing and fixed-wing aviation units and USAF fixed-wing air support / forward air control units flying the O-2 Skymaster and OV-10 Bronco.

In August 1987, the Secretary of the Interior designated Wheeler AFB as a National Historic Landmark, recognizing it as a site of national significance in the history of the United States and, in particular, World War II in the Pacific.

The 15th Air Base Squadron inactivated at Wheeler on 31 October 1991, one day before the U.S. Army assumed operational control of the installation in accordance with a memorandum of understanding signed by the Commander in Chief, Pacific Air Forces, and the Commander, US Army Western Command.

=== Return to Army control ===
On 1 November 1991, the Army held a simple ceremony to signify their takeover of the base, then changed the sign at the main gate to Wheeler Army Airfield. The installation, however, remained on the real property records of the 15th Air Base Wing until 15 March 1993 when an Action Memorandum signed by the Deputy Assistant Secretary of the Air Force (Environment, Safety and Occupational Health) and the Deputy Assistant Secretary of the Army (Installations and Housing) authorized the exchange of Wheeler AFB for Fort Kamehameha Military Reservation.

== Design ==
Wheeler Army Airfield was constructed in the pattern of the Garden City. These types of neighborhoods are the inspiration of Sir Ebenezer Howard of England, who designed these type neighborhoods in re-action to the industrial company towns that had blighted his nation. The neighborhoods are designed in loops with ample green spaces that were to be shared in common among the residents. The homes within the loops are of the Spanish Colonial Revival style that was flourishing in the 1920s and 1930s.

Today, Wheeler Army Airfield comprises approximately 1,389 acres (5.62 km^{2}) of land returned to the Department of the Army on 1 November 1991. As of the 2000 Census, the base had a total population of 2,829 military personnel and families.

== Geography ==
Wheeler AAF is located at 21°28'56" North, 158°2'24" West (21.482216, −158.039959). The Wheeler Main Gate is located on Kamehameha Highway (State Rte 99) running north to Wahiawā (becoming State Rte. 80) and connecting westward to Wilikina Road (State Rte. 99) and Schofield Barracks. Proceeding south on Kamehameha Hwy. provides access to Interstate H-2 and Milillani Town. The Wheeler Kunia Gate is off Kunia Road directly across from the Schofield Lyman Gate. Kunia Road (State Rte. 750) continues south to Kunia, and eventually Waipahu.

Wheeler is directly adjacent to Schofield Barracks across Kunia Road and to Wahiawā on the central plateau of the Island of O'ahu. The U.S. postal code for Wheeler Army Airfield is 96786.

According to the United States Census Bureau, the base has a total area of 2.3 square miles (6.0 km^{2}) none of which is covered by water.

== Demographics ==
Wheeler AFB-cum-Wheeler AAF is delineated for statistical purposes as a census-designated place (CDP). At the 2010 Census, the CDP had a resident population of 1,634.

As of the 2000 Census, there were 2,829 people, 739 households, and 724 families residing on the base. The population density was 1,235.6 inhabitants per square mile (477.1 inhabitants/km^{2}). There were 855 housing units at an average density of 373.4 per square mile (144.2/km^{2}). The racial makeup of the base was 57.02% White, 21.60% African American, 1.10% Native American, 3.99% Asian, 1.87% Pacific Islander, 6.33% from other races, and 8.09% from two or more races. 13.15% of the population were Hispanic or Latino of any race.

There were 739 households, out of which 77.9% had children under the age of 18 living with them, 89.7% were married couples living together, 6.4% had a female householder with no husband present, and 2.0% were non-families. 1.9% of all households were made up of individuals, and 0.0% had someone living alone who was 65 years of age or older. The average household size was 3.36 and the average family size was 3.38.

In the base the population was spread out, with 36.8% under the age of 18, 20.9% from 18 to 24, 40.9% from 25 to 44, 1.3% from 45 to 64, and 0.1% who were 65 years of age or older. The median age was 23 years. For every 100 females there were 119.8 males. For every 100 females age 18 and over, there were 127.8 males.

The median income for a household in the post was $32,485, and the median income for a family was $32,264. Males had a median income of $22,961 versus $22,151 for females. The per capita income for the post was $12,364. 7.9% of the population and 5.9% of families were below the poverty line. Out of the total population, 9.9% of those under the age of 18 and 0.0% of those 65 and older were living below the poverty line.

== Current Units ==
- Army
  - 25th Infantry Division, Combat Aviation Brigade
    - 25th Infantry Division, Combat Aviation Brigade HHC
    - 2nd Battalion, 25th Aviation Regiment (UH-60) "Diamond Head"
    - 3rd Battalion, 25th Aviation Regiment (CH-47) (UH-60) "Hammerhead"
    - 2nd Squadron, 6th Cavalry Regiment (AH-64) "Lightning Horse"
    - 209th Aviation Support Battalion (ASB) "Lobos"
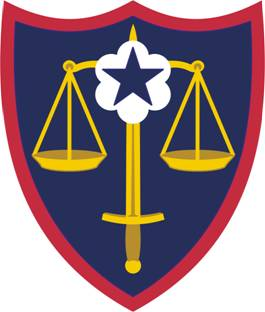
  - Trial Defense Service-Hawaii
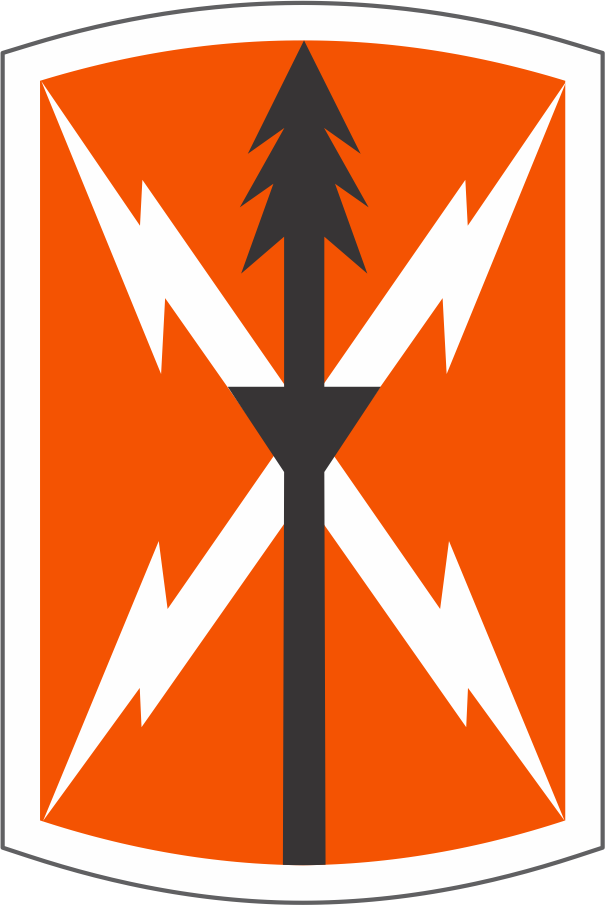
  - 516th Theater Signal Brigade
    - HHD, 30th Signal Battalion "Berserkers"
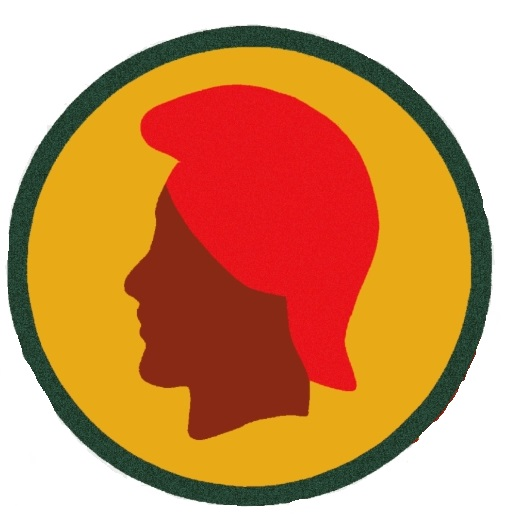
  - Hawaii Army National Guard
    - 193rd Aviation Regiment (Medium Lift)
    - Detachment 3, Company C, 2nd Battalion, 641st Aviation Regiment (formally Det 55 OSA)
- Air Force
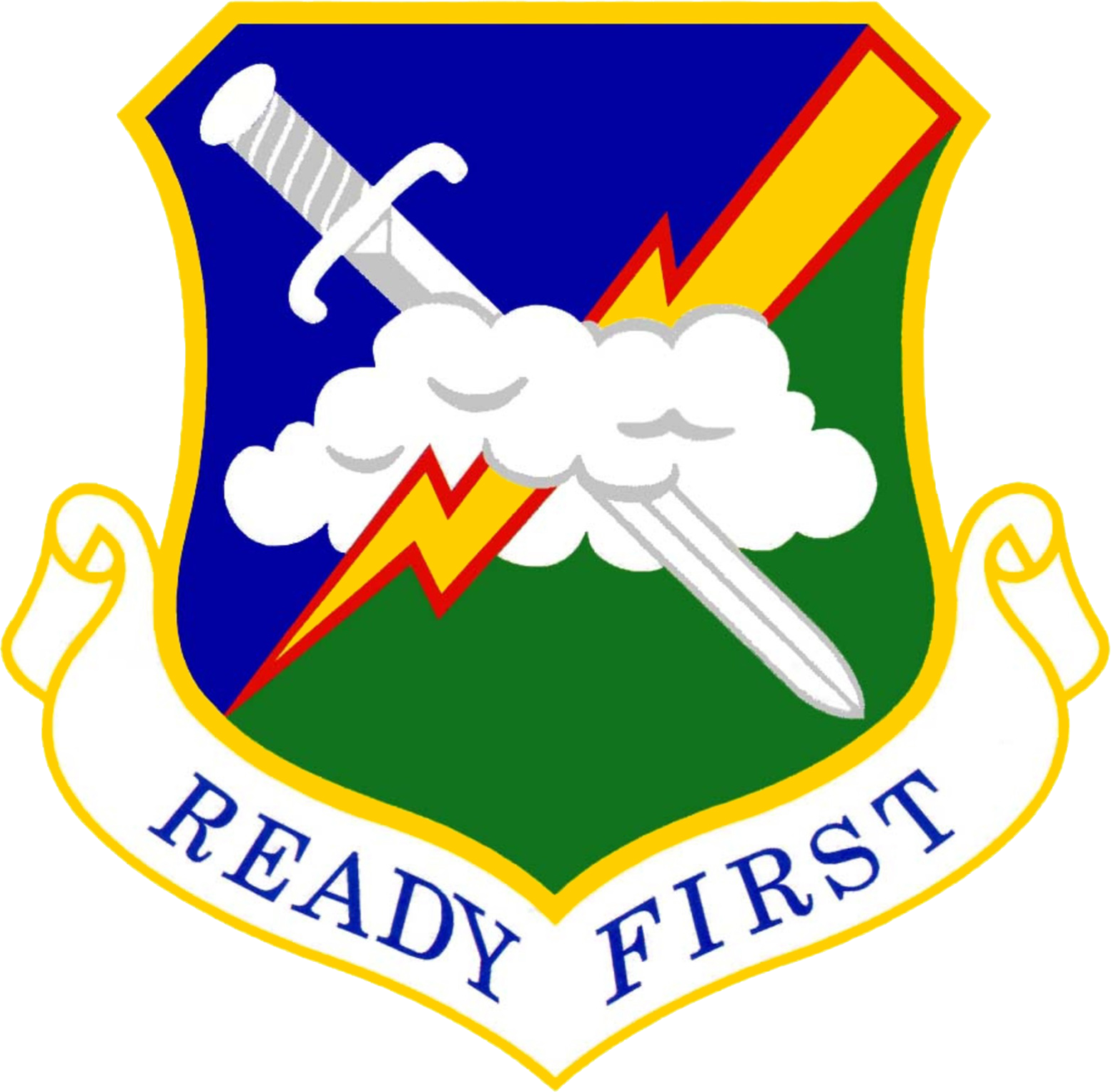
  - 1st Air Support Operations Group
    - 25th Air Support Operations Squadron
  - Detachment 2, 1st Combat Weather Squadron
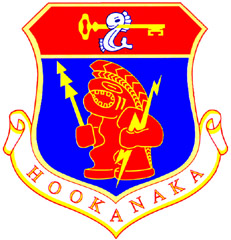
  - Hawaii Air National Guard
    - 169th Aircraft Control & Warning Squadron (169 ACWS)

== Education ==
Hawaii Department of Education operates Major Sheldon Wheeler Elementary School and Major Sheldon Wheeler Middle School on Wheeler AAF. As of 2016 the zoned high school is Leilehua High School.

== See also ==
- Hawaii World War II Army Airfields
- Phil Rasmussen
