= 41st Tactical Group =

41st Tactical Group

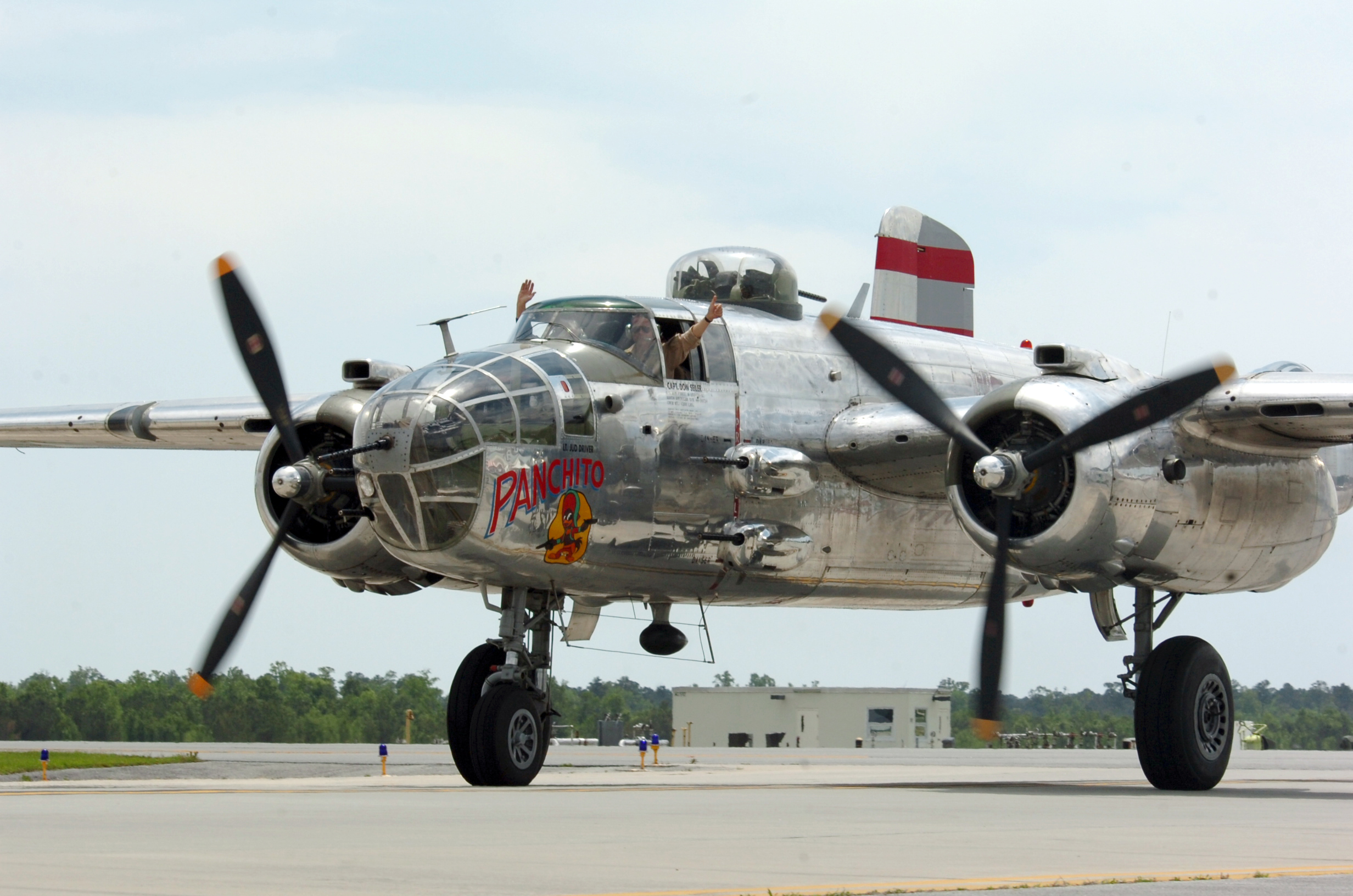
- Rag Wings and Radials' B-25J is restored as "Panchito." It served with the 396th Bomb Squadron, 41st Bomb Group, 7th Air Force, stationed in the Central Pacific.
- Active: 1940–1946; 1966–1970
- Country: United States
- Branch: United States Air Force
- Role: Medium Bombardment, control of deployed forces
- Part of: United States Air Forces Europe
- Engagements: Pacific Theater of World War II

The 41st Tactical Group is an inactive United States Air Force unit. Its last assignment was with the 7217th Air Division at Cigli Air Base, Turkey, where it was inactivated in 1970. From 1966 to 1970 the group controlled deployed fighter squadrons.

During World War II, the unit was a North American B-25 Mitchell unit serving with Seventh Air Force in the Pacific. It was inactivated in January 1946 at Manila, Philippines.

During the Okinawa Campaign, the group began the first sustained medium bombardment strikes against the main islands of Japan. It established its facilities and operated its aircraft under the most hazardous field conditions. Undeterred by either the constant rain during April and May or by heavy enemy artillery shelling and repeated day and night aerial bombing of the air strips, the unit succeeded in carrying out highly effective aerial operations against the enemy from Kyushu to the southernmost island of the Ryukyu Group, flying reconnaissance and search missions, escort missions, day and night bomber strikes.

== History ==
The 41st Bombardment Group was activated 15 January 1941 at March Field, California. Its components were the 46th, 47th, and 48th Bombardment Squadrons. Attached to the 19th Bombardment Group for training, the 41st received a cadre of 4 officers and 120 enlisted men from the parent organization. During February the Group received additional personnel, and four months after activation it received its first aircraft, one PT-17 for each squadron. In June, two B-18s were assigned to each squadron. Meanwhile, on 14 May the Group moved to Tucson, where it grew to a third of its authorized strength. It was not until after it moved to the Muroc Bombing and Gunnery Range, California, four days after the attack on Pearl Harbor, that the Group received a full complement of personnel and equipment. Within a month, a large increment of pilots had arrived from flying school and 45 A-29s had been assigned to the Group.

=== Antisubmarine patrols ===
On 26 February, the 41st moved to Hammer Field, Fresno, California. In addition to training its pilots and ground crews, the Group also assisted in patrolling the coastal waters for enemy submarines. In May, the 46th Bombardment Squadron moved to Alameda, California, where the pilots assisted the Navy in patrol duty. Later in the same year the 48th moved to Alameda and continued its patrol work.

Meanwhile, the composition of the Group had changed. The 6th Reconnaissance Squadron (later redesignated the 396th Bombardment Squadron) was assigned during March 1942. Headquarters Squadron was disbanded in July 1942. During the following year, in March 1943, the 46th was reassigned, and in October the 820th took its place in the Group. Thus the Group consisted of the 47th, 48th, 396th, and 820th Bombardment Squadrons.

By mid-1943 the military situation in the Pacific had changed considerably. The United States was no longer on the defensive. Units which had been employed to defend the west coast might now be diverted to the Pacific to press the attack against the enemy. A projected offensive against the Japanese in the Central Pacific required that the Seventh Air Force be augmented by one heavy and one medium bombardment group. In order to fill one those requirements, the Army Air Force decided to place the 41st under the jurisdiction of the Seventh Air Force.

The 41st Bombardment Group moved from California to Hawaii during October 1943. At Oahu Hawaii, the men of the 41st were briefed on how to live in the tropics. Meanwhile, in the Central Pacific, the carrier fleets began the preliminary bombardment of the Gilbert Islands. On 20 November, the Marines charged ashore on the beaches of Tarawa, the most strategic of the enemy held islands in the Gilberts. After 72 hours of bitter fighting the island was secured and the United States forces had acquired a base from which it could launch an attack against the next island group, the Marshalls.

=== Central Pacific ===
The 41st moved from Hawaii and on 17 December arrived at Tarawa. Before the Group could mount its own offensive however, the rubble caused by the recent fighting had to be cleared away and the airstrips repaired. The uncomfortable climate, the temporary delay, and an outbreak of dengue fever and dysentery combined to make life miserable for the men of the 41st. Frequent Japanese nuisance raids added to the sense of helpless frustration. On 28 December, the 820th Squadron launched the Group's combat mission with an attack on the new enemy air facilities at Mili Atoll in the Marshall Islands. During the month of January 1944 the Group conducted 215 sorties against the Japanese positions in the Marshalls. Maloelap, Wotje, Mili, and Jaluit became familiar to the crews of the B-25s. Those islands contained air facilities from which the Japanese might interfere with the scheduled invasions of Kwajalein and Eniwetok set for February 1944. In low-level attacks, the medium bombers of the 41st effectively raked Japanese installations and shipping. The raids however, were made at a high cost for the unit. Enemy opposition, particularly over Maloelap, was stiff, and at times as many as 50 enemy fighters rose to challenge the Group's formations. Between 28 December and 12 February the Group lost 17 B-25s.

During February, the offensive continued with the seizure of Kwajalein and Eniwetok atolls. The capture of Eniwetok gave the medium bombers a base of operations for attacks on the strategically important island of Ponape, located 400 miles west of Eniwetok in the eastern Caroline Islands. The Group concentrated on neutralizing the bypassed islands in the Marshalls, but flights were staged from Engebi Island in the Eniwetok Atoll to attack enemy shipping in the Carolines.

In an attempt to lower its losses on the bombing raids, the Group switched from low level altitude to medium and high altitude approaches over the target areas. The change of tactics, plus the fact that the Japanese air forces were greatly diminishing, resulted in a significant decline the number of losses incurred by the 41st. In April, the Group initiated a series of shuttle runs. Proceeding from the base at Tarawa, the B-25s struck at Mili and Jaluit, landed and reloaded at Majuro Airfield, bombed Maloelap and Wotje, returned to Majuro, and bombed Mili and Jaluit on the way back to Tarawa. On each trip the B-25s struck 6 targets on 3 separate missions. The shuttle bombing made it possible for the 41st to push its combat total to 98 missions for the month of April.

Upon completion of the Marshall invasions, United States forces had pushed to a point about midway between Pearl Harbor and Japan. By June, invasion forces were assembled the attack on the Mariana Islands, the next island group on the way to the Japanese homeland. On 15 June the Marines landed on Saipan and three weeks later the island was considered secure for American forces. Within another week, the Seventh Air Force moved the 48th Bombardment Squadron to Saipan to assist in softening up enemy defenses preparatory to the next invasions in the Marianas. For a week the 48th Squadron and other units bombarded Guam and Tinian. Then on 21 July, United States forces invaded Guam and three days later invaded Tinian. For the next three weeks, the 48th rendered close support to the ground forces by strafing and bombing enemy positions. On 19 August, the 48th Squadron returned to the Group, which was now located at Makin in the Gilbert Islands. Meanwhile, the remainder of the 41st Group continued the monotonous routine of neutralizing enemy bases in the Marshalls and raiding enemy targets in the eastern Carolines.

=== Far East Air Forces ===
By the Fall of 1944, the medium bombers of the 41st were no longer needed in the Central Pacific, so the Seventh Air Force withdrew the Group to Wheeler Field, Hawaii in October 1944. For seven months the Group remained in Hawaii, flying antisubmarine patrols and training missions. The crews practiced bombing, using a newer model B-25, and acquainted themselves with the capabilities of rockets, which had replaced the 75mm cannon of the older B-25s. New gunnery techniques were also employed during practice on tow targets, and gun cameras were used during maneuvers with local fighters.

In 1945, the United States mounted a new offensive, this time against the islands on the periphery of the Japanese homeland. The United States launched the bitter battle at Iwo Jima in February 1945 and attacked Okinawa in April. In June 1945, while fighting still raged on Okinawa, the 41st Group moved from Hawaii to an airfield near Kadena. The B-25s hit Japanese air facilities nearby in an attempt to neutralize enemy islands and troop concentrations. During July, the Group flew 36 missions, dropping fragmentation and general-purpose bombs on enemy airfields, bridges, railroads, and shipping facilities. When the fighting subsided, the medium bombers struck at targets outside the Ryukyus. Chiran Airfield on Kyushu was hit by B-25s, and in a raid over the China mainland the Group bombed the enemy held Chang Wan Airfield near Shanghai. The 41st also raided enemy shipping in an attempt to tighten a blockade of the Japanese home islands. On 22 July, the unit and two other groups bombed an enemy convoy at the mouth of the Yangtze River in China. New tactics against Japanese shipping included an experiment with glide bombs against targets in Sasebo, Makurasaki, and Nagasaki harbors. The 41st conducted 11 more missions against targets on Kyushu during the first twelve days of August 1945.

=== Inactivation ===
The end of the war came in August, and the Group moved to Morotai. Two weeks later another move was made to Machinato Airfield on Okinawa, where the unit's activity consisted of routine training flights and maintenance checks. Demobilization began during September, and by October many of the unit's veterans had departed. The dismantling of the Group continued. During the month its planes were transferred to Clark Field in the Philippines. In November, only a skeleton force remained. The 47th and 48th Squadrons were reduced to a one and one status, and the 396th was converted into a service unit for Seventh Air Force units operating in the Machinato area. In December, the Group was transferred to the Philippines, where inactivation occurred on 27 January 1946.

=== Control of deployed units ===
The group was redesignated the 41st Tactical Group and activated At Cigli Air Base, Turkey in April 1966, where it replaced the 7231st Combat Support Group controlling tactical fighter squadrons deploying to Cigli. The squadron was inactivated in July 1970 as United States Air Force deployments were concentrated at Incirlik Air Base. The 7241 Support Squadron assumed the remaining personnel and equipment of the group until American operations at the base ended.

== Lineage ==
- Constituted as the 41st Bombardment Group (Medium) on 20 November 1940.

Activated on 15 January 1941.
Redesignated 41st Bombardment Group, Medium in 1944
Inactivated on 27 January 1946

- Redesignated 41st Tactical Group on 14 March 1966

Activated on 1 April 1966
Inactivated on 1 July 1970

=== Assignments ===
- 1st Bombardment Wing, 15 January 1941
- IV Bomber Command, c. December 1941
- VII Bomber Command, c. 16 October 1943
- Seventh Air Force, c. January 1944
- VII Bomber Command, c. 7 June 1945
- Thirteenth Air Force, c. 13 December 1945 – 27 January 1946
- 7217th Air Division, 1 April 1966 – 1 July 1970

=== Components ===
- 6th Reconnaissance Squadron (later 396th Bombardment Squadron), attached: 15 January 1941 – 24 February 1942, assigned 25 February 1942 – 27 January 1946
- 46th Bombardment Squadron, 15 January 1941 – 3 March 1943 (air echelon attached to Army Air Forces Antisubmarine Command 13 October 1942, 25th Antisubmarine Wing after 20 November 1942)
- 47th Bombardment Squadron: 15 January 1941 – 27 January 1946
- 48th Bombardment Squadron: 15 January 1941 – 27 January 1946
- 76th Bombardment Squadron: 12 February – 3 March 1943
- 406th Bombardment Squadron: 25 February – 11 October 1943 (detached to 28th Composite Group)
- 820th Bombardment Squadron: 11 October 1943 – 4 January 1946
- 309th Tactical Fighter Squadron: 1–24 April 1966

=== Stations ===
- March Field, California, 15 January 1941
- Davis-Monthan Field, Arizona, May 1941
- Muroc Bombing Range, California, c. 10 December 1941
- Hammer Field, California, February 1942 – 29 September 1943
- Hickam Field, Hawaii, 16 October 1943
- Hawkins Field (Tarawa), Tarawa, 17 December 1943 – 28 January 1944
- Bairiki (Mullinix) Airfield, Tarawa, 28 January – 5 April 1944
- Makin Airfield, Makin, Gilbert Islands, 24 April 1944
- Wheeler Field, Hawaii Territory, 14 October 1944
- Yontan Airfield, Okinawa, 7 June 1945
- Fort William McKinley, Luzon, Philippines, 13 December 1945 – 27 January 1946
- Cigli Air Base, Turkey1 April 1966 – 1 July 1970

=== Aircraft ===
- Douglas B-18 Bolo, 1942–1943
- Lockheed A-29 Hudson, 1942–1943
- North American B-25 Mitchell, 1942–1946
