= Visalia Municipal Airport =

Visalia Municipal Airport Visalia Army Air Field

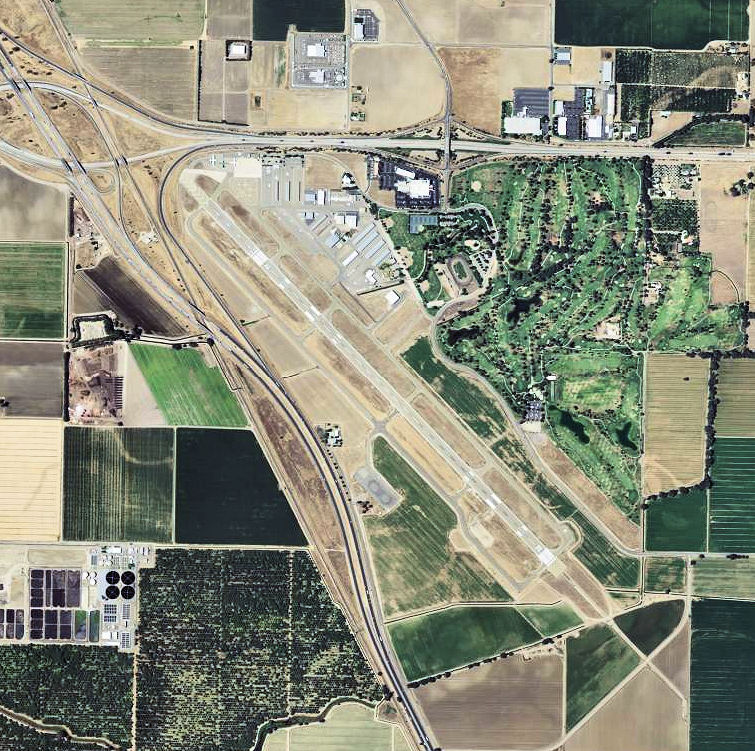
- USGS 2006 orthophoto
- IATA: VIS; ICAO: KVIS; FAA LID: VIS

Summary
- Airport type: Public
- Owner: City of Visalia
- Serves: Visalia, California
- Elevation AMSL: 295 ft (90 m)
- Coordinates: 36°19′07″N 119°23′34″W
- Website: visalia.city/depts/general_services/airport

Map
- Location within California Location within the United States

Runways
Direction	Length		Surface
Direction	ft	m	Surface
12/30	6,562	2,000	Asphalt

Helipads
Number	Length		Surface
Number	ft	m	Surface
H1	45	14	Asphalt

Statistics (2022)
- Aircraft operations (year ending 3/22/2022): 32,500
- Based aircraft: 161
- Source: Federal Aviation Administration

Visalia Municipal Airport (IATA: VIS, ICAO: KVIS, FAA LID: VIS) was the first airport in Tulare County, California, United States, designated in 1929. The airport is 5 mi (8.0 km) west of downtown Visalia. The airport is eligible for the Essential Air Service program, but has no scheduled air service, having previously been ineligible to request funding for service until April 30, 2026.

The Federal Aviation Administration says this airport had 1,831 passenger boardings (enplanements) in calendar year 2010, a decrease from 2,455 in 2009. The National Plan of Integrated Airport Systems for 2011–2015 categorized it as a general aviation airport (the commercial service category requires 2,500 enplanements per year).

== History ==
In June 1928, the city of Visalia approved a bond measure to purchase Putnam Field, a cow pasture owned by J.F. and Elizabeth Putnam. A year earlier, the field was the location of an emergency landing by local pilots Solomon Sweet and Edwin Deeds; subsequently, Sweet promoted the location to the Visalia Chamber of Commerce. On January 9, 1929, the city officially renamed the field Visalia Municipal Airport, making it the first airport in Tulare County.

The Works Progress Administration (WPA) began several projects at the Visalia Municipal Airport in 1936, and would continue to make improvements at the field.

The War Department assumed control of the airport in February 1942, just weeks after Japan's attack on Pearl Harbor, which led the United States to enter World War II. The airport was renamed the Visalia Army Air Field (Visalia AAF) and operations at the facility began almost immediately upon the United States Army Air Forces control of the airfield. Anti-submarine patrols were conducted from Visalia AAF by the 47th Bombardment Squadron (Medium) using Lockheed A-29 Hudson, and later B-25 Mitchell medium bombers.

In June 1942, the Visalia AAF was established as a sub-installations of the newly built Hammer Field in Fresno (along with Hayward AAF and Palmdale AAF). It shared Hammer Field's mission to train light, medium and heavy bomber squadrons. During that period Consolidated B-24 Liberator, North American B-25 Mitchells, Martin B-26 Marauder and the A-29s operated from Visalia AAF.

In January 1944, Army Air Forces headquarters ordered the entire Air University night fighter training program to California to be headquartered at Hammer Field. Under the supervision of the Army Air Force School of Applied Tactics (AAFSAT) and the 481st Night Fighter Operational Training Group, night fighter crews were organized into Overseas Training Units and entered three phases of training. In all phases, Visalia AAF was used as a satellite training site. During this period, Douglas P-70 "Nighthawk" (heavy night fighter version of the A-20 "Havoc" light bomber) and Northrop P-61 "Black Widow" operated from Visalia AAF. It is known that the 425th Night Fighter Squadron was stationed at Visalia AAF for its entire training cycle from February until May 1944 when it was deployed to the European Theater at RAF Charmy Down, England as part of the Ninth Air Force.

In 1946 the War Assets Administration, acting on behalf of the War Department, terminated the leases with the City of Visalia and other parties with the remainder of the lands transferred to the City of Visalia between 1946 and 1947.

United Airlines mainline flights began in 1946 and ended in November 1979.

After the deregulation of the airline industry in 1978, Visalia Municipal Airport became eligible for the Essential Air Service (EAS) program. Since then Air Midwest, Great Lakes Airlines, Scenic Airlines, SeaPort Airlines, SkyWest Airlines, Swift Aire Lines, and Wings West Airlines served the airport with EAS funding support, but none were successful.

SeaPort Airlines was the most recent airline at Visalia. Starting February 9, 2015, SeaPort operated 12 nonstop round trips a week to Burbank and Sacramento. The airline suspended its service without notice on January 15, 2016.

After the abrupt cancellation of commercial air service, the US Department of Transportation received proposals from three other airlines to start service from Visalia using EAS funding, but the city rejected the offers, believing that none of the carriers had a strong enough proposal. Instead, in January 2017, the city asked to be enrolled in the Essential Air Service Community Flexibility Pilot Program which allows communities to receive a cash grant equal to two years worth of subsidy in exchange for forgoing their EAS funding for the next ten years. Visalia was the first community ever to enroll in the program which had been established more than a decade earlier in 2003. In March 2017, Visalia received a grant worth $3,703,368 for the construction of two 10-unit tee hangars to serve small single-engine aircraft, and one corporate hangar to serve business jets and large aircraft. In exchange, the city was ineligible to receive EAS subsidy funding for service until April 30, 2026.

Visalia Transit operates the V-LINE bus service connecting the Visalia Airport to Downtown Visalia, Downtown Fresno, California State University, Fresno and the Fresno Yosemite International Airport. The route started on November 18, 2015, but since the cancellation of commercial air service in Visalia, free extended parking (up to 10 days) has been offered at the Visalia Airport main terminal lot, where one can then ride the bus to Fresno's airport.

== Facilities ==
Visalia Municipal Airport covers 821 acres (332 ha) at an elevation of 295 feet (90 m). It has one asphalt runway, 12/30, 6,562 by 150 feet (2,000 x 46 m), and one helipad 45 by 45 feet (14 x 14 m).

In the year ending March 22, 2022, the airport had 32,500 aircraft operations, average 89 per day: 95% general aviation, 3% air taxi, and 2% military. 161 aircraft were then based at this airport: 120 single-engine, 36 multi-engine, 2 jet, 2 helicopters, and 1 glider.

== Airlines and destinations ==
=== Cargo ===
Airlines	Destinations
Ameriflight	Ontario
Fedex Express	Oakland, Fresno

== See also ==
- California World War II Army Airfields
