= United States Army Air Forces in the Central Pacific Area =

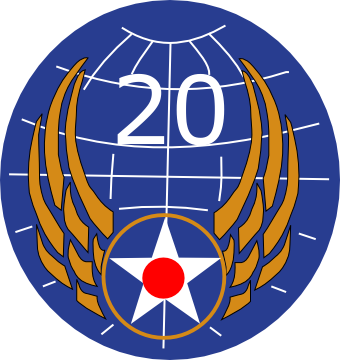
Airfields of the United States Army Air Force in the Central Pacific Area
- Part of World War II
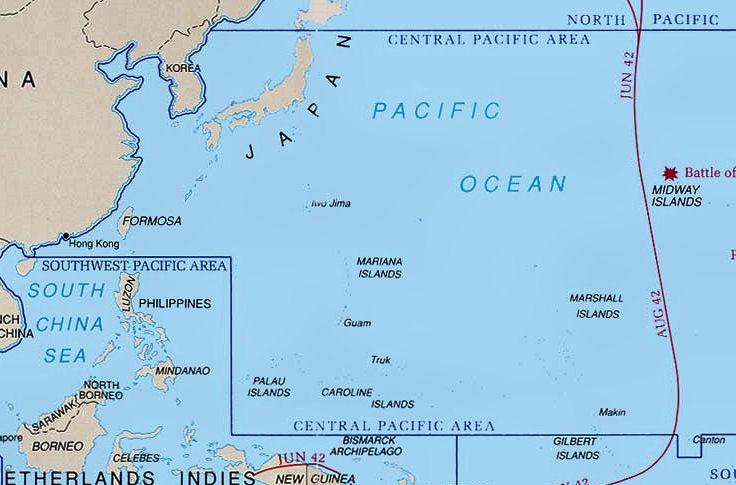
Date	1942–1945
Location	Central Pacific Area of World War II
Result	Allied victory over the Empire of Japan (1945)

During World War II, the United States Army Air Forces fought the Empire of Japan in the Central Pacific Area. As defined by the War Department, this consisted of most of the Pacific Ocean and its islands, excluding the Philippines, Australia, the Netherlands East Indies, the Territory of New Guinea (including the Bismarck Archipelago) the Solomon Islands and areas to the south and east of the Solomons.

The initial USAAF combat organization in the region was Seventh Air Force, which was originally formed in Hawaii as the Army Air defense command for the islands. After the Pearl Harbor Attack on 7 December 1941, Seventh Air Force retained the mission of its predecessor of the defense of the Hawaiian Islands and until the closing months of the war it maintained its headquarters at Hickam Field. The command however, deployed most of its combat units to the Central Pacific.

As the war progressed, some Seventh Air Force units moved into the South West Pacific theatre and coordinated their activities with Fifth and Thirteenth Air Force units in New Guinea, Netherlands East Indies and Philippines during 1944 and 1945.

In 1944, Twentieth Air Force was reassigned from the China Burma India Theater to bases in the Marianas chain of islands, consisting primarily of Saipan, Tinian, and Guam. The Marianas airfields were considered as being ideal bases from which to launch B-29 Superfortress operations against Japan. The islands were about 1500 miles from Tokyo, a range which the B-29s could just about manage. Most important of all, they could be put on a direct supply line from western United States ports by ship.

In September 1945, just after the Surrender of Japan, a few advance elements of Eighth Air Force arrived on Tinian and Guam. Eighth Air Force was transferred from England to be a second strategic air force in the Pacific War, with a mission to carry out B-29 attacks on the Japanese Home Islands during the planned Invasion of Japan beginning in November 1945. These advance units were reassigned to other stations in December 1945.

Seventh Air Force operations focused on supporting Army and Naval forces in the tactical campaigns against Japanese forces in the Central Pacific, while Twentieth Air Force performed strategic bombing missions directly against the Japanese home islands.

== Airfields and unit assignments ==
BAKER ISLAND

- Baker Island Airfield, Baker Island

00°11′41″N 176°28′46″W
45th Fighter Squadron, 15th Fighter Group, 1 September-27 November 1943

CAROLINE ISLANDS

- Angaur Airfield, Angaur, Palau Islands, Caroline Islands

06°54′22.50″N 134°08′41.87″E
Seventh Air Force
22d Bombardment Group, Heavy, 26 November 1944 – 20 January 1945

2d Bombardment Squadron, Heavy, 28 November 1944 – 19 January 1945
19th Bombardment Squadron, Heavy, 2 December 1944 – 26 January 1945
33d Bombardment Squadron, Heavy, 26 November 1944 – 20 January 1945
408th Bombardment Squadron, Heavy, 1 December 1944 – 13 January 1945

494th Bombardment Group, Heavy, 30 September 1944 – 23 June 1945

864th Bombardment Squadron, Heavy, 30 September 1944 – 23 June 1945
865th Bombardment Squadron, Heavy, 30 September 1944 – 23 June 1945
866th Bombardment Squadron, Heavy, 30 September 1944 – 23 June 1945
867th Bombardment Squadron, Heavy, 30 September 1944 – 23 June 1945

- Peleliu Airfield, Peleliu, Palau Islands, Caroline Islands

06°59′54.44″N 134°13′57.98″E
Seventh Air Force
28th Photographic Reconnaissance Squadron, Detachment, VII Fighter Command, 5 October 1944 – April 1945

GILBERT ISLANDS

- Abemama Airfield, Abamama Atoll, Gilbert Islands

0°29′27″N 173°49′43″E
Seventh Air Force
30th Bombardment Group, Heavy 4 January–19 March 1944

27th Bombardment Squadron, Heavy, operated from Abemama 26 February-14 March 1944
392d Bombardment Squadron, Heavy, 10 January-16 March 1944

9th Troop Carrier Squadron, Seventh Air Force, 27 March–3 August 1944
47th Bombardment Squadron (Medium), 41st Bombardment Group (Medium), 22 December 1943 – 20 April 1944
48th Bombardment Squadron (Medium), 41st Bombardment Group (Medium), 22 December 1943 – 23 April 1944

- Bonriki Airfield (Mullinix Field). Bonriki Island, Tarawa Atoll, Gilbert Islands

01°22′53.89″N 173°08′49.33″E
Seventh Air Force
Headquarters, VII Bomber Command, January–March 1944
11th Bombardment Group (Heavy), 28 January–4 April 1944

26th Bombardment Squadron (Heavy), 25 January-13 April 1944
98th Bombardment Squadron (Heavy), 20 January-2 April 1944
431st Bombardment Squadron (Heavy), 16 January-30 March 1944

41st Bombardment Group (Medium), 17 December 1943 – 23 April 1944

396th Bombardment Squadron (Medium), 28 January-19 April 1944
820th Bombardment Squadron (Medium), 24 December 1943 – 26 April 1944

- Makin Airfield, Butaritari Island, Makin Atoll, Gilbert Islands

03°05′12.48″N 172°48′47.74″E
Seventh Air Force
41st Bombardment Group (Medium), 24 April-13 October 1944

47th Bombardment Squadron (Medium), 41st Bombardment Group (Medium), 21 April-4 November 1944
48th Bombardment Squadron (Medium), 41st Bombardment Group (Medium), 24 April-13 October 1944 (operated from Saipan 23 July-21 August 1944)
396th Bombardment Squadron (Medium), 41st Bombardment Group (Medium), 24 December 1943 – 19 April 1944
820th Bombardment Squadron (Medium), 27 April-13 October 1944

38th Bombardment Squadron, Heavy, 30th Bombardment Group, Heavy,(operated from Makin Atoll 26 February-22 March 1944)
531st Fighter Bomber Squadron, Seventh Air Force, 18 December 1943 – 17 February 1944
531st Fighter Squadron, Seventh Air Force, 18 February–March 1944

- Hawkins Field (Tarawa), Betio Island, Tarawa Atoll, Gilbert Islands

01°21′22.49″N 172°55′48.39″E
Seventh Air Force
Headquarters, VII Bomber Command, January 1944
11th Bombardment Group (Heavy), 14–27 January 1944

HAWAIIAN ISLANDS

HAWAII ISLAND

Seventh Air Force

- General Lyman Field, Hawaii, Hawaiian Islands

19°43′13″N 155°02′55″W
45th Fighter Squadron, 15th Fighter Group, 20 October-19 December 1942
46th Fighter Squadron, 15th Fighter Group, 16 December 1942 – 19 March 1943
72d Fighter Squadron, 15th Fighter Group, 25 July-21 October 1943
86th Observation Squadron, 7th Air Force, June-17 August 1942
333d Fighter Squadron, 318th Fighter Group, 6 April-27 July 1943

KAUAI ISLAND

Seventh Air Force

- Barking Sands Field, Kauai, Hawaiian Islands

22°01′22″N 159°47′06″W
494th Bombardment Group (Heavy), 15 June-29 September 1944

864th Bombardment Squadron (Heavy), 15 June-29 September 1944
865th Bombardment Squadron (Heavy), 15 June-29 September 1944
866th Bombardment Squadron (Heavy), 15 June-29 September 1944
867th Bombardment Squadron (Heavy), 15 June-29 September 1944

47th Fighter Squadron, 15th Fighter Group, 29 July-7 November 1942
78th Fighter Squadron, 15th Fighter Group, 23 April-30 July 1943
392d Bombardment Squadron (Heavy), 30th Bombardment Group (Heavy), 20 October-9 November 1943
819th Bombardment Squadron (Heavy), 30th Bombardment Group (Heavy), 22 October-11 November 1943

MOLOKAI ISLAND

Seventh Air Force

- Homestead Field, Molokai, Hawaiian Islands

21°09′11″N 157°05′47″W

OAHU ISLAND

- Bellows Field, Oahu, Hawaiian Islands

21°21′13″N 157°42′56″W
318th Fighter Group, 9 February 1943-Jun 1944

19th Fighter Squadron, 18 April-19 June 1944
44th Fighter Squadron, 15–23 October 1942

19th Pursuit Squadron (Interceptor), 18th Pursuit Group (Interceptor), 20 February-14 May 1942
19th Fighter Squadron, 18th Fighter Group 15–21 May 1942 and 20 October 1942 – 8 February 1943
26th Bombardment Squadron (Heavy), 11th Bombardment Group (Heavy), 8 April-10 May 1943
44th Pursuit Squadron (Interceptor), 18th Pursuit Group (Interceptor), 7 November-11 December 1941
44th Fighter Squadron, 18th Fighter Group, 23 June-14 October 1942
45th Fighter Squadron, 15th Fighter Group, 14–31 August 1943 and 19 June 1944 – 5 February 1945
47th Pursuit Squadron (Fighter), 15th Pursuit Group (Fighter), 22 February-24 March 1942
47th Fighter Squadron, 15th Fighter Group, 8 June 1944 – 27 January 1945
58th Bombardment Squadron, (Light), Hawaiian Air Force, 18 March-29 April 1941 and 11–18 December 1941
72d Bombardment Squadron (Heavy), 5th Bombardment Group (Heavy), 11 December 1941 – 18 September 1942
73d Fighter Squadron, 318th Fighter Group, 22 May-16 June 1942 and 8 November 1943 – 22 June 1944
78th Fighter Squadron, 15th Fighter Group, 8 June 1944 – 24 January 1945
86th Observation Squadron, Hawaiian Air Force, 15 March 1941 – 2 February 1942
86th Observation Squadron, 7th Air Force, 3 February–June 1942
333d Fighter Squadron, 18th Fighter Group, 23 August-10 September 1942
333d Fighter Squadron, 318th Fighter Group, 28 July 1943 – 5 July 1944
394th Bombardment Squadron (Heavy), 5th Bombardment Group (Heavy), 30 May-23 July 1942 and 28 September-17 November 1942
531st Fighter Squadron, Seventh Air Force, March-20 April 1944

- Fort Kamehameha, Oahu, Hawaiian Islands

21°19′34″N 157°57′34″W
Seventh Air Force
Headquarters, VII Fighter Command, 18 January–March 1945

- Fort Shafter, Oahu, Hawaiian Islands

21°20′58″N 157°53′24″W
Headquarters Hawaiian Air Force, Hawaiian Department, U.S. Army, 1 November 1940 – 4 February 1942
Headquarters 7th Air Force, Hawaiian Department, U.S. Army, 5 February-17 September 1942
Headquarters Seventh Air Force, Hawaiian Department, U.S. Army, 18 September 1942 – 15 August 1943; U.S. Army Forces in Central Pacific Area, c. 16 Aug 1943 – 31 July 1944; and Army Air Forces, Pacific Ocean Areas, 1 Aug 1944 – 18 December 1944

Headquarters, VII Interceptor Command, 2 February-14 May 1942
Headquarters, VII Fighter Command, 15 May 1942 – 19 October 1944
Headquarters, 7th Fighter Wing, 21 April 1944 – 17 November 1946

- Haleiwa Field, Oahu, Hawaiian Islands

21°36′16″N 158°06′08″W
45th Pursuit Squadron (Fighter), 15th Pursuit Group (Fighter), 21–26 December 1941
47th Pursuit Squadron (Fighter), 15th Pursuit Group Fighter). 25 March-15 May 1942
47th Fighter Squadron, 15th Fighter Group, 15 May 1942 – 29 July 1943
72d Fighter Squadron, 15th Fighter Group, 23 April-7 June 1943
78th Fighter Squadron, 15th Fighter Group, 31 July 1943 – 5 January 1944

- Hickam Field, Oahu, Hawaiian Islands

21°20′02″N 157°56′54″W
Seventh Air Force
Headquarters, Army Air Forces, Pacific Ocean Areas, 1 August 1944 – 31 January 1945
Headquarters, Hawaiian Air Force, 1 November 1940 – 2 February 1942
Headquarters, 7th Air Force, 3 February-17 September 1942
Headquarters, Seventh Air Force, 18 September 1942 – 12 December 1944
Headquarters, VII Bomber Command, 29 January 1942-November 1943
Headquarters, VII Fighter Command, 20 October 1944 – 17 January 1945
Headquarters, 18th Wing, 30 October 1937 – 18 October 1940
Headquarters, 18th Bombardment Wing, 19 October 1940 – 29 January 1942
5th Bombardment Group (Heavy), 1 January 1939 – 30 November 1942

4th Reconnaissance Squadron (Heavy), 1 January 1939 – 21 April 1942
23d Bombardment Squadron (Heavy), 1 January 1939 – 23 March 1942
31st Bombardment Squadron (Heavy), 8 February 1938 – 22 May 1942
72d Bombardment Squadron (Heavy), 4 January 1939 – 10 December 1941
394th Bombardment Squadron (Heavy), 22 April-29 May 1942 and 24 July-27 September 1942

11th Bombardment Group (Heavy), 1 February 1940 – 21 July 1942

26th Bombardment Squadron (Heavy), 1 February 1940 – 19 December 1941
42d Bombardment Squadron (Heavy), 1 February 1940 – 4 June 1942
50th Reconnaissance Squadron (Heavy), 9 October 1939 – 21 April 1942
98th Bombardment Squadron (Heavy), 16 December 1941 – 10 August 1942
431st Bombardment Squadron (Heavy), 22 April-23 July 1942 and 8 April-10 November 1943

30th Bombardment Group (Heavy), 20 October-11 November 1943
41st Bombardment Group (Medium), 16 October-16 December 1943

47th Bombardment Squadron (Medium), 26 October-21 December 1943
48th Bombardment Squadron (Medium), 20 October-21 December 1943
396th Bombardment Squadron (Medium), 20 October-23 December 1943
820th Bombardment Squadron (Medium), 20 October-23 December 1943

307th Bombardment Group (Heavy), 1 November 1942-February 1943
318th Fighter Group, 15 October 1942 – 8 February 1943
19th Transport Squadron, Hawaiian Air Force, 1 January 1941 – 2 February 1942
19th Transport Squadron, 7th Air Force, 3 February-28 May 1942
22d Bombardment Squadron (Heavy), 7th Bombardment Group (Heavy) (22 December 1941 – 18 January 1942) (air echelon only; ground echelon at Brisbane, Queensland, Australia)
46th Pursuit Squadron (Fighter), 15th Pursuit Group (Fighter), 6 February-14 May 1942
46th Fighter Squadron, 15th Fighter Group, 15–21 May 1942
58th Bombardment Squadron (Light), Hawaiian Air Force, 30 April-10 December 1941
548th Night Fighter Squadron, VII Fighter Command, 16 September-15 October 1944

- John Rogers Field, Oahu, Hawaiian Islands

21°19′07″N 157°55′31″W
Seventh Air Force
6th Night Fighter Squadron, 15th Fighter Group, 3 March-5 June 1944
6th Night Fighter Squadron, VII Fighter Command, 5 June-27 October 1944
19th Transport Squadron. 7th Air Force. 29 May-4 July 1942
19th Troop Carrier Squadron. 7th Air Force. 5 July-17 September 1942
19th Troop Carrier Squadron. Seventh Air Force. 19 September 1942 – 14 August 1944
19th Troop Carrier Squadron. VI Air Service Area Command. 15 August 1944 – 14 December 1945
22d Bombardment Squadron (Heavy), (18 December 1941 – 18 January 1942) (air echelon; ground echelon at Brisbane, Queensland, Australia)

- Kahuku Field, Oahu, Hawaiian Islands

21°42′15″N 157°58′02″W
Seventh Air Force
508th Fighter Group, 6 January-24 February 1945

466th Fighter Squadron, 6 January-24 February 1945
467th Fighter Squadron, 6 January-2 March 1945
468th Fighter Squadron, 6 January-2 March 1945

6th Fighter Squadron, 18th Fighter Group, 30 August-16 November 1942
38th Bombardment Squadron (Heavy), 30th Bombardment Group (Heavy), 20 October-11 November 1943
42d Bombardment Squadron (Heavy), 11th Bombardment Group (Heavy), 19 Mary-22 June 1944
43d Reconnaissance Squadron (Long Range, Photographic), U.S. Army Strategic Air Forces, 15 July 1945-February 1946
86th Combat Mapping Squadron, Seventh Air Force (air echelon), October–November 1944
86th Combat Mapping Squadron, AAF, Pacific Ocean Areas, 24 November 1944 – 14 July 1945
372d Bombardment Squadron (Heavy), 307th Bombardment Group (Heavy), 2 November 1942 – 12 June 1942 (operated from Midway, 22–24 December 1942; and Funafuti, 18–23 April 1943)

- Kipapa Field, Oahu, Hawaiian Islands

21°20′46″N 158°01′01″W
Seventh Air Force
6th Fighter Squadron, 18th Fighter Group, 17 November 1942 – 15 March 1943 (detachment operating from Guadalcanal 28 February-8 January 1943)
6th Night Fighter Squadron, 15th Fighter Group, 16 March 1943 – 2 March 1944 (detachment operated from Guadalcanal 16 March-15 September 1943 and another from New Guinea 18 April-14 September 1943)
6th Night Fighter Squadron, VII Fighter Command, 28 October 1944 – 10 January 1945 (detachment operated from Kipapa 11 January-12 May 1945)
19th Fighter Squadron, 318th Fighter Group, 30 May-3 September 1943
28th Photographic Reconnaissance Squadron, Seventh Air Force, 16 January-8 October 1944 (detachments at Kwajalein, 30 January-24 September 1944; and Saipan, 11 July-8 October 1944)
31st Bombardment Squadron (Heavy), 5th Bombardment Group (Heavy), 23 May-8 September 1942
370th Bombardment Squadron (Heavy, 307th Bombardment Group (Heavy), 2 November 1942 – 17 March 1943 (operated from Midway, 22–24 December 1942 and Espiritu Santo, 6 February-17 March 1943)
392d Bombardment Squadron (Heavy), 30th Bombardment Group (Heavy), 18 March-22 May 1945
548th Night Fighter Squadron, VII Fighter Command, 16 October 1944 – 27 February 1945
549th Night Fighter Squadron, VII Fighter Command, 20 October 1944 – 19 February 1945

- Kualoa Field, Oahu, Hawaiian Islands

21°31′35″N 157°50′22″W
Seventh Air Force
19th Fighter Squadron, 18th Fighter Group, 22 May-19 October 1942
19th Fighter Squadron, 318th Fighter Group, 26 December 1943 – 17 April 1944
28th Photographic Reconnaissance Squadron, Seventh Air Force 9 October-12 December 1944 and VI Air Service Area Command, 13 December 1944 – 7 May 1945, 9 October 1944 – 7 May 1945 (detachments at Saipan, 9 October 1944-May 1945; and Okinawa, 23 April-8 May 1945)
31st Bombardment Squadron (Heavy), 5th Bombardment Group (Heavy), 9 September-9 November 1942
41st Photographic Reconnaissance Squadron, 7th Fighter Wing, 18 April-31 May 1945
42d Bombardment Squadron (Heavy), 11th Bombardment Group (Heavy), 5 June-7 July 1942 and 8 April-8 November 1943
531st Fighter Squadron, Seventh Air Force, 21 April-14 June 1944
531st Fighter Squadron, 21st Fighter Group, 15 June 1944 – 7 October 1944

- Mokulkeia Field, Oahu, Hawaiian Islands

21°34′46″N 158°11′50″W
Seventh Air Force
508th Fighter Group, 25 February-15 September 1945

466th Fighter Squadron, 25 February-15 September 1945
467th Fighter Squadron, 3 March-15 September 1945
468th Fighter Squadron, 3 March-20 September 1945

23d Bombardment Squadron (Heavy), 5th Bombardment Group (Heavy), 24 March-3 November 1942
27th Bombardment Squadron (Heavy), 30th Bombardment Group (Heavy), 20 October-9 November 1943
42d Bombardment Squadron (Heavy), 11th Bombardment Group (Heavy), 8–21 July 1942, 9 January-18 March 1944 and 23 June-21 September 1944
45th Pursuit Squadron, 15th Pursuit Group, 27 December 1941 – 14 May 1942
45th Fighter Squadron, 15th Fighter Group, 15 May-19 October 1942 and 6 April-18 June 1944
46th Fighter Squadron, 15th Fighter Group, 22 May-15 December 1942
46th Fighter Squadron, 21st Fighter Group, 13 October 1944 – 25 March 1945
47th Fighter Squadron, 15th Fighter Group, 8 November 1943 – 7 June 1944
72d Fighter Squadron, 21st Fighter Group, 8 June 1944 – 25 March 1945
73d Fighter Squadron, 318th Fighter Group, 5 May-7 November 1943 and 1 April-7 June 1944
424th Bombardment Squadron (Heavy), 307th Bombardment Group (Heavy), 2 November 1942 – 17 March 1942 (operated from Midway, 22–24 December 1942; Funafuti, 20 January-1 February 1943; and Funafuti, 20 January-1 February 1943)
531st Fighter Squadron, 21st Fighter Group, 8 October 1944 – 25 March 1945

- Naval Air Station Barbers Point, Oahu, Hawaiian Islands

21°18′27″N 158°04′13″W
19th Fighter Squadron, 18th Fighter Group 9 February-15 March 1943
19th Fighter Squadron, 318th Fighter Group 16 March-19 May 1943

- Naval Air Station Kaneohe Bay, Oahu, Hawaiian Islands

21°26′56″N 157°46′12″W
44th Pursuit Squadron, 18th Pursuit Group, 27 December 1941 – 24 January 1942
73d Fighter Squadron, 318th Fighter Group, 26 January-4 May 1943
78th Pursuit Squadron (Interceptor), 18th Pursuit Group (Interceptor), 9 December 1941 – 14 May 1942
78th Fighter Squadron, 18th Fighter Group, 15 May 1942 – 22 January 1943

- Schofield Barracks, Oahu, Hawaiian Islands

21°29′36″N 158°03′51″W
Seventh Air Force
163d Liaison Squadron, AAF, Pacific Ocean Areas, 20 January-6 April 1945

- Stanley Field, Oahu, Hawaiian Islands

21°29′24″N 158°04′36″W
Seventh Air Force
19th Fighter Squadron, 318th Fighter Group, 4 September-25 December 1943
45th Fighter Squadron, 15th Fighter Group, 20 December 1942 – 13 August 1943
78th Fighter Squadron, 15th Fighter Group, 6 January-31 March 1944

- Waiele Gulch Field, Oahu, Hawaiian Islands

21°26′N 158°03′W

- Wheeler Field, Oahu, Hawaiian Islands

21°29′05″N 158°02′23″W
Seventh Air Force
Headquarters, 14th Pursuit Wing, 1 November 1940 – 23 January 1942
15th Pursuit Group (Fighter), 1 December 1940 – 14 May 1942

45th Pursuit Squadron (Fighter), 1 December 1940 – 20 December 1941
46th Pursuit Squadron (Fighter), 1 December 1940 – 5 February 1942
72d Pursuit Squadron (Fighter), 5 October 1941 – 14 May 1942

15th Fighter Group, 15 May 1942 – 2 June 1944

46th Fighter Squadron, 17 February-14 June 1944
72d Fighter Squadron, 15 May 1942-24 July 1943 and 21 October-17 December 1943

18th Pursuit Group (Interceptor), 21 January 1927 – 14 May 1942

6th Pursuit Squadron (Interceptor), 11 January 1927 – 14 May 1942
19th Pursuit Squadron (Interceptor_, 11 January 1927 – 19 February 1942
44th Pursuit Squadron (Interceptor), 12–26 December 1941 and 25 January-14 May 1945
47th Pursuit Squadron (Interceptor), 1 December 1940 – 21 February 1942
73d Pursuit Squadron (Interceptor), 5 October 1941 – 14 May 1942
78th Pursuit Squadron (Interceptor), 1 February 1940 – 8 December 1941

18th Fighter Group, 15 May 1942 – 10 March 1943

6th Fighter Squadron, 15 May-29 August 1942
44th Fighter Squadron, 15 May-22 June 1942
73d Fighter Squadron, 15–21 May 1942

21st Fighter Group, 21 April-12 October 1944

46th Fighter Squadron, 15th Fighter Group, 15 June-12 October 1944

30th Bombardment Group (Heavy), March-28 September 1945

27th Bombardment Squadron (Heavy), 23 May-24 September 1945
38th Bombardment Squadron (Heavy), 17 March-20 September 1945
392d Bombardment Squadron (Heavy), 23 May-28 September 1945
819th Bombardment Squadron (Heavy), 14 October 1944 – 4 January 1946

41st Bombardment Group (Medium), 14 October 1944 – 6 June 1945

47th Bombardment Squadron (Medium), 5 November 1944 – 6 June 1945
48th Bombardment Squadron (Medium), 14 October 1944 – 20 May 1945
396th Bombardment Squadron (Medium), 14 October 1944 – 6 June 1945
820th Bombardment Squadron (Medium), 14 October 1944 – 20 May 1945

26th Bombardment Squadron (Heavy), 11th Bombardment Group (Heavy), 20 December 1941-19 July 1942 and 11 May-10 November 1943
58th Bombardment Squadron (Light), Hawaiian Air Force, 1 June-17 March 1941 and 19 December 1941 – 2 February 1942
58th Bombardment Squadron (Light), 7th Air Force, 3 February-17 September 1942
58th Bombardment Squadron (Dive), Seventh Air Force, 18 September 1942 – 18 June 1943
86th Observation Squadron, Hawaiian Air Force, 1 February-14 March 1941
86th Observation Squadron, 7th Air Force, 17 August-3 September 1942
86th Observation Squadron, Seventh Air Force, 8 September 1942 – 30 May 1943
86th Reconnaissance Squadron (Bomber), Seventh Air Force, 31 May-12 November 1943
86th Combat Mapping Squadron, Seventh Air Force, 13 November 1943 – 28 June 1944
86th Combat Mapping Squadron air echelon, Seventh Air Force, June–October 1944
371st Bombardment Squadron (Heavy), 307th Bombardment Group (Heavy), 2 November 1942 – 12 June 1943 (operated from Midway, 21–24 December 1942 and 6–12 February 1943; Canton, 6–12 February 1943 and Funafuti, 18–23 April 1943)

JOHNSTON ATOLL

- Naval Air Station Johnston Island, Johnston Island

16°43′50″N 169°32′07″W

LINE ISLANDS

- Casady Field, Christmas Island

01°59′10″N 157°20′59″W
Seventh Air Force
12th Pursuit Squadron (Interceptor), 50th Pursuit Group (Interceptor) attached to VII Interceptor Command, 10 February-14 May 1942
12th Fighter Squadron, 50th Fighter Group attached to VII Fighter Command, 15 May-17 August 1942
12th Fighter Squadron, 15th Fighter Group, 18 August-18 November 1942

MARIANA ISLANDS

GUAM ISLAND

- Agana Airfield, Guam, Marianas Islands

13°29′02″N 144°47′50″E
Seventh Air Force
11th Bombardment Group (Heavy), 25 October 1944 – 1 July 1945

26th Bombardment Squadron (Heavy), 21 October 1944 – 1 July 1945
42d Bombardment Squadron (Heavy), 22 September 1944 – 1 July 1945
98th Bombardment Squadron (Heavy), 21 October 1944 – 1 July 1945
431st Bombardment Squadron (Heavy), 21 October 1944 – 1 July 1945

21st Fighter Group, 17 April – 10 October 1946.

- Harmon Airfield, Guam, Marianas Islands

13°32′11.94″N 144°49′19.74″E
Twentieth Air Force
Headquarters, Twentieth Air Force, 16 July 1945 – 15 May 1949
Headquarters, XXI Bomber Command, 4 December 1944 – 16 July 1945
9th Bombardment Group, Very Heavy, 9 June 1947 – 20 October 1948

- North Field, Guam, Mariana Islands

13°34′52″N 144°55′28″E
Twentieth Air Force
Headquarters: 314th Bombardment Wing, Very Heavy, 16 January 1945 – 14 June 1946
19th Bombardment Group, Very Heavy, 16 January 1945 – 4 July 1950

28th Bombardment Squadron, Very Heavy, 16 January 1945 – 27 June 1950
30th Bombardment Squadron, Very Heavy, 16 January 1945 – 27 June 1950
93d Bombardment Squadron, Very Heavy, 16 January 1945 – 27 June 1950

29th Bombardment Group, Very Heavy, 17 January 1945 – 19 May 1946

6th Bombardment Squadron, Very Heavy, 17 January 1945 – 20 May 1946
43d Bombardment Squadron, Very Heavy, 17 January 1945 – 20 May 1946
52d Bombardment Squadron, Very Heavy, 17 January 1945 – 20 May 1946

39th Bombardment Group, Very Heavy, 18 February–17 November 1945

60th Bombardment Squadron, Very Heavy, 18 February-16 November 1945
61st Bombardment Squadron, Very Heavy, 18 February-16 November 1945
62d Bombardment Squadron, Very Heavy, 18 February-16 November 1945

330th Bombardment Group, Very Heavy, 18 February–15 November 1945

457th Bombardment Squadron, Very Heavy, 18 February-21 November 1945
458th Bombardment Squadron, Very Heavy, 18 February-21 November 1945
458th Bombardment Squadron, Very Heavy, 18 February-19 November 1945

- Northwest Field, Guam, Mariana Islands

13°37′15.09″N 144°51′24.93″E
Eighth Air Force
382d Bombardment Group, Very Heavy, 8 September–16 December 1945

Note: Only ground echelons of the 420th, 464th and 872d Bombardment Squadrons, Very Heavy, arrived. The air echelons remained in the U.S. until inactivated.

Twentieth Air Force
Headquarters: 315th Bombardment Wing, Very Heavy, 5 April 1945 – 29 May 1946
16th Bombardment Group, Very Heavy, 14 April 1945 – 15 April 1946

15th Bombardment Squadron, Very Heavy, 14 April 1945 – 15 April 1946
16th Bombardment Squadron, Very Heavy, 14 April 1945 – 15 April 1946
17th Bombardment Squadron, Very Heavy, 14 April 1945 – 15 April 1946

331st Bombardment Group, Very Heavy, 12 May 1945 – 15 April 1946

355th Bombardment Squadron, Very Heavy, 12 May 1945 – 15 April 1946
356th Bombardment Squadron, Very Heavy, 12 May 1945 – 15 April 1946
357th Bombardment Squadron, Very Heavy, 12 May 1945 – 15 April 1946

501st Bombardment Group, Very Heavy, 14 May 1945 – 10 June 1946

21st Bombardment Squadron, Very Heavy, 14 May 1945 – 10 June 1946
41st Bombardment Squadron, Very Heavy, 14 May 1945 – 10 June 1946
485th Bombardment Squadron, Very Heavy, 14 May 1945 – 10 June 1946

502d Bombardment Group, Very Heavy, 12 May 1945 – 15 April 1946

402d Bombardment Squadron, Very Heavy, 12 May 1945 – 15 April 1946
411th Bombardment Squadron, Very Heavy, 12 May 1945 – 15 April 1946
430th Bombardment Squadron, Very Heavy, 12 May 1945 – 15 April 1946

41st Photographic Reconnaissance Squadron, AAF Pacific Ocean Areas, 13 June–15 July 1945
41st Photographic Reconnaissance Squadron, U.S. Army Forces, Middle Pacific (attached to Twentieth Air Force), 16 July-18 September 1945

- Orote Field, Guam, Mariana Islands

13°26′13″N 144°38′23″E

SAIPAN ISLAND

- East Field, Saipan, Mariana Islands

15°10′04.89″N 145°46′36.21″E
Seventh Air Force
Headquarters, Seventh Air Force, Army Air Forces, Pacific Ocean Areas, 13 December 1944 – 13 July 1945
Headquarters, VII Bomber Command, August–July 1944
21st Fighter Group, 4 December 1945 – 17 April 1946
30th Bombardment Group (Heavy), 4 August 1944 – February 1945
318th Fighter Group, June 1944 – 30 April 1945
6th Night Fighter Squadron detachment, VII Fighter Command, 21 July 1944 – 1 May 1945
9th Troop Carrier Squadron, Seventh Air Force, 4 August 1944 – July 1946
28th Photographic Reconnaissance Squadron. Seventh Air Force, 11 July 1944 – May 1945
86th Combat Mapping Squadron ground echelon, Seventh Air Force, 8 July-23 October 1944
86th Combat Mapping Squadron ground echelon, AAF, Pacific Ocean Areas, 24 October-6 November 1944
548th Night Fighter Squadron detachment, VII Fighter Command, 17 February - 6 March 1945
549th Night Fighter Squadron air echelon, VII Fighter Command, 20 February – 20 March 1945

- Isley Field, Saipan, Mariana Islands

15°07′08″N 145°43′46″E
Twentieth Air Force
Headquarters, 73d Bombardment Wing, Very Heavy, 24 August 1944-19-October 1945
497th Bombardment Group, Very Heavy, 17 September 1944 – 1 November 1945

869th Bombardment Squadron, Very Heavy, 17 September 1944 – 1 November 1945
870th Bombardment Squadron, Very Heavy, 17 September 1944 – 1 November 1945
871st Bombardment Squadron, Very Heavy, 17 September 1944 – 1 November 1945

498th Bombardment Group, Very Heavy, 6 September 1944 – 2 November 1945

873d Bombardment Squadron, Very Heavy, 7 September 1944 – 2 November 1945
874th Bombardment Squadron, Very Heavy, 7 September 1944 – 1 November 1945
875th Bombardment Squadron, Very Heavy, 7 September 1944 – 2 November 1945

499th Bombardment Group, Very Heavy, 18 September 1944 – 9 November 1945

877th Bombardment Squadron, Very Heavy, 22 September 1944-November 1945
878th Bombardment Squadron, Very Heavy, 22 September 1944-November 1945
879th Bombardment Squadron, Very Heavy, 22 September 1944-November 1945

500th Bombardment Group, Very Heavy, 18 September 1944 – 21 October 1945

881st Bombardment Squadron, Very Heavy, 19 September 1944 – 15 November 1945
882d Bombardment Squadron, Very Heavy, 19 September 1944 – 15 November 1945
883d Bombardment Squadron, Very Heavy, 19 September 1944 – 15 November 1945

- Kobler Field, Saipan, Mariana Islands

15°07′26″N 145°42′25″E

819th Bombardment Squadron

TINIAN ISLAND

- North Field, Tinian, Mariana Islands

15°04′19.36″N 145°38′18.13″E
Twentieth Air Force
Headquarters, 313th Bombardment Wing, Very Heavy, 24 December 1944 – 14 March 1946
6th Bombardment Group, Very Heavy, 28 December 1944 – 27 January 1946

24th Bombardment Squadron, Very Heavy, 28 December 1945 – 12 March 1946
39th Bombardment Squadron, Very Heavy, 28 December 1945 – 12 March 1946
40th Bombardment Squadron, Very Heavy, 28 December 1945 – 12 March 1946

9th Bombardment Group, Very Heavy, 28 December 1944 – 14 April 1946

1st Bombardment Squadron, Very Heavy, 28 December 1944 – 7 March 1946
5th Bombardment Squadron, Very Heavy, 28 December 1944 – 6 March 1946
99th Bombardment Squadron, Very Heavy, 28 December 1944 – 7 March 1946

504th Bombardment Group, Very Heavy, 23 December 1944 – 5 March 1946

398th Bombardment Squadron, Very Heavy, 23 December 1944 – 12 March 1946
421st Bombardment Squadron, Very Heavy, 23 December 1944 – 12 March 1946
680th Bombardment Squadron, Very Heavy, Second Air Force attached to 504th Bombardment Group, 15 June 1945 – 12 March 1946

505th Bombardment Group, Very Heavy, 19 December 1944 – 5 March 1946

482d Bombardment Squadron, Very Heavy, 24 December 1944 – 5 March 1946
483d Bombardment Squadron, Very Heavy, 24 December 1944 – 5 March 1946
484th Bombardment Squadron, Very Heavy, 24 December 1944 – 5 March 1946

509th Composite Group, 29 May–17 October 1945

320th Troop Carrier Squadron, 30 May-17 October 1945
393d Bombardment Squadron, Very Heavy, 30 May-17 October 1945

- West Field, Tinian, Mariana Islands

14°59′57″N 145°37′10″E
Twentieth Air Force
Headquarters, 58th Bombardment Wing, (Very Heavy), 29 March–15 November 1945
40th Bombardment Group, Very Heavy, 4 April–7 November 1945

25th Bombardment Squadron, Very Heavy, April-7 November 1945
44th Bombardment Squadron, Very Heavy, April-7 November 1945
45th Bombardment Squadron, Very Heavy, April-7 November 1945

444th Bombardment Group, Very Heavy, 7 April–18 September 1945

676th Bombardment Squadron, Very Heavy, April-27 October 1945
677th Bombardment Squadron, Very Heavy, April-27 October 1945
678th Bombardment Squadron, Very Heavy, April-27 October 1945

462d Bombardment Wing, Very Heavy, 4 April–5 November 1945

768th Bombardment Squadron, Very Heavy, April-15 November 1945
769th Bombardment Squadron, Very Heavy, April-15 November 1945
770th Bombardment Squadron, Very Heavy, April-15 November 1945

468th Bombardment Group, Very Heavy, 6 April–15 November 1945

792d Bombardment Squadron, Very Heavy, 7 May-15 November 1945
793d Bombardment Squadron, Very Heavy, 7 May-15 November 1945
794th Bombardment Squadron, Very Heavy, 7 May-15 November 1945

MARSHALL ISLANDS

- Eniwetok Airfield (Stickell Field), Eniwetok Atoll, Marshall Islands

11°20′28″N 162°19′39″E
Seventh Air Force
86th Combat Mapping Squadron detachment, Seventh Air Force, June–August 1944

- Kwajalein Airfield, Kwajalein, Marshall Islands

08°43′12″N 167°43′54″E
Seventh Air Force
Headquarters, VII Bomber Command, March–August 1944
11th Bombardment Group (Heavy), 5 April-24 October 1944

26th Bombardment Squadron (Heavy), 14 April-20 October 1944
98th Bombardment Squadron (Heavy), 3 April-20 October 1944
431st Bombardment Squadron (Heavy), 31 March-20 October 1944

30th Bombardment Group (Heavy), 20 March – 4 August 1944
28th Photographic Reconnaissance Squadron detachments, Seventh Air Force, 30 June – 24 September 1944
86th Combat Mapping Squadron detachment, Seventh Air Force, May–June 1944

MIDWAY ISLANDS

- Henderson Field, Midway Atoll, Hawaiian Islands

28°12′39.78″N 177°19′43.00″W
Seventh Air Force
18th Reconnaissance Squadron, 22nd Bombardment Group*, 3 June–6, 1942
31st Bombardment Squadron (Heavy), 5th Bombardment Group (Heavy)*, 3–6 June 1942
42d Bombardment Squadron, (Heavy) 11th Bombardment Group (Heavy)*, 3–6 June 1942
69th Bombardment Squadron (Medium), 38th Bombardment Group (Medium)* 3–6 June 1942
72d Bombardment Squadron (Heavy), 5th Bombardment Group (Heavy)*, 3–6 June 1942
73d Fighter Squadron, 18th Fighter Group, 17 June 1942 – 26 January 1943
78th Fighter Squadron, 18th Fighter Group 23 January-15 March 1943
78th Fighter Squadron, 15th Fighter Group 16 March-22 April 1943
431st Bombardment Squadron (Heavy), 11th Bombardment Group (Heavy)*, 29 May – 6 June 1942

.* Detachments deployed for use in Battle of Midway

PHOENIX ISLANDS

- Topham Field, Canton Island

02°46′09″S 171°42′19″W
Seventh Air Force
26th Bombardment Squadron (Heavy), 11th Bombardment Group (Heavy), (air echelon operated from Canton Island 12 November-31 December 1943)
46th Fighter Squadron, 15th Fighter Group, 27 March-17 December 1943
58th Bombardment Squadron (Dive), Seventh Air Force, 24 June-13 August 1943
333d Fighter Squadron, 18th Fighter Group, 11 September 1942 – 10 January 1943
333d Fighter Squadron, 318th Fighter Group, 11 January-5 April 1943
392d Bombardment Squadron, Heavy, 30th Bombardment Group, Heavy 10 January-16 March 1944
531st Fighter-Bomber Squadron, Seventh Air Force, 14 August-17 December 1943

RYUKYU ISLANDS

- Hamasaki, Okinawa Island, Ryukyu Islands

Fifth Air Force
Headquarters Fifth Air Force, 4 August-24 September 1945
Headquarters V Bomber Command, August–October 1945
Headquarters V Fighter Command, August–October 1945
308th Bombardment Wing (Heavy), 16 June-27 September 1945

- Ie Shima Airstrip, Ie Shima Island, Ryukyu Islands

24°43′44″N 127°45′42″E
Fifth Air Force
3d Air Commando Group, August-26 October 1945

3d Fighter Squadron (Commando), 9 August-26 October 1945
4th Fighter Squadron (Commando), 9 August-26 October 1945
160th Liaison Squadron (Commando), 15 August-21 September 1945 (attached to 5th Air Liaison Group (Provisional)
318th Troop Carrier Squadron (Commando), 25 August-17 October 1945

8th Fighter Group, 6 August-21 November 1945

35th Fighter Squadron, 9 August-20 November 1945
36th Fighter Squadron, 6 August-23 November 1945
80th Fighter Squadron, 5 August-24 November 1945

43d Bombardment Group, Heavy, 26 July-9 December 1945

63d Bombardment Squadron, Heavy, 25 July-9 December 1945
64th Bombardment Squadron, Heavy, 26 July-9 December 1945
65th Bombardment Squadron, Heavy, 24 July-9 December 1945
403d Bombardment Squadron, Heavy, 22 July-9 December 1945

71st Reconnaissance Group, August-5 October 1945

17th Reconnaissance Squadron(Bombardment), 29 July-25 October 1945 (detachment at Lingayen, Luzon, Philippine Islands to September 1945)
82d Tactical Reconnaissance Squadron, 28 July-6 October 1945
110th Tactical Reconnaissance Squadron, 28 July-5 October 1945

90th Bombardment Group, Heavy, 10 August–December 1945

319th Bombardment Squadron, Heavy, 12 August-22 November 1945
320th Bombardment Squadron, Heavy, 10 August-22 November 1945
321st Bombardment Squadron, Heavy, 15 August-22 November 1945
400th Bombardment Squadron, Heavy, 11 August-22 November 1945

345th Bombardment Group, Medium, 25 July-10 December 1945

498th Bombardment Squadron, Medium, 20 July-1 December 1945
499th Bombardment Squadron, Medium, 28 July-1 December 1945
500th Bombardment Squadron, Medium, 27 July-1 December 1945
501st Bombardment Squadron, Medium, 28 July-11 December 1945

348th Fighter Group, 9 July–October 1945

340th Fighter Squadron, 9 July-8 September 1945
341st Fighter Squadron, 12 July-8 September 1945
342d Fighter Squadron, 12 July-19 October 1945
460th Fighter Squadron, 12 July-23 November 1945

475th Fighter Group, 8 August-22 September 1945

431st Fighter Squadron, 8 August-4 October 1945
432d Fighter Squadron, 8 August-27 September 1945
433d Fighter Squadron, 8 August-27 September 1945

421st Night Fighter Squadron, V Fighter Command, 24 July-24 November 1945
547th Night Fighter Squadron, V Fighter Command, 13 August -6 October 1945
Seventh Air Force
318th Fighter Group, 30 April-30 July 1945

19th Fighter Squadron, 30 April-30 July 1945
73d Fighter Squadron, 30 April-30 July 1945
333d Fighter Squadron, 30 April-30 July 1945

Eighth Air Force
301st Fighter Wing, 15 August-28 November 1945
318th Fighter Group, 15 August–November 1945

19th Fighter Squadron, 15 August–November 1945
73d Fighter Squadron, 15 August–November 1945
333d Fighter Squadron, 15 August–November 1945

413th Fighter Group, 15 August 1945 – 9 November 1945

1st Fighter Squadron, 15 August-16 November 1945
21st Fighter Squadron, 15 August-20 November 1945
34th Fighter Squadron, 15 August-16 November 1945

507th Fighter Group, 15 August 1945 – 28 January 1946

463d Fighter Squadron, 15 August 1945 – 28 January 1946
464th Fighter Squadron, 15 August 1945 – 28 January 1946
465th Fighter Squadron, 15 August 1945 – 28 January 1946

Twentieth Air Force
301st Fighter Wing, 19 May-14 August 1945 (attached to Army Air Forces, Pacific Ocean Area, 21 May 1945 and Seventh Air Force, 1 June-14 August 1945)
318th Fighter Group, 31 July 1945 – 14 August 1945

19th Fighter Squadron, 31 July 1945 – 14 August 1945
73d Fighter Squadron, 31 July 1945 – 14 August 1945
333d Fighter Squadron, 31 July 1945 – 14 August 1945

413th Fighter Group, 19 May-14 August 1945

1st Fighter Squadron, 19 May-14 August 1945
21st Fighter Squadron, 19 May-14 August 1945
34th Fighter Squadron, 19 May-14 August 1945

507th Fighter Group, 24 June-14 August 1945

463d Fighter Squadron, 24 June-14 August 1945
464th Fighter Squadron, 24 June-14 August 1945
465th Fighter Squadron, 24 June-14 August 1945

28th Photographic Reconnaissance Squadron, Seventh Air Force, (detachment operated from Ie Shima 14 May-21 June 1945)

- Kadena Field, Okinawa Island, Ryukyu Islands

26°21′20″N 127°46′03″E
Fifth Air Force
49th Fighter Group, 16 August-14 September 1945

7th Fighter Squadron, 17 August-14 September 1945
8th Fighter Squadron, 17 August-14 September 1945
9th Fighter Squadron, 16 August-14 September 1945

348th Fighter Group, 9 July–October 1945

340th Fighter Squadron, 9 July-8 September 1945
341st Fighter Squadron, 12 July-8 September 1945
342d Fighter Squadron, 12 July-19 October 1945

Headquarters, Eighth Air Force, U.S. Army Strategic Air Forces, 16 Jul 1945 – 7 June 1946

- Motobu Airfield, Okinawa Island, Ryukyu Islands

26°41′09″N 127°53′24″E
Fifth Air Force
58th Fighter Group, 10 July-25 October 1945

69th Fighter Squadron, 8 July-25 October 1945
310th Fighter Squadron, 9 July-25 October 1945
311th Fighter Squadron, 8 July-25 October 1945

- Yontan Field, Okinawa Island, Ryukyu Islands

26°21′26″N 127°45′59″E
Fifth Air Force
35th Fighter Group, 28 June–October 1945

39th Fighter Squadron, 30 June-10 October 1945
40th Fighter Squadron, 30 June-9 October 1945
41st Fighter Squadron, 30 June-9 October 1945

Seventh Air Force
Headquarters, Seventh Air Force, Far East Air Forces, 14 July-31 December 1945
Headquarters, VII Bomber Command, Jul 1945-March 1946

VOLCANO ISLANDS

- North Field, Iwo Jima, Volcano Islands

24°48′N 141°20′E
Known as Motoyama Number 3 by the Japanese. Construction began on North Field and it was designed to have a single runway 5,200-feet (1,280-meters) long for fighter aircraft. This field did not become operational before the end of the war.

- Central Field, Iwo Jima, Volcano Islands

24°47′05″N 141°19′27″E
Known as Motoyama Number 2 by the Japanese. This field was to be developed for staging B-29 Superfortresses en route from the Mariana Islands to Japan and had two B-29 Superfortress runways, a 5,200-foot (1,585-meter) fighter runways and a combat service center. The first B-29 runway was 9,800-feet (2,987-meters) long and was completed by 12 July; the second B-29 runway had been graded to 9,400-feet (2,865-meters) by V-J Day but was never surfaced. The old Japanese east-west runway became a 6,000-foot (1,829-meter) fueling strip.
Headquarters, VII Fighter Command, March-30 November 1945
21st Fighter Group, 21 March–15 July 1945

46th Fighter Squadron, 26 March-15 July 1945
72d Fighter Squadron, 26 March-15 July 1945
531st Fighter Squadron, 26 March-15 July 1945

41st Photographic Reconnaissance Squadron detachment. U.S. Army Forces, Middle Pacific, 9 August – c. 15 September 1945
548th Night Fighter Squadron, AAF Pacific Ocean Area, 5 March – 8 June 1945
549th Night Fighter Squadron, VII Fighter Command, 14 March 1945 – 5 February 1946

- South Field, Iwo Jima, Volcano Islands (Japan)

24°45′46.23″N 141°18′13.29″E
Known as Motoyama Number 1 by the Japanese, the Japanese had built two runways, 5,025-feet (1,532-meters) and 3,965-feet (1,209-meters) long respectively. The Americans rebuilt this field to accommodate fighters and medium and heavy bombers. It became operational for fighters on 6 March 1945. By July, both runways were paved to 6,000-feet (1,829-meters) and had 7,940-feet (2,420-meters) of taxiways and 258 hardstands.
15th Fighter Group, VII Fighter Command, 6 March-15 July 1945; U.S. Army Strategic Air Forces, 16 July-4 August 1945; and VII Fighter Command, 5 August–25 November 1945

45th Fighter Squadron, 4 March - 24 November 1945
47th Fighter Squadron, 27 February-4 December 1945
78th Fighter Squadron, 2 March-24 November 1945

21st Fighter Group, 16 July – Dec 1945

46th Fighter Squadron, 16 July – Dec 1945
72d Fighter Squadron, 16 July – Dec 1945
531st Fighter Squadron, 16 July – Dec 1945

1,

== See also ==
- United States Army Air Forces in the Pacific War (1941–1945)
  - USAAF in Australia
  - USAAF in the South Pacific
  - USAAF in the Southwest Pacific
