= 928th Expeditionary Air Refueling Squadron =

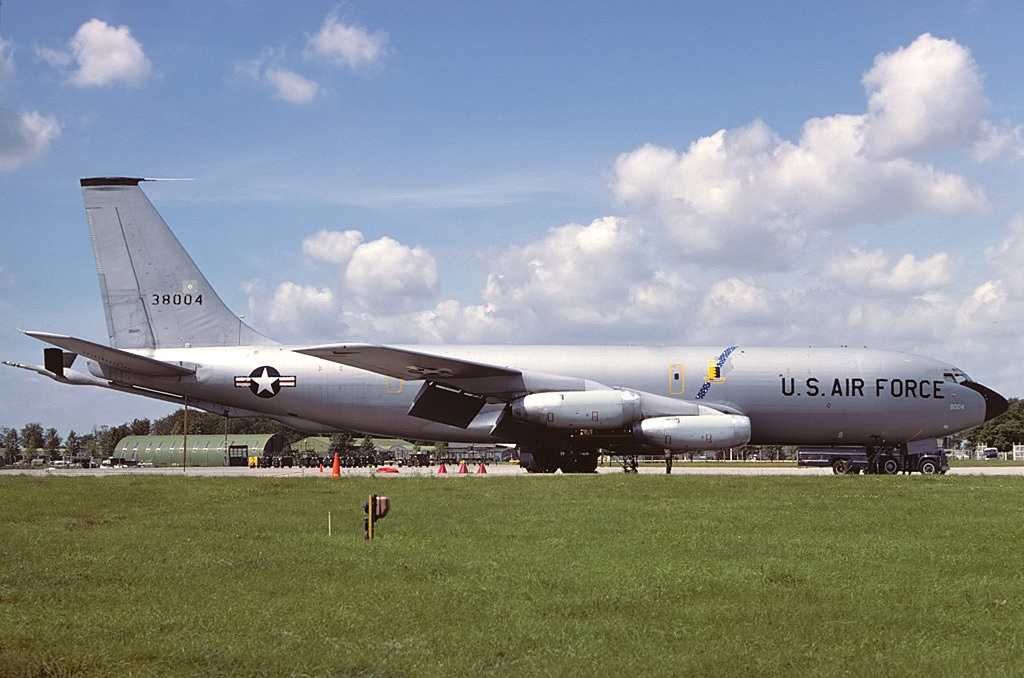
- KC-135A Stratotanker of the 28th Bombardment Wing
- Active: 1943–1946; 1959–1960
- Country: United States
- Branch: United States Air Force
- Role: Air refueling
- Engagements: Pacific Ocean theater of World War II

Insignia
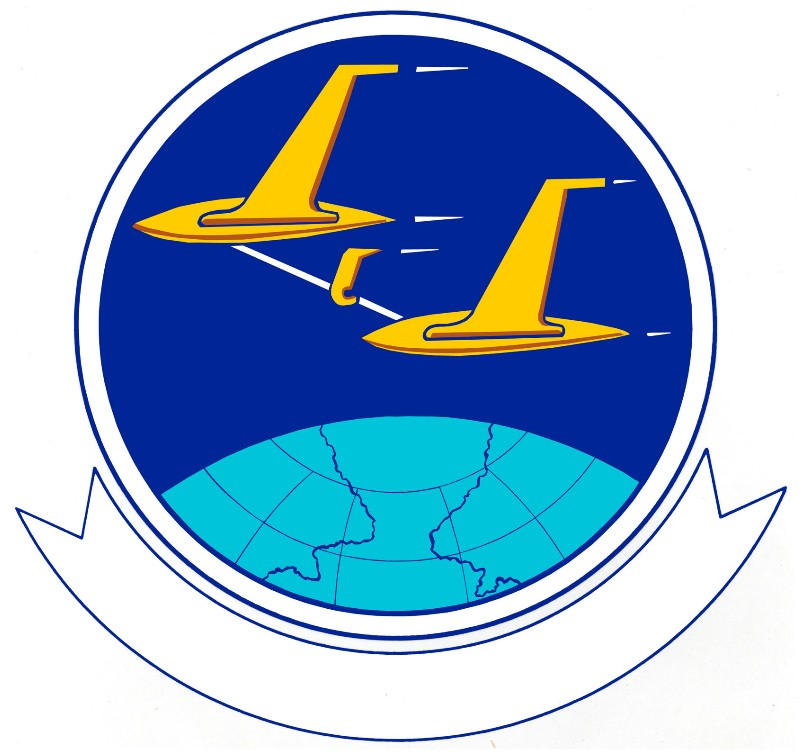
- 928th Air Refueling Squadron emblem (Note: Approved 31 July 1959.)

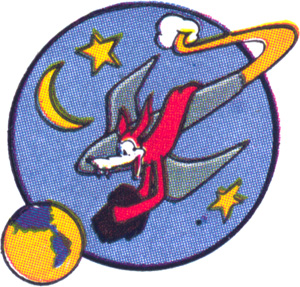
- 28 Photographic Reconnaissance Squadron emblem (Note: Approved 2 August 1944. Description: Over and through a light pastel blue disc, border black, a caricatured red wolf holding and focusing a black aerial camera, while riding a light gray winged comet, leaving curved yellow speed trail toward sinister chief, and diving toward small yellow sphere marked with blue land indications in sinister base, breaking through rim of disc, all between a yellow star and decrescent moon in dexter chief and a star of like color in sinister base.)

The 928th Expeditionary Air Refueling Squadron is a provisional unit of the United States Air Force. It is assigned to Air Mobility Command to activate or inactivate as needed for contingency operations.

The squadron was first active during World War II as the 28th Photographic Reconnaissance Squadron. After training in the United States the unit moved to the Pacific. Although squadron headquarters remained in Hawaii until the invasion of Okinawa, it deployed detachments to support combat operations in the Pacific. Its last wartime assignment was with the 316th Bombardment Wing at Yontan Airfield, Okinawa where it was inactivated on 29 May 1946.

The 928th Air Refueling Squadron was active from 1959 to 1960 at Ellsworth Air Force Base, South Dakota as the 28th Bombardment Wing converted to Boeing B-52 Stratofortress bombers. The squadrons were consolidated on 19 September 1985 and converted to provisional status as the 928th Expeditionary Air Refueling Squadron in 2003.

== History ==
=== World War II ===
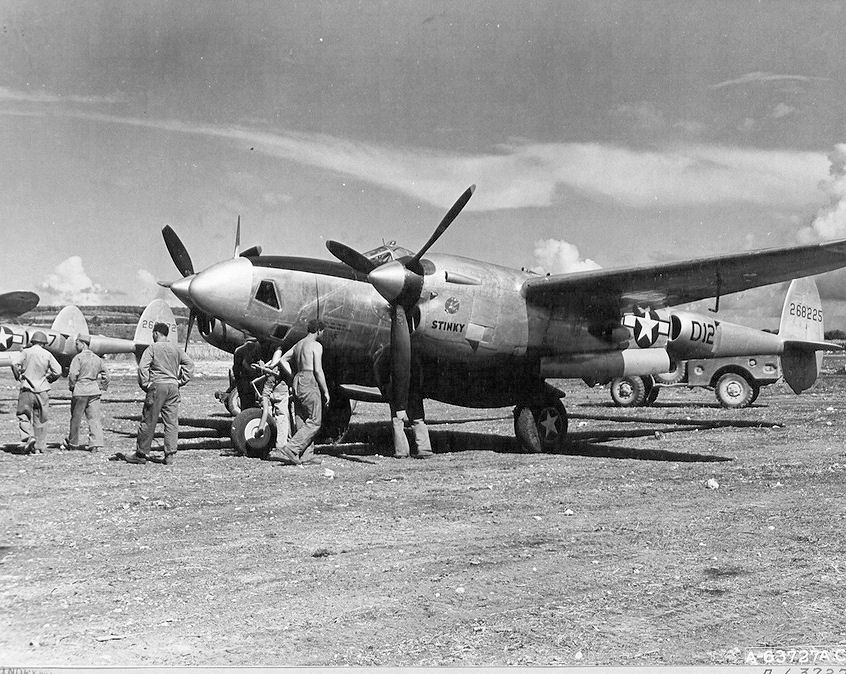
28th Squadron F-5B Lightning (Note: Aircraft is Lockheed F-5B-1-LO Lightning, serial 42-68225. Photo taken at East Field, Saipan, Mariana Islands, July 1944.)

The squadron was first activated at Peterson Field, Colorado in the spring of 1943 as one of the original four squadrons of the 7th Photographic Group. It was transferred to the Third Air Force Photographic Unit Training Center a month later in preparation for the 7th group's transfer on paper to the European Theater of Operations. Although the 28th was assigned other aircraft at times, its primary equipment was the Lockheed F-5 Lightning.

The squadron was attached to the 2d Photographic Reconnaissance and Mapping Group and moved with the group to Will Rogers Field in October 1943. The 2d group acted as an Operational Training Unit and as a Replacement Training Unit while the squadron was attached to it. It was an oversized unit that provided cadres to "satellite groups" and at the same time trained individual pilots and aircrews. The squadron continued to train with the F-5 until shipping overseas.

In January 1944 the unit arrived in the Central Pacific Area. Although squadron headquarters remained in Hawaii until Operation Iceberg, the invasion of Okinawa in May 1945, it deployed elements that saw combat in the Central and Western Pacific from late June 1944. After arriving in Okinawa the 28th continued in combat until the Japanese surrender in August 1945. It remained on Okinawa as part of the occupation forces until it was inactivated in 1946.

=== Post war operations ===
The 928th Air Refueling Squadron was activated at Ellsworth Air Force Base, South Dakota in 1959 as the refueling element of the 28th Bombardment Wing in 1959 as the wing converted from Convair B-36 Peacemakers to Boeing B-52 Stratofortresses. The conversion of the 28th wing to "Buffs" and move of two of its bombardment squadrons to other bases was part of SAC's program to disperse its Boeing B-52 Stratofortress bombers over a larger number of bases, thus making it more difficult for the Soviet Union to knock out the entire fleet with a surprise first strike. SAC bases with large concentrations of bombers made attractive targets. SAC's response was to break up its wings and scatter their aircraft over a larger number of bases.

In July 1960 the squadron deployed eight of its tankers to Grand Forks Air Force Base, South Dakota to test the ability of the 4133d Strategic Wing at Grand Forks to maintain an air refueling alert force. Two months after the return of these planes to Ellsworth, the squadron was inactivated and its mission, personnel, and equipment were transferred to the 28th Air Refueling Squadron.

In 1985 the 28th Photographic Reconnaissance Squadron and the 928th Air Refueling Squadron were consolidated into a single unit. In 2003 the consolidated squadron was converted to provisional status as the 928th Expeditionary Air Refueling Squadron.

== Lineage ==
28th Photographic Reconnaissance Squadron

- Constituted as: 28th Photographic Reconnaissance Squadron on 5 February 1943

Redesignated as: 28th Photographic Squadron (Light) on 6 February 1943
Activated on 1 May 1943
Redesignated as: 28th Photographic Reconnaissance Squadron on 11 August 1943
Inactivated on 29 May 1946

- Consolidated on 19 September 1985 with the 928th Air Refueling Squadron as the 928th Air Refueling Squadron

928th Air Refueling Squadron

- Constituted as the 928th Air Refueling Squadron, Heavy on 5 January 1959

Activated on 8 February 1959
Inactivated on 1 October 1960

- Consolidated on 19 September 1985 with the 28th Photographic Reconnaissance Squadron

Redesignated 928th Expeditionary Air Refueling Squadron and converted to provisional status on 20 March 2003

=== Assignments ===
- 7th Photographic Group (later 7th Photographic Reconnaissance and Mapping Group) 1 May 1943
- Third Air Force Photographic Unit Training Center, (attached to 2d Photographic Reconnaissance and Mapping Group) 21 June 1943
- III Reconnaissance Command, 15 August 1943
- 89th Reconnaissance Training Wing, 27 September 1943 (attached to 9th Photographic Reconnaissance Group after 16 November 1943)
- Seventh Air Force, c. 16 January 1944 (attached to VII Fighter Command 24 January 1944
- VI Air Service Area Command (remained attached to VII Fighter Command, 12 December 1944
- Seventh Air Force, 23 April 1945
- Eighth Air Force, 31 August 1945
- 316th Bombardment Wing, 15 May 1946 – 29 May 1946
- 28th Bombardment Wing, 8 February 1959 – 1 October 1960

=== Stations ===
- Peterson Field, Colorado, 1 May 1943
- Will Rogers Field, Oklahoma, 13 October 1943 – 1 January 1944
- Kipapa Airfield, Hawaii, 16 January 1944
- Kualoa Airfield, Hawaii, 9 October 1944 (detachments of the squadron operated from:

Kwajalein Airfield, Kwajalein, Marshall Islands, 30 June 1944 – 24 September 1944,
East Field (Saipan), Mariana Islands, 11 July 1944 – May 1945.
Peleliu Airfield, Peleliu, Palau Islands, 5 October 1944 – April 1945, and
Ie Shima Airfield, Okinawa, 23 April 1945 – 21 June 1945)

- Yontan Airfield, Okinawa, 8 May 1945 – 29 May 1946
- Ellsworth Air Force Base, South Dakota, 8 February 1959 – 1 October 1960

=== Aircraft ===
- Lockheed F-5 Lightning, 1943–1946
- Lockheed P-38 Lightning, 1943
- North American F-4 Mustang, 1943
- Douglas A-24 Skyraider, 1944
- Boeing KC-135A Stratotanker, 1959–1960

=== Campaigns ===
Campaign Streamer	Campaign	Dates	Notes
	American Theater without inscription	1 May 1943 – 1 January 1944	28th Photographic Squadron (later 28th Photographic Reconnaissance Squadron)
	Eastern Mandates	30 June 1944 – 14 April 1944	28th Photographic Reconnaissance Squadron
	Western Pacific	17 April 1944 – 2 September 1945	28th Photographic Reconnaissance Squadron
	Ryukus	26 March 1945 – 2 July 1945	28th Photographic Reconnaissance Squadron
	Air Offensive, Japan	30 June 1944 – 2 September 1945	28th Photographic Reconnaissance Squadron
	China Offensive	5 May 1945 – 2 September 1945	28th Photographic Reconnaissance Squadron

== See also ==
- List of P-38 Lightning operators
- List of United States Air Force air refueling squadrons
