= Delano Municipal Airport =

Delano Municipal Airport Delano Army Airfield
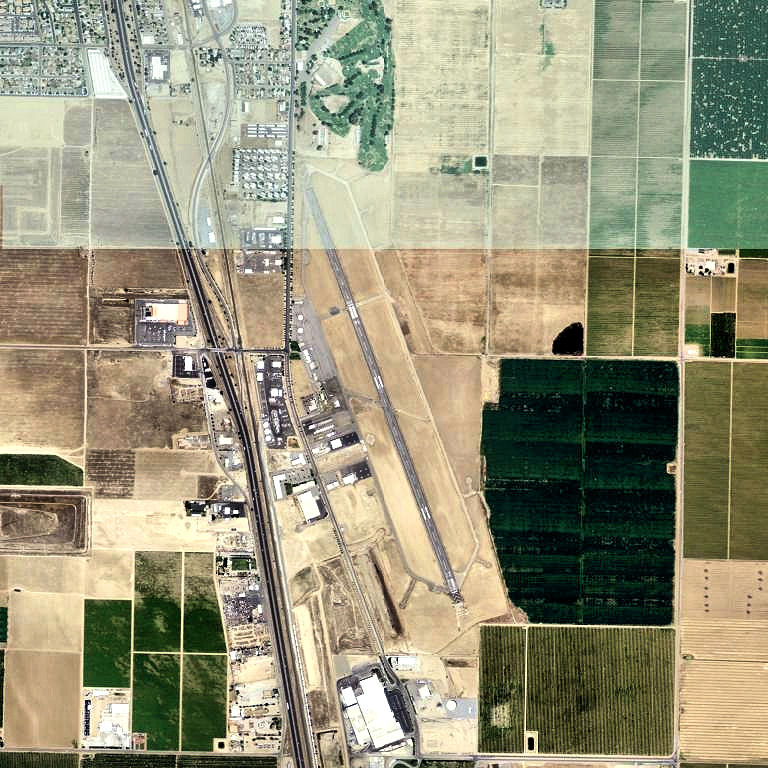
- USGS photo, 2006
- IATA: none; ICAO: KDLO; FAA LID: DLO

Summary
- Airport type: Public
- Owner: City of Delano
- Serves: Delano, California
- Elevation AMSL: 314 ft (96 m)
- Coordinates: 35°44′44″N 119°14′11″W

Map
- Location within California

Runways
Direction	Length		Surface
Direction	ft	m	Surface
14/32	5,651	1,724	Asphalt

Statistics (2006)
- Aircraft operations: 19,000
- Based aircraft: 44
- Source: Federal Aviation Administration

Delano Municipal Airport (ICAO: KDLO, FAA LID: DLO) is six miles southwest of Delano, in Kern County, California, United States.

Most U.S. airports use the same three-letter location identifier for the FAA and IATA, but Delano Municipal Airport is DLO to the FAA and has no IATA code.

== Facilities ==
Delano Municipal Airport covers 546 acres (221 ha) and has one asphalt runway (14/32) measuring 5,651 by 75 feet (1,722 by 23 m).

In the year ending January 23, 2006 the airport had 19,000 aircraft operations, average 52 per day, all general aviation. 44 aircraft are based at this airport: 68% single engine, 5% multi-engine and 27% helicopters.

== History ==
Delano Airport opened in April 1940. It was built by the federal government with monies appropriated by Congress for Development of Landing Areas for National Defense. It was built by the Civil Aeronautics Administration.

In late 1943 the United States Army Air Forces acquired usage rights to the airport. It was placed under the jurisdiction of the IV Fighter Command. The 481st Night Fighter Operational Training Group (NFOTG) used the facility, named Delano Army Airfield, as part of the Army Air Forces Night Fighter School which had transferred from Florida to Hammer Field, California. Delano was used as an auxiliary training airfield. The school operated a combination of modified Douglas A-20 Havocs for night fighter operations, designated P-70, and new prototype YP-61 Black Widow purpose-built night fighters.

Between 31 March and 15 June 1944, the 426th Night Fighter Squadron trained at Delano; the 548th Night Fighter Squadron between June and September 1944. In addition, flights of P-61s from the 427th, 547th, 549th and 550th Night Fighter Squadrons moved in and out of Delano AAF during 1944 as part of their training prior to being deployed to combat units, primarily in the Pacific and CBI theaters.

In December 1944, the 481st NFOTG was inactivated as part of an AAF reorganization. Delano Field was transferred over to the jurisdiction of Air Technical Service Command on 10 December. It was placed on standby status and the airport was only used for emergency, being under the control of Hammer Field.

With the end of the war, the base was declared excess to requirements and returned to civil control.

Delano has had almost no scheduled airline flights, but did appear in the OAG circa 1969.

== See also ==
- California World War II Army Airfields
- List of airports in Kern County, California
