= 316th Air Division =

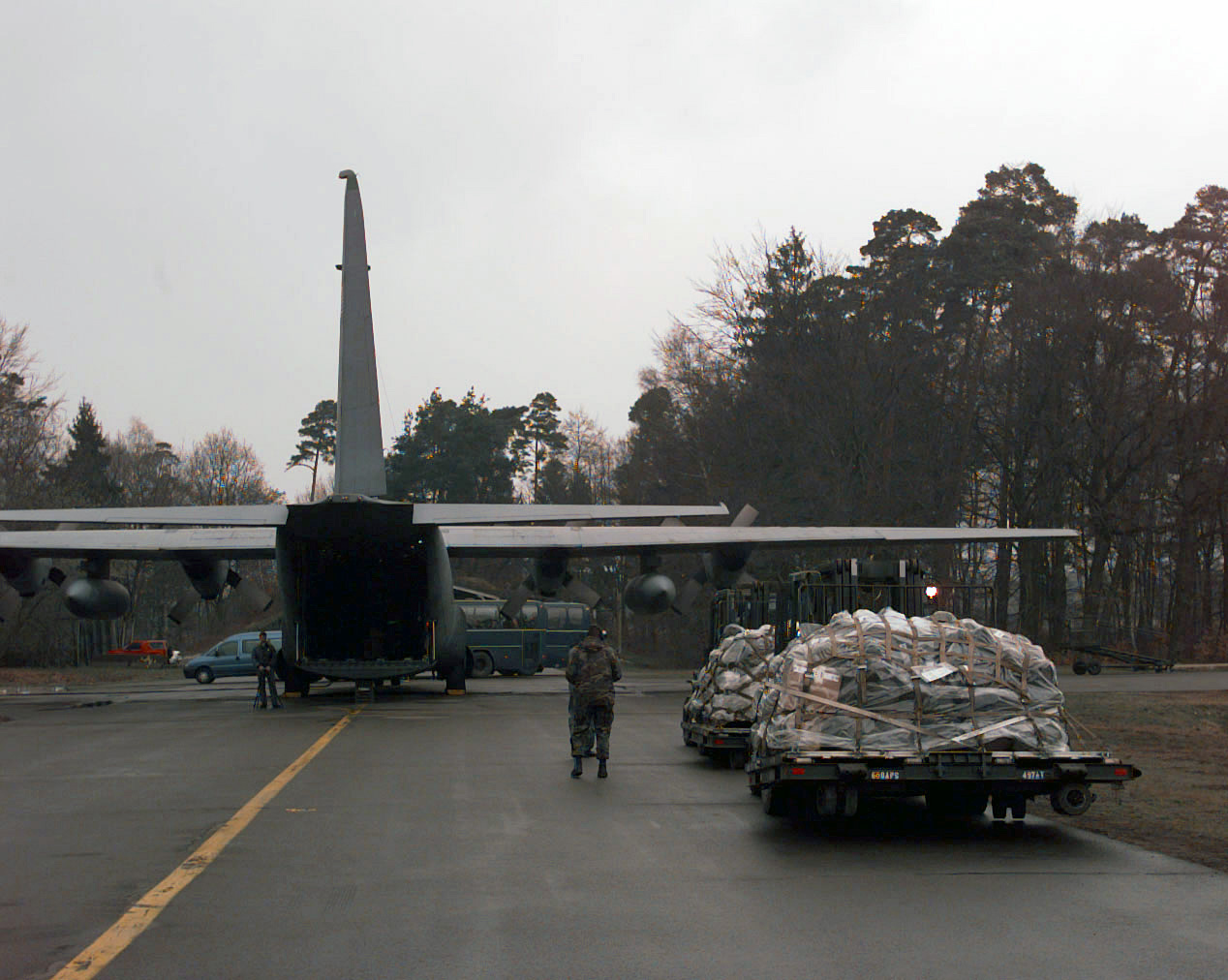
- Loading cargo onto a C-130 Hercules at Ramstein AB
- Active: 1944–1948; 1953–1960; 1985–1991
- Country: United States
- Branch: United States Air Force
- Role: Command of support elements
- Engagements: Pacific Theater
- Decorations: Air Force Outstanding Unit Award

Insignia
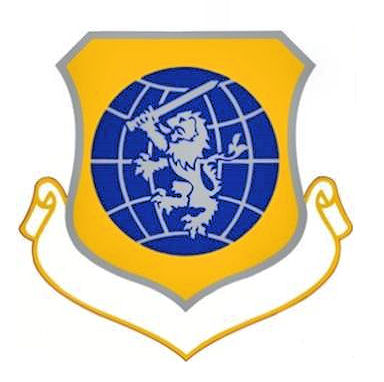
- 316th Air Division emblem (Note: Approved 15 November 1955. Description: Or, a globe azure gridlined gray and charged with a lion rampant grasping a sword of the third [color mentioned] all within a diminished bordure gray.)

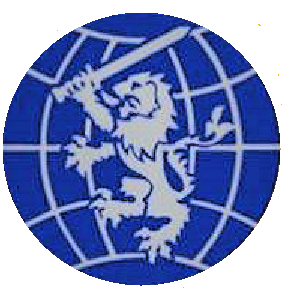
- 316 Bombardment Wing emblem (Note: Approved 27 Feb 1945. Description: A globe azure gridlined argent and charged with a lion rampant grasping a sword of the same [color].)

The 316th Airlift Division is an inactive United States Air Force organization. Its last assignment was with the United States Air Forces in Europe, assigned to Seventeenth Air Force, being stationed at Ramstein Air Base, Germany. It was inactivated on 1 May 1991.

== History ==
The 316th Bombardment Wing trained in the United States before transfer to Okinawa in August 1945. Assigned units ferried Allied prisoners of war from Japan to the Philippines.

In September 1953, the 316th Division manned, equipped, trained, and maintained assigned units until April 1960. It provided warning and defense against potential hostile air operations against the Moroccan region of North Africa.

In 1985, the division gained operational responsibility to implement war and contingency plans. It also provided host support to units in the Kaiserslautern Military Community as well as logistical support for other organizations in the European theater. In April–May 1991, assigned units deployed aircraft and personnel to Turkey in support of Operation Provide Comfort, a humanitarian relief effort to save the Kurds from starvation and resettle them in northern Iraq.

== Lineage ==
- Established as the 316th Bombardment Wing, Very Heavy on 4 August 1944

Activated on 14 August 1944
Redesignated 316 Composite Wing on 8 January 1946
Redesignated 316 Bombardment Wing, Very Heavy on 6 May 1946
Inactivated on 21 June 1948

- Redesignated 316 Air Division (Defense) on 26 June 1953

Organized on 18 September 1953
Discontinued on 1 April 1960

- Redesignated 316 Air Division on 1 June 1985

Activated on 14 June 1985
Inactivated on 1 May 1991

=== Assignments ===
- Second Air Force, 14 August 1944 (attached to XXII Bomber Command, c. 14 August – c. 7 December 1944
- Army Service Forces, 8 July 1945
- Eighth Air Force, 5 September 1945
- 1st Air Division, 13 June 1946 – 21 June 1948
- Seventeenth Air Force, 18 September 1953
- Seventeenth Air Force, 14 June 1985 – 1 May 1991

=== Stations ===
- Peterson Field, Colorado, 14 August 1944 – 7 July 1945
- Kadena (later Kadena Field, Kadena Army Air Base, Kadena Air Force Base), Okinawa, 17 August 1945 – 21 June 1948
- Rabat Salé Air Base, French Morocco (later Morocco), 18 September 1953 – 1 April 1960
- Ramstein Air Base, Germany, 14 June 1985 – 1 May 1991

=== Components ===
Wing

- 86th Tactical Fighter Wing: 14 June 1985 – 1 May 1991

Groups

- 22d Bombardment Group: 31 May 1946-by 31 May 1948
- 333d Bombardment Group: 31 August 1945 – 28 May 1946
- 346th Bombardment Group: 31 July 1945 – 30 June 1946
- 382d Bombardment Group: 31 August 1945 – 4 January 1946
- 383d Bombardment Group: 31 August 1945 – 3 January 1946

Squadrons

- 28th Photographic Reconnaissance Squadron: 15–29 May 1946
- 45th Fighter-Interceptor Squadron (later, 45th Fighter-Day Squadron): 18 September 1953 – 8 January 1958
- 324th Fighter-Interceptor Squadron: 1 July 1958 – 8 March 1960
- 357th Fighter-Interceptor Squadron: 18 September 1953 – 8 March 1960

=== Aircraft ===
- Boeing B-29 Superfortress, 1945–1948
- North American F-86 Sabre, 1953–1960
- North American F-100 Super Sabre, 1956–1957
- General Dynamics F-16 Fighting Falcon, 1985–1991.

== See also ==
- List of United States Air Force air divisions
