= 548th Combat Training Squadron =

United States Air Force squadron

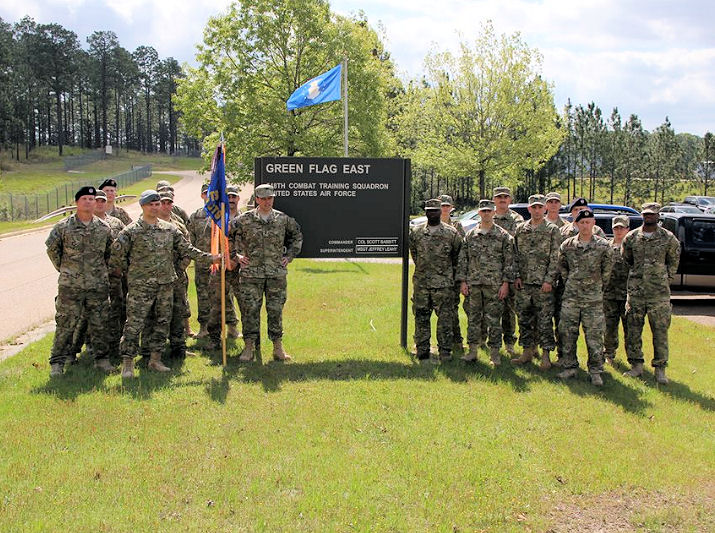
- Photo of the 548th Combat Training Squadron members at Fort Polk, Louisiana
- Active: 1944–1945; 1969–1973; 1994 – present
- Country: United States
- Branch: United States Air Force
- Type: Squadron
- Role: Combat Training
- Part of: 57th Operations Group
- Garrison/HQ: Fort Polk, Louisiana
- Engagements: World War II Asiatic-Pacific Theatre

- Decorations: Air Force Outstanding Unit Award (4x); Air Force Organizational Excellence Award (2x)

Insignia
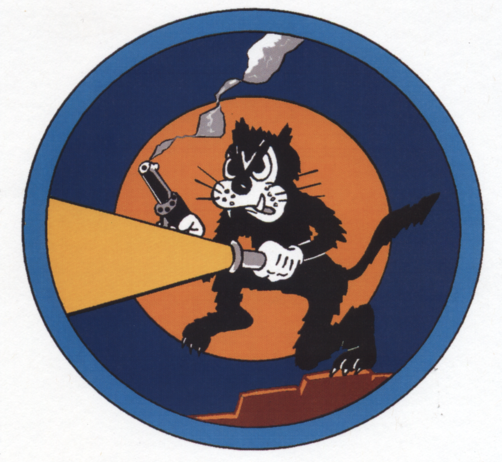
- 548th Combat Training Squadron emblem (approved 7 August 1944)

The 548th Combat Training Squadron was a United States Air Force squadron assigned to the 57th Operations Group at Fort Polk, Louisiana. It was geographically separated from the 57th, whose headquarters are at Nellis Air Force Base, Nevada. At Fort Polk, the squadron controlled multi-service close air support and forward air control aircraft and tactical air control assets in combat exercises with the US Army Joint Readiness Training Center. The unit closed April 2026 and is no longer supporting the JRTC mission or exercises at Ft Polk.

The unit was originally formed as the 548th Night Fighter Squadron in 1944. After training, it was deployed to Seventh Air Force and ordered to the Mariana Islands in the Central Pacific. Its mission was the air defense of Twentieth Air Force Boeing B-29 Superfortress airfields on Saipan and also on Iwo Jima. It also provided night escort for the B-29s in case of Japanese interceptor attacks. It later served on Okinawa where it was inactivated in December 1945.

The squadron was reactivated in 1969 during the Vietnam War as part of the 1st Air Commando Wing. Its mission was to train Republic of Vietnam Air Force aircrews in the operation of C-47 Skytrain "Puff The Magic Dragon" gunship operations to interdict North Vietnamese supply convoys and personnel movements along the Ho Chi Minh Trail. The squadron was inactivated in 1973 as part of the withdrawal of United States forces from the Vietnam War.

== Mission ==
The 548th Combat Training Squadron provides Air Combat Command-directed support to the U.S. Army's Joint Readiness Training Center located at Fort Polk, Louisiana.

The 548th accomplishes air liaison duties for the training center commander, exercises operational control of deployed fighter units to Barksdale Air Force Base, provides deployed unit maintenance and munitions support, schedules and controls exercise airspace, controls close air support missions, builds exercise scenarios, provides observers and controllers to evaluate tactical air control operations and replicates Air Force command and control from division through joint task force level.

The 548th serves as host to active Air Force, Air National Guard, Air Force Reserve, Marine and Navy units in combined arms training for both Army and Air Force contingency forces under conditions of low- to mid-intensity conflicts. Squadron members assist in the planning of Air Force operational support and participation in each exercise.

The Air Force supports deployments of personnel and equipment with strategic airlift and sustainment of forces in their operational area by theater airlift. Tactical aircraft provide the close air support to the Army contingent on the ground. Maintaining the ability to be successful in combat demands force-on-force training. The events that have occurred in Iraq, Bosnia and Afghanistan are representative of the kind of realistic training experience the combat units receive.

== History ==
=== World War II ===
The squadron was established on 23 March 1944 as the 548th Night Fighter Squadron at Salinas Army Air Base, California. It was part of the final group of dedicated night fighter interceptor squadrons formed by the Army Air Forces, being programmed to deploy to the Central Pacific. It was at Salinas that the squadron adopted its emblem, "Skopie" as in "radar-scope", that it still carries today. The squadron trained at various airfields in the San Joaquin Valley and was ready to deploy into combat by early September.

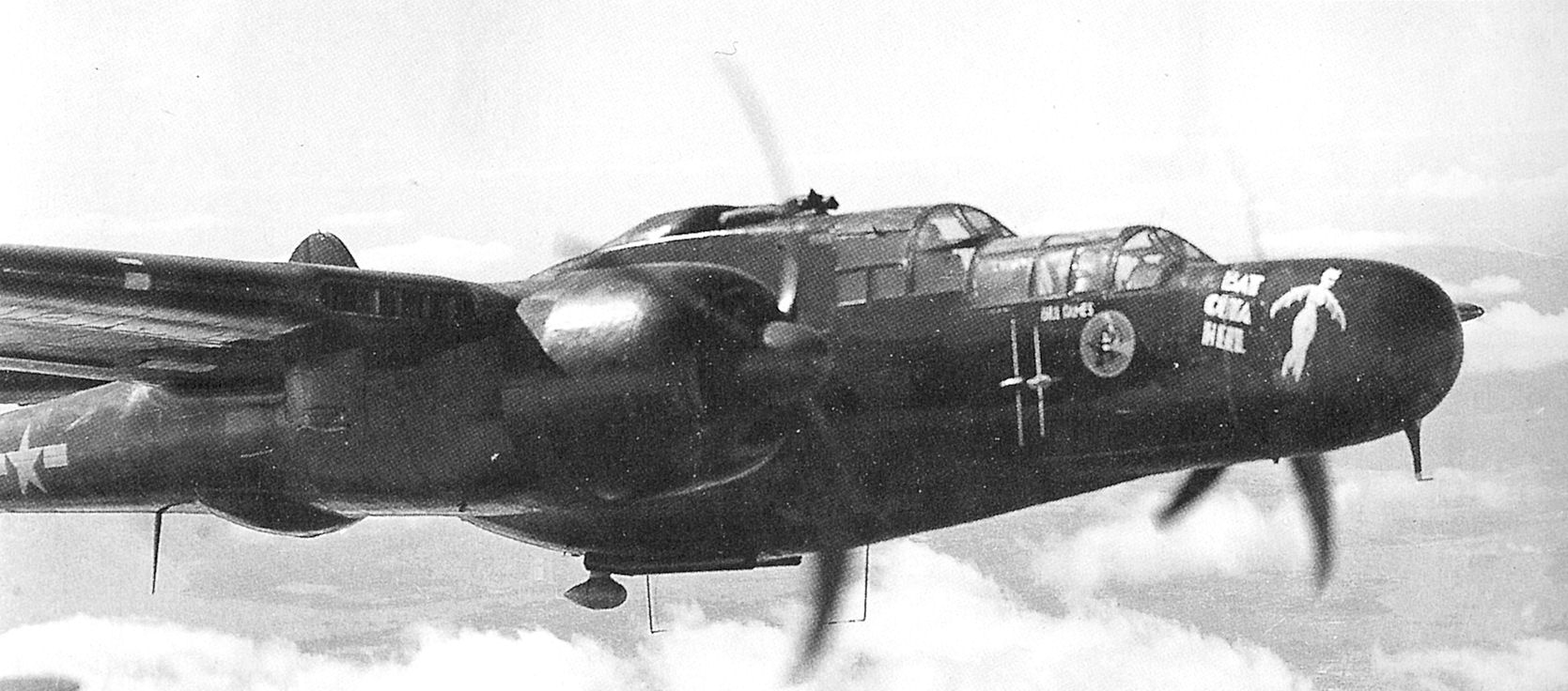
548th NFS P-61A Black Widow 42-5609, "Bat outta Hell"

The squadron moved by train to Seattle, Washington, where it boarded the USS General W. F. Hase, bound for Honolulu, Hawaii. Arriving after a two-week crossing, it remained at Hickam Field, until its aircraft and equipment arrived in Hawaii. At Hickam, it was assigned to Seventh Air Force, and its P-61s were sent through the Hawaiian Air Depot to modify the aircraft for operations in the Pacific Theater. After being part of the defense forces of Hawaii for several weeks, a detachment was sent to Isely Airfield, Saipan, on 15 December to provide night interceptor coverage of the new bases on Saipan and Guam for the Twentieth Air Force, which was going to use the airfields to carry out very long range strategic bombing of the Japanese Home Islands with the new B-29 Superfortress.

At the end of January 1945, the ground echelon of the squadron departed Hawaii, bound for newly captured Central Field, on Iwo Jima. Arriving in late February, the detachment on Saipan rejoined the squadron. The 548th was the first night-fighter squadron to arrive on Iwo Jima (on D+8). and even after its capture, Iwo Jima remained vulnerable to long range Japanese attacks, and its mission was to defend the new American airfields being built there.

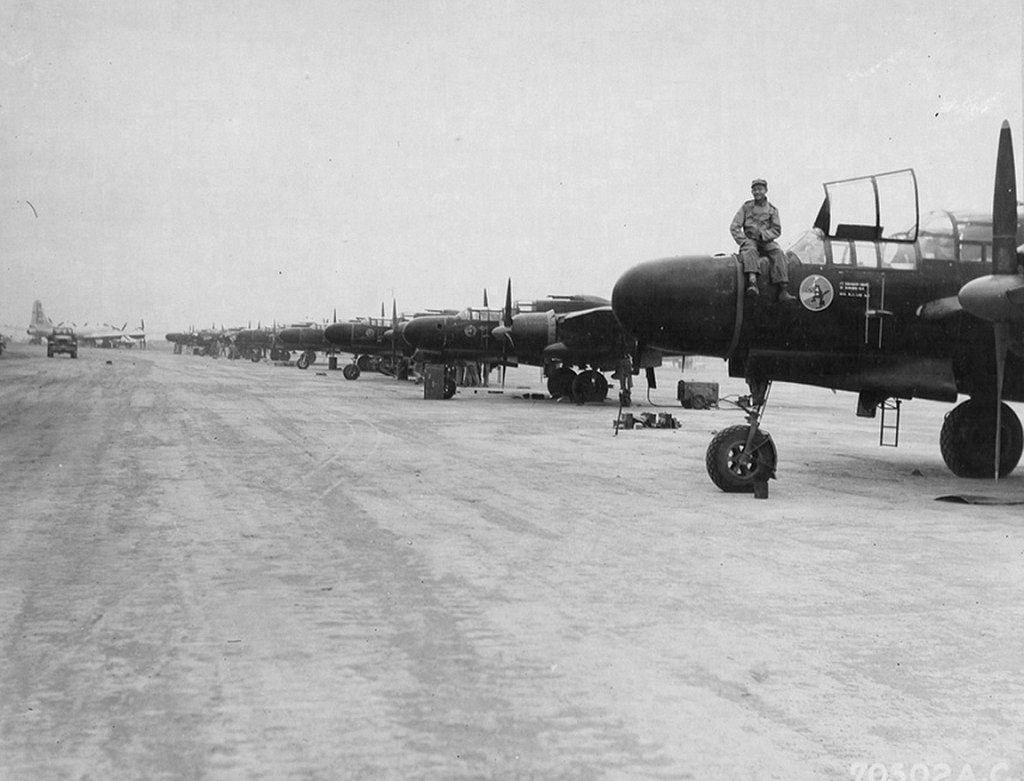
548th NFS Black Widows on the line at Central Field, Iwo Jima

A large percentage of the squadron's missions consisted of long-distance patrols over water, many of which involved interceptions of Japanese Mitsubishi G4M "Betty" bombers. Its presence, although rarely shooting down any enemy aircraft, did cause the bombers to jettison their loads and beat a hasty retreat from the area. The squadron moved to Ie Shima on 12 June just 3 miles off the coast of Okinawa to provide night interceptor patrols over Okinawa. It finished out the war doing night penetration raids and weather observations to support the B-29s bombing the Japanese home islands. It was during this time that the squadron scored its first two "kills" of enemy aircraft on 21 June. Two more "kills" were scored on 14–15 August, the last two aerial victories by American pilots in the Pacific War.

With the war over, the squadron's ground echelon were transferred to Occupied Japan to serve as part of the Army of Occupation in September, its aircraft being sent to storage depots on Okinawa and at Clark Field, Philippines. The 548th was inactivated as an administrative organization at Fort Lewis, Washington in December 1945.

=== Vietnam War ===
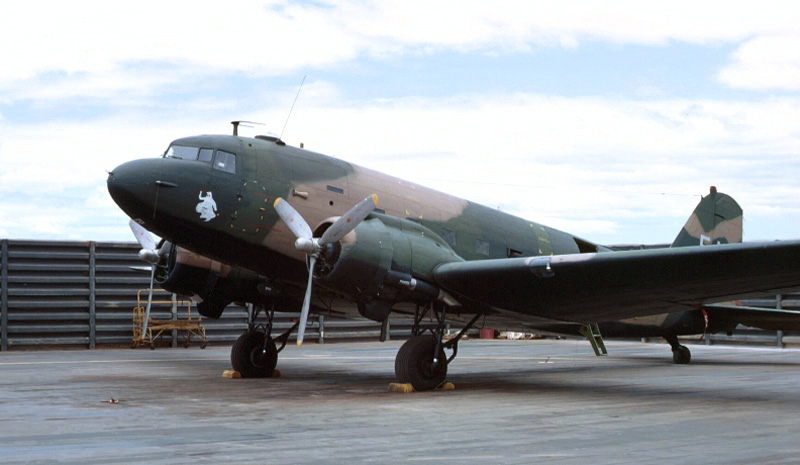
AC-47 Gunship

The squadron was reactivated in October 1969 at England Air Force Base, Louisiana as the 548th Special Operations Training Squadron. Its mission was to train Republic of Vietnam Air Force pilots and crews on the Douglas AC-47 Spooky gunship, which the United States was transferring to South Vietnamese control in the conflict. First configured in 1965, the AC-47 was equipped with three 7.62mm miniguns could selectively fire either 50 or 100 rounds per second. Cruising at 120 knots in a 3,000-foot circular orbit over its target, the AC-47 could put a bullet into every square yard of a football field-sized target in 3 seconds. And, ammunition holding out, it could do this intermittently while loitering over the target for hours.

The squadron trained Vietnamese crews on the Spooky until 1973 when it was inactivated with the end of American involvement in the Vietnam War and as part of the general inactivation of USAF special forces units.

=== Combat training ===
The squadron was again renamed, this time as the 548th Combat Training Squadron at Barksdale Air Force Base, Louisiana on 1 July 1994. The squadron also had a detachment located at Fort Polk, Louisiana. on 1 December 2010, the squadron and detachment "switched" as the Fort Polk element was expanded to become the squadron and the Barksdale element was reduced to detachment size.

=== Lineage ===
- Constituted as the 548th Night Fighter Squadron on 23 March 1944

Activated on 10 April 1944
Inactivated on 19 December 1945

- Redesignated 548th Special Operations Training Squadron on 22 August 1969
- Activated on 15 October 1969

Inactivated on 31 July 1973

- Redesignated 548th Combat Training Squadron on 24 June 1994
- Activated on 1 July 1994

=== Assignments ===
- Fourth Air Force, 10 April 1944
- 7th Fighter Wing, 16 September 1944
- Seventh Air Force, 20 October 1944
- VII Fighter Command, 28 October 1944
- AAF, Pacific Ocean Area

Attached to 301st Fighter Wing, 8 June 1945

- Seventh Air Force, 14 July-19 December 1945
- 4410 Combat Crew Training Wing (later, 4410 Special Operations Training Group), 15 October 1969 – 31 July 1973
- 608 Air Operations Group, 1 July 1994
- USAF Air Ground Operations School, 3 February 1998
- 57th Operations Group, 4 October 2007 – present

=== Stations ===
- Salinas Army Air Base, California, 10 April 1944
- Delano Army Air Field, California, 26 June – 2 September 1944
- Hickam Field, Hawaii, 16 September 1944
- Kipapa Airfield, Hawaii, 17 October 1944

Detached: Isely Field, Saipan, Mariana Islands, 15 December 1944

- East Field, Saipan, Mariana Islands, 26 January 1945

Detached: (Ground Echelon), North Field (Iwo Jima), Bonin Islands 28 February 1945

- Central Field (Iwo Jima), Iwo Jima, 25 February 1945
- Ie Shima, 8 June–1 December 1945
- Fort Lewis, Washington, 17–19 December 1945
- England Air Force Base, Louisiana, 15 October 1969 – 31 July 1973
- Barksdale Air Force Base, Louisiana, 1 July 1994 - 30 November 2010
- Fort Polk, Louisiana, 1 December 2010 – Spring 2026

=== Aircraft ===
- Douglas P-70 Havoc, 1944
- Northrop P-61 Black Widow, 1944–1945
- Douglas C-47 Skytrooper, 1969–1973
- Douglas AC-47 Spooky, 1969–1973
- Douglas EC-47 Phyllis Ann, 1969–1973

== See also ==
- 481st Night Fighter Operational Training Group
