= 549th Combat Training Squadron =

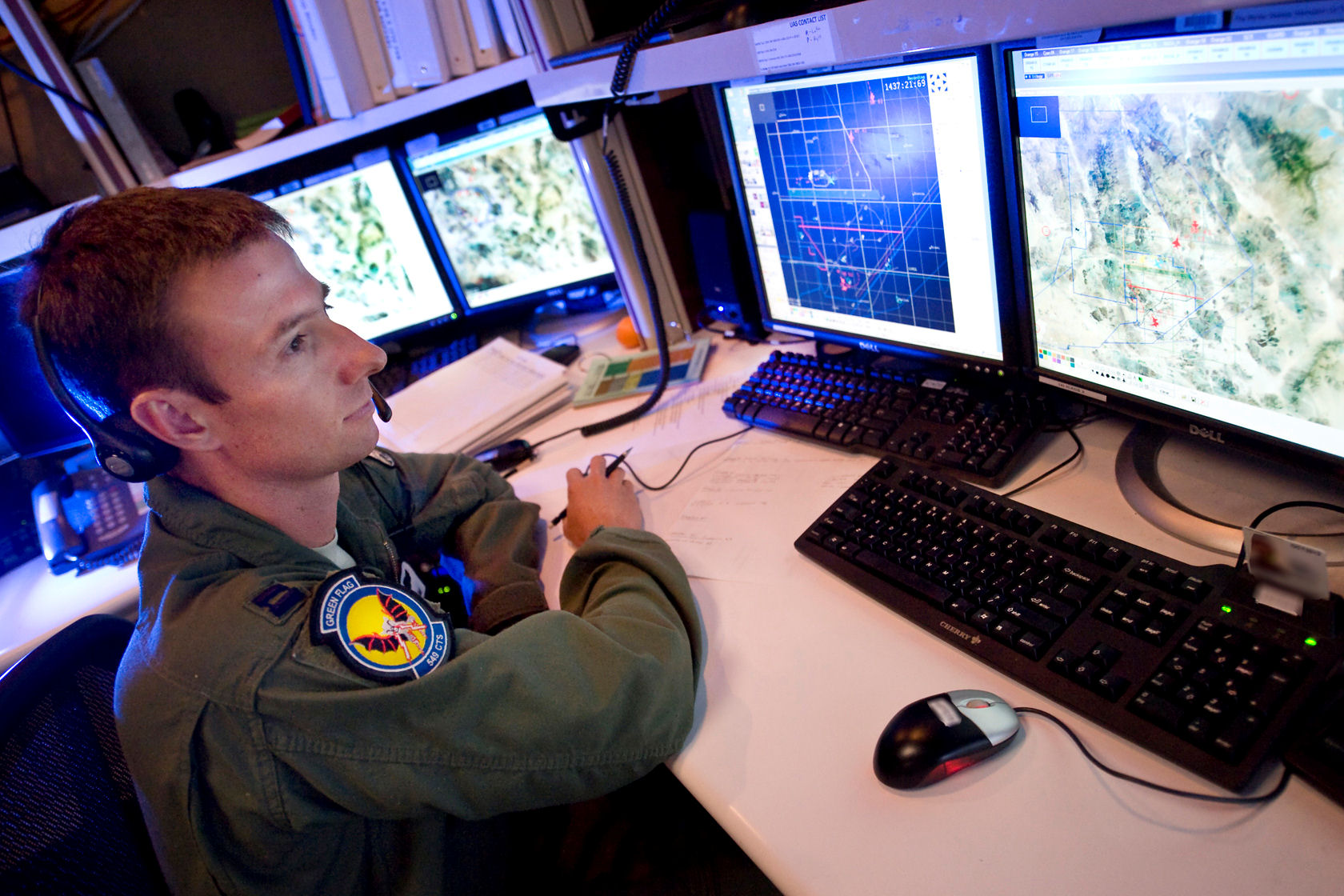
- A close air support instructor, 549th Combat Training Squadron observes aircraft movement and communications between joint terminal attack controllers and pilots during Green Flag West 10-9 exercises
- Active: 1944–1947; 1969-1988; 1991 – present
- Country: United States
- Branch: United States Air Force
- Type: Squadron
- Role: Combat Training
- Part of: 57th Operations Group
- Garrison/HQ: Nellis Air Force Base, Nevada
- Engagements: World War II Asiatic-Pacific Theatre

- Decorations: Air Force Outstanding Unit Award (7x); Air Force Organizational Excellence Award (3x)

Insignia
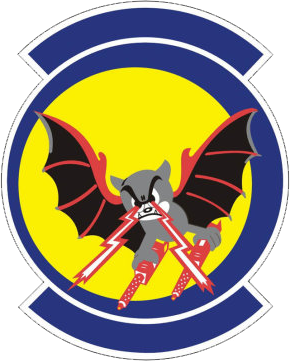
- Emblem of the 549th Combat Training Squadron (approved 17 July 1944)

The 549th Combat Training Squadron is a non-flying United States Air Force unit. It is assigned to the 57th Operations Group, and is stationed at Nellis Air Force Base, Nevada. It conducts air support and air interdiction sorties in "Green Flag (West)" exercises to train USAF fighter pilots and the aerospace power component to the US Army's brigade combat training.

The unit was originally formed as the 549th Night Fighter Squadron in 1944. After training, it was deployed to Seventh Air Force and ordered to the Mariana Islands in the Central Pacific. Its mission was the air defense of Twentieth Air Force Boeing B-29 Superfortress airfields on Iwo Jima. It also provided night escort for the B-29s in case of Japanese interceptor attacks. It later served on Okinawa where it was inactivated in December 1945.

The squadron was reactivated during the Vietnam War as a training unit of the 1st Special Operations Wing, training USAF and South Vietnamese forward air controllers to direct tactical fighter bombers in attacks on communist forces. After the end of American involvement in Southeast Asia, it continued the training mission until 1988.

== Mission ==
The 549th Combat Training Squadron hosts Green Flag-West exercises, a realistic air-surface integration combat training exercise involving the air forces of the United States and its allies, is primarily conducted in conjunction with US Army Combat Training Center exercises at Fort Irwin, California. It is a close air support and joint exercise administered by the United States Air Force Air Warfare Center and Nellis Air Force Base through the 549th Combat Training Squadron.

== History ==
=== World War II ===
The squadron was established on 1 April 1944 as the 549th Night Fighter Squadron at Hammer Field, California. It was part of the final group of dedicated night fighter interceptor squadrons formed by the Army Air Forces, being programmed to deploy to the Central Pacific. The squadron trained at various airfields in the San Joaquin Valley with the Douglas P-70 Havoc and YP-61 Black Widow night fighter and was ready to deploy into combat by late October.

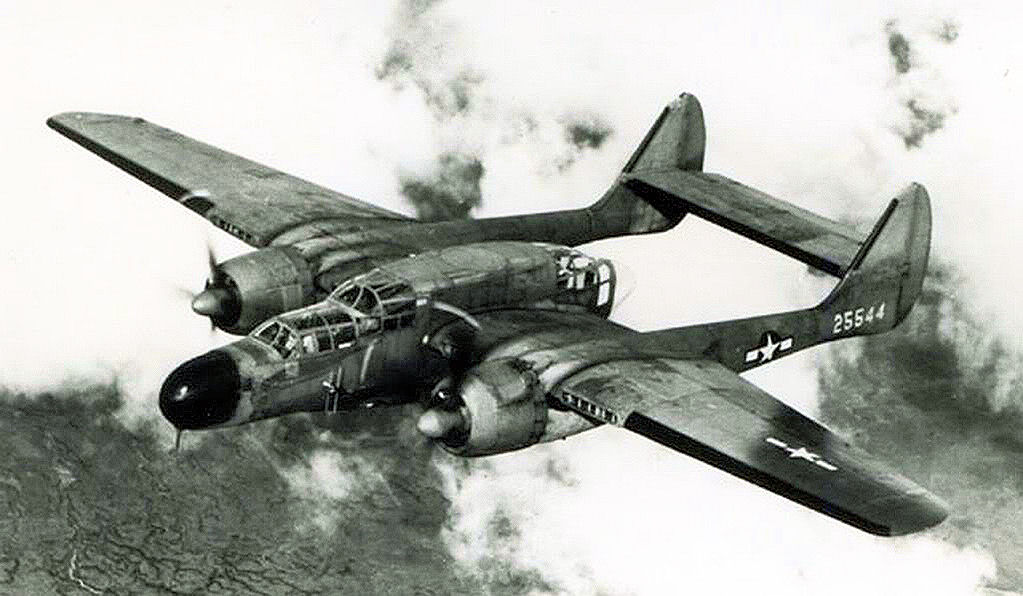
549th NFS Northrop P-61A-5-NO Black Widow 42-5544

The squadron moved by train to Seattle, Washington where it boarded a troop ship bound for Honolulu in the Hawaiian Islands. Arriving after a two-week crossing, it remained at Hickam Field, until its aircraft and equipment arrived in Hawaii. At Hickam, it was assigned to Seventh Air Force, and its Northrop P-61 Black Widows were sent through the Hawaiian Air Depot to modify the aircraft for operations in the Pacific Theater. After being part of the defense forces of Hawaii for several weeks, it was deployed to East Field, Saipan in late February 1945 to provide night interceptor coverage of the new bases on Saipan and Guam for the Twentieth Air Force, which was going to use the airfields to carry out very long range strategic bombing of the Japanese Home Islands with the new B-29 Superfortress.

After a month on Saipan, the squadron moved to the newly captured Central Field, on Iwo Jima in March 1945. Even after its capture, Iwo Jima remained vulnerable to long range Japanese attacks, and its mission was to defend the new American airfields being built there. A large percentage of the squadron's missions consisted of long-distance patrols over water, many of which involved interceptions of Japanese Mitsubishi G4M "Betty" bombers. Its presence, although rarely shooting down any enemy aircraft, did cause the bombers to jettison their loads and beat a hasty retreat from the area. The squadron remained assigned to Iwo Jima for the balance of the Pacific War, flying long range missions over eastern China and night interdiction missions to chi Chi Jima. It was demobilized there in early 1946, and inactivated on 5 February as an administrative unit

The squadron was reactivated briefly on 26 June 1946 as part of the 21st Fighter Group at Northwest Field on Guam. It was not manned or equipped due to personnel shortages and was inactivated again in February 1947.

=== Cold War ===
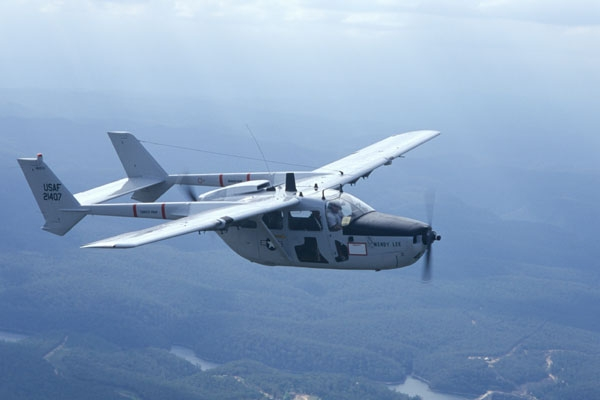
Cessna O-2A-CE Super Skymaster (s/n 67-21407) in flight.

The squadron was reactivated in 1969 as the 549th Tactical Air Support Training Squadron, training USAF and South Vietnamese forward air controllers (FAC)to direct tactical fighter bombers in attacks on communist forces in addition to the psychological warfare mission. It employed the Cessna O-2 Skymaster. Visual reconnaissance formed the core FAC mission during the Vietnam War, as the FAC flew light aircraft slowly over the rough terrain at low altitude to maintain constant aerial surveillance. The rugged jungle terrain of South Vietnam readily hid enemy troop movements, and the jet fighter-bombers flew so fast that pilots had great difficulty in distinguishing between enemy troops, friendly troops, and civilians. Forward air controllers directed the air strikes thus became essential in usage of air power. By patrolling the same area constantly, the FACs grew very familiar with the terrain, and they learned to detect any changes that could indicate enemy forces hiding below, and frequently drew ground fire from the communist forces.

It continued the FAC training mission after the United States withdrawal from the Vietnam War, providing Direct Air Support Center and Tactical Air Control Party personnel and equipment to support US Army units. It was inactivated on 1 July 1988.

== Lineage ==
- Constituted as the 549th Night Fighter Squadron in April 1944

Activated on 1 May 1944
Inactivated on 5 February 1946

- Activated on 25 June 1946

Inactivated on 19 February 1947

- Redesignated 549th Tactical Air Support Training Squadron on 18 Aug 1969

Activated on 15 Oct 1969
Inactivated on 1 Jul 1988

- Redesignated 549th Joint Training Squadron, and activated, on 1 Nov 1991

Redesignated 549th Combat Training Squadron on 1 Jul 1994

=== Assignments ===
- Fourth Air Force, 1 May 1944

Attached to 319th Wing, 1 May-c. 4 Oct 1944

- 7th Fighter Wing, 20 Oct 1944
- VII Fighter Command, 1 Nov 1944
- Army Air Forces, Middle Pacific, 16 Jul 1945

Attached to:VII Fighter Command, 16 Jul-c. 20 Nov 1945
Attached to: Twentieth Air Force Combat Staging Center, 20 Nov – 3 Dec 1945
Attached to: Iwo Jima Base Command, Provisional, 3 Dec 1945-

- Seventh Air Force, 1 Jan – 5 Feb 1946

Remained attached to Iwo Jima Base Command, Provisional, to 5 Feb 1946

- 20th Fighter Wing, 25 Jun 1946 – 19 Feb 1947

Attached to 21st Fighter Group, 25 Jun 1946 – 19 Feb 1947

- 1st Special Operations Wing (later 834th Tactical Composite Wing, 1st Special Operations Wing), 15 Oct 1969
- 549th Tactical Air Support Training Group, 15 Dec 1975 – 1 Jul 1988
- 57th Operations Group, 1 Nov 1991
- USAF Air Ground Operations School, 3 Feb 1998
- 57th Operations Group, 4 Oct 2007 – present

=== Stations ===
- Hammer Field, California, 1 May 1944
- Meadows Field, Bakersfield, California, 26 July – 4 October 1944
- Kipapa Gulch Airfield, Hawaii, 20 October 1944 – 15 February 1945
- East Field, Saipan, Mariana Islands (Air Echelon), 20 February 1945 – 20 March 1945

North Field, Iwo Jima, Bonin Islands (Japan) (Ground Echelon), 14 March 1945 – 5 February 1946

- Northwest Field, Guam, Marianas Islands, 25 June 1946 – 19 February 1947
- Eglin Air Force Auxiliary Field No. 9 (Hurlburt Field), FL, 15 October 1969
- Patrick Air Force Base, Florida, 15 December 1975 – 1 July 1988
- Nellis Air Force Base, Nevada, 1 November 1991 – present

=== Aircraft ===
- Douglas P-70 Havoc, 1944
- Northrop P-61 Black Widow, 1944–1946
- North American OV-10 Bronco, 1969–1988
- Cessna O-2 Skymaster, 1975–1986
- Fairchild Republic A-10 Thunderbolt II, 1991 – present
- General Dynamics F-16 Fighting Falcon, 1991 – present

== See also ==
- 481st Night Fighter Operational Training Group
