= 19th Airlift Squadron =

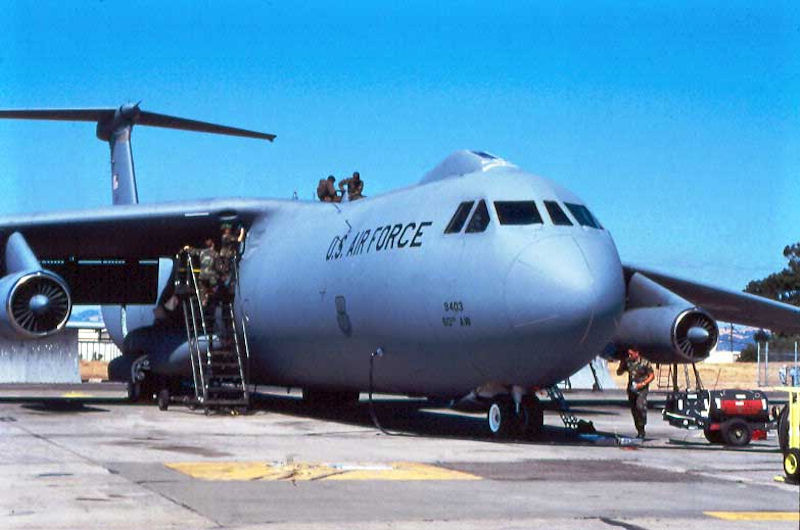
- 19th Squadron C-141B Starlifter
- Active: 1941–1948; 1952–1955; 1984–1996
- Country: United States
- Branch: United States Air Force
- Role: Airlift
- Motto: Orient Express (1992–1993)
- Engagements: World War II (Asia-Pacific Theater) Korean War

- Decorations: Air Force Outstanding Unit Award (2x) Republic of Korea Presidential Unit Citation

Insignia
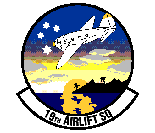
- 19th Airlift Squadron Emblem (approved 5 June 1953, reinstated 4 October 1993) (Note: The 1953 emblem replaced an emblem approved 30 May 1944, but brought all elements within the disc. Endicott, p. 463, Maurer, Combat Squadrons, pp. 104–105)

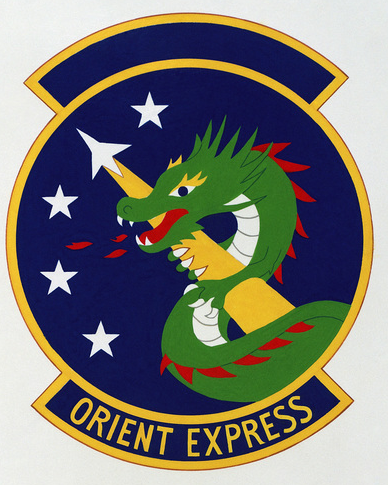
- 1403d Military Airlift Squadron emblem (approved 26 June 1986)

The 19th Airlift Squadron is an inactive United States Air Force unit. It was last assigned to the 60th Operations Group, Travis Air Force Base, California. The last sortie was flown on 2 August 1996 and the unit inactivated effective 30 September 1996.

== History ==
=== World War II ===
The 19th Airlift Squadron was constituted as the 19th Transport Squadron on 22 November 1940. It was activated on 1 January 1941 at Hickam Field, Hawaii, the squadron was assigned to Hawaiian (later, Seventh) Air Force, flying the Douglas C-33 (DC-2). During the course of World War II, the squadron would conduct aerial transportation within the Hawaiian Islands and to forward bases in the Pacific. In May 1942, the squadron was moved over to the adjoining John Rogers Airport (now Honolulu International Airport) due to space issues at Hickam.

The squadron was redesignated the 19th Troop Carrier Squadron on 5 July 1942. That same year, the unit transitioned to the C-53 aircraft. The following year, it converted to the C-57 and C-47. In 1944, the Squadron added the C-45 to its inventory. On 15 August, the 19th became assigned to VI Air Service Area Command and the following year, on 15 December 1945, to AAF, Middle Pacific.

=== Cold War ===
With the end of the war, the 19th continued its intra-theater operations in the Hawaiian Islands. It was reassigned 4-engined C-54 Skymasters and also C-46 Commandos. In 1948 it was transferred to Bergstrom AFB in Texas and assigned to Tactical Air Command. However, the squadron deployed to Wiesbaden Air Base in Germany in June 1948 in response to the urgent need for C-54 transports due to the Berlin Airlift. There it flew constant missions in the Berlin Air Corridor to airports in West Berlin and back to Wiesbaden. The 19th remained in Occupied Germany until it was inactivated on 26 August 1948 with its aircraft being assigned to other units in Occupied Germany.

It was re-designated as the 19th Troop Carrier Squadron, Medium, on 23 May 1952, the squadron was reactivated on 10 June 1952 at Brady AB, Japan. The squadron flew with the C-46 aircraft under the 315th Troop Carrier Group. Its mission at Brady was to provide passenger transportation between South Korea, Japan and other US bases in the Western Pacific. The squadron inactivated on 18 January 1955 due to budget reductions.

=== Modern era ===
The last generation of the squadron was activated as the 1403d Military Airlift Squadron, which was designated, and activated, on 1 August 1984 at Yokota Air Base in Japan. The squadron had been attached to 316th Tactical Airlift Group, and then the 374th Tactical Airlift Wing starting on 1 October 1989. Its mission was to provide intra-theater airlift for high-ranking PACAF and civilian officials and small mission–essential equipment, flying C-12 Huron twin-engine prop planes, and in 1985, upgrading to the C-21 Learjet. The squadron was designated the 19th Airlift Squadron on 1 April 1992 and assigned to the 316th Airlift Support Group, before being reassigned on 1 June 1992 to the 374th Operations Groups.

The 19th AS was transferred to the 60th Operations Group, Travis AFB, California on 1 October 1993, in a name-only re-designation of the 7th Airlift Squadron.

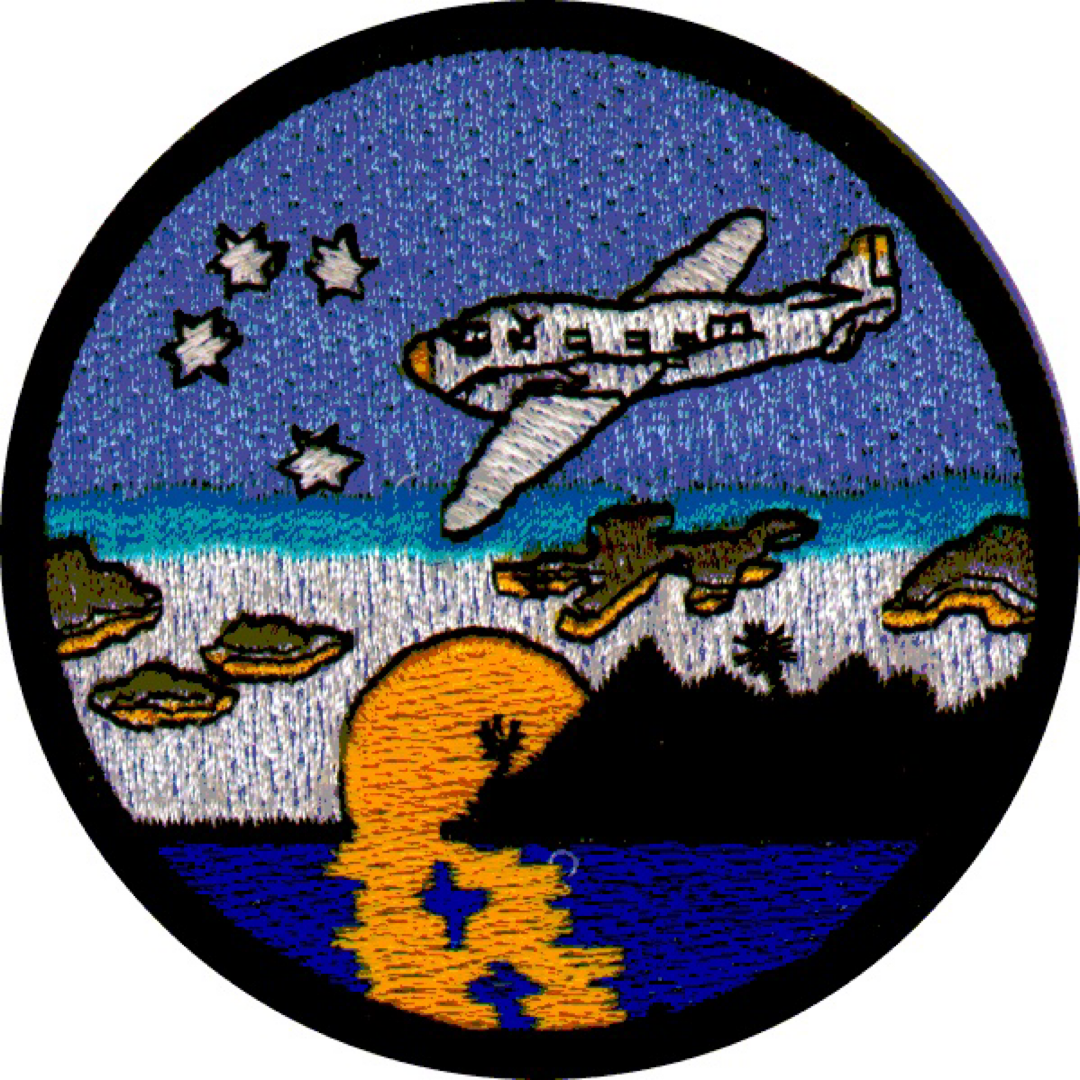
19th Airlift Squadron patch (Travis AFB)

Its VIP aircraft at Yokota were transferred back to the United States. In turn, the 19th took over the C-141B Starlifters and mission of the 7th as part of the re-designation, as part of an Air Force initiative to retain low-numbered units on active duty. With a final flight and inactivation ceremony on 2 Aug 1996, the squadron was inactivated on 30 September 1996 as part of the retirement of the C-141 fleet.

== Lineage ==
19th Airlift Squadron

- Constituted 'as the 19th Transport Squadron on 22 November 1940

Activated on 1 January 1941
Redesignated: 19th Troop Carrier Squadron on 5 July 1942
Inactivated on 26 August 1948

- Redesignated: 19th Troop Carrier Squadron, Medium on 23 May 1952

Activated on 10 June 1952
Inactivated on 18 January 1955

- Consolidated with the 1403d Military Airlift Squadron as the 19th Airlift Squadron on 1 April 1992

Inactivated on: 30 September 1996

1403d Military Airlift Squadron

- Designated as the 1403d Military Airlift Squadron and activated on 1 August 1984
- Consolidated with the 19th Troop Carrier Squadron as the 19th Airlift Squadron on 1 April 1992

=== Assignments ===
- Hawaiian (later, Seventh) Air Force, 1 January 1941
- VI Air Service Area Command, 15 August 1944
- AAF, Middle Pacific, 15 December 1945
- Pacific Air Command, 1 January 1946
- 403d Troop Carrier Group, 31 May 1946
- 374th Troop Carrier Group, 15 October 1946
- Seventh Air Force (later, Pacific Air Command), 1 January 1947
- Ninth Air Force, 17–26 Aug 1948

Attached to Airlift Task Force [Prov], Jul-26 Aug 1948

- 315th Troop Carrier Group, 10 Jun 1952 – 18 Jan 1955
- 316th Tactical Airlift Group, 1 August 1984
- 374th Tactical Airlift Wing, 1 October 1989
- 316th Airlift Support Group, 1 April 1992
- 374th Operations Group, 1 June 1992
- 60th Operations Group, 1 Oct 1993 – 30 Sep 1996

=== Stations ===
- Hickam Field, Hawaii, 1 January 1941
- John Rodgers Airport, Hawaii, 29 May 1942
- Hickam Field, Hawaii, 1946
- Bergstrom AFB, Texas, 17–26 Aug 1948

Detachment operated from Rhein-Main Air Base, Germany, 2 Jul-26 Aug 1948

- Brady Air Base, Japan, 10 Jun 1952 – 18 Jan 1955
- Yokota Air Base, Japan, 1 Aug 1984 – 1 Oct 1993
- Travis AFB, 1 Oct 1993 – 30 Sep 1996

=== Aircraft ===
- Douglas C-33, 1941–1942
- C-53 Skytrooper, 1942–1945
- C-57 Lodestar, 1943–1946
- C-47 Skytrain, 1943–1946
- C-45 Expeditor, 1944–1946
- C-54 Skymaster, 1946–1948
- C-46 Commando, 1946–1948; 1952–1954
- C-12 Huron, 1984–1993
- C-21 Learjet, 1985–1993
- C-141B Starlifter, 1993–1996
