= 38th Bombardment Squadron =

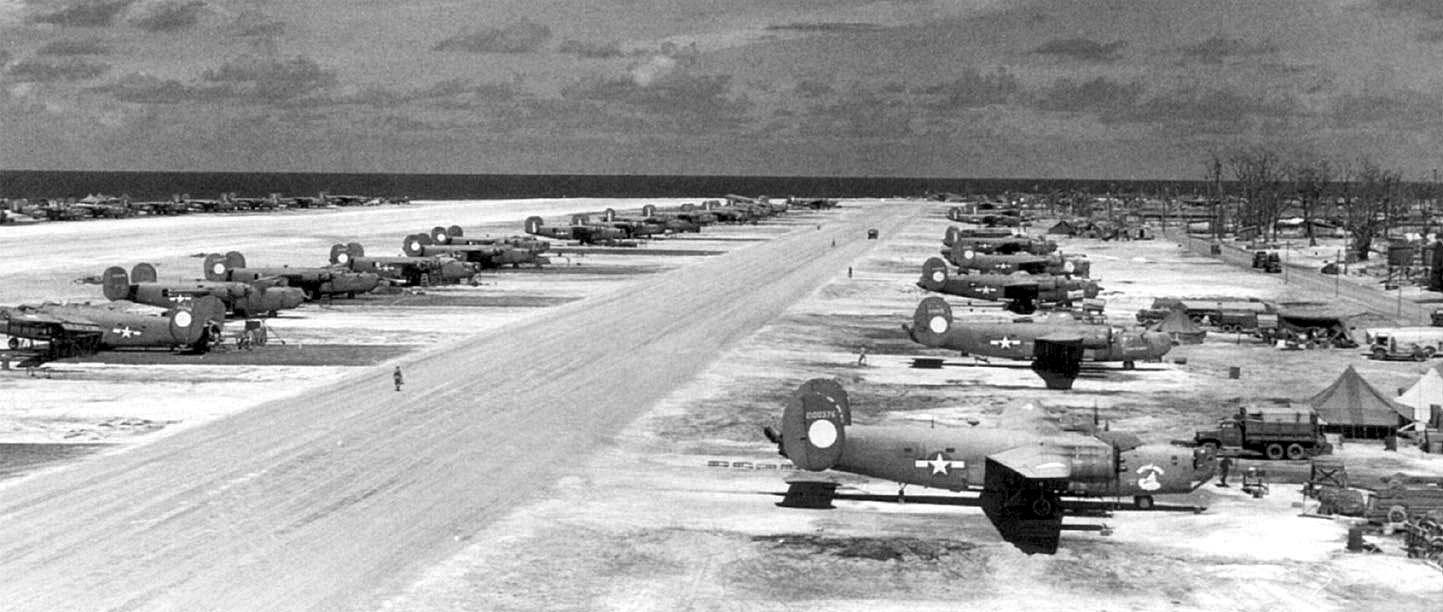
- B-24 Liberators of the 27th and 38th Bombardment Squadrons at Kwajalein in June 1944
- Active: 1940–1946
- Country: United States
- Branch: United States Air Force
- Role: heavy bomber
- Engagements: American Theater of Operations; Pacific Theater

Insignia
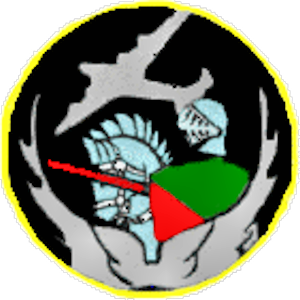
- 38th Bombardment Squadron emblem (Note: Approved 28 April 1945.)

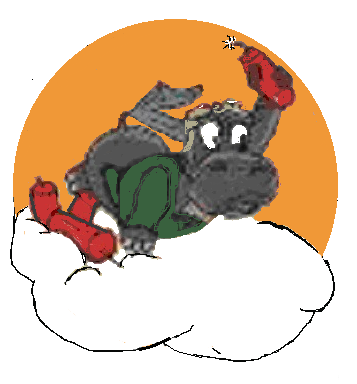
- 38th Bombardment Squadron emblem (early)

Aircraft flown
- Bomber: See #Aircraft below

The 38th Bombardment Squadron is an inactive United States Air Force unit. Its last assignment was with the 30th Bombardment Group, based at Kahuku Army Airfield, Hawaii Territory. It was inactivated on March 20, 1946.

== History ==
Established as a Fourth Air Force bombardment squadron in November 1940 as part of the USAAC's buildup of forces after the outbreak of World War II in Europe; equipped with Douglas B-18 Bolos and early Boeing YB-17 Flying Fortress prototypes.

Deployed to Third Air Force after the Attack on Pearl Harbor, engaged in antisubmarine patrols over the southeast Atlantic coastline. Returned to California in late December flying antisubmarine warfare patrols and training replacement crews with Lockheed A-29 Hudsons. It continued to perform this duty until October 1943, when the squadron was moved to Hawaii to join Seventh Air Force.

Trained with early Consolidated LB-30 Liberators and North American B-25 Mitchells in Hawaii until November, then re-equipped with Very Long Range Consolidated B-24 Liberators and deployed to the Central Pacific in November 1943 to take part in the island hopping campaign. Moved to Funafuti Airfield, Nanumea in the Gilbert Islands. Mounted bombing raids against enemy installations on those islands. It also raided airfields in the Marshall Islands to help prevent the launching of Japanese planes against the amphibious assault on Tarawa.

Staging through the recently captured Tarawa and Makin Islands, the squadron attacked several atolls in the Marshalls, including Kwajalein. Between November 14, 1943, and April 1, 1944, the squadron carried out bombing missions over the Marshall Islands and participated in the actual invasion of Kwajalein in February 1944.

As the war moved closer to Japan, the squadron attacked Truk. The 38th also bombed Wake Island, Guam, Saipan, and harassed other islands in the Caroline and Mariana Islands, bypassed by American amphibious forces.

In August 1944, the squadron moved to East Field (Saipan) in the Mariana Islands. During the next six months, the 38th conducted intensive bombing strikes against airfields and shipping at Bonin and Volcano Islands, Iwo Jima, ChiChi Jima, and Yap. Its final bombing mission was at Iwo Jima on February 19, 1945, the same day three Marine divisions invaded the island.

In March 1945, the 38th returned to Hawaii on the popular but mistaken rumor that it was to be reequipped with Consolidated B-32 Dominators. Instead, many of the crews and planes were reassigned to the 11th Bombardment Group and subsequently served with it. The remaining elements waited out the war conducting training sorties and routine patrols. Inactivated on 20 March 1946.

== Lineage ==
- Constituted as the 38th Bombardment Squadron (Heavy) on 20 November 1940

Activated on 15 January 1941
Redesignated 38th Bombardment Squadron, Heavy c.1944
Inactivated on 20 March 1946

=== Assignments ===
- 30th Bombardment Group, 15 January 1941 – 20 March 1946

=== Stations ===
- March Field, California, 15 January 1941
- New Orleans Army Air Base, Louisiana, 3 June 1941 (detachment operated from Hunter Field, Georgia, 8–14 December 1941
- Muroc Army Air Field, California, 24 December 1941
- March Field, California, 9 February 1942 – 28 September 1943
- Kahuku Army Air Field, Hawaii, 20 October 1943
- Funafuti Airfield, Nanumea, Gilbert Islands, 12 November 1943 (operated from Makin Airfield, Gilbert Islands after 26 February 1944)
- Kwajalein Airfield, Marshall Islands, 13 March 1944 (operated from Makin Airfield, Gilbert Islands until 22 March 1944)
- East Field (Saipan), Mariana Islands, 4 August 1944
- Wheeler Field, Hawaii, 17 March 1945
- Kahuku Army Air Field, Hawaii, 21 September 1945 – 20 March 1946

=== Aircraft ===
- Boeing YB-17 Flying Fortress, 1941
- Douglas B-18 Bolo, 1941–1942
- Consolidated LB-30 Liberator, 1942
- Lockheed A-29 Hudson, 1942
- North American B-25 Mitchell, 1942
- Consolidated B-24 Liberator, 1942–1946
