= Hamasaki =

Hamasaki or Hamazaki (written: 浜崎 lit. "seashore cape") is a Japanese surname. Notable people with the surname include:

- Ayumi Hamasaki (浜崎 あゆみ, born 1978), Japanese singer-songwriter, actress and model
- Masahiro Hamazaki (浜崎 昌弘, 1940–2011), Japanese footballer
- Shinji Hamazaki (浜崎 真二, 1901–1989), Japanese baseball player and manager
- Yuhua Hamasaki (born 1990), American drag queen

== See also ==
- Hamasaki Station, a railway station in Karatsu, Saga Prefecture, Japan
