= 15th Operations Group =

15th Operations Group

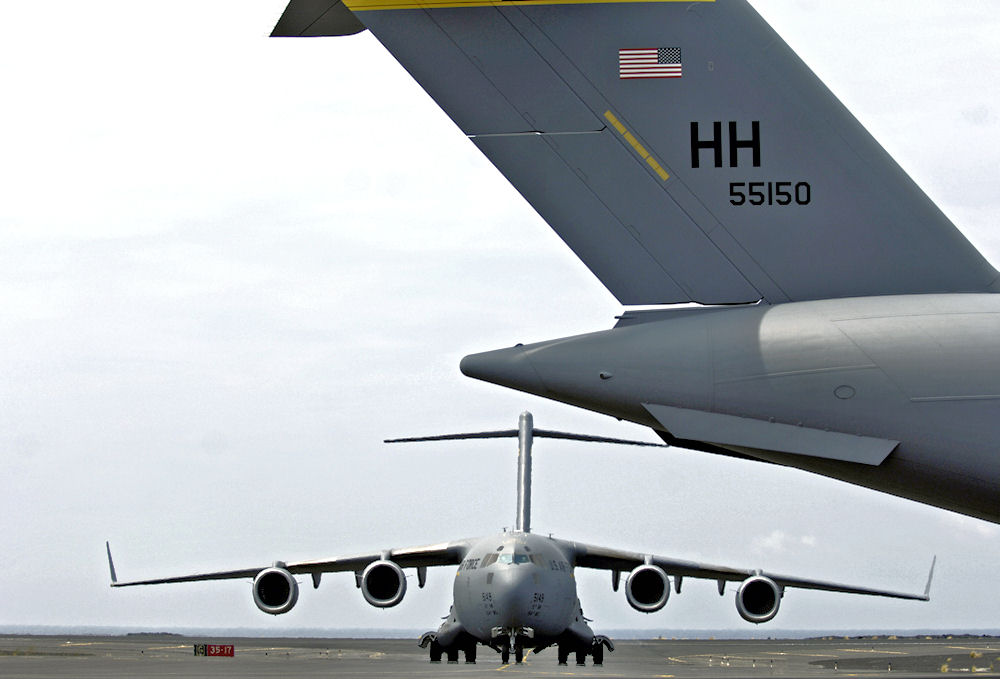
- Boeing C-17A Globemaster III of the 535th Airlift Squadron
- Active: 1992–present
- Country: United States
- Branch: United States Air Force
- Type: Composite group
- Role: Airlift and Fighter
- Part of: 15th Wing
- Garrison/HQ: Hickam Air Force Base
- Decorations: Air Force Outstanding Unit Award

Insignia
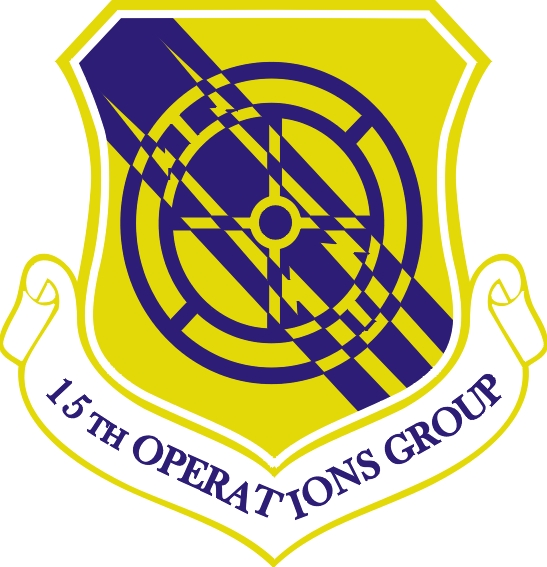
- 15th Operations Group emblem(approved 15 March 1963 for the 15h Wing based on an emblem approved 5 October 1942)
- Tail Code: HH
- Tail Flash

The 15th Operations Group (15 OG) is the flying component of the 15th Wing, assigned to the United States Air Force Thirteenth Air Force. The group is stationed at Hickam Air Force Base, Hawaii. It is also responsible for managing operational matters at Bellows Air Force Station, Hawaii and Wake Island Airfield.

The 15th Operations Group has three operational squadrons assigned flying C-17, F-22, C-40B, and C-37A aircraft along with an operational support squadron supporting the Commander, U.S. Pacific Command and the Commander, Pacific Air Forces.

== History ==
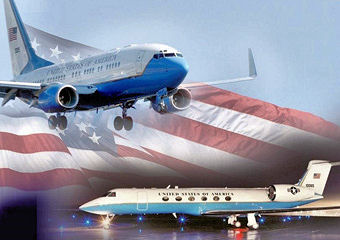
65th Airlift Squadron Special Air Mission aircraft

On 1 April 1992 the 15th Operations Group was activated when the USAF objective wing organization was implemented for the 15th Air Base Wing implementing the USAF objective wing organization. Upon activation, the 15th OG assumed responsibility from the 15th Air Base Wing for managing operational matters at Hickam AFB and Bellows AFS, Hawaii; and Wake Island Airfield. The group also provided command and control for the defense of the Hawaiian Islands and directed tactical control of Hawaii Air National Guard alert F-15 aircraft. It was assigned the flying squadrons previously assigned to the wing.

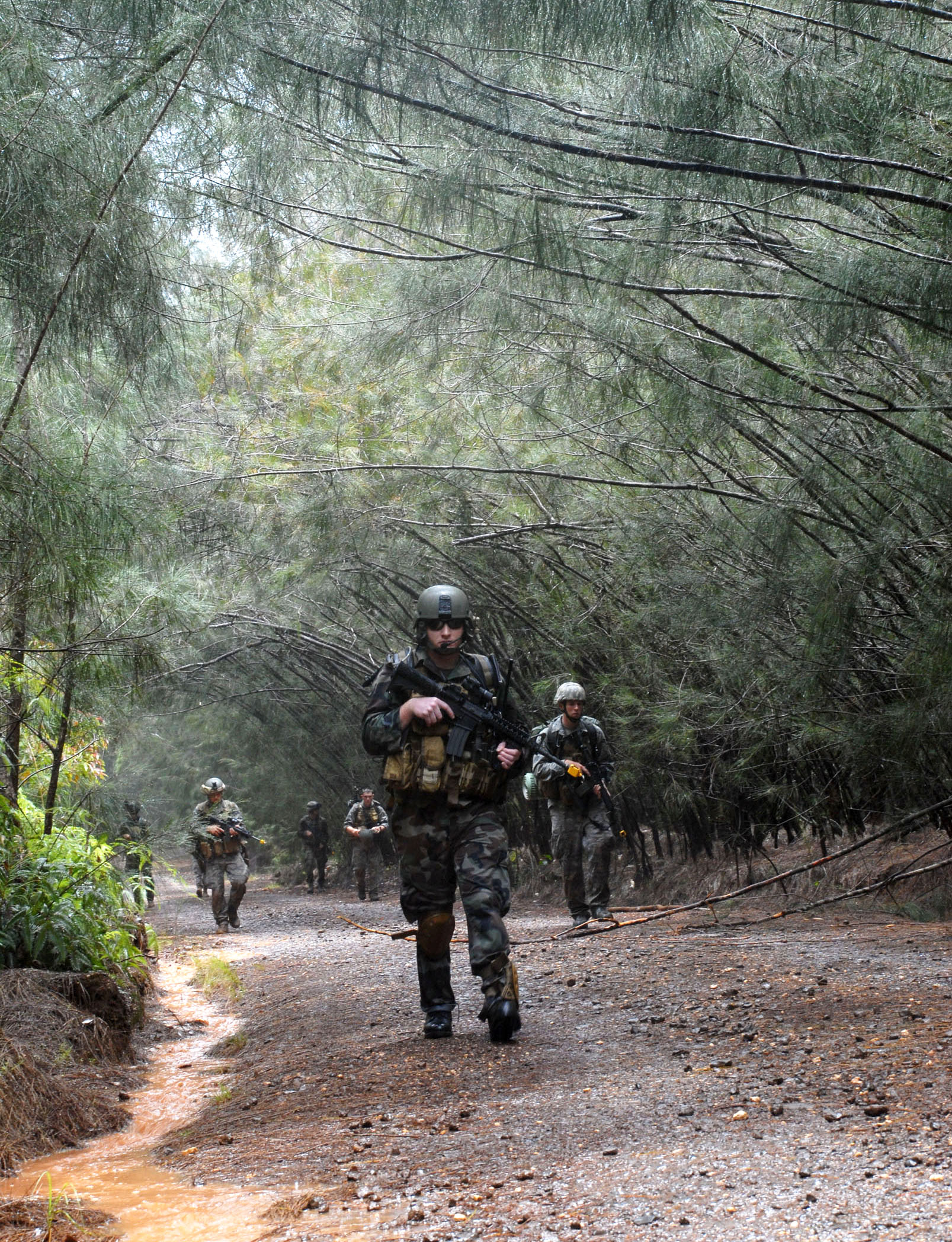
TACP of the 25th Air Support Operations Squadron

Its 25th Air Support Operations Squadron provided combat ready tactical air control parties ready to advise on the employment of air assets in training and combat and to deploy worldwide with each brigade and battalion of the U.S. Army's 25th Infantry Division and other designated ground components. Beginning in 1992, the group had one airlift squadron assigned and equipped with specially configured C-135 aircraft, which provided transportation for the Commander, US Pacific Command, Commander, Pacific Air Forces, and other high-ranking civilian, military, and foreign dignitaries.

Added C-37 aircraft in 2002 and C-40 aircraft in 2003; retired C-135 aircraft in 2003. Assigned second airlift squadron in 2005.

The 15th Operations Group is integrated with the 154th Operations Group of the Hawaii Air National Guard in the "total force" concept. Three of its four flying squadrons have associate units of the Guard integrated with them:

- The 19th Fighter Squadron and the 199th Fighter Squadron
- The 535th Airlift Squadron and the 204th Airlift Squadron
- The 96th Air Refueling Squadron and the 203d Air Refueling Squadron

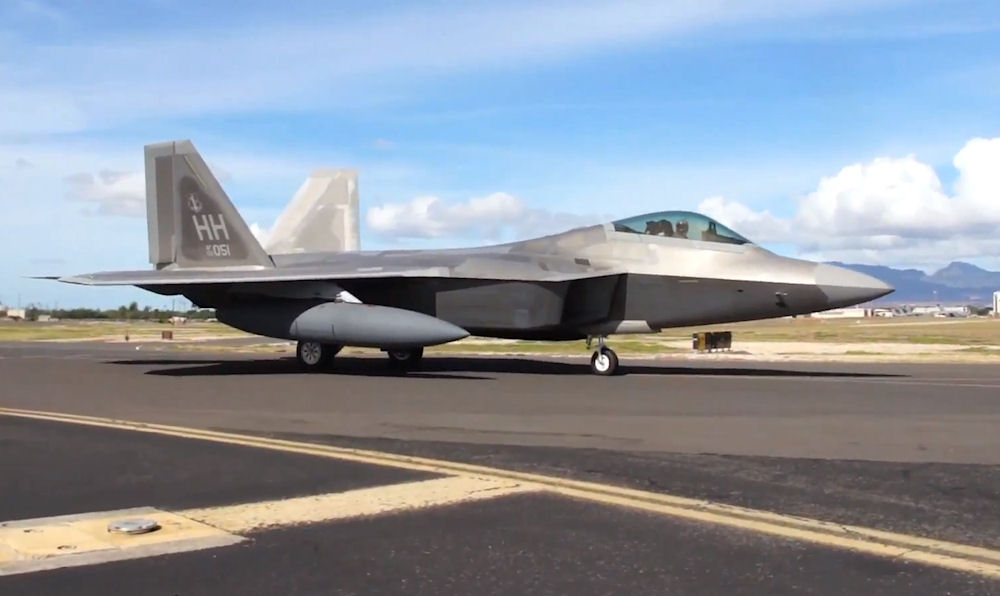
19th Fighter Squadron Lockheed Martin F-22A Raptor

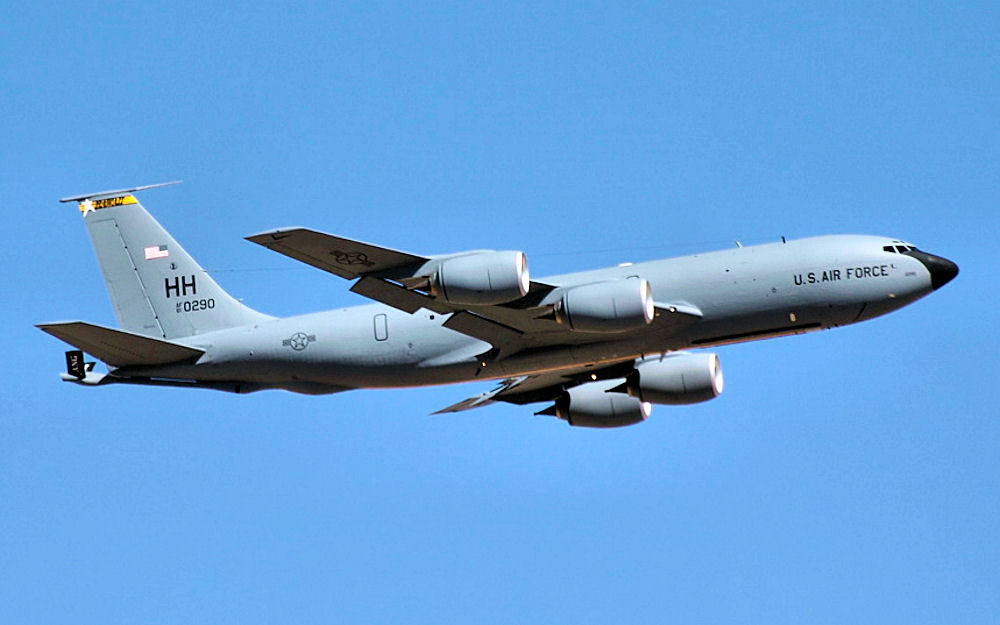
96th Air Refueling Squadron Boeing KC-135R Stratotanker

In 2010, the group added more aircraft to its inventory, when the 19th Fighter Squadron and 96th Air Refueling Squadron were activated. However, the air refueling squadron was inactivated in September 2015.

=== Components in 2018 ===
The 15th Operations Group (Tail Code: HH) consists of the following squadrons:

- 15th Operations Support Squadron
- 19th Fighter Squadron (Lockheed-Martin F-22 Raptor)
- 65th Airlift Squadron (Gulfstream C-37 and Boeing C-40 Clipper) "Special Missions Hawaii"
- 535th Airlift Squadron (McDonnell Douglas C-17 Globemaster III)

=== Lineage ===
- Constituted as 15 Operations Group on 1 April 1992

Activated on 13 April 1992

=== Assignments ===
- 15th Air Base Wing (later 15th Wing), 13 April 1992 – present

=== Components ===
- 15th Air Intelligence Squadron: 13 April 1992 – 1 June 1994
- 15th Operations Support Squadron: 13 April 1992 – present
- 19th Fighter Squadron: 4 October 2010 – present
- 25th Air Liaison Squadron (later 25th Air Support Operations Squadron): 13 April 1992 – 19 October 2008
- 65th Airlift Squadron: 13 April 1992 – present
- 96th Air Refueling Squadron: 23 July 2010 – 3 September 2015
- 535th Airlift Squadron: 18 April 2005 – present

=== Stations ===
- Hickam Air Force Base, Hawaii, 13 April 1992 – present

=== Aircraft assigned ===
- Boeing C-135 Stratolifter, 1992–2003
- Gulfstream C-37, 2002–present
- Boeing C-40, 2003–present
- McDonnell Douglas C-17 Globemaster III, 2005–present
- Boeing KC-135 Stratotanker, 2013–2015
- Lockheed-Martin F-22 Raptor, 2010–present
