= Kualoa Airfield =

Kualoa Airfield
- Part of Seventh Air Force
- Oahu, near Kaaawa, Hawaii, USA
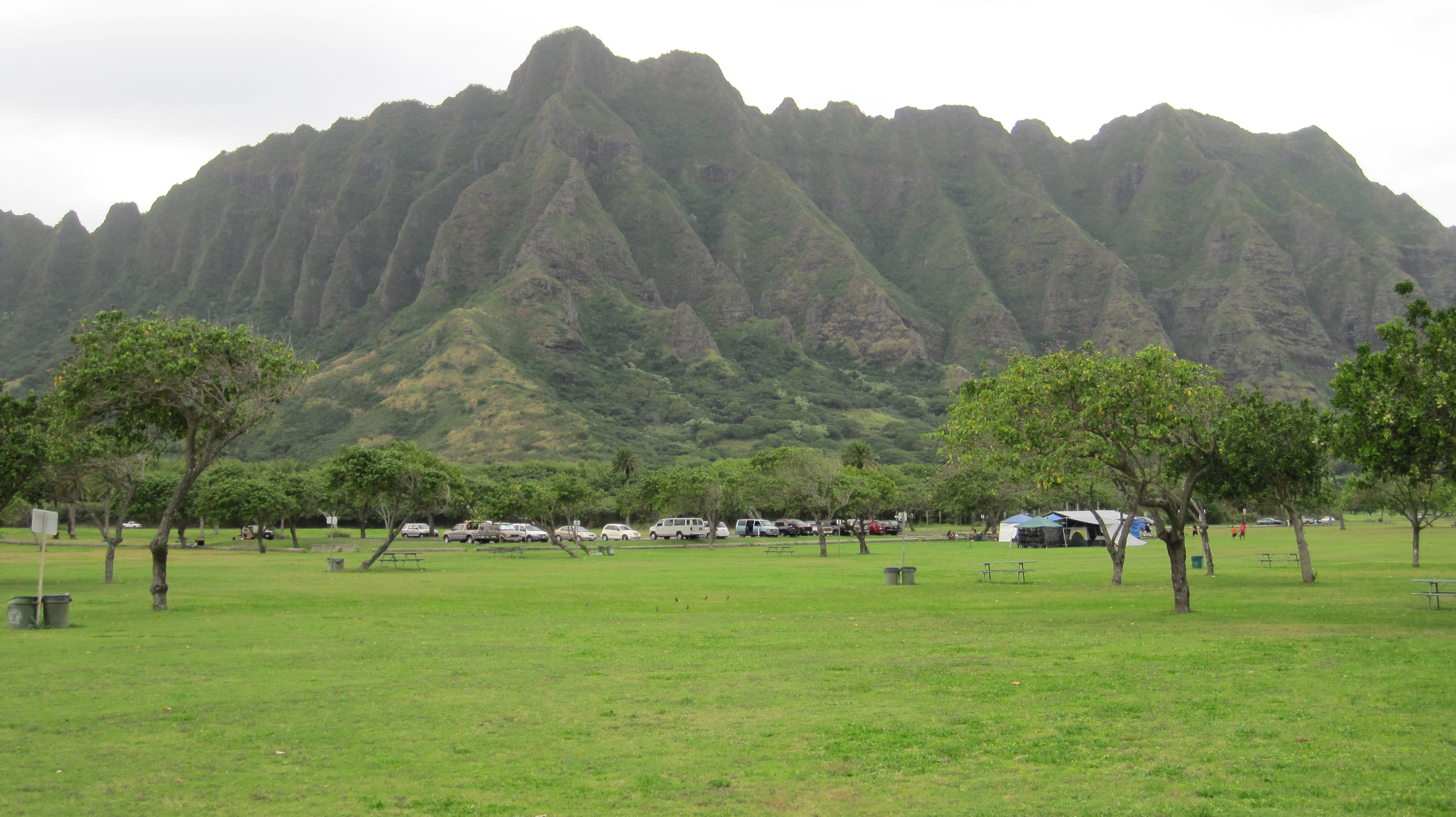
- The southern end of the runway is now a park

Site information
- Type: Military airfield
- Controlled by: United States Army Air Forces

Location
- Coordinates: 21°31′35″N 157°50′22″W

Kualoa Airfield is a former wartime airfield on Oahu, Hawaii. Part of it is now the Kualoa Regional Park.

== See also ==
- Hawaii World War II Army Airfields
