= Kipapa Airfield =

Kipapa Airfield
- Part of Seventh Air Force
- Mililani Town, Oahu, Hawaii, USA

Site information
- Type: Military airfield
- Controlled by: United States Army Air Forces

Location
- Coordinates: 21.440070°N 158.019120°W

Kipapa Airfield was an airfield on Oahu, Hawaii during World War II. Its name is derived by the Hawaiian word kīpapa which means 'pavement or level terrace' in Hawaiian.

One runway was built early 1942 by the US military for the United States Army Air Corps. Two more runways were added. The three intersecting runways were used by the Seventh Air Force. After the war on July 1, 1947 the base was closed and put under the Hawaii Aeronautics Commission (HAC). Hawaii Aeronautics Commission leased the base to private and student fliers company on July 23, 1948. The operation closed in 1950 with one runway 1,700 feet by 200 feet. A new flying school opened in 1951 and closed in 1958. There is no trace of the base today, part of the base in now Mililani District Park.

Units at Kipapa Airfield for part of the war:

- 5th Bomber Group, 31st Bomber Squad with B-17 and B-18
- 15th Fighter Group, 6th NFS with P-70)
- 318th Fighter Group, 19th with Curtiss P-40 Warhawk
- 307th Bomber Group, 370th with B-24)
- 7th AF, 28th PRS North American P-51 Mustang
- 7th FW, 548th Night Fighter Squad with Northrop P-61 Black Widow
- 7th FW, 549th Night Fighter Squad with Northrop P-61 Black Widow
- 7th AF, 6th Night Fighter Squad with Republic P-47 Thunderbolt and P-61s
- 30th BG, 27th Bomber Squad with B-24

== See also ==
- Hawaii World War II Army Airfields
