= 623rd Air Control Squadron =

623D Air Control Squadron
- Active: 1943–1973; 1979–1980; 1983–present
- Country: United States
- Branch: United States Air Force
- Type: Command and Control
- Part of: Pacific Air Forces; 5th Air Force; 18th Wing; 18th Operations Group
- Garrison/HQ: Kadena Air Base
- Nicknames: "OKINAWA CONTROL": 2 Jul 1946 – 7 Jul 1956; "WAYSIDE": 31 Jul 1956 – 8 Jul 1973; "LIGHTSWORD": 1 April 1983 – present
- Motto: SEMPER VIGILANTES
- Mascot: Fightin' Yagi

Commanders
- Current commander: Lt Col Elias “Rogue” Yousefi: June 2025 – present

Insignia
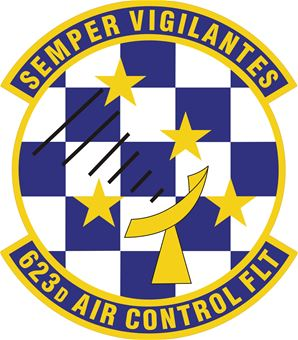
- 623D Air Control Flight emblem (newly rendered 20 Dec 2007)

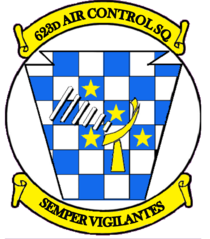
- 623rd Air Control Squadron emblem (Approved 1 Apr 1992)

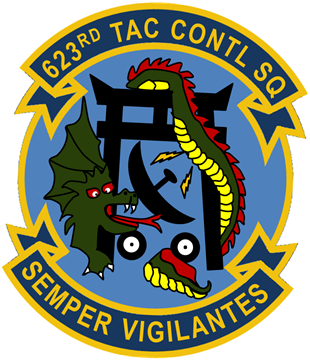
- 623rd Tactical Control Squadron emblem (Approved 1 Apr 1983)

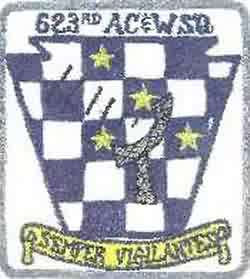
- 623rd Aircraft Control & Warning Squadron emblem (Approved on 2 Dec 1963)

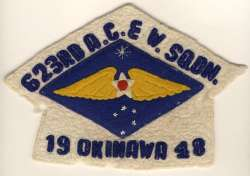
- 623rd Aircraft Control & Warning Squadron emblem, when part of the Far East Air Force (1948)

The 623rd Air Control Squadron (623 ACS) is an operational unit of the United States Air Force assigned to the 18th Wing. The 623d is based out of Kadena Air Base, Okinawa, Japan. The 623d is tasked to provide Command & Control within a sector of the Japanese Air Defense System. The 623d conducts operations out of Japanese Air Self Defense Force facilities located at Naha Air Base, Kasuga Air Base and Iruma Air Base. The 623d operates the Southwest Sector Interface Control Cell, conducting joint and bilateral tactical datalink operations.

== Mission ==
Primary mission is two-fold (1) is to provide rapidly deployable Theater Control Operations Teams (TCOT) in order to coordinate and direct US air and air defense artillery (ADA) employment within a sector of the Japan Air Defense Ground Environment (JADGE) system. When activated as a TCOT the unit is directly subordinate to 613th Air Operations Center Chief of Combat Operations. (2) Operate Japan's Joint/Bilateral Southwest Sector Interface Control Cell (SICC), to fuse joint and multinational data provided by regional C2 units, track producers, and tactical data link (TDL) participants to execute Integrated Air & Missile Defense (IAMD) and Ballistic Missile Defense (BMD) operations in support of the Defense of Japan.

== History ==
=== World War II ===
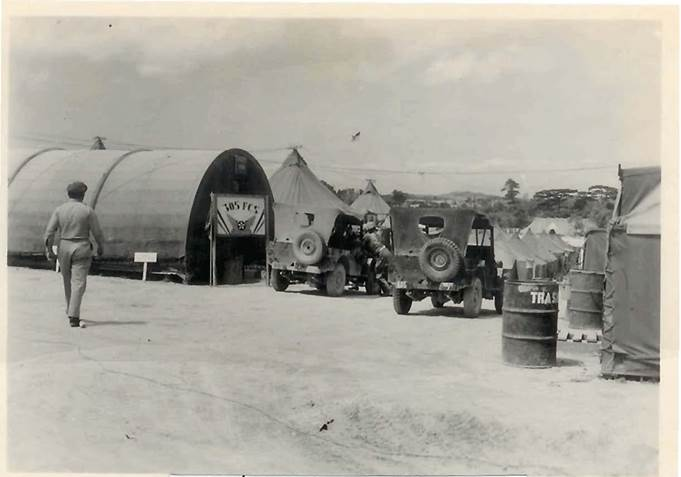
Headquarters 305th FCS, Camp Bishigawa, Okinawa 1945

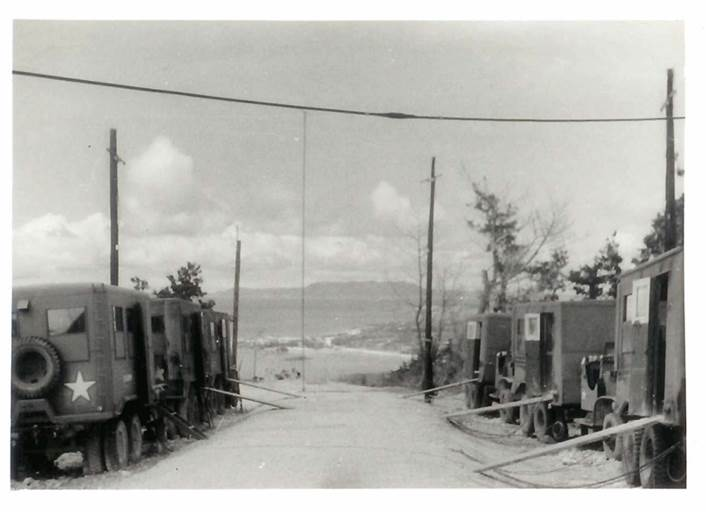
Radar and Comm Vans line the top of Yontan, looking north, Okinawa 1945

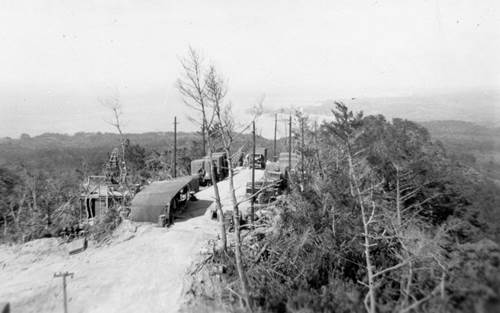
Yontan Radar "Walter Control", Camp Bishigawa, Okinawa 1946

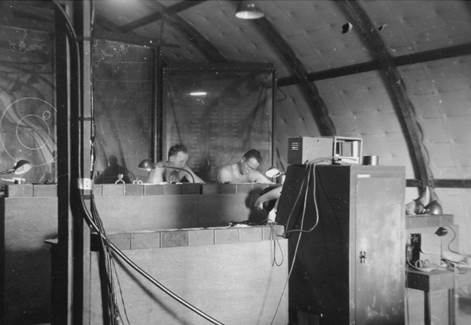
Radar Plotting Room of the 305th FCS, Camp Bishigawa, Okinawa, Japan 1945

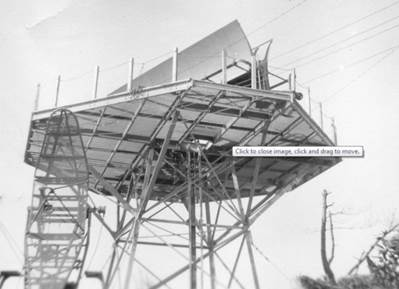
Sq Radars MPS-5 and Lil' Abner, 1940s

The 623D Air Control Squadron, traces its origins to the 305th Fighter Control Squadron (FCS), United States Army Air Forces. The 305th FCS was originally organized on 31 March 1943, then activated 1 April 1943 at Bradley Field, Connecticut, but not manned until 7 April (by temporary personnel from the 93rd Fighter Control Squadron, the unit responsible for training the 305th FCS). Permanent personnel began arriving on 10 April, and on 21 April the squadron's commander arrived. All temporary personnel were released about this same time. By late August 1943 the 305th FCS was adequately manned to start operational training. While at Bradley Field, the 305th FCS served as the operational training unit for First Air Force's I Fighter Command. The 305th FCS provided fighter control training for single-engine P-47 Thunderbolt fighter groups, which obtained their new aircraft from the Republic Aviation production plant on Long Island prior to their deployment to overseas combat theaters. The 305th FCS accomplished the controlling of aircraft and furnishing homing facilities by means of semi-mobile VHF radio control net with stations located at various sites in Connecticut. The 305th FCS then moved to Blackstone Army Airfield, Virginia on 1 September 1943, where it again served as an operational training unit, this time for Third Air Force's III Fighter Command. The 305th FCS again provided fighter control training for newly arriving P-47 Thunderbolts and P-51 Mustangs as they became available. While controlling fighters in the Blackstone area, the 305th FCS conducted training with a signal air warning company and AAA battalions. The 305th FCS was alerted for an overseas move in October, but was subsequently removed from the list. After a short stint at Blackstone Army Airfield, the 305th FCS moved to Galveston Army Airfield, Texas on 20 December 1943. Here in Galveston the 305th FCS joined the 72nd Fighter Wing. This time the 305th FCS controllers were training the 2nd Air Force pilots on how to work with fighter control. With its primary mission in Galveston, the 305th FCS sent detachments throughout the Second Air Force's area to train fighter control missions. Four detachments went to Nebraska, another to Louisiana, and a sixth to another location in Texas. The squadron was alerted on 24 March 1944 for an overseas move, and in April all of the outlying detachments were pulled back to Galveston Army Airfield. The 305th FCS left Galveston Army Airfield on 3 May 1944 en route to Fort Lawton, Seattle, Washington.

After being moved to Fort Lawton, Washington, on 3 May 1944, the 305th FCS began preparations for embarkation to the Pacific Theater. The 305th FCS departed Fort Lawton on 25 May 1944 in transit to the Territory of Hawaii aboard the Cape Newenham. The squadron reached Stanley Army Air Field, Territory of Hawaii on 2 June 1944. There the 305th was assigned to Seventh Air Force's VII Fighter Command. A training program commenced on 16 June, with the 305th FCS being assisted initially by the 318th Fighter Control Squadron and, from 1 July, by the 302nd Fighter Control Squadron. On 15 August 1944 the squadron was relieved from assignment to the VII Fighter Command and joined the 7th Fighter Wing of Army Air Forces Pacific Ocean Area (AAFPOA). The 305th FCS was attached on 1 September 1944 to the 7th Provisional Control Group (Special), of the 7th Wing. On 5 October the squadron moved to Bellows Field and was subsequently called upon to furnish cadre for a number of new fighter control squadrons. On 20 January 1945, the 305th FCS was attached to the new 7th Fighter Wing Aircraft Warning Control Group. Detachment 1 305th FCS, was formed at Bellows Field on 15 February 1945 and on 19 March moved to a combat zone initially attached to the 318th Fighter Group. Detachment 1, 305th FCS came to Japan as part of the Tactical Air Force, Tenth Army Ryuku Islands invasion force. This force served as the joint US Army Air Forces and US Marine Corps airpower arm for Tenth Army during Operation ICEBERG. By the end of April 1945, Detachment 1 305th FCS had moved to Ie Shima to provide fighter control for the three runways and various fighter units located on the island. Detachment 2 305th FCS, was organized at Bellows Field on 5 March 1945 and moved to a combat zone by April 1945. Detachment 2 was located at Guam when discontinued on 14 July 1945. The squadron itself was moved to Fort Shafter, Territory of Hawaii, on 4 April 1945 in order to prepare for movement to a forward zone. All local operations came to a standstill late in June as the squadron prepared for its movement. On 27 June the 305th FCS was reassigned back to Seventh Air Force. Detachment 1 305th FCS earned the Ryukus campaign streamer, but the 305th Squadron itself earned only the Asiatic-Pacific Service Streamer for its World War II duty.

Streamer for Asiatic-Pacific Campaign Medal

After the initial invasion operations of Okinawa, the Headquarters 305th FCS moved from Fort Shafter, T.H., 15 July 1945, to Kadena, Okinawa. Although arriving initially to Kadena in early September 1945 the squadron as eventually headquartered at Camp Bishigawa, Okinawa by the end of September 1945. The 305th FCS established the Okinawa Air Control Center at Camp Bishigawa, call sign "Okinawa Control" with its principle radar station at Yontan Mountain Radar, call sign "Walter Control". The 305th FCS provided invasion force protection and fighter/bomber control until the formal surrender of Japan on 2 September 1945. Following the surrender of Japan the 305th FCS was reassigned to 301st Fighter Wing, Eighth Air Force and remained at Camp Bishigawa, Okinawa. Detachment 1 305th FCS was discontinued about January 1946 and relocated to Camp Bishigawa, when Ie Shima was closed before the end of 1945. A new Detachment 1 was located at Hedo Misake, Okinawa and a smaller radar was set up to cover a narrow blind stop caused by mountains to the north. By June 1946, this site called "Point Tare", callsign "Moonshine Radar", was operational. The Point Tare site gave the squadron two operational radar sites.

=== Post-war ===
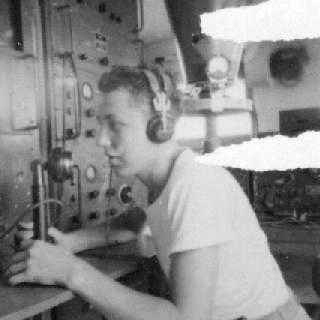
An airman of the 623rd AC&WS operates at Point Tare, 1947

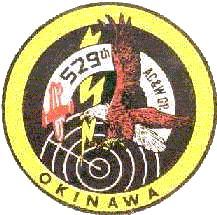
Emblem of the 529th AC&W Gp 1950s

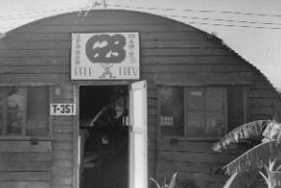
623rd AC&WS Able Crew Quarters, Camp Bishigawa, Okinawa 1940s

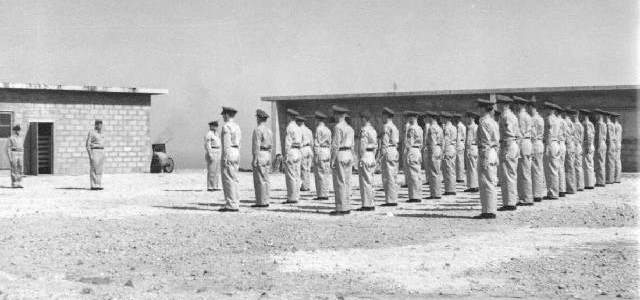
Troop Formation, Det 2 623rd AC&WS, Kume Air Station, Japan, 1950s

Re-designated the 623rd Aircraft Control and Warning (AC&W) Squadron on 2 July 1946, the squadron assumed air direction and control duties of the entire Ryuku Island chain of Japan. It remained in charge of the Okinawa Air Control Center and kept its detachment at Hedo Misake, Okinawa. On 12 October 1946, the 623rd AC&W Sq sent unit personnel to establish Detachment 2, a Direction Finding (DF) Station on Aguni Shima. By April 1947, the 623rd AC&W Sq had lost its flight control mission and was concentrating entirely upon air defense of the Ryuku Islands. Detachment 2 at Aguni Shima remained operational for only a short time, and was closed on 30 June 1947. As the United States Army Air Force transitioned to become the United States Air Force on 18 September 1947, so did the 623rd AC&W Sq, with no change in its Air Defense mission. On 1 November, the 623rd AC&W Sq was attached to the 3rd Operational Group (Provisional), subordinate to the 301st Fighter Wing. The new 529th Aircraft Control and Warning Group joined the 301st Fighter Wing officially on 15 April 1948, but without personnel or equipment. During May 1948, resources of the 623rd AC&W Sq were used to begin manning this group and the newly organized 624th Aircraft Control and Warning Squadron, which also had no personnel or equipment of its own. On 16 July 1948, the 623rd AC&W Sq had been formally assigned to the newly formed 529th Aircraft Control & Warning Group. Until about 12 August 1948, the 529th Group and the 624th AC&W Sq were little more than paper units, while the 623rd AC&W Sq was still fully manned. On 18 August 1948 the 529th AC&W Gp, with the 623rd AC&W Sq and the newly created 624th AC&W Sq was absorbed by the 51st Fighter Wing, when the 301st Fighter Wing was inactivated. Yontan Radar was designated as a Tactical Control Center during August 1948, and luckily so, on 3–4 October 1948, Okinawa was pounded by Typhoon Libby. Typhoon Libby severely damaged Detachment 1 623rd AC&W Sq, Point Tare, so much so that the early warning site was never re-opened. Detachment 1, 623rd AC&W Sq was placed in caretaker status and the men and equipment were relocated back to Camp Bishigawa. The same typhoon also badly damaged the Okinawan Air Control Center at Camp Bishigawa and Yontan Radar remained inoperable for the remainder of October 1948. Due to this damage, the 623rd AC&W Sq initiated planning for a new Air Defense Control Center at Kadena Air Base, a second Tactical Control Center and two new early warning sites. The Yontan Tactical Control Center functioned as the Air Defense Control Center during this transition. In January 1949, the Point Tare station was finally closed and the site abandoned, the land was returned to the Okinawan people. On 1 April 1949, the 529th AC&W Gp was reassigned from the 51st Fighter Wing directly to Thirteenth Air Force, taking with it the 623rd and 624th AC&W Squadrons. This reassignment was short lived though, as 13th Air Force was returned to Clark AB, Philippines in May 1949. On 16 May 1949, the 529th AC&W Gp with the 623rd and 624th AC&W Squadrons were reassigned directly to Twentieth Air Force, who assume the mission of the defense of the Ryukyu Islands and was reassigned to Kadena AB, Okinawa. The new Yaetake and Miyako Jima early warnings sites became operational on 15 Mar 1950 and were assigned to the 624th AC&W Sq, who reported to the 623rd AC&W Sq Air Defense Control Center at Yontan Mountain. The new Okinawa Air Defense Control Center at Stillwell Park, Kadena AB opened in June 1950, and was manned by the 623rd AC&W Sq. The 623rd AC&W Sq's Yontan Mountain site reverted to a Tactical Control Center.

=== Korean War ===
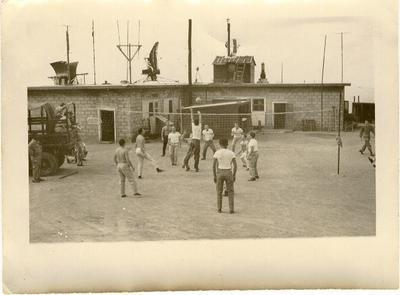
Mess hall & Operations Radars, Kume Air Station 1952

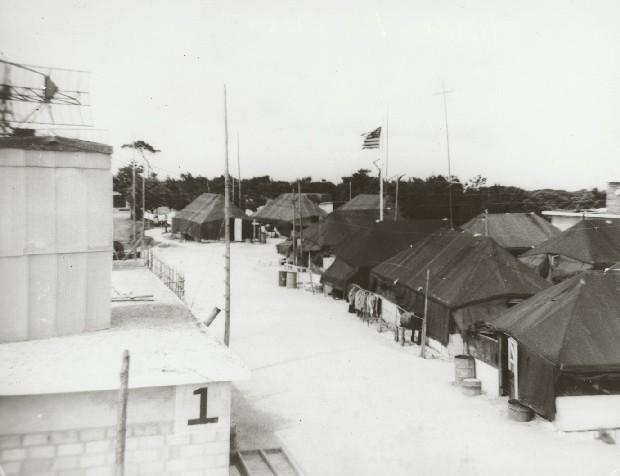
Radar and main camp tents, Okino Erabu Air Station 1953

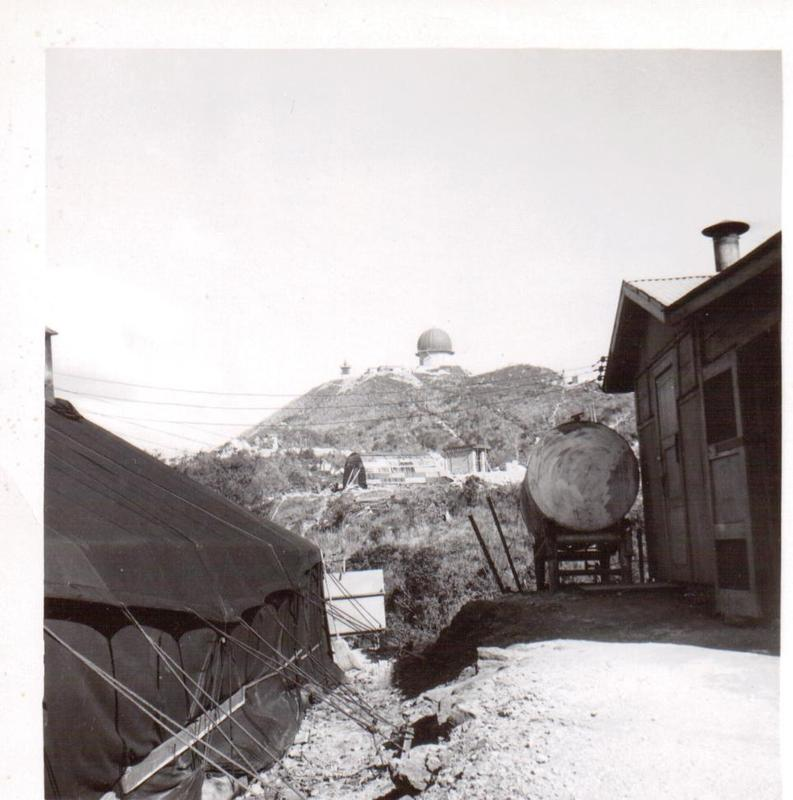
Yaetake Squad area, with radar in the distance, Okinawa 1950s

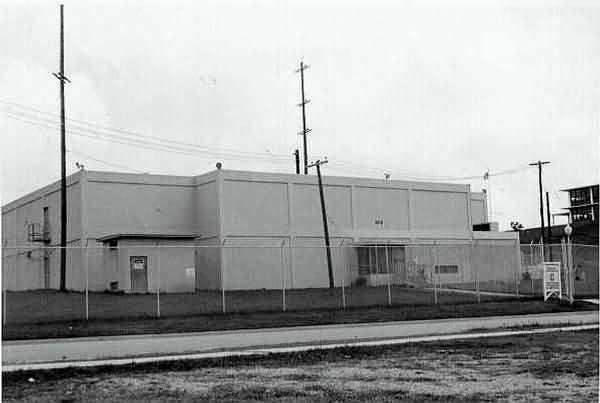
Naha ADCC at Naha AB, "The Blockhouse", 623rd AC&W Sq, 1960s

On 27 June 1950, the United Nations Security Council voted to assist the South Koreans in resisting the invasion of their nation by North Korea. At that time, the 22 B-29s of the 19th Bombardment Group stationed at Andersen Field on Guam were the only aircraft capable of hitting the Korean peninsula, and this unit was ordered to move to Kadena Air Base on Okinawa and begin attacks on North Korea. These raids began on 28 June 1950. In August 1950, the 307th Bombardment Group deployed from MacDill Air Force Base, Florida to Kadena AB, Okinawa. The 623rd AC&W Sq supported these bomber operations as they operated from Okinawa, en route to the Korean peninsula. By April 1951, there had been two additional early warning sites added to the 624th AC&W Sq, in order to better support defensive operations of the Ryuku Islands and bomber operations flowing northward against North Korea. The new EW sites became operational at Kume Shima and Okino-Erabu Jima, Japan, and were operated by 624th AC&W Sq. These new EW sights also reported to the 623rd AC&W Sq, Stilwell Park ADCC at Kadena AB. On 21 May 1951 the 529th Group operations section assumed operational control of the ADCC at Kadena AB, leaving the 623rd AC&WS responsible for the ADCC's administration, supply and maintenance. On 26 August 1951, the 851st AC&W Sq was activated and assumed operational responsibility for the Air Defense control Center from the 623rd AC&W Sq. This new squadron had to be manned solely from 623rd AC&WS resources. Effective 3 September 1951, the 623rd AC&W Sq delegated operation of the Yontan Radar to its newly created Detachment 1. The 623rd AC&W Sq assumed responsibility from the 624th AC&W Sq for operation of the Yaetake EW station, delegating it as Detachment 2. By the end of 1951, the 623rd AC&W Sq was awarded the Korean Service Streamer for its support to the 19th Bombardment Wing and the 307th Bombardment Group (Medium), both of which operated from Kadena AB and were participating in daily combat in Korea. The 529th AC&W Gp with the 851st AC&W Sq, completed a relocation from Camp Bishigawa to Naha AB on 1 Aug 1952. The YaeTake Station was closed on 27 April 1953 and all personnel were moved out by 2 May to allow for construction of a new radar facility in a rather limited space location. The 529th AC&W Group transferred under the control of the 6351st Air Base Wing on 1 July 1952. The fighting on the Korean peninsula ended on 27 July 1953, when an armistice was signed. While the 623rd no longer provided inbound routing for bombers to flow into the Korean Theater, it still kept a watchful eye to the north. Detachment 2 623rd AC&WS commenced operations of the Yae Take station on 13 June 1954. The 529th AC&W Group became part of the 51st Fighter-Interceptor Wing on 1 August 1954.

Korean Service Streamer Awarded to the 623rd AC&W Sq, 1951

=== Cold War ===
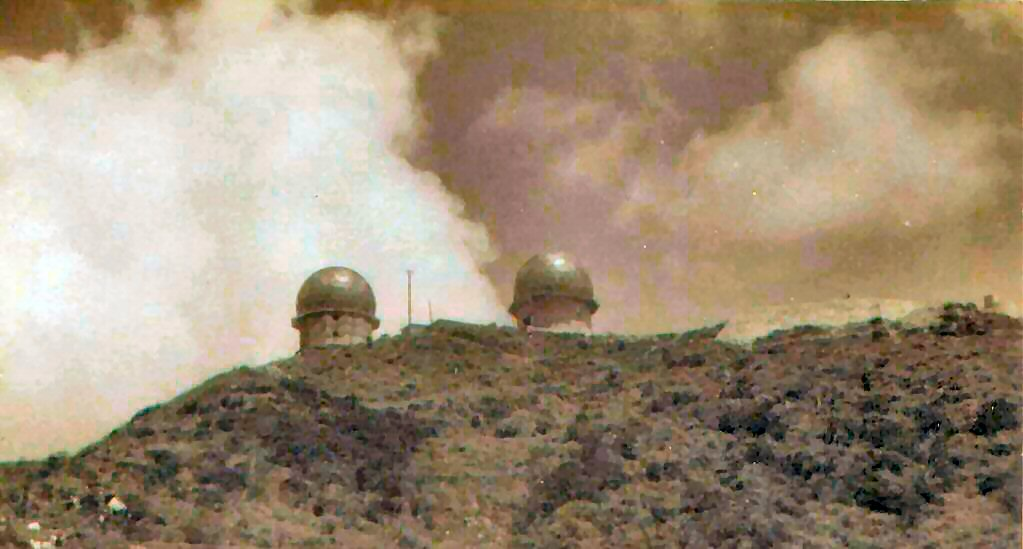
Miyako AS Radomes, Det 1 623rd AC&W Sq, 1957

Kume AS Radomes atop Habu Hill, Det 2 623rd AC&W Sq, 1960s

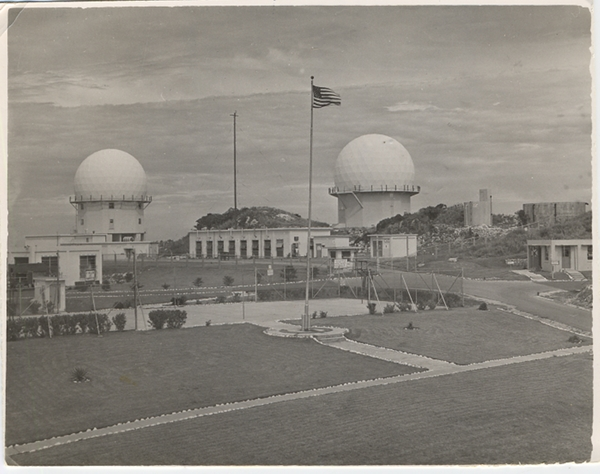
Yozadake AS Radomes, Det 3 623rd AC&W Sq, 1964

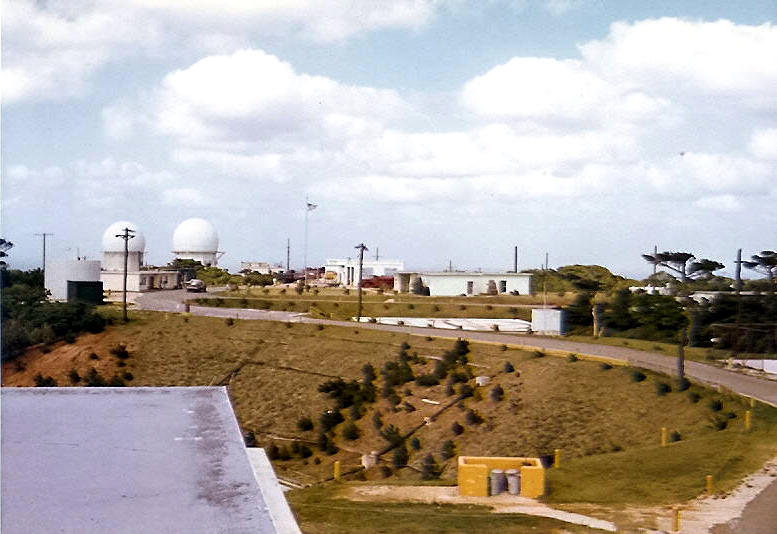
Okino Erabu AS Radomes, Det 4 623rd AC&W Sq, 1960s

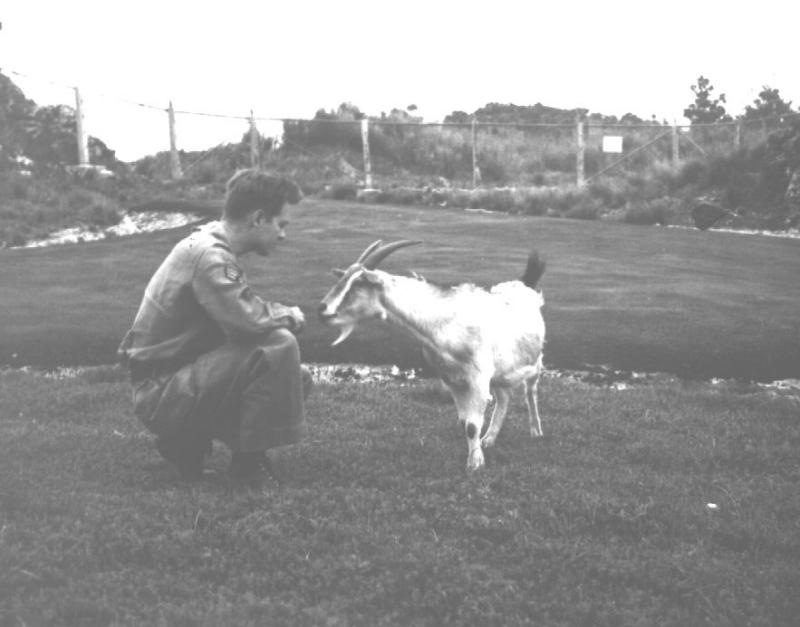
Det 3 "Okinawa Alps" goat mascot, Yozadake AS 1964

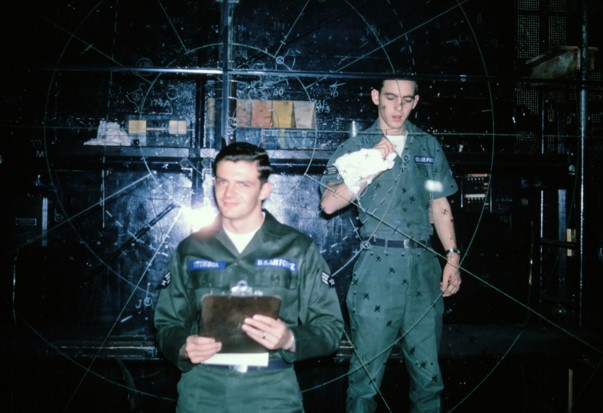
623rd Det 3 SGTs Mullinax & Stokosa work the plotting board, Yozadake AS, 1966

Detachments of the 623rd Aircraft Control & Warning Squadron 1958-1973
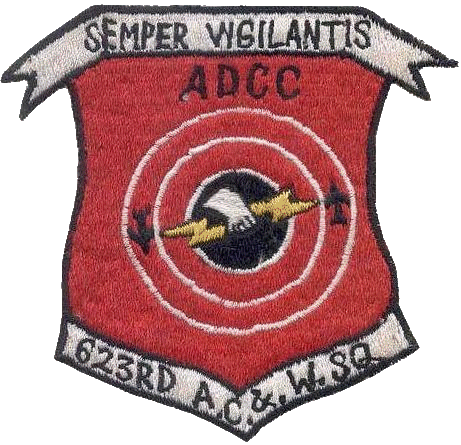
Air Defense Control Center - Naha, 623rd AC&W Sq

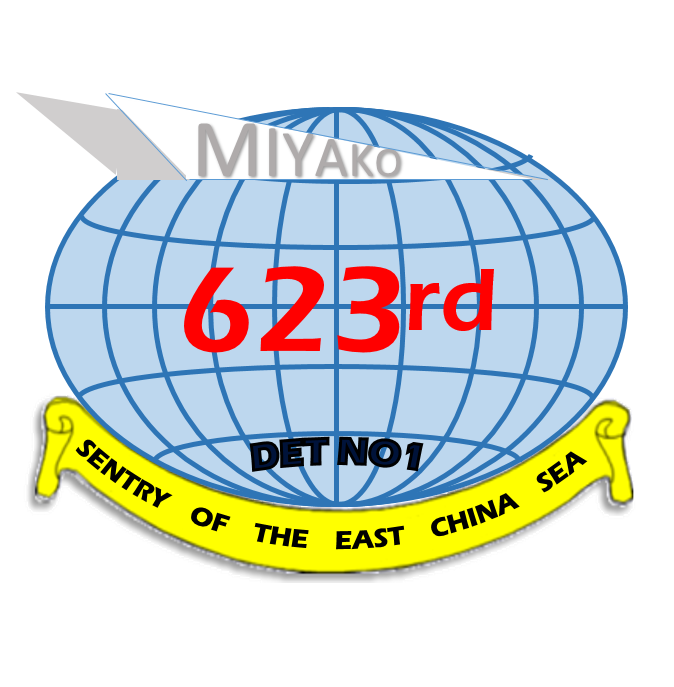
Detachment 1, 623rd AC&W Sq - Miyako Air Station

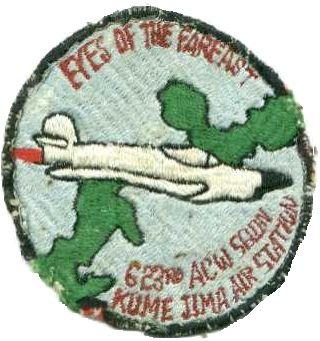
Detachment 2, 623rd AC&W Sq - Kume Air Station

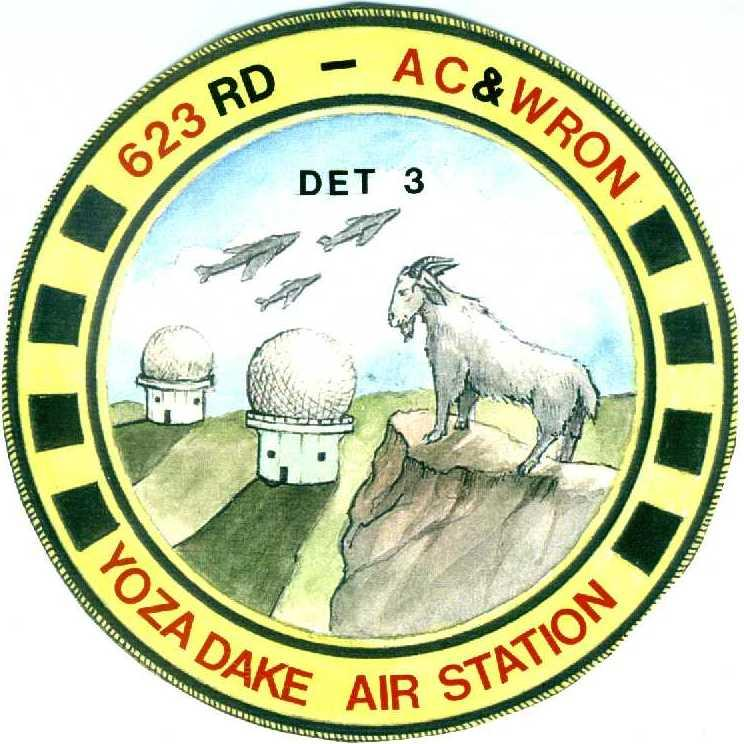
Detachment 3, 623rd AC&W Sq - Yozadake Air Station

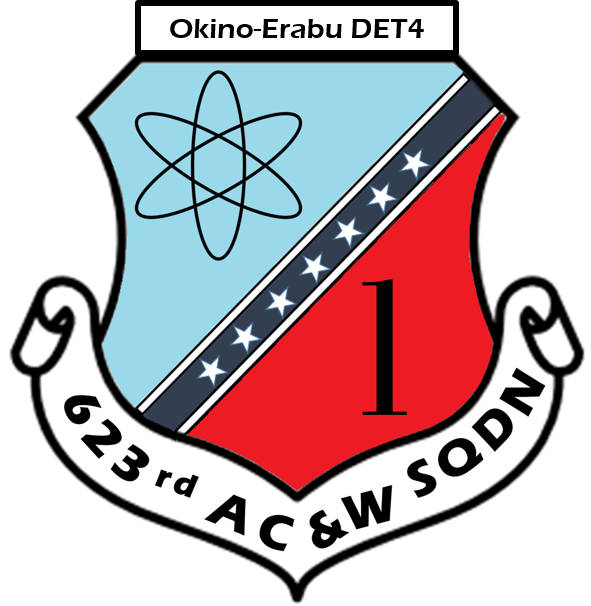
Detachment 4, 623rd AC&W Sq - Okino-Erabu Air Station

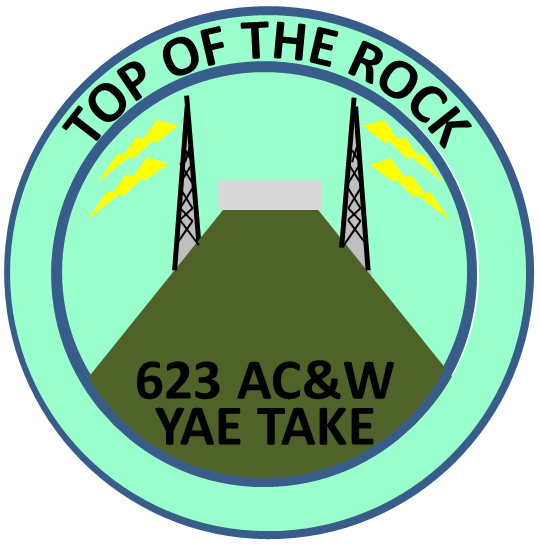
Detachment 5, 623rd AC&W Sq - Yaetake

Following the end of the Korean War, Detachment 1, 20th AF was created and assumed operational control of the 529th AC&W Gp on 16 Aug 1954. On 1 Mar 1955, the 313th Air Division assumed command from Twentieth Air Force. During this change the Operations Division of the 313th Air Division assumed operational control of the air defense of the Ryukus Islands, and the operations of the ADCC from 20th AF Det 1, which was inactivated. In early 1955 a new radar site. located at Yoza Dake was under construction as a replacement for the Yontan Mountain site, which was to be closed when the new station became operational. The 529th AC&W Gp, was relieved of operational control of air defenses, and was inactivated on 15 Mar 1955. The personnel from the 851st AC&W Sq, which had operated the ADCC were assigned to the newly formed Detachment 1, 313th Air Division and the 851st was inactivated. The 623rd AC&W and 624th AC&W Sqs were reassigned directly to the 313th Air Division at this time. Shortly after 313th Air Division assumed responsibilities of air defense, the 623rd AC&W Sq added the new Air Defense Direction Center (ADCC) at Yoza Dake Air Station, which became operational 24 May 1956. The Yoza Dake ADDC assumed responsibility for all of the operations in the Southern Zone of the Ryuku Islands with the 623rd AC&W Sq's Yaetake sight becoming the ADCC of the 624th AC&W Sq, with the responsibility of directing Northern Zone operations. Following the activation the 623rd AC&W Sq new site at Yoza Dake, the Yontan GCI site was closed down. With the Yontan closure, the Yaetake station, absorb some of the men and responsibilities of the Yontan site. With the new north–south realignment, the AC&W Sq's Detachments were also reorganized on 31 Jul 1956. The 623rd AC&W Sq assumed operations of the 624th AC&W Sq Detachment 1, Miyako EW Station, and it became the new Detachment 1, 623rd AC&W Sq. The 624th AC&W Sq Detachment 2, Kume EW Station, became the new Detachment 2 of the 623rd AC&W Sq. On 13 Aug 1956 the 623rd AC&W Sq Headquarters officially relocated to Yoza Dake Air Station. The north–south alignment functioned for a year before the 313th Air Division Detachment 1 decided to reorganized the defensive structure to streamline operations. The separate Northern and Southern Sectors of Air Defense operations were eliminated and combined into one Air Defense Identification Zone for the entirety of the Ryukus Islands. This merger reduced the ADCC function at Yae Take to that of an Alternate ADCC, with the Yoza Dake ADCC becoming primary for the 313th Air Division. By 8 March 1958 the 624th AC&W Sq was inactivated and the 623rd AC&W Sq was wholly reorganized. The 623rd AC&W Sq Headquarters relocated from Yozadake Air Station to Naha Air Base. 623rd AC&W Sqs Detachments 1 and 2 remained unchanged, Yozadake was reorganized as Detachment 3, Okino-Erabu and Yae Take where assumed from the inactivation of 624th AC&W Sq and became 623rd AC&W Sq's Detachment 4 and 5 respectively. By 27 Mar 1958 the 51st Fighter-Interceptor Wing, at Naha AB, once again assumed operational control of the Air Defense of the Ryukus Islands, this time from the 313th Air Division. The 51st FIW Combat Operations Division assumed control from the Operations Division of the 313th Air Division. In late 1958 Detachment 5, Yae Take was virtually discontinued, its radar dismantled, the station became a communications relay site. During August 1960 the Yae Take communications site was transferred to the 30th Air Defense Artillery Brigade and renamed site 18. The USAF maintains a communications site at the station. With this action, the 623rd AC&WS began a long period of relative stability with respect to its assignment, its components and its operations. From August 1960 to August 1967 the squadron's facilities underwent gradual improvement in order to withstand many of the Okinawan typhoons which had plagued its radar sites since the squadron first arrived at the island. The 623rd AC&W deployed to South Korea during January 1968 in support of Operation Combat Fox, the United States response to the USS Pueblo Incident.

=== Japanese reversion ===
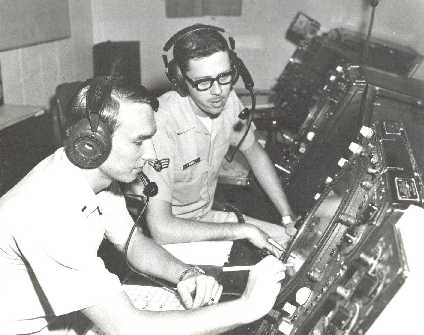
Miyako AS, "Scope Dopes", 1968

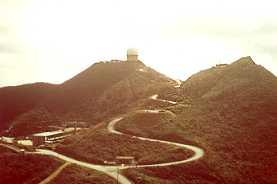
Yaetake AS Radome, Okinawa 1966

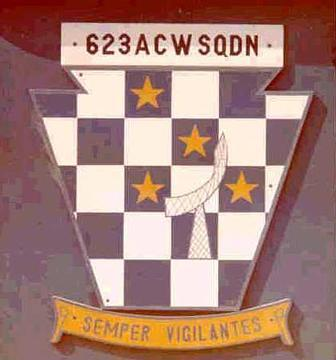
623rd AC&W Sq Unit emblem, 1969

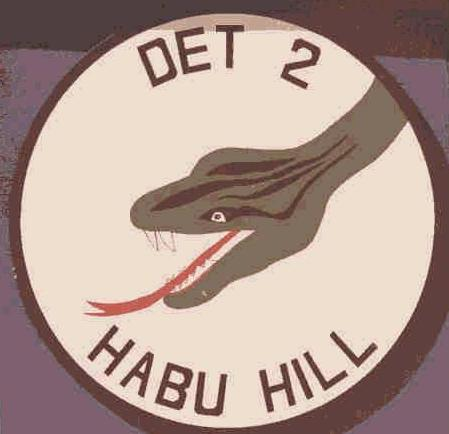
Sign displayed by Det 2 Kume AS, known as "Habu Hill"

In 1969, Japan's Prime Minister Eisaku Sato and President Richard Nixon agreed to the reversion of the Ryuku Islands to Japanese control. On 27 March 1971 the 18th Tactical Fighter Wing at Kadena AB assumed responsibility for the air defense of Okinawa preparatory to the inactivation of the 51st Fighter-Interceptor Wing.. When the 51st was inactivated on 31 May 1971 the 623rd AC&WS was reassigned to the 18th Wing. The Okinawa Reversion Agreement document was signed simultaneously in Washington D.C. and Tokyo on 17 June 1971. After the announcement of this agreement, the 623rd AC&W Sq started planning for turning over the entire defensive structure (C2 structure/radar/facilities) of the Ryuku Islands to the JASDF. Personnel of the Japan Air Self Defense Force had, in fact, began orientation visits to the 623rd's facilities in mid-1971 to discuss plans. More visits followed, and on 12 November 1971 and a plan for the transfer of radar facilities to JASDF was signed by USAF and JASDF authorizes. A team of 35 JASDF officers visited the sites again during December 1971. On 15 May 1972 the control of the Ryuku Islands was given back to Japanese control and the United States Civil Administration of the Ryuku Islands was abolished. This is when the real work of the 623rd AC&W Sq began. JASDF Air Defense Operations Teams (ADOTs) destined for each radar site arrived at Yoza Dake on 5 September 1972 for special orientation and familiarization before continuing onto their respective Air Stations. The ADOTs then went to their respective Air Stations to start on-the-job training with their USAF counterparts. All of the initial JASDF personnel were at their sites by 6 October 1972. The first site was to be turned over on 31 Dec 1972. On this date Okino Erabu Air Station was turned over to the JASDF and 623rd AC&W Sq Detachment 4 was discontinued. Detachment 1 623rd AC&W Sq at Miyako Jima was discontinued with the JASDF assuming control of that Air Station and defense operations on 15 Feb 1973. The JASDF took over Yoza Dake Air Station operations from Detachment 3 623rd AC&W Sq on 1 Mar 1973, assuming responsibility for detection and identification of the entire Ryuku chain. Detachment 3 was discontinued on 31 Mar 1973. Detachment 2 623rd AC&W Sq Kume Air Station was discontinued on 15 May 1973. The final piece of the defense structure, the 623rd AC&W Sq's ADCC at Naha Air Base was transferred to the JASDF on 31 Jun 1973. Eight short days later, the 623rd Aircraft Control and Warning Squadron was inactivated on 8 July 1973.

Vietnamese Gallantry Cross with Palm

Reversion of 623rdAC&W Sq sites to JASDF Control
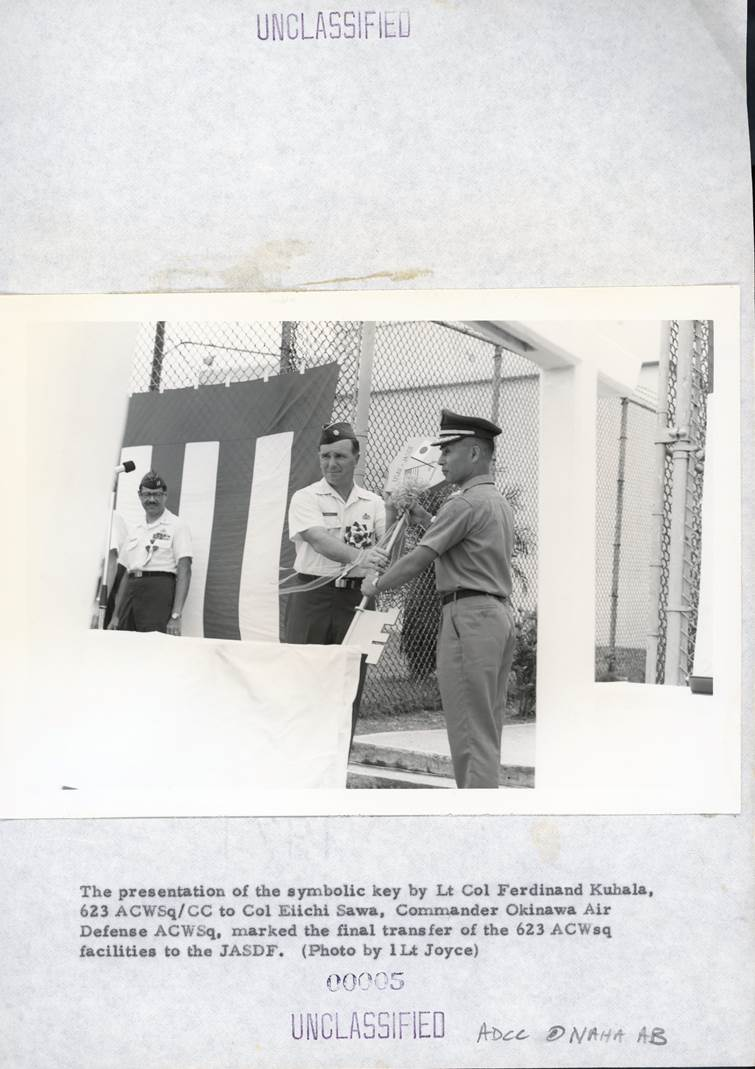
623rd AC&W Sq Naha ADCC Reversion Ceremony

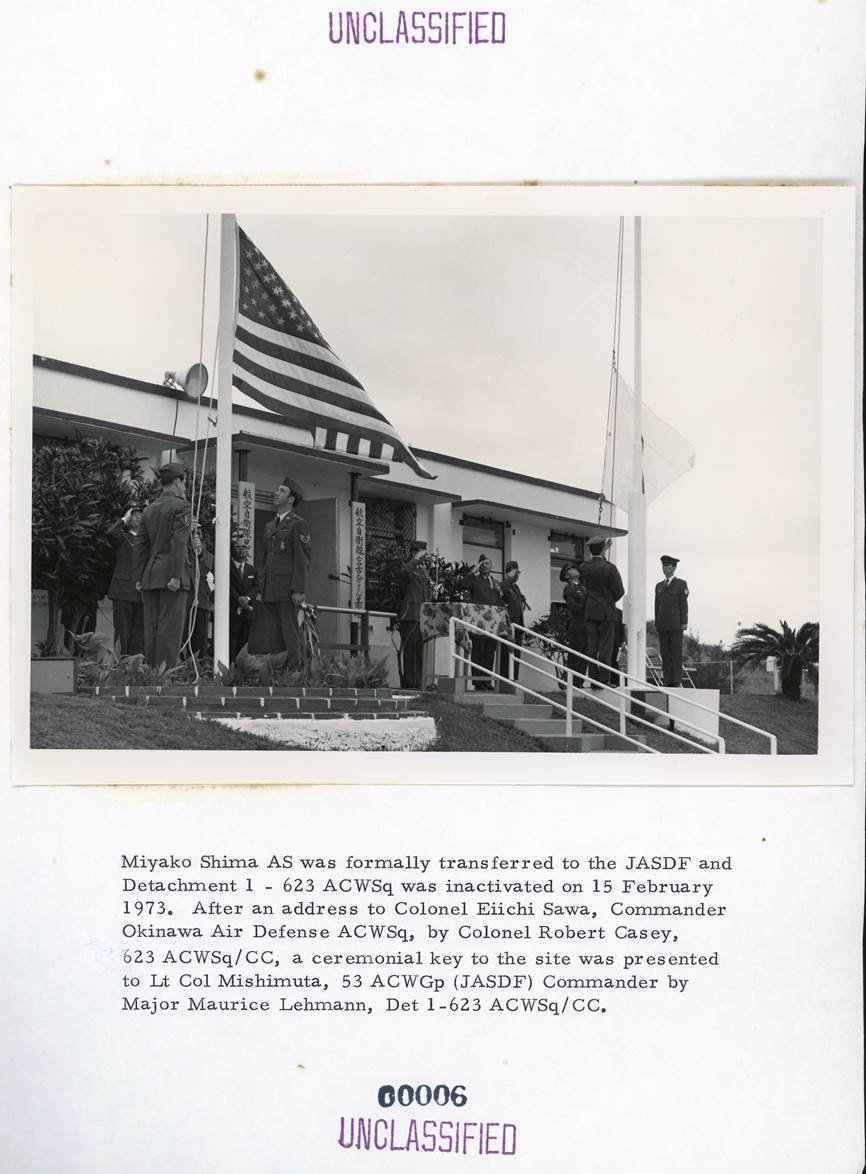
623rd AC&W Sq, Det 1 Reversion Ceremony 15 Feb 1973

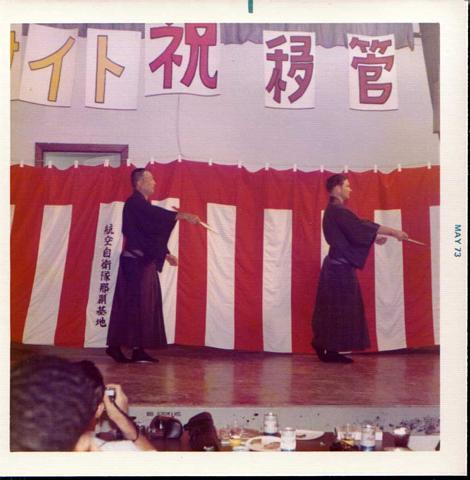
623rd AC&W Sq, Det 2, Reversion Ceremony 15 May 1973

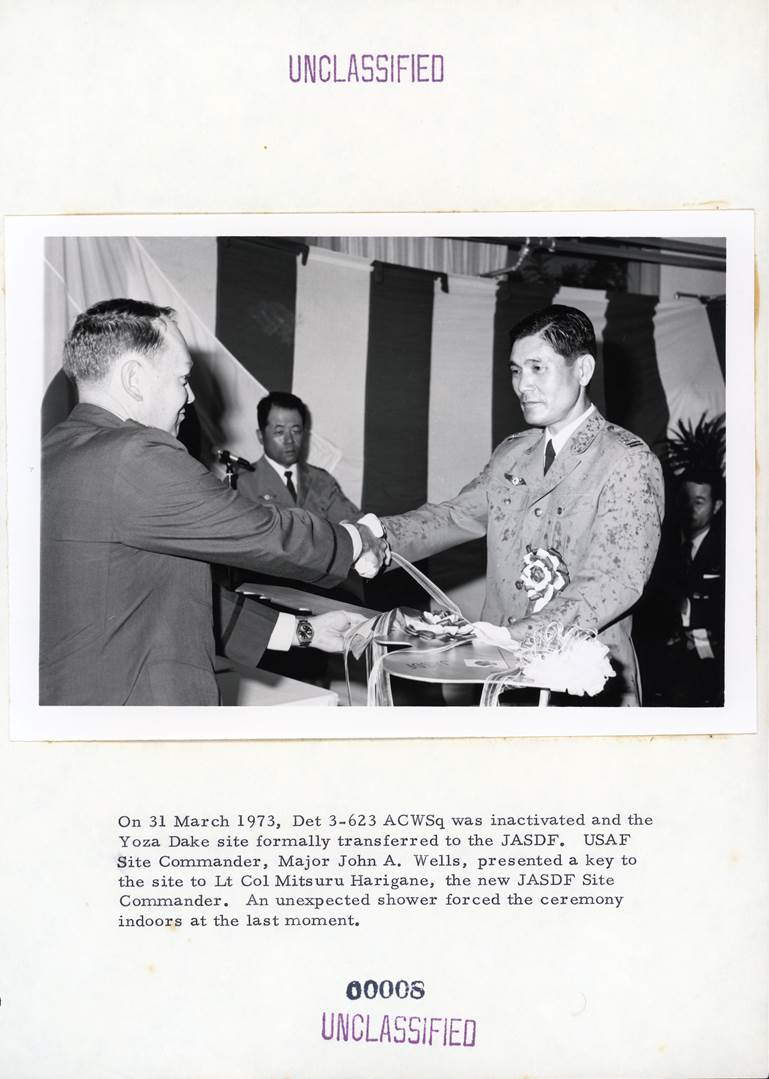
623rd AC&W Sq, Det 3 Reversion Ceremony 31 March 1973

=== Reactivation ===
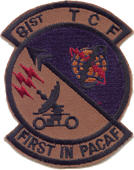
81st TCF, a subordinate unit to 623rd TCS Apr 1983-Feb 1987

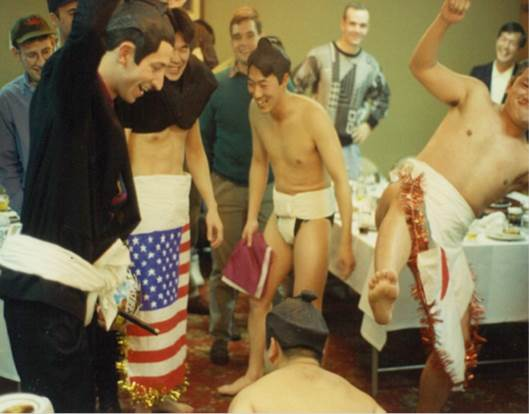
623rd TCS & JASDF airmen participate in a social event, 1983

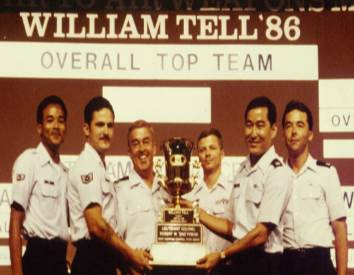
(623rd TCS) Members take the Top Control Team Trophy, William Tell 1986

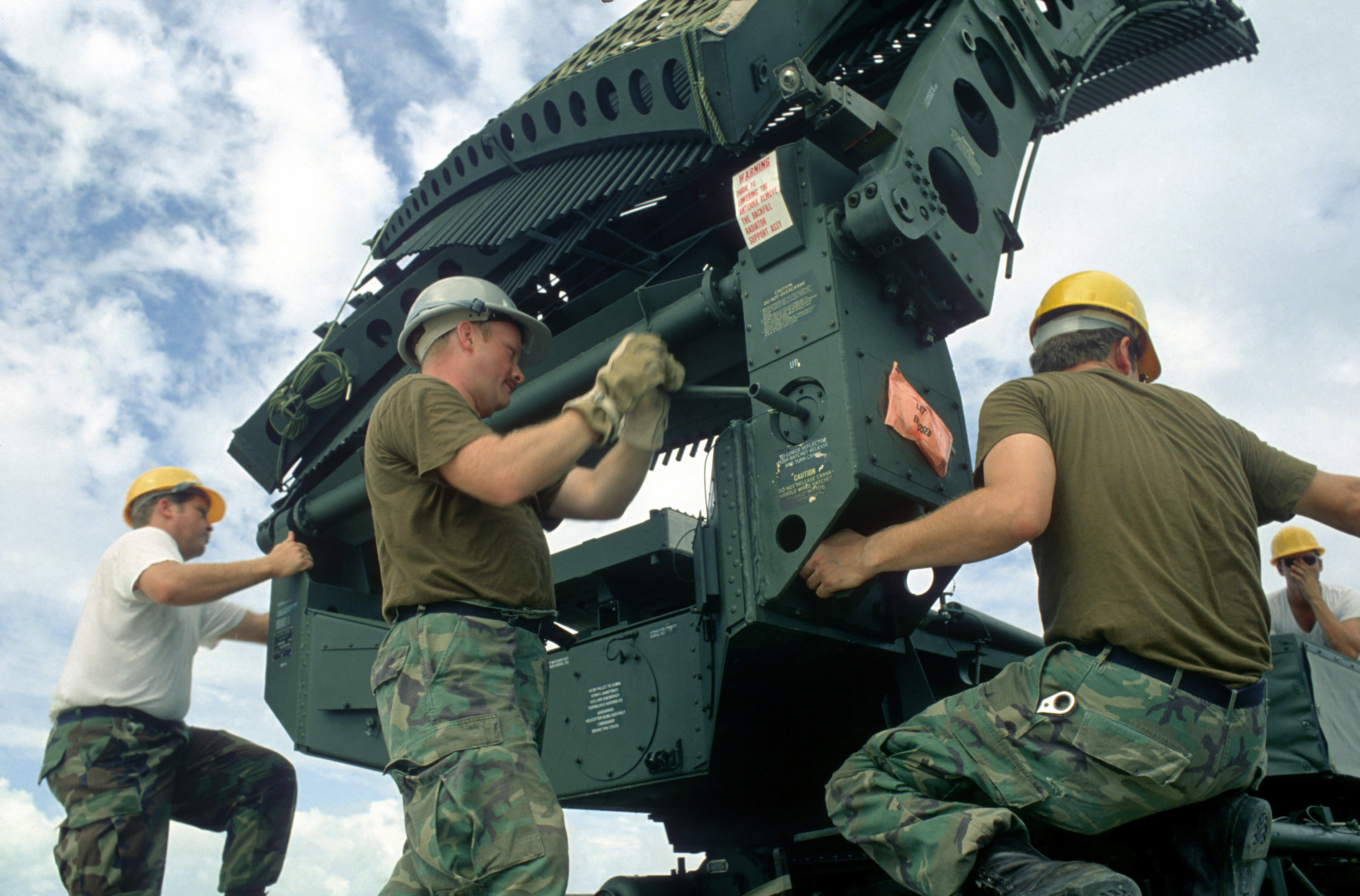
81st TCF (623rd TCS), Kadena AB, Japan, erect an AN-TPS-43E radar

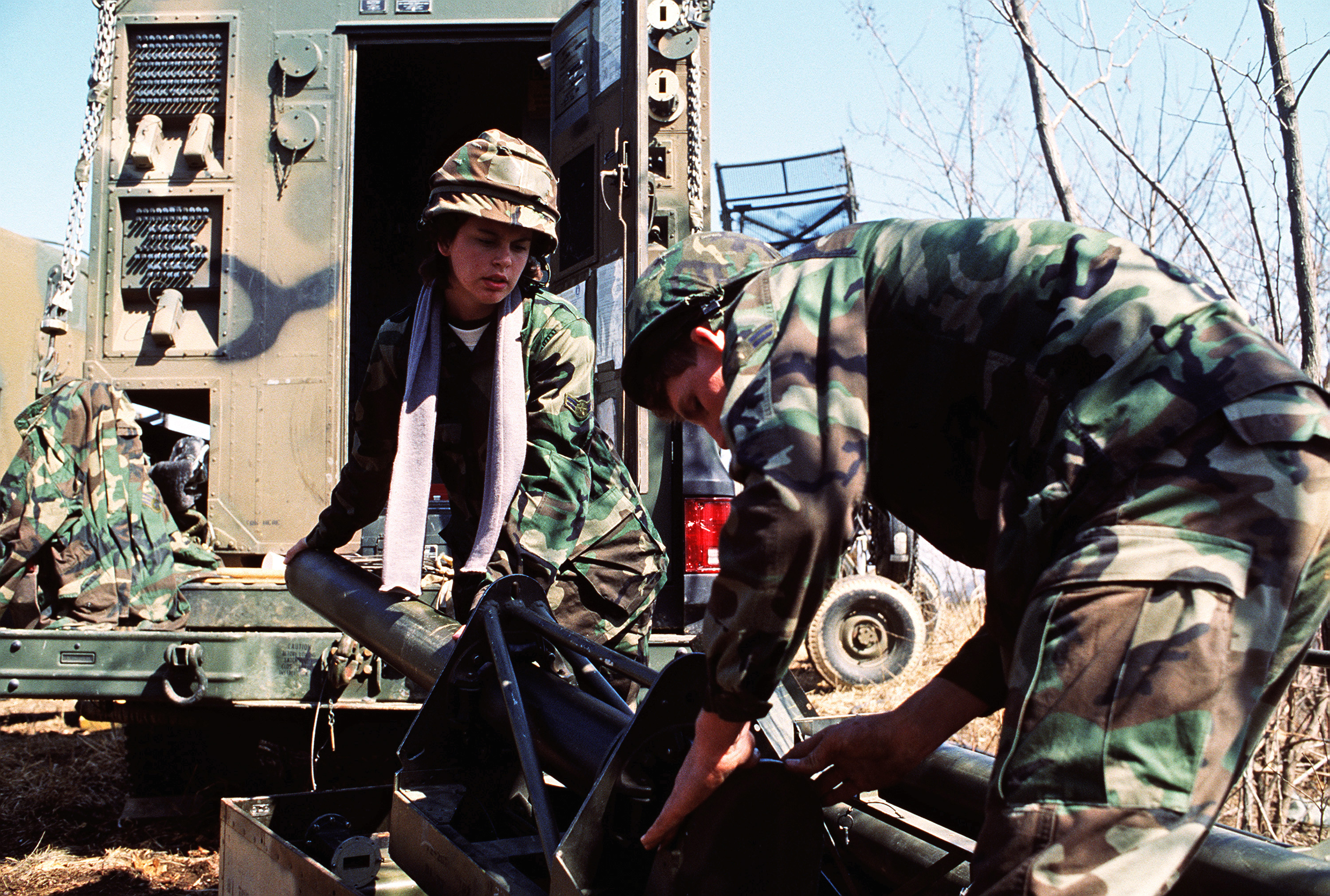
Amn of the 81st TCF assemble an antenna during TEAM SPIRIT 1986

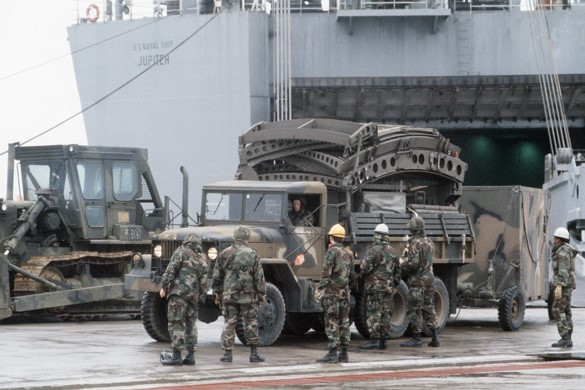
81st TCF (623rd TCS) unload equipment from USNS JUPITER 1985

The unit was reactivated on 1 April 1983, as the 623rd Tactical Control Squadron, with the mission of providing an operationally ready Forward Air Control Post (81st Tactical Control Flight) for worldwide employment, Ground Control Intercept (GCI) support for local training requirements, and Theater Control Operations Team (TCOT) personnel for GCI support and USAF integration within the Japanese Air Defense System (JADS). The new 623rd TCS was assigned to the 5th Tactical Control Group out of Osan AB, South Korea. The newly formed 623rd Tactical Control Squadron was reconstituted with a main unit and three subordinate and geographically separated operating locations; OLAA, OLAB and OLAC. The main unit, located at Kadena AB, was composed of the command section, operations, orderly room and the 81st Tactical Control Flight. The Kadena location was tasked to support three F-15 squadrons assigned to the 18TFW and maintain the overall squadron training and stan/eval programs. Additionally the subordinate 81st TCF was responsible for worldwide employment of a forward radar element. OLAA was established as an Air Defense Liaison Element (ADLE) located at Fuchu Air Station near Tokyo, Japan. This ADLE provided 24-hour US Liaison between US Forces Japan and JASDF. OLAB was also an ADLE, and it was located at Naha AB in southern Okinawa. The Naha ADLE was also tasked to provide 24-hour US Liaison service to the JASDF within the Southwest Defense Sector of Japan. Each of these ADLE was composed of six to nine Control Technicians, one Officer in Charge and one NCOIC. OLAC provided a weapons control element at Misawa AB, Japan. They were tasked to provide three GCI teams for two squadrons of F-16s assigned to the 432 TFW. The unique nature of the new 623rd TCS (minus 81 TCF) was that it owned no equipment of its own, all of the C2 systems and radars were provided by the JASDF. Many of the provided systems were the very same systems that the 623rd AC&W Sq had operated prior to reversion in 1973. The 623rd controllers made a "clean sweep" of the control awards during the 1982 William Tell Competition. The 623rd deployed to northern Japan in September 1983 to assist in controlling airspace for aircraft searching for bodies from Korean Airlines Flight 007, shot down by the Soviet Union. That garnered a letter for the unit from the South Korean minister of national defense for their outstanding humanitarian effort. The 623rd controllers returned again to the 1984 William Tell Competition, taking the top control prize, the Lt Col William W. "Dad" Friend Trophy for top control team. The William Tell dominance by the 623rd continued at the 1986 edition of the Air-to-Air meet. The 5th TACG team won the top control prize, the Lt Col William W. "Dad" Friend Trophy, marking a third trophy for the 623rd. The 623rd members provided 4 of 6 team members, led by team chief, Captain Neal Kumasaka 623rd TCS. In February 1987, the 623rd TCS was reorganized and the 81st TCF became a separate organization, the 81st TCS. The 623rd TCS was assigned directly under Fifth Air Force, 17 February 1987, while the 81st TCS was reassigned to the 5th Tactical Control Group and redesignated as the 81st Tactical Control Squadron. The 623rd TCS was realigned under the newly activated 18th Operations Group, 18th Wing, 1 October 1991. The unit underwent another name change and mission reorganization in April 1992. The 623rd TCS became the 623d Air Control Squadron with two detachments, Det 1 at Fuchu Air Base, Japan operating an Air Defense Liaison Element, and Det 2 at Misawa Air Base, Japan operating a single Tactical Control Operations Team. The Naha AB forward operating location Air Defense Liaison Element was merged into the Kadena AB main Squadron location. The Kadena location provided the Command element, Standardization and Evaluation and Trainings Sections along with providing two Tactical Control Operations Teams that executed out of Yozadake Subbase (JASDF), Okinawa. On 1 August 1994 the 623rd Air Control Squadron's two detachments became separate flights under the USAF's objective wing reorganization "one base, one wing, one boss" initiative. Consequently, the 623d Air Control Squadron at Kadena Air Base was re-designated the 623d Air Control Flight, Detachment 1 at Fuchu Air Base became the 624th Air Control Flight, while Detachment 2 at Misawa Air Base became the 610th Air Control Flight. The 623d ACF's mission was to provide rapid response, combat ready tactical control operations teams, integrated battle staff, weapons control and command and control liaison elements in support of US and bilateral interests throughout the entire PACOM theater. The 623d ACF has participated in every biennial Exercise KEEN SWORD, designed to increase combat readiness and interoperability of U.S. forces and the Japan Self-Defense Force, since the flight's reorganization in 1994. The 623d ACF operated out of two JASDF facilities, Naha Air Base's Direction Center and Yozadake Sub Base. The 623d last controlled out of the Yozadake Sub Base in 2010, prior to the JASDF shutting down the JADGE Operations Facility for construction of a new radar and operations system, the AN/FPS-5 Gamera. On 14 March 2011 members of Lightsword deployed to Iruma Air Base (JASDF), Honshu, Japan to assist in the command and control of US relief efforts for Operation Tomodachi, the disaster relief effort following the 2011 Tōhoku earthquake and tsunami.

=== The Pacific Pivot ===
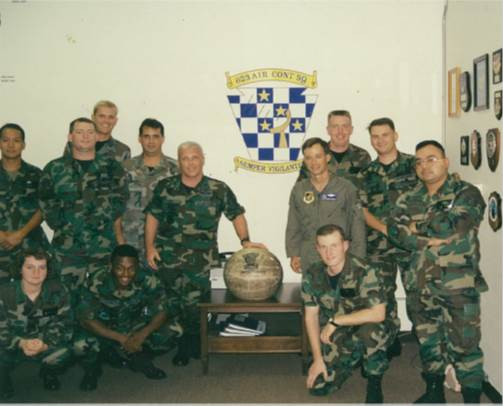
Al Yamamah Ball with the 623rd ACS Commander, Lt Col Eide, 1995

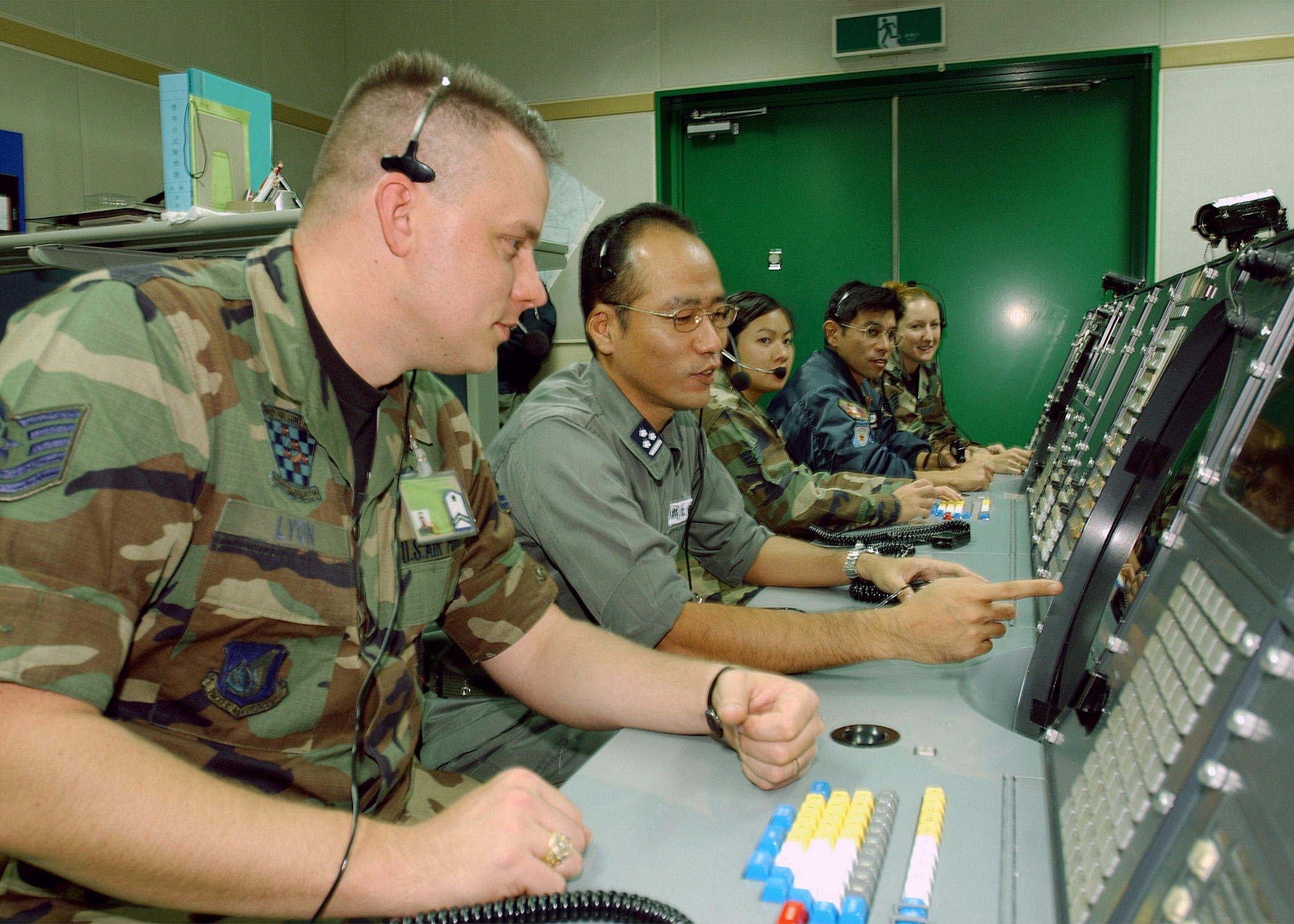
TSGT Lyon, 623 ACF (left), performs liaison duties with JASDF CAPT Ohta (center), at Exercise COPE NORTH 02–1, Yozadake AS, Okinawa, Japan, 2001

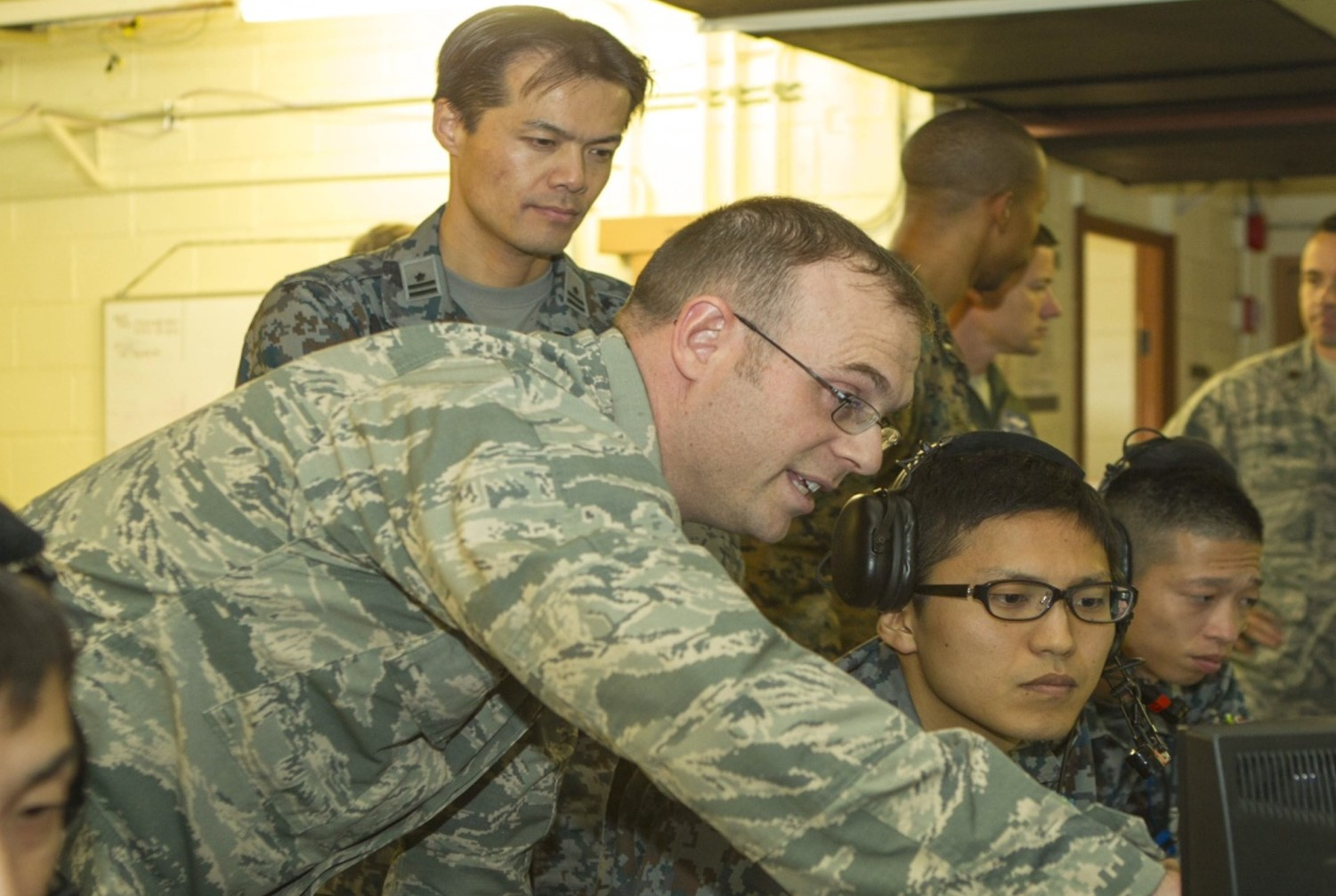
CAPT John Auld, 623d ACF, instructs JASDF LT "Bill" Mouri, during a joint/bilateral training event, Kadena AB, 5 Feb 2014

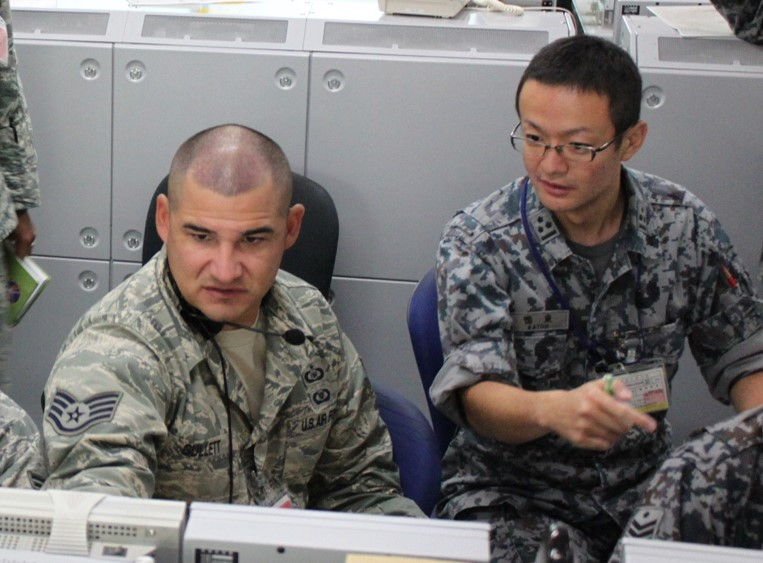
SSGT Robert Gullett conducts liaison duties with JASDF CAPT Katoh, Kasuga AB, 24 August 2015

Unveiled in 2011, the "Pacific Pivot" aimed to transition US Military resources away from the Middle East and towards the world's most populous and economically diverse area. This increase in military presence in the Pacific drove a review of the Command and Control structure of the US Air Force in Japan. The existing C2 structure had atrophied down to two flights, the 623D ACF, Kadena AB and 610th ACF, Misawa AB, and an element, 5AF ADLE, Yokota AB, to conduct coordinated air operations during contingency operations and support bilateral exercises and/or daily flying operations during peacetime. During this review there was an identified gap in tactical communications that could only be filled by an Interface Control Cell, to fuse common tactical pictures into on Common Operational Picture. The biggest limiting factor identified was within the Southwest Sector of Japan. This Sector was considered the strategic hub or "keystone of the Pacific" for the US Military. The 623D ACF was identified to stand-up and conduct operations of the Southwest Sector Interface Control Cell. This drove an increase in funding, personnel and facilities for the 623D. Additionally, identified in the review was the lack of an Air Defense Artillery Fire Control (ADAFCO), which is required in order to direct US air and air defense artillery employment. The ADAFCO is required in order to effectively coordinate with US and JASDF surface to air missile systems. In 2016 the 623d's first full-time assigned ADAFCO arrived, CAPT Owen Sill, 94th Army Air and Missile Defense Command. The mission increase and personnel influx required a greater support structure to adequately operate and command it. This drove the 623D Air Control Flight to be reorganized and the 623D Air Control Squadron was activated on 15 Apr 2016.

Redesignation Ceremony 623d ACF to 623D ACS, Kadena AB, 15 April 2016
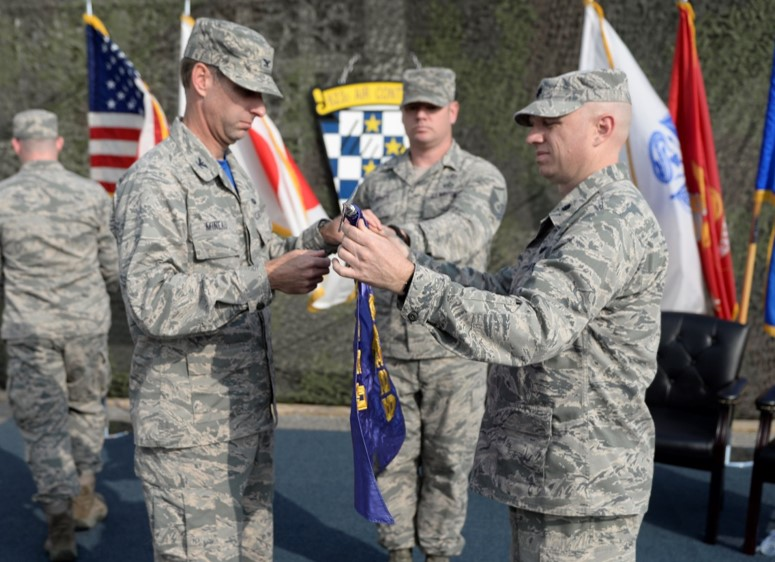
Col Mineau, 18 OG/CC and Lt Col Biehl, 623 ACS/CC unfurl the new ACS guidon

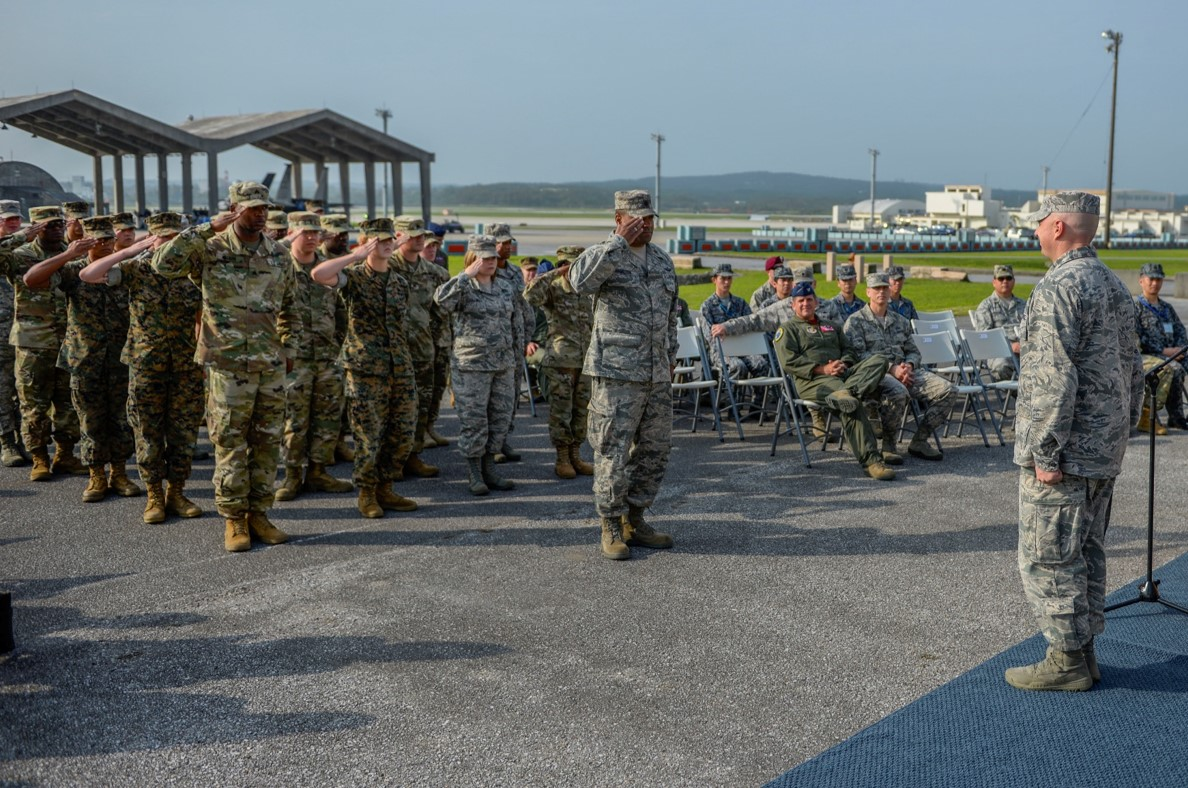
623D ACS members present first salute as a squadron to commander Lt Col Biehl

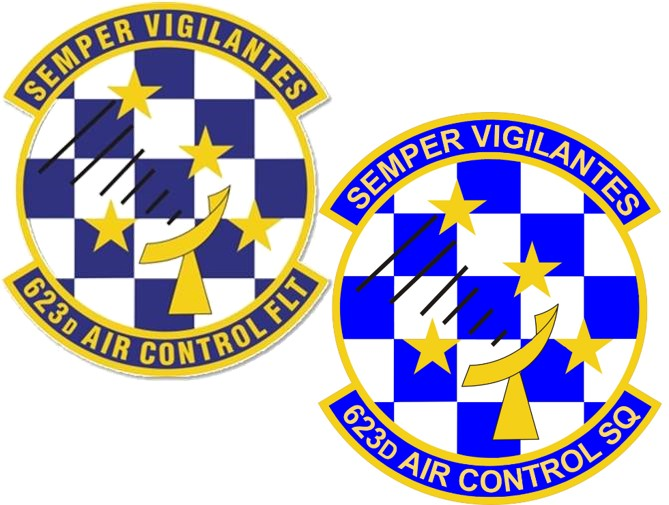
623d Air Control Flight change of emblem to 623D Air Control Squadron

The newly reorganized 623D Air Control Squadron was tasked with a two-fold mission of (1) to provide rapidly deployable Joint Theater Operations Control Teams (TCOT) to provide host nation liaison and coordinate and direct US air and air defense artillery employment within a sector of the Japan Air Defense Ground Environment system and to (2) Operate Japan's Joint/Bilateral Southwest Sector Interface Control Cell (SICC), to fuse joint and multinational data provided by regional C2 units, track producers, and tactical data link (TDL) participants to execute Integrated Air & Missile Defense (IAMD) and Ballistic Missile Defense (BMD) operations in support of the Defense of Japan. The SICC is responsible for daily coordination and operations with 5AF, USFJ, PACAF, III MEF, 7th Fleet, 94th AAMDC and Japanese Self Defense Forces.

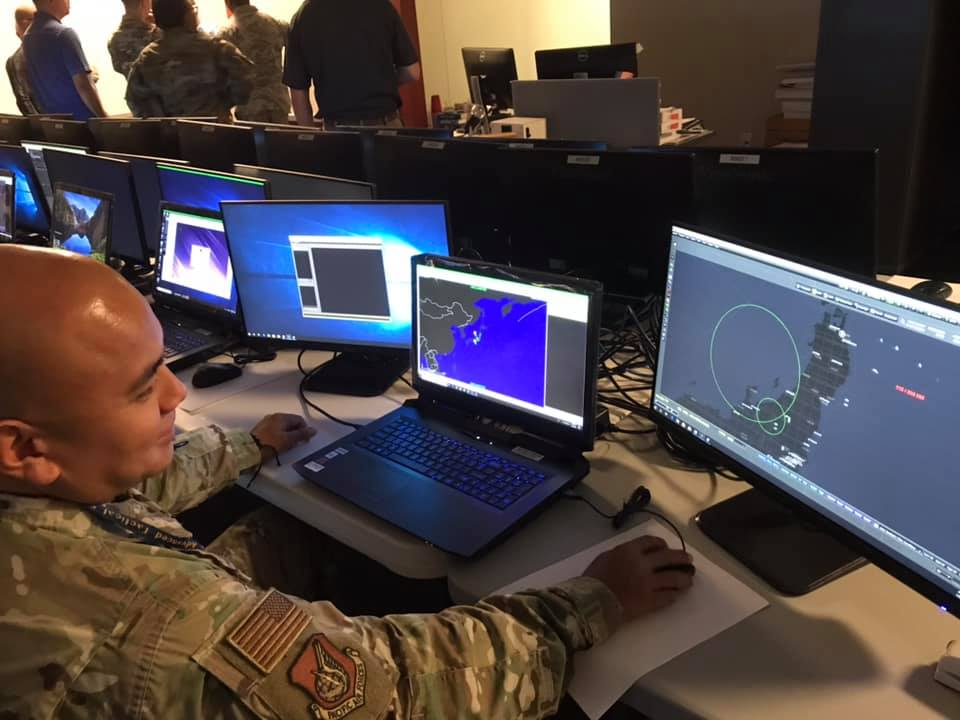
MSGT Bamboo Garcia, 623 ACS Superintendent, performing first system checkout on new TORCC system, 23 January 2019

In January 2019, PACAF procured and delivered a new C2 system, called the Theater Operationally Resilient Command and Control (TORCC). The TORCC system is a data fusion engine combining Tactical Display Framework (TDF), Battlespace Command and Control Center (BC3), and a virtual Air Defense Systems Integrator (ADSI). This C2 system improves the 623 ACS speed, light, and its ability to support different mission types including Multi-Domain Command and Control, Humanitarian Assistance and Disaster Response, contingencies. The system will enable deployed operations and allow tactical datalink and sensor information to be ingested and fused.

Awards won by unit members include three time William Tell, Lt Col William W. "Dad" Friend Trophy, 1982, 1984 and 1986. PACAF's first-ever Command and Control Warrior of the Year award in 1996, PACAF Enlisted Weapons Director of the Year in 1997, PACAF Command and Control Battle Management Operator of the Year - Airmen Category 2012, Headquarters' Air Force Command & Control Battle Management Operator of the Year - NCO Category 2013 (SSgt William Gulley), PACAF's Command and Control Battle Management Operator of the Year - Officer Category 2013 (Capt Shannon Greene), PACAF's C2 Crew of the Year 2014, PACAF's C2 Crew of the Year 2016 and Headquarters' Air Force Command & Control Battle Management Operator of the Year - Officer Category 2016 (Capt Alison Cruise). The 623d has earned two service streamers: The World War II Asia-Pacific Theater and the Korean Theater. Decorations include eleven Air Force Outstanding Unit Awards and the Republic of Vietnam Gallantry Cross with Palm.

The 623d ACS is currently assigned to the 18th Operations Group, Kadena AB and supports bilateral air operations through weapons control, battle staff, and liaison functions between the Japan Air Defense Command and the Commander, 5th Air Force. Based out of Kadena Air Base, the 623d remains ready to integrate USAF, joint, and bilateral combat aerospace operations and defend United States and Japanese mutual interests in the Pacific region. The 623d ACS maintains system expertise on an indigenous primary command and control system at Naha Air Base, Kasuga Air Base and Iruma Air Base. The TCOT may deploy to other sites within the PACOM AOR to provide host nation liaison and command and control.

== Emblem ==
=== Description/Blazon ===
On a disc chequy azure and argent, in base a radar antenna or fimbriated Sable emitting six sound waves in graduating size bendwise of the last, three mullets, two and one, above the antenna and one in dexter base all of the third; all within a narrow border yellow. Attached above the disk, a blue scroll edged with a narrow Yellow border and inscribed "SEMPER VIGILANTES" in Yellow letters. Attached below the disk, a blue scroll edged with a narrow yellow border and inscribed "623D AIR CONTROL SQ" in yellow letters.

=== Emblem significance ===
Ultramarine blue and Air Force yellow are the Air Force colors. Blue alludes to the sky, the primary theater of Air Force operations. Yellow refers to the sun and the excellence required of Air Force personnel. The checkered background is representative of the plotting boards peculiar to an Air Control and Warning units of the past. The radar antenna symbolizes the primary "weapon" of the unit, teaching and guiding aircraft with electronic waves. The stars represent the unit's four original detachments (Yozadake AS, Kume AS, Okino-Erabu AS and Miyako AS).

== Lineage ==
305th Fighter Control Squadron (USAAF)

- Constituted on 31 March 1943
- Activated on 1 April 1943

623rd Aircraft Control & Warning Squadron

- Redesignated on 2 July 1946
- Inactivated on 8 July 1973

623rd Airborne Command and Control Flight

- Redesignated on 23 Nov 1979
- Activated on 1 Jan 1980
- Inactivated on 1 Jun 1980

623rd Tactical Control Squadron

- Redesignated on 18 Jan 1983
- Activated on 1 April 1983

623rd Air Control Squadron

- Redesignated on 1 April 1992

623d Air Control Flight

- Redesignated on 1 August 1994

623d Air Control Squadron

- Redesignated on 15 April 2016

== Assignments ==
- I Fighter Command – 1 Apr 1943
- 72d Fighter Wing – 19 Dec 1943
- 2nd Air Force – 21 Mar 1944
- 7th Air Force – 2 Jun 1944
- VII Fighter Command – 2 Jun 1944
- 7th Fighter Wing – 15 Aug 1944
- 7th Provisional Control Group (Special)(Attached) – 10–30 Sep 1944
- 576th Signal Air Warning Battalion – 1 Oct 1944
- 7th Fighter Wing Aircraft Control Group – 20 Jan 1945
- 7th Air Force – 14 Jul 1945
- VII Bomber Command - 1 Dec 1945
- 8th Air Force - 1 Jan 1946
- 301st Fighter Wing - Jan 1946
- 3rd Operational Group (Provisional)(Attached) (301st Fighter Wing) - 1 Nov 1947 – 1 May 1948
- 529th Aircraft Control and Warning Group - 2 May 1948
- 313th Air Division - 15 Mar 1955
- 51st Fighter-Interceptor Wing (Attached) - 27 Mar 1958 – 17 Jul 1960
- 51st Fighter-Interceptor Wing - 18 Jul 1960
- 18th Tactical Fighter Wing - 21 May 1971
- Inactivated 8 Jul 1973
- Activated 1 Jan 1980
- Pacific Air Forces - 1 Jan 1980
- Inactivated 1 Jun 1980
- Activated 1 Apr 1983
- 5th Tactical Air Control Group - 1 Apr 1983
- 5th Air Force - 17 Feb 1987
- 18th Operations Group - 1 Oct 1991 – present

== Operational locations ==
- Bradley Field, Connecticut - 1 Mar 1943
- Blackstone Army Air Field, Virginia - 1 Sep 1943
- Galveston Army Air Field, Texas - 20 Dec 1943
- Fort Lawton, Washington - 3 May 1944
- Stanley Army Air Field, Territory of Hawaii - 2 Jun 1944
- Bellows Field, Territory of Hawaii - 15 Feb 1945
- Ie Shima, Japan - 19 Mar 1945 (Detachment 1)
- Fort Shafter, Territory of Hawaii - 4 Apr 1945
- Camp Bishigawa, Japan - Nov 1945
1. Ie Shima Det 1 - Sep 1945
2. Yontan Mountain - 1 Jan 1946 – 24 May 1956
3. Point Tare - May 1946 - Oct 1948
4. Aguni Shima - Oct 1946 - Jun 1947
- Stillwell Park, Kadena AB, Japan - 1 Jun 1950
1. Yontan Mountain (Camp Bishagawa) - 1 Jan 1946 – 24 May 1956
2. Yaetake - 3 Sep 1951 – 31 Jul 1956
3. Yozadake Air Station - 24 May 1956 – 31 Mar 1973
- Yozadake Air Station, Japan - 13 Aug 1956
1. Det 1 Miyako Air Station - Mar 1950 - 15 Feb 1973
2. Det 2 Kume Air Station - Apr 1951 - 15 May 1973
- Naha AB, Japan - 20 Dec 1957 – 8 July 1973
1. Det 1 Miyako Air Station - 1950 - 15 Feb 1973
2. Det 2 Kume Air Station - Apr 1951 - 15 May 1973
3. Det 3 Yozadake Air Station - 8 Mar 1958 – 31 Mar 1973
4. Det 4 Okino Erabu Air Station - 8 Mar 1958 – 31 Dec 1972
5. Det 5 Yaetake - 8 Mar 1958 – 8 Aug 1960
- Kadena AB, Japan - 1 Jan 1980 – 1 Jun 1980
- Kadena AB, Japan - 1 Apr 1983
  - Yozadake Sub Base, Japan (JASDF) - 1 Apr 1994 - 2010 (Forward Operating Location)
1. OLAA Fuchu AB, Japan (JASDF) - 1 Apr 1983 – 31 Mar 1992
2. OLAB Misawa AB, Japan - 1 Apr 1983 – 31 Mar 1992
  - Ohminato Sub Base, Japan (JASDF) - 1 Apr 1983 – 31 Mar 1992 (Forward Operating Location)
1. OLAC Naha AB, Japan 01 (JASDF) - Apr 1983 - 31 Mar 1992
- Kadena AB, Japan - 1 Apr 1992
  - Naha AB, Japan (JASDF) - 1 Apr 1983 – Present (Forward Operating Location)
  - Yozadake Sub Base, Japan (JASDF) - 1 Apr 1994 - 2010 (Forward Operating Location)
1. Det 1 Fuchu AB, Japan (JASDF) - 1 Apr 1983 – 31 Jul 1994
2. Det 2 Misawa Air Base, Japan - 1 Apr 1992 – 31 Jul 1994
- Kadena AB, Japan - 1 Apr 1994 – present
1. Naha AB, Japan (JASDF) - 1 Apr 1994 – Present (Forward Operating Location)
2. Yozadake Sub Base, Japan (JASDF) - 1 Apr 1994 - 2010 (Forward Operating Location)

== Past commanders ==
1. Capt Dangerfield (Acting) - 7 Apr 1943
2. Capt Walter H. Birch - 21 Apr 1943
3. Maj Carl L. Cook - 6 Nov 1943
4. LT Paul W. Brownfield - 20 Mar 1944
5. LT Chester Cohen - 21 Dec 1944
6. Capt Paul W. Brownfield - 23 Feb 1945
7. Capt Burton Kirby - Sep 1945
8. Maj Franklin L. Fisher - 18 Jan 1946
9. Capt Ivan L. Corzine - Oct 1947
10. Major Donald H. Higgins - 5 Nov 1947
11. Major Sewal Y. Austin - Feb 1948
12. Capt James A. Ward - Sep 1948
13. Capt Lewis R. Meek - Dec 1948
14. Capt John Welch - Aug 1949
15. Capt James Hislopby - Sep 1949
16. Major Charles F Himes - Apr 1950
17. Capt Charles F. Hobart - 28 Jul 1950
18. Lt Col William Worden - Aug 1950
19. Major Harry C. Ross - 21 Aug 1951
20. Major George C. Schmidt - 21 Nov 1951
21. Major John E. Morgan - Mar 1952
22. Major Wendell A. Steele - Apr 1954
23. Capt Edward J. Jiru - 22 June 1954
24. Major Joseph F. Girius Jr. - 7 Jul 1954
25. Major Jay Pryor - Sep 1954
26. Major Horace M. Jacks - 6 Oct 1954
27. Lt Col Harry O. Flathmann - 1 May 1955
28. Major Maurice M. Gouchoe - 13 Jul 1956
29. Lt Col James R. Greary Jr. - 3 Jan 1957
30. Lt Col William A Beard - 3 Jan 1958
31. Major Maurice Morrison - 14 Mar 1958
32. Lt Col William R. Crooks - 23 Jul 1959
33. Major Frank W. Dawson - 20 Dec 1960
34. Lt Col Edward A. Sanders - 30 Jan 1961
35. Lt Col Roland L. Wolfe - 11 Aug 1962
36. Major Martin R Ring - 10 Feb 1963
37. Lt Col Ronald M. Cottrill - Dec 1964
38. Lt Col James A. Gerwick - 27 Jan 1967
39. Lt Col James A. Gerwick - 26 Jun 1968
40. Lt Col Clarence P. Elder - 16 Dec 1968
41. Major Nathan L. Walker - 11 Jun 1970
42. Lt Col Thomas L. Fulton Jr. - 12 May 1971
43. Lt Col David L. Oakes - 26 Jul 1971
44. Lt Col Thomas L. Fulton Jr. - 21 Jun 1972
45. Colonel Robert W. Casey - 27 Jul 1972
46. Lt Col Ferdinand J. Kubala - 26 May 1973
47. Major Dennis E. Moe - 1 Apr 1983
48. Major Robert F. Williams Jr. - 16 Jul 1984
49. Lt Col Franklin K. Reyher Jr. - 24 Aug 1986
50. Lt Col Kris Lamphere - 13 Aug 1990
51. Lt Col James M Johnson III - 13 Apr 1992
52. Lt Col Howard Don - Jun 1994
53. Lt Col Kenneth G. "Doc" Eide - Jul 1995
54. Major Robert C. Clinton - May 1996
55. Capt Donna L. Denman - Jun 1997
56. Major Daniel L. "Duke" Whitten - Jul 1997
57. Major Daniel Reilly - 28 Jun 1998
58. Major James A. "Dill" Pickle - 23 Jun 2000
59. Major John M. "Squeak" Askew - 13 Jul 2001
60. Major Edward A. "Oscar" Meyer - 10 Jul 2002
61. Major Thomas W. Coppersmith - 23 Jun 2003
62. Major Jessica Baker - 6 May 2004
63. Lt Col Michael S. "Crank" Christie - 23 Jan 2005
64. Major Charles W. "Viking" Dennison - 19 Apr 2007
65. Major Nathaniel "Nate" Dash - Dec 2007
66. Major Anthony J. Owens - Aug 2008
67. Major Jeff C. "Walleye" Watts - May 2010
68. Lt Col Paul S. "Sparky" Nichols - 14 May 2012
69. Lt Col Daniel V. "Lucky" Biehl - 23 Jun 14
70. Lt Col Joel "Deuce" Doss - 23 Jun 17
71. Lt Col Jeffrey A. "Mac" McKiernan - 30 Apr 19
72. Lt Col Jeffrey T. "JT" Mitchell - 11 June 21
73. Lt Col Richard "Ranch" Ranachowski Jr. - 11 June 23

== Notable members ==
- Lt Col William R. Dunn - April 1958 to April 1960 - The first American ace of World War II
- Brigadier General Jack T. Martin - 1945 to 1946
