= 19th Fighter Squadron =

19th Fighter Squadron

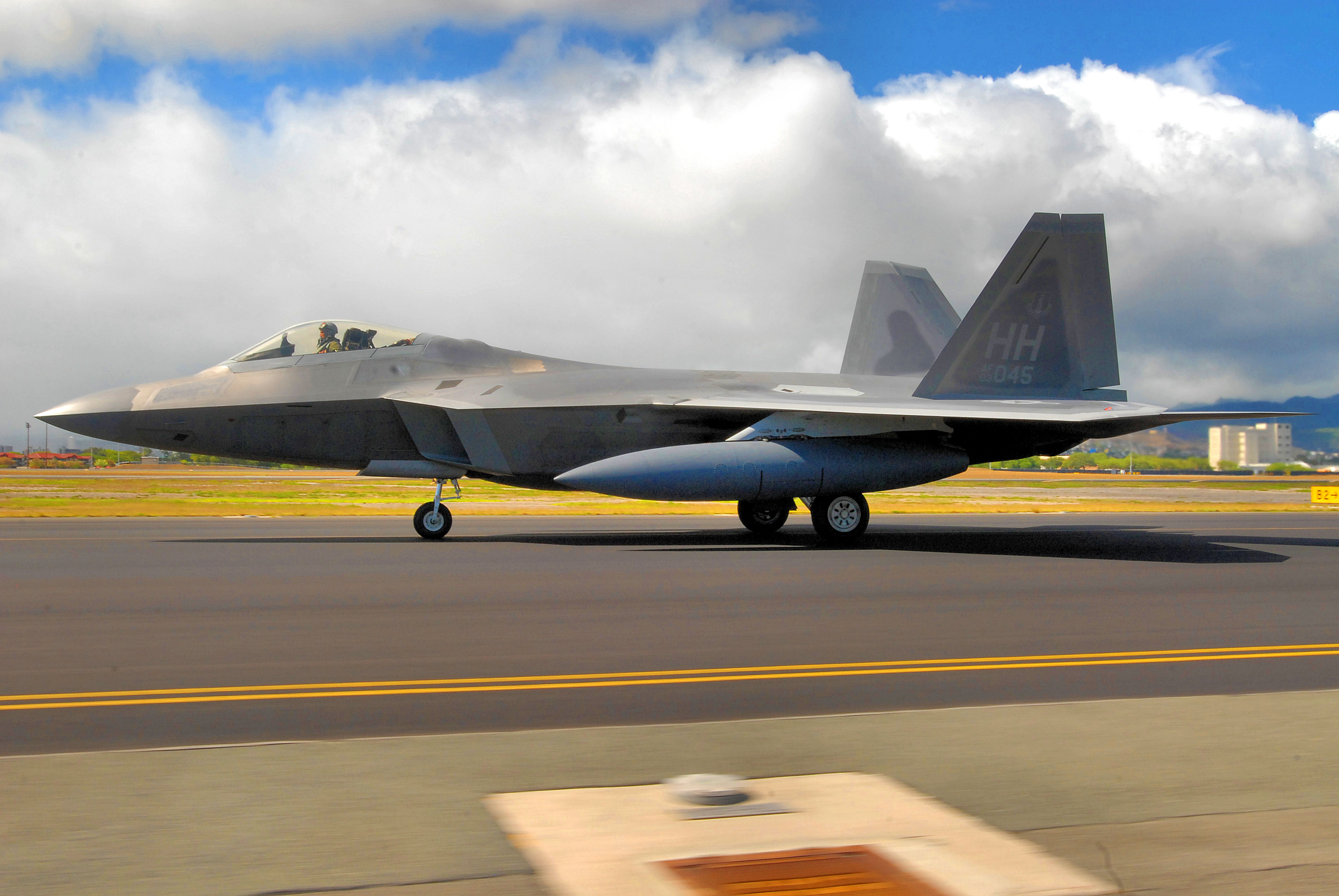
- F-22A Raptor arriving at Hickam Air Force Base (Note: Aircraft is Lockheed Martin F-22A LRIP Block 3 Block 20 Raptor serial 03-4045, taken on 2 July 2010)
- Active: 1917–1919; 1921–1922; 1923–1946; 1982–1993; 1994–present
- Country: United States
- Branch: United States Air Force
- Role: Fighter
- Part of: Pacific Air Forces
- Garrison/HQ: Joint Base Pearl Harbor–Hickam
- Nickname: Gamecocks
- Equipment: Lockheed Martin F-22 Raptor
- Engagements: Pearl Harbor; Battle of Saipan; Battle of Tinian; Battle of Guam; Operation Southern Watch
- Decorations: Air Force Outstanding Unit Award

Commanders
- Current commander: Lt Col Paul "Loco" Lopez

Insignia
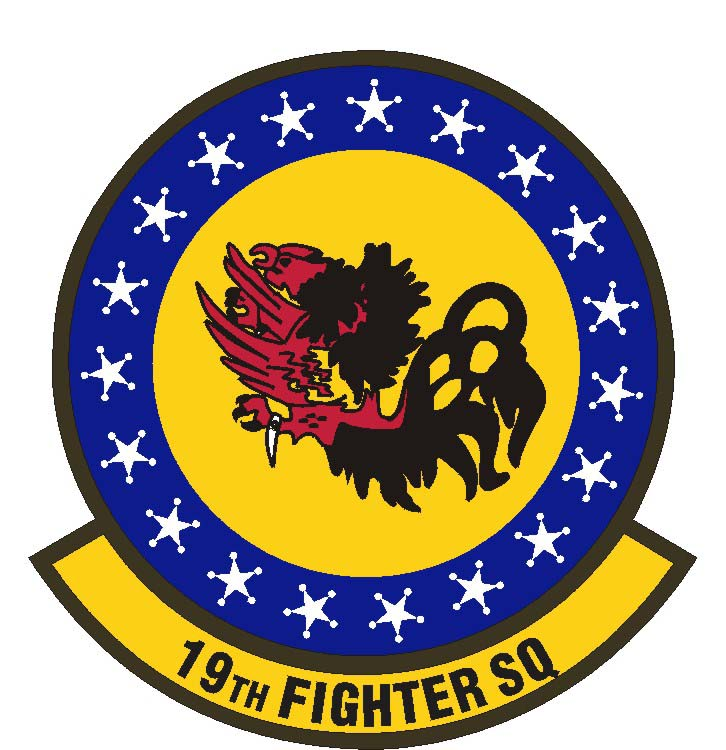
- 19th Fighter Squadron emblem (approved 12 November 1993)

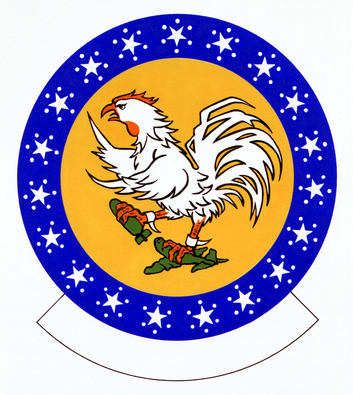
- 19th Tactical Fighter Squadron emblem (approved 10 December 1981)

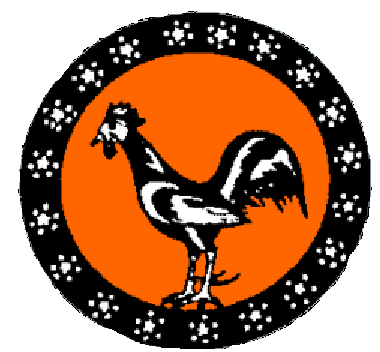
- 19th Pursuit Squadron emblem (approved 20 April 1928)

The 19th Fighter Squadron is a United States Air Force fighter squadron and is a part of the Pacific Air Forces' (PACAF) 15th Wing based at Joint Base Pearl Harbor–Hickam, Hawaii.

The squadron is one of the oldest in the United States Air Force, its origins dating to 14 June 1917, being organized at Kelly Field, Texas. It served overseas in France as part of the American Expeditionary Force during World War I. The squadron saw combat during World War II and became part of the Tactical Air Command during the Cold War.

Today, the 19th FS operates the F-22 Raptor aircraft conducting offensive and defensive counterair (air-to-air) missions, as well as strategic attack, interdiction, and suppression of enemy air defenses. The 19th FS is an active associate total force integration (TFI) unit augmenting the 199th FS in support of Operation Noble Eagle and taskings in the INDOPACOM area of responsibility.

== History ==
=== World War I ===
Originally established as an Army Flying School Squadron, the 19th was based in Texas, Ohio, and New York for short periods. After a few weeks at the Air Service Replacement Concentration Barracks in St. Maixent, from 1 January 1918, the squadron moved to the Seventh Aviation Instruction Center (repair) at Aulnat Aerodrome, east of Clermont-Ferrand, France, to train and observe the French company Michelin's airplane manufacture and assembly procedures. Till the end of 1918, it remained with the 7th AIC. The squadron left France on 18 March 1919, after departing for Cenac, close to Bordeaux, on 29 December.

=== Inter-war years ===
Renamed the 19th Pursuit Squadron, the squadron flew from various locations in the Hawaiian Islands beginning in 1923.

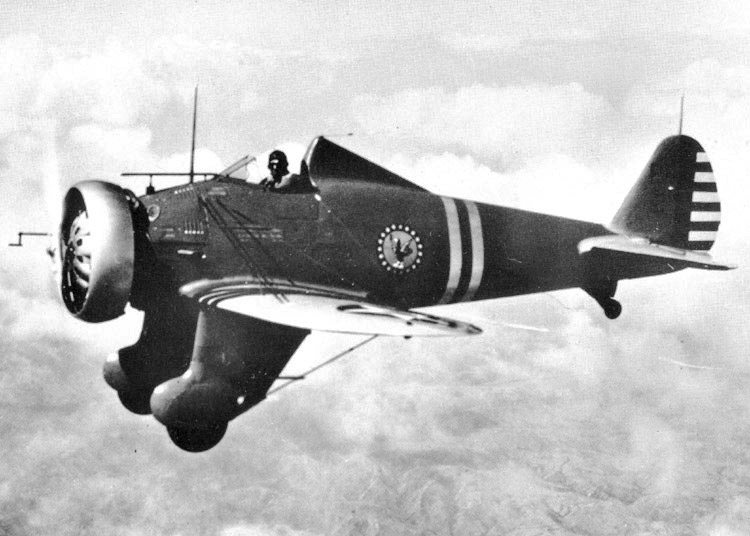
Boeing P-26 "Peashooter" of the 19th Pursuit Squadron

=== World War II ===
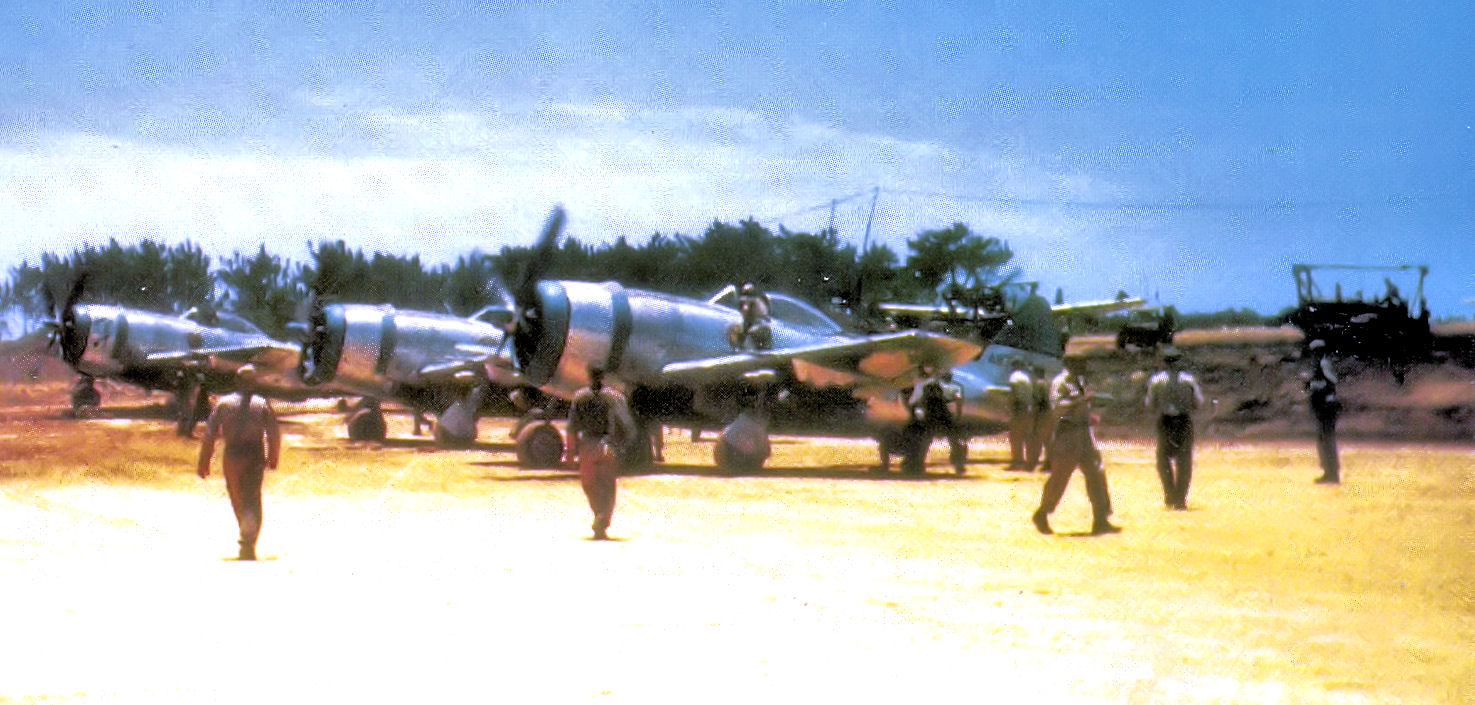
19th Fighter Squadron P-47N Thunderbolt, Ie Shima Airfield, 1945

The squadron suffered six casualties as a result of the attack on Pearl Harbor by the Japanese on 7 December 1941, but no fatalities.

The squadron was then stationed aboard the USS Natoma Bay, off Saipan. Upon arriving, the 19th flew night and day missions, strafing and using general-purpose bombs and rockets in support of advancing U.S. ground troops. Using homemade napalm bombs made out of napalm, gasoline, and oil placed inside fuel tanks, the 19th helped U.S. forces successfully invade and capture the Saipan, Tinian, and Guam islands in only three months. The squadron's mission then changed to long-range bomber escort missions with occasional strike missions to nearby Pagan Island and Iwo Jima. The squadron then relocated to Okinawa, where the first 19 FS pilots were awarded their 'ace' rating. Later, in August 1945, after numerous aerial victories and assorted bombing missions, it participated in the Japanese surrender.

=== Cold War ===
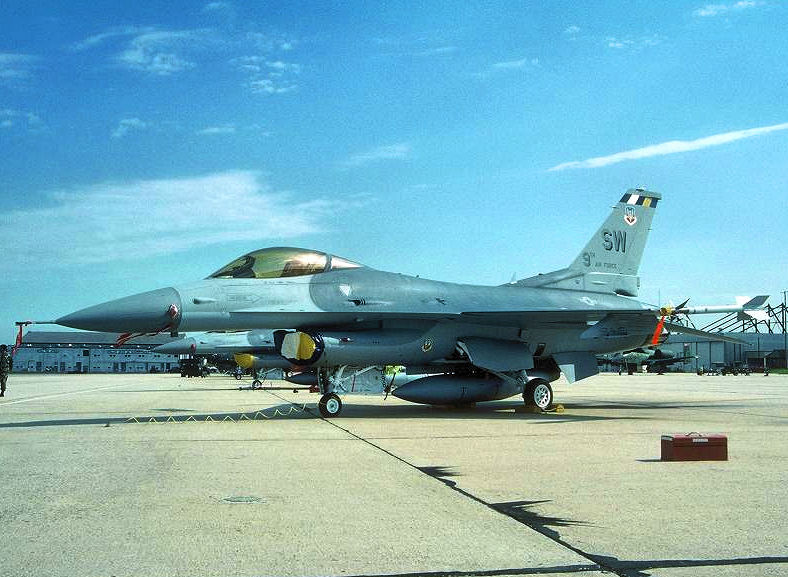
F-16C Block 42F Fighting Falcon 89-2098 about 2000 at Shaw AFB

From 1982 – 1993, it trained for close air support, air-to-air superiority, and maintained a state of readiness to deploy worldwide. In June 1987, the 19th set a new world record for the number of F-16 sorties flown in one day with 160, besting the previous record of 144. In September 1992, the 19th deployed to Southwest Asia to fly combat air patrol missions to enforce the terms of the United Nations cease fire agreement following Operation Desert Storm.

=== Modern era ===
On 1 January 1994, the 19th took over personnel, facilities and equipment of 43d Fighter Squadron at Elmendorf Air Force Base, Alaska. It won the Hughes Trophy in recognition as the top air superiority squadron in the USAF for 2001. Since 1994, it has mobilized, deployed, and employed fighter aircraft worldwide to accomplish air superiority in support of warfighting commanders.

In 2010, the 19th became part of the 15th Wing at Joint Base Pearl Harbor–Hickam. The 19th is an associate unit with the Hawaii Air National Guard's 199th Fighter Squadron.

== Lineage ==
19th Aero Squadron

- Organized as the 14th Aero Squadron (I) on 14 June 1917 (Note: A later 14th Aero Squadron (which can be designated (II) to avoid confusion) was activated at Rockwell Field, California on 14 August 1917. It was redesignated Squadron A, Rockwell Field, California, on 23 July 1918. The 14th Bombardment Squadron, which was wiped out in the 1941/42 Battle of the Philippines, was the heir to that unit's lineage and honors.)

Redesignated 19th Aero Squadron on 26 June 1917
Demobilized on 14 April 1919

- Reconstituted and consolidated with the 19th Pursuit Squadron on 20 December 1923

19th Fighter Squadron

- Constituted as the 19th Squadron (Pursuit) on 30 August 1921

Organized on 1 October 1921
Inactivated on 29 June 1922

- Redesignated 19th Pursuit Squadron on 25 January 1923

Activated on 1 May 1923
Redesignated: 19th Pursuit Squadron (Interceptor) on 6 December 1939
Redesignated: 19th Fighter Squadron on 15 May 1942
Redesignated: 19th Fighter Squadron, Single Engine on 20 August 1943
Inactivated on 12 January 1946

- Redesignated 19th Tactical Fighter Squadron on 11 December 1981

Activated on 1 April 1982
Redesignated: 19th Fighter Squadron on 1 November 1991
Inactivated on 31 December 1993

- Activated on 1 January 1994

=== Assignments ===
- Unknown, 14 June 1917 – February 1918
- Seventh Aviation Instruction Center, February–December 1918
- Unknown, January–April 1919
- Ninth Corps Area, 1 October 1921 – 29 June 1922
- 17th Composite Group, 1 May 1923
- 5th Composite Group, 15 January 1924
- 18th Pursuit (later, 18th Fighter) Group, January 1927
- 318th Fighter Group, 16 March 1943 – 12 January 1946
- 363d Tactical Fighter (later, 363d Fighter) Wing, 1 April 1982
- 363d Operations Group, 1 May 1992 – 31 December 1993
- 3d Operations Group, 1 January 1994 – 2010
- 15th Operations Group, 2010 – present

=== Stations ===
- Camp Kelly, Texas, 14 June 1917
- Wilbur Wright Field, Ohio, 1 August 1917
- Garden City, New York, 31 October–3 December 1917
- St Maxient, France, 1 January 1918
- Aulnat aerodrome, France, 6 February 1918
- Cénac, Bordeaux, France, c. 29 December 1918-c. 18 March 1919
- Mitchel Field, New York, c. 5–14 April 1919
- March Field, California, 1 October 1921 – 29 June 1922
- Wheeler Field, Hawaii, 1 May 1923
- Luke Field, Hawaii, 15 January 1924
- Wheeler Field, Hawaii, 11 January 1927
- Bellows Field, Hawaii, 20 February 1942
- Kualoa Airfield, Hawaii, 22 May 1942
- Bellows Field, Hawaii, 20 October 1942
- Barbers Point Naval Air Station, Hawaii, 9 February 1943
- Kipapa Airfield, Hawaii, 30 May 1943
- Stanley Field, Hawaii Territory, 4 September 1943
- Kualoa Airfield, Hawaii, 26 December 1943
- Bellows Field, Hawaii Territory, 18 April 1944
- East Field, Saipan, Mariana Islands, 29 June 1944
- Ie Shima Airfield, Ryukyu Islands, 30 April 1945
- Naha Airfield, Okinawa, November–December 1945
- Fort Lewis, Washington, 11–12 January 1946
- Shaw Air Force Base, South Carolina, 1 April 1982 – 31 December 1993
- Elmendorf Air Force Base, Alaska, 1 January 1994 – 2010
- Joint Base Pearl Harbor–Hickam, Hawaii, 2010–present

=== Aircraft ===
- Curtiss JN-6H (1921–1922, 1923–1926)
- Royal Aircraft Factory S.E.5 (1921–1922, 1923–1926)
- Thomas-Morse MB-3 (1923–1926)
- Airco DH.4 (1923–1926)
- Boeing PW-9 (1927–1930)
- Boeing P-12 (1931–1937, 1938–1941)
- Boeing P-26 Peashooter (1938–1941)
- Curtiss P-36 Hawk (1938–1941)
- A-12 Shrike (1938–1941)
- North American BT-9 (1938–1941)
- Douglas OA-3 Dolphin (1938–1941)
- Curtiss P-40 Warhawk (1941–1943)
- Republic P-47 Thunderbolt (1943–1945)
- Lockheed P-38 Lightning (1944–1945)
- General Dynamics F-16 Fighting Falcon (1982–1993)
- McDonnell Douglas F-15 Eagle (1994–2010)
- Lockheed Martin F-22 Raptor (2010–present)

== See also ==
- List of American aero squadrons
