= William R. Dunn (aviator) =

American flying ace of World War II

William Robert Dunn
- Born: November 16, 1916; Minneapolis, Minnesota, U.S.
- Died: February 14, 1995 (aged 78); Colorado Springs, Colorado, U.S.
- Burial place: Fort Logan National Cemetery
- Military career
- Allegiance: Canada; United Kingdom; United States
- Branch: United States Army (1934–35); Canadian Army (1939–40); Royal Air Force (1940–43); United States Army Air Forces (1943–47); United States Air Force (1947–73)
- Service years: 1934–1935; 1939–1973
- Rank: Lieutenant colonel
- Nickname: "Poppy"
- Unit: No. 71 Squadron RAF
- Conflicts: World War II; Chinese Civil War; Vietnam War
- Awards: Legion of Merit; Distinguished Flying Cross; Bronze Star Medal (2); Air Medal (13); Air Force Commendation Medal

Lieutenant Colonel William Robert "Poppy" Dunn (November 16, 1916 – February 14, 1995) was the first American flying ace of World War II. Joining the Canadian Army at the outbreak of war in 1939, he was an infantryman until he transferred to the Royal Air Force (RAF) in late 1940. After service in an RAF Eagle Squadron, he joined the United States Army Air Forces in 1943. Transferring to the newly established United States Air Force in 1947, he also participated in the Chinese Civil War, Cold War and the Vietnam War.

== Early life ==
Bill Dunn was born on November 16, 1916, in Minneapolis, Minnesota. He enlisted in the United States Army on March 19, 1934, and served as an infantryman until receiving an honorable discharge on November 22, 1935.

== Military career ==
Following the outbreak of World War II, Dunn enlisted in the Canadian Army on September 7, 1939, attaining the rank of sergeant major before joining the Royal Air Force on December 13, 1940. After completing RAF Flying School at Tern Hill, England, on April 16, 1941, Pilot Officer Dunn was assigned to the RAF's No. 71 Squadron, also known as the initial Eagle Squadron (so named because it was composed of expatriate American pilots in the RAF prior to the official entry of the United States into World War II) from May to August 1941, during which time he became the first American fighter ace of World War II by destroying 5 German fighters in aerial combat plus a shared probable; all while flying RAF Hawker Hurricane and Supermarine Spitfire fighters. After being wounded in action on August 27, 1941, Dunn was hospitalized for 3 months and then spent another 3 months in the U.S. on leave before serving as an instructor pilot in Canada until he transferred to the U.S. Army Air Forces on June 15, 1943.

Lieutenant Dunn served as a gunnery officer with the 53rd Fighter Group and then joined the 513th Fighter Squadron of the 406th Fighter-Bomber Group, flying the P-47 Thunderbolt, in October 1943, and deployed with the group to England in April 1944. He was credited with the destruction of his 6th and final enemy aircraft in aerial combat in June 1944. Promoted to captain and then major, he later completed Command & General Staff College before transferring to China, where he served as commander of Luchien and Luchow Air Bases as a lieutenant colonel from May 1945 to 1947, participating in the Chinese Civil War on the side of the Nationalists. His next assignment was as an advisor to the Imperial Iranian Air Force from 1947 to 1949.

Dunn resigned his commission on November 3, 1949, and rejoined the Air Force in an enlisted capacity on November 14, 1949, attaining the rank of Master Sergeant before receiving an appointment as an Air Force Warrant Officer on April 17, 1952. During this time, he served as an advisor to the Brazilian Air Force from 1950 to 1952. Promoted to Chief Warrant Officer, CWO Dunn served as a staff officer from 1952 to 1954, and then served as an Aircraft Controller, Interceptor Controller, Air Traffic Controller, and Wing Support Officer for the 33rd Air Division at Tinker AFB, Oklahoma, from May 1954 to February 1958. His next assignment was as a Weapons Controller with the 623rd Aircraft Control & Warning Squadron at Naha AB, Okinawa, from April 1958 to April 1960, and then with the 51st Fighter Interceptor Wing at Naha AB from April 1960 to July 1961. CWO Dunn next served as a staff officer with Headquarters, 29th Air Division at Richards-Gebaur AFB, Missouri, from July 1961 to May 1963, followed by service as a Weapons Controller with the 848th AC&W Squadron at Wallace AS in the Philippines from May 1963 to May 1964. He served as a Weapons Officer on the staff of Headquarters, Pacific Air Forces (PACAF) at Hickam AFB, Hawaii, from May 1964 to May 1967, and then deployed to Southeast Asia, where he served as a Weapons Force Plans Officer with the 6250th Support Squadron at Tan Son Nhut AB, South Vietnam, from May 1967 to June 1968.

Dunn's final assignment was as a Weapons Controller with Headquarters, Aerospace Defense Command at Ent AFB, Colorado, from June 1968 until his retirement from the Air Force on February 1, 1973. He was promoted to Chief Warrant Officer 4 (W-4) in 1963, but retired at his highest rank held of Lieutenant Colonel (O-5). Bill Dunn died on February 14, 1995, and was buried at the Fort Logan National Cemetery in Denver, Colorado. Although only officially credited with 6 air victories in World War II, Dunn claimed 8.5 in the air, plus 4 more unconfirmed, 3 probables, 4 damaged, and 12 more destroyed on the ground while strafing enemy airfields.

In addition to his autobiography, Fighter Pilot: The First American Ace of World War II, he wrote War Drum Echoes and other works on the Indian wars of North America.
