= VII Fighter Command =

VII Fighter Command (later, 20th Fighter Wing, 46th Fighter Wing)
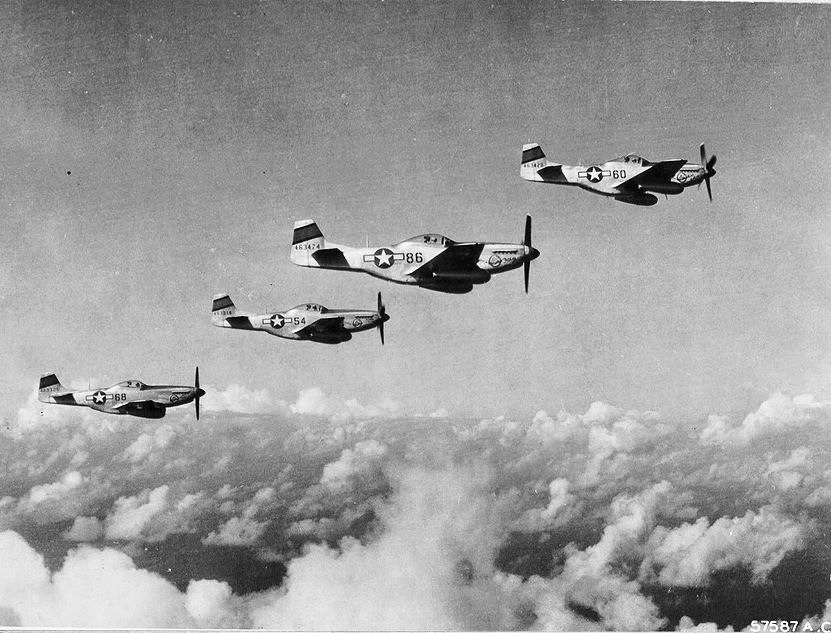
- VII Fighter Command P-51D Mustangs flying a B-29 escort mission from Iwo Jima in June 1945 (Note: Aircraft are North American P-51D-20-NA Mustangs, serials 44-63325 44-63314, 44-63474 and 44-63428. They are from the 45th Fighter Squadron of the 15th Fighter Group at Central Field.)
- Active: 1942–1948
- Country: United States
- Branch: United States Air Force
- Role: Command of fighter units
- Engagements: Pacific Ocean Theater

The VII Fighter Command was a command and control organization of the United States Army Air Forces. Its last assignment was with Far East Air Forces. The Headquarters were based at several locations with forward command moving with the campaigns. It was redesignated the 20th Fighter Wing and later, the 46th Fighter Wing before inactivating on 24 August 1948.

== History ==
The command was established in Hawaii in February 1942. From its inception until March 1945, the mission of the command was the air defense of the Hawaii Territory. Within ten days after the Attack on Pearl Harbor, the VII Interceptor Command consolidated all Hawaiian Islands defense units. In May 1942, the unit was redesignated the VII Fighter Command, constituting the fighter arm of Seventh Air Force, and its defensive responsibilities expanded to include Midway Island; Canton Island Airfield in the Phoenix Islands and Christmas Island Airfield in the Line Islands.

Its assigned units were deployed to forward bases in the Central Pacific Area in rotational deployments. During the assault on the Marshall Islands by Seventh Air Force bombers that began in late 1943, VII Fighter Command pioneered the use of long range fighter escort in the Pacific theater. B-25 Mitchell medium bombers attacking the island chain were being harassed by Japanese fighters who would begin their attacks after the bombing run and break off at the point they estimated to be the maximum range of Seventh Air Force fighters. The Seventh eventually fitted some of its P-40 Warhawks with belly tanks, and on 26 January 1944, sent them out to wait above the clouds for the pursuing Japanese. They shot down ten enemy fighters in three minutes, effectively ending interception of the bombers over the Marshalls.

By March 1944, VII Fighter Command was back on Oahu for regrouping, reinforcement, aircraft transition, and general reorganization in preparation for the Marianas campaign. Its strength was increased from four squadrons to three complete fighter groups of three squadrons each.

It was during the Mariana and Palau Islands campaign in mid-1944 that the command began their transition from a static defensive unit in the rear to the spearhead of the attacks on Japan. VII Fighter Command participated in the seizure and consolidation of that island group and, more importantly, gained valuable experience in long-range operations, escorting Thirteenth Air Force B-24 Liberators on strikes to Iwo Jima and Truk from its base on Saipan.

Beginning in March 1945, the command was reassigned to Twentieth Air Force on Iwo Jima, which had been seized by Marine Corps units to provide emergency landing fields for B-29 Superfortresses. From its forward airfields on Iwo Jima, its mission became the command and control echelon of fighter groups providing escort of B-29 Superfortress bombers operating from bases in the Mariana Islands. The command's units flew Very Long Range (VLR) bomber escort operations against the armed forces of the Empire of Japan.

On 7 April 1945, 119 P-51 Mustangs of VII Fighter Command lifted off from Iwo Jima on the first Very Long Range (VLR) mission by land-based fighter aircraft against the Japanese mainland. Off the coast of Honshu they rendezvoused with more than 100 B-29 Superfortresses for an attack on the Nakajima aircraft plant in Tokyo. The B-29s had been taking heavy losses to Japanese fighters on these Empire strikes, but the 110 to 125 who came up to greet them this day were in for a surprise.

VII Fighter command pilots described the Japanese, who attacked singly during the bomb run and immediately after, as easy targets for the Mustangs that broke off in pairs to engage them. Combined, the American fighters and bombers accounted for 71 Japanese aircraft destroyed, with 30 probably destroyed of the 44 that were damaged.

After the end of the war, the command was redesignated a Wing, with the elimination of the command echelon in the postwar Air Force. It moved to Guam in the Marianas and remained assigned to the Far East Air Force. The organization was inactivated on 24 August 1948.

== Commanders ==
- Brig Gen Howard C Davidson, Feb 1942
- Brig Gen Robert W Douglass Jr, Oct 1942
- Brig Gen Ernest Moore, May 1944
- Col Thayer S Olds, 4 Sep 1945
- Brig Gen Winslow C Morse, 26 Sep 1946
- Col Romulus W Puryear, Jan-24 Aug 1948

https://www.armyaircorpsmuseum.org/VII_Fighter_Command.cfm

== Lineage ==
- Constituted as the 7th Interceptor Command on 23 January 1942 (Note: Maurer indicates that the unit was constituted as the "VII" Fighter Command. However, the unit was constituted and activated with an arabic number in its name. The use of roman numerals to designate Army Air Forces combat commands did not begin until September 1942. "Air Force Historical Research Agency Organizational Reconds: Types of USAF Organizations". Air Force History Index. 9 January 2008.)

Activated on 2 February 1942
Redesignated 7th Fighter Command 24 May 1942
Redesignated VII Fighter Command c. 18 September 1942
Redesignated 20th Fighter Wing in May 1946
Redesignated 46th Fighter Wing in December 1947 (Note: Another 20th Fighter Wing was organized in 1947 under the Air Force's Wing Base Organization, which required the wing to be renumbered.)
Inactivated on 24 August 1948

- Disbanded on 15 June 1983

=== Assignments ===
- Seventh Air Force, 2 February 1942
- Unknown, 1 March 1945
- Seventh Air Force, 14 July 1945
- Unknown, 16 July 1945
- Twentieth Air Force, 5 Aug 1945
- Far East Air Forces, 15 April 1946 – 24 August 1948

=== Stations ===
- Fort Shafter, Hawaii: 2 February 1942
- Hickam Field, Hawaii: 20 October 1944
- Ft Kamehameha, of Hawaii: 18 January 1945
- Central Field (Iwo Jima), Japan, 1 March 1945
- East Field (Saipan), Mariana Islands, 1 December 1945
- North Field (later Andersen Air Force Base), Guam, Mariana Islands, 15 April 1946 – 24 August 1948

=== Components ===
Wing

- 7th Fighter Wing: (attached) 24 April 1944 – 15 August 1944

Groups

- 15th Pursuit Group (later 15th Fighter Group): 2 February 1942 – 16 July 1945
- 18th Pursuit Group (later 18th Fighter Group): 2 February 1942 – 14 April 1943 (Note: Haulman and Robertson give the assignment dates for the 15th and 18th Groups as 23 January 1942, but this is the constitution date for the command, not its activation date.)
- 21st Fighter Group: 24 April – 3 July 1944; 10 November 1944 – 10 October 1946 (attached to 7th Fighter Wing until 28 February 1945)
- 23d Fighter Group: 10 October 1946 – 16 August 1948
- 318th Fighter Group: 15 October 1942 – Dec 1945

Squadron

- 305th Fighter Control Squadron, 2 June – 15 August 1944
