= 318th Fighter Group =

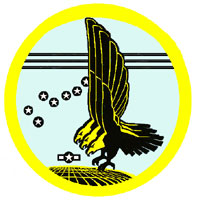
- 318th Fighter Group Insignia
- Active: 1942–1946
- Country: United States
- Branch: United States Army Air Forces
- Role: Fighter
- Part of: Twentieth Air Force
- Garrison/HQ: Pacific Ocean Theater of World War II
- Engagements: World War II; Asiatic-Pacific Campaign (1944–1945)

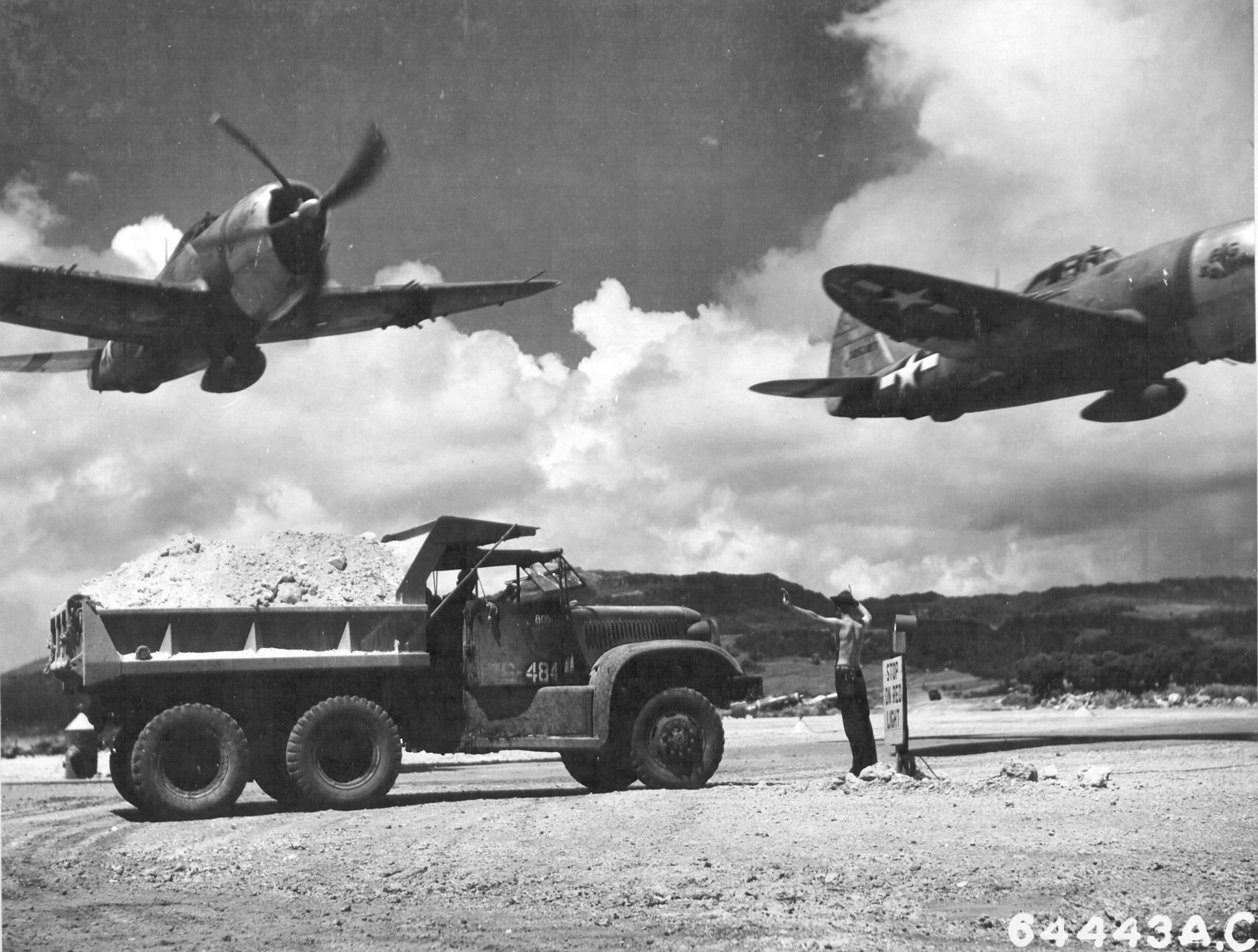
P-47 Thunderbolts from the 318th Fighter Group taking off from East Field on Saipan, Marianas Islands in October 1944. Lead ship: "Big Squaw" Republic-Evansville P-47D-20-RA Thunderbolt s/n 43-25327 19th FS, 318th FG, 7th AF Assigned to John "Jack" H. Payne.

The 318th Fighter Group was a World War II United States Army Air Forces combat organization. It served primarily in the Pacific Ocean theater of World War II.

== History ==
The 318th Fighter Group was activated in October 1942 when the remainders of the 72d and 44th Fighter Squadrons were transferred from the 15th and 18th Groups after their former groups were deployed to the Central Pacific. They were part of the 7th Air Force until summer of 1945. The initial mission of the 318th was air protection of the Hawaiian Islands. The 73d and 333d Fighter Squadrons were transferred in November 1942 and January 1943.

In March 1943 the 44th was transferred out of the group and was replaced by the 19th Fighter Squadron. The group was equipped with P-40Ks, P-40Ns, and Douglas A-24s, but in June 1943 the Bell P-39Q Airacobras began to arrive at Bellows Field and the 72nd Fighter Squadron traded their P-40s for the Flying Cannon, the Bell Airacobra.

In December 1943 the 72nd Fighter Squadron in their P-39s were catapulted from the deck of the Escort aircraft carrier USS Nassau (CVE-16) and landed at Makin atoll on the island of Butaritari. At the completion of the Gilbert and Marshall Islands campaign the 72nd FS was transferred to the newly activated 21st Fighter Group to prepare for the job of escorting the Boeing B-29 Superfortresses over Japan.

During 1944 the 318th was equipped with Republic P-47D Thunderbolts and during the Marianas campaign, working closely with Marine ground forces, pioneered close infantry support and employed the first use of napalm. On Saipan the 318th had the dubious distinction along with the 21st Fighter Group on Iwo Jima of being the only Army Air Force units to engage in ground combat. The squadrons of the 318th Fighter Group were attacked by Japanese ground forces in June 1944 on Aslito Airfield, Saipan (renamed Isley Field), sustaining modest casualties. The 6th Night Fighter Squadron was attached to the 318th on Saipan, and scored several night time victories flying P-61s. Eventually, as they outranged most of their targets, they acquired some P-38 lightnings and flew them as well. However, in the 7th Air Force's heaviest losses since 7 December 1941, the 21st Fighter Group was besieged in their tent camp on Iwo Jima before dawn on 26 March 1945. Pilots and ground personnel took a crash course in infantry tactics and finally destroyed the superior enemy force, but suffered 15 dead and 50 wounded in doing so.

The 318th was the first unit to receive the new long range P-47Ns in early 1945 before moving to Okinawa on Ie Shima.

Army fighter planes flew from aircraft carriers no less than seven times in the Pacific. P-36s to Hawaii in February 1941, the 73d FS to Midway in P-40s in June 1942, the 45th FS to Kanton Island and 72nd FS to Makin in P-39s in December 1943, the 19th, 73d and 333d FS's to Saipan in P-47s in June 1944. The Makin and Saipan operations were from catapult shots. From November 1944 to January 1945, the 318th Fighter Group helped counter the Japanese air attacks on the Mariana Islands.

Most notably, the Seventh's airmen pioneered Very Long Range (VLR) fighter operations across the Pacific with missions of historic length and duration: Kauai to Midway Atoll, Midway to Kaneohe and Makin to Jaluit and Maloelap. By late 1944, Lockheed P-38s of the 318th were routinely flying missions to Truk and Iwo Jima from Saipan—1,500-mile (2,400 km), 8-hour trips. And by 1945, with new long range P-47Ns, VLR sorties were the rule rather than the exception for the Seventh's fighters.

In April 1945 the 15th and 21st Fighter Groups began flying 1,300-mile (2,100 km) escort and sweep missions from Iwo Jima to Honshu-. In May 1945, the 318th Group advanced to le Shima where they reached out to Japanese targets in Kyu-shu- and China.

During the summer of 1945, the 318th Fighter Group (along with the 15th and 21st from the VII Fighter Command) was reassigned to the Twentieth Air Force and continued its fighter sweeps against Japanese airfields and other targets, in addition to flying long-range B-29 escort missions to Japanese cities, until the end of the war. On 13 August 1945, the 318th flew 1,680 statute miles (2,700 km) from le Shima to Tokyo and back, an 8½ hour non-stop flight.

The 318th Group was officially credited with 164 air combat victories by 15 August cease fire, with less than 6 pilots shot down by enemy planes.

The 318th was assigned to Eighth Air Force in August 1945, shortly after V-J Day. Moved to the US, December 1945 – January 1946. Inactivated on 12 January 1946.

After the war, it was redesignated the 102nd Fighter Group in May 1946.

=== Lineage ===
- Constituted as 318th Pursuit Group (Interceptor) on 2 February 1942

Redesignated 318th Fighter Group in May 1942
Activated in Hawaii on 15 October 1942
Inactivated on 12 January 1946

- Redesignated as 102d Fighter Group. Allocated to Massachusetts ANG on 24 May 1946

=== Assignments ===
- VII Fighter Command, 15 October 1942
- Eighth Air Force, 31 July 1945
- Army Service Forces, 29 November 1945 – 12 January 1946

=== Components ===
- 19th Fighter Squadron, 16 March 1943 – 12 January 1946
- 44th Fighter Squadron, 20 October – 1 December 1942
- 72d Fighter Squadron, 15 October 1942 – 15 June 1944
- 73d Fighter Squadron, 15 October 1942 – 12 January 1946
- 333d Fighter Squadron, 11 January 1943 – 12 January 1946
- 318th Fighter Group August 1944– March (?) 1945

=== Aircraft flown ===
- Curtiss P-36 Hawk
- Lockheed P-38 Lightning
- Curtiss P-40 Warhawk
- Bell P-39 Airacobra
- Douglas A-24 Banshee
- Republic P-47 Thunderbolt
- Northrop P-61 Black Widow

=== Stations ===
- Hickam Field, Hawaii (Territory), 15 October 1942
- Bellows Field, Hawaii (Territory), 9 February 1943
- East Field, Saipan, Mariana Islands, June 1944
- Ie Shima Airfield, Okinawa, c. 30 April 1945
- Okinawa, November–December 1945

== See also ==
- 301st Fighter Wing
