= Stanley Field =

Stanley Army Airfield
- Part of Seventh Air Force
- Schofield Barracks, Oahu, Honolulu County, Hawaii, USA

Site information
- Type: Military airfield
- Controlled by: United States Army Air Forces

Location
- Coordinates: 21°29′28.14″N 158°03′33.91″W (Approximate)

Stanley Army Airfield is a former World War II airfield located on Oahu, Hawaii. It was a temporary airfield, used for fighter planes as part of the island's defense. Today it is the site of the Schofield Barracks parade ground, which is named after Frederick C. Weyand, a former commander of the U.S. 25th Infantry Division.

== History ==
United States Army Air Corps Curtiss P-40 Warhawk units based at Stanley Field:

- 318th Fighter Group's 19th Fighter Squad
- 15th Fighter Group's 18th Fighter Squad

== See also ==
- Hawaii World War II Army Airfields
