= 199th Fighter Squadron =

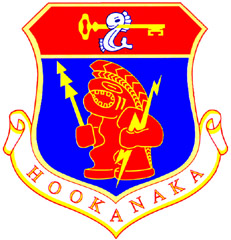
199th Fighter Squadron

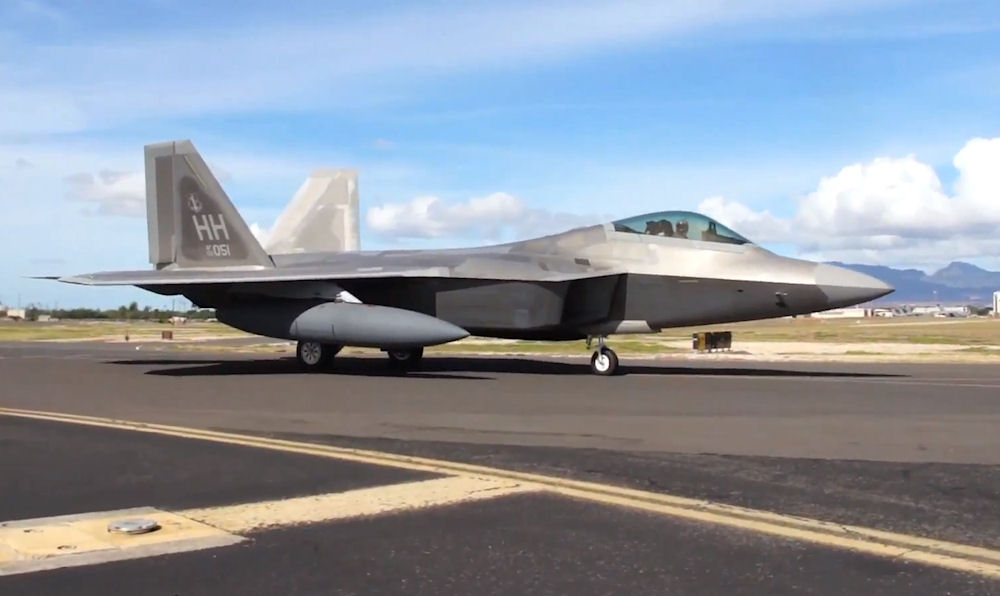
- Squadron F-22A Raptor (Note: Aircraft is Lockheed Martin F-22A LRIP Lot 3 Block 20 Raptor, serial 03-4051.)
- Active: 1944–1946; 1946–present
- Country: United States
- Allegiance: Hawaii
- Branch: Air National Guard
- Type: Squadron
- Role: Fighter
- Part of: Hawaii Air National Guard
- Garrison/HQ: Joint Base Pearl Harbor–Hickam, Hawaii
- Nickname: Mytai Fighters
- Mascot: Kuka'ilimoku

Insignia
- 199th Fighter Squadron emblem: (Note: Approved 18 September 1961. Description: On an Air Force golden yellow Hawaiian shield, oval and pointed at the extremities, and bordered black, a stylized Hawaiian idol black, eyes, nose, mouth and markings voided of the field, malo red, above four shock waves radiating from middle base point upward flanking the idol, two on either side, red and black. Significance: The Hawaiian shield, representing defense, bears a stylized Hawaiian idol as the combat symbol of the squadron. The emblem carries on the historical tradition and spirit of the former emblem as it retains a similar color scheme as well as Hawaiian idol design. The red and black shock waves adapt the design to modern concepts. The red, black, and yellow colors were traditionally used for the feather capes and helmets which the Hawaiian kings and chiefs of old wore in battle.)

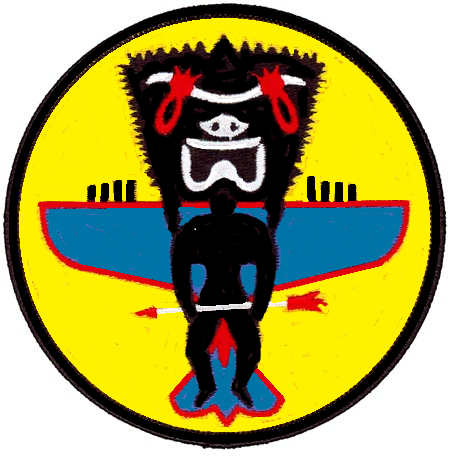
- 199th Fighter Squadron, Single Engine emblem (Note: Approved 25 October 1951. Description: On a disc or fimbriated sable, surmounting a stylized aircraft azure, with rockets gules, a representation of the war god, "Kukailimoku" sable, mouth, nose, eyebrows and spear pole argent, eyes and habit gules. Significance: On a yellow disc, piped black, over a stylized aircraft, light blue, with rockets, red, a representation of the war god, black, red and white, "Kukailimoku ", personal war god of the famous early mythological Hawaiian kings, as Kamehameha I and Umi. The aircraft represents the aerial mission of battle. The kahili is symbolic of authority and was the standard which accompanied the personages of kings and chiefs, identifying their high rank. The shock waves adapt the design to concepts.)

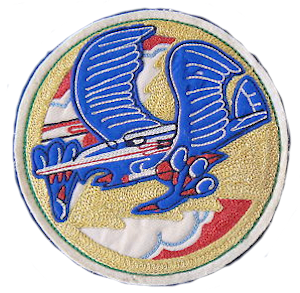
- 464th Fighter Squadron emblem (Note: Description: Over and through a light red disc, border yellow, a jagged thunderbolt in form of pile-like figure, striking from sinister chief to dexter base, surmounted by a stylized, P-47 aircraft in form of a blue falcon, trimmed red, in flight toward dexter, with machine guns affixed to leading edge of wings, firing forward, proper, all surmounting a large, white cloud formation, edged blue. Significance: The caricatured, falcon-like aircraft symbolizes the type of planes with which the Squadron is equipped. The highly incensed falcon represents grim purpose, speed and power. Its oversize claws and belly- tanks depict operational capabilities of bombing or escort, and the guns signify the lightninglike strike of the bird. In the initial background, potency and swiftness are again exemplified in the form of a golden thunderbolt, which is further tribute to the Squadron's faith in the P-47. Clouds and sun in the far background designate the aerial battle ground of operations.)
- Tail code: HH

The 199th Fighter Squadron is a unit of the Hawaii Air National Guard 154th Wing located at Joint Base Pearl Harbor–Hickam, Honolulu, Hawaii. The 199th is equipped with the F-22A Raptor.

== Mission ==
The 199th Fighter Squadron is a unit of the 154th Wing. They operate the F-22A Raptor, the Air Force's 5th generation fighter aircraft with a select component of active duty personnel acting in the cadre role. Its combination of stealth, supercruise, maneuverability and integrated avionics, coupled with improved supportability, represents an exponential leap in warfighting capabilities. The Raptor performs both air-to-air and air-to-ground missions allowing full realization of operational concepts vital to the 21st-century Air Force.

== History ==
=== World War II ===
Established in late 1944 at Peterson Field, Colorado, as the 464th Fighter Squadron. Trained under XXII Bomber Command as a very long range P-47N Thunderbolt bomber escort squadron, programmed for B-29 Superfortress escort duty from Okinawa. For four months they received combat training for long-range escort, strafing, and dive-bombing. Training delayed due to P-47N aircraft non-availability, finally equipped in the late spring of 1945 with the long-distance fighters.

Deployed to Okinawa in June 1945 as part of the 507th Fighter Group and prepared for the invasion of Japan along with the 413th and 414th Fighter Groups, all equipped with P-47N. On 1 July 1945 it began flying airstrikes from Ie Shima, targeting enemy ships, railroad bridges, airfields, factories, and barracks in Japan, Korea, and China. On 8 August 1945 the group escorted B-29 bombers on a raid, shooting down several Japanese fighters.

The squadron flew some long distance fighter-bomber sweeps over Japanese Home Islands 1 July 1945 – 14 August 1945 but never performed operational B-29 escort missions due to the end of the war in August. Last "Ace in a Day" of World War II was 1st Lt Oscar Perdomo of the 464th.

Remained in Okinawa until inactivated in May 1946.

=== Hawaii Air National Guard ===
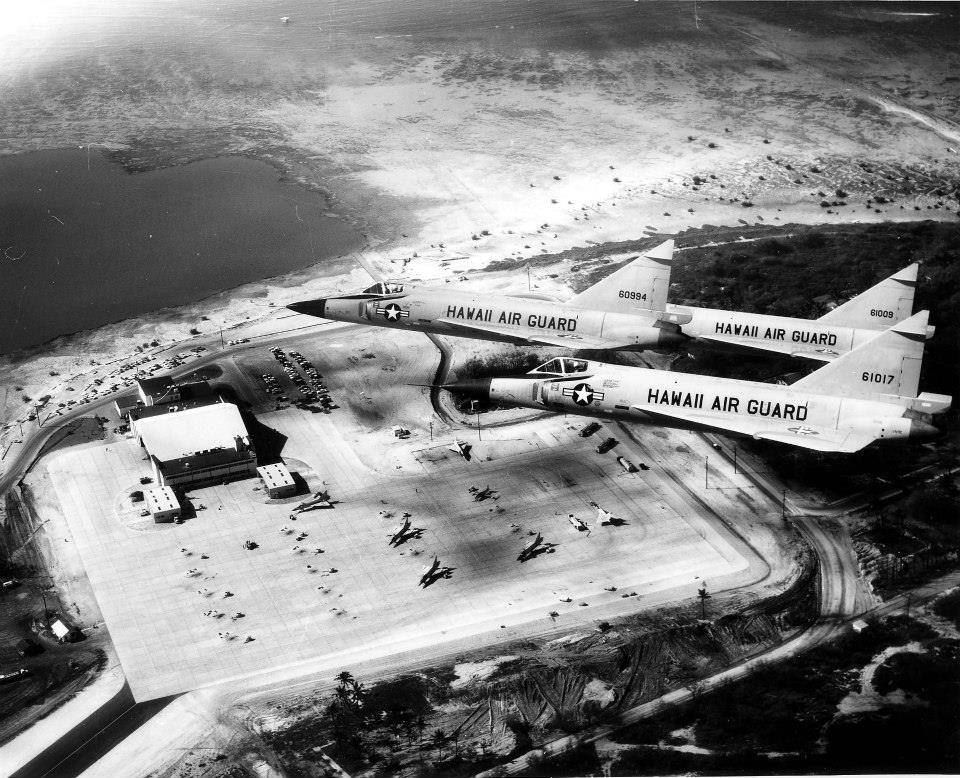
Hawaii Air National Guard F-102 'Deuces' fly over the new 154th Wing complex (Note: The 154th Wing hangar complex was dedicated 17 February 1962, during the Hawaii Air National Guard's 15th anniversary luau.)

The 464th Fighter Squadron was redesignated the 199th Fighter Squadron, and was allotted to the National Guard on 24 May 1946. It was organized at Bellows Field, Waimanalo, Hawaii, and was extended federal recognition on 4 November 1946. The squadron was equipped with F-47N Thunderbolts and was operationally gained by Seventh Air Force. Its mission was the air defense of Hawaii.

Bellows Field, which was attacked during the 7 December 1941 Japanese attack on Oahu, was excess after World War II ended, and it served as home for air elements of the Hawaii National Guard.

In 1947, the costs to operate Bellows as an active National Guard station led the Territorial government to negotiate with the Army about its future. The Army indicated that it wanted to retain the field in a commissioned status but that it had no funds to maintain the field. The Army offered the Aviation Unit of the Hawaiian National Guard joint use of the field provided all maintenance was assumed by the Guard. A settlement was reached to move the 199th to Hickam Field, and to use excess facilities there.

==== Air Defense mission ====
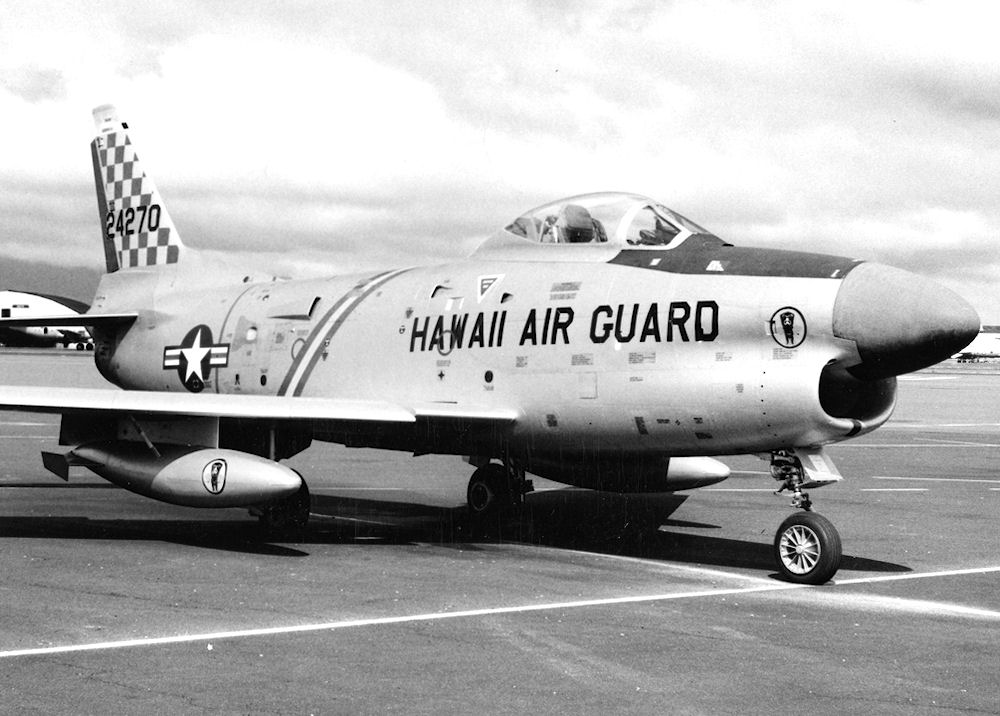
199th FIS F-86L 52-4270, about 1960

The very long range F-47N was used for air defense patrols over the Islands and had a range which could extend its interception ability over a thousand miles from Hickam. The 199th was not federalized during the Korean War, however many of its members volunteered to serve.

The 199th joined the jet age in 1954 when it finally retired its aging Thunderbolts for F-86E Sabre day fighters that were made available after serving in combat over the skies of Korea. The squadron stood runway alert as part of the air defense forces in Hawaii beginning in 1954, having alert pilots in the cockpit from 30 minutes before sunrise to 30 minutes after sunset each day. Beginning in 1958, the squadron received F-86L Sabre Interceptors which could be controlled by Ground Control Interceptor station radar and could operate 24/7/365 in all weather conditions.

On 1 December 1960, the 199th was authorized to expand to a group level, and the 154th Fighter Group was established. The 199th Fighter-Interceptor Squadron becoming the group's flying squadron. Other elements assigned into the group were the 154th headquarters, 154th Material Squadron (Maintenance), 154th Air Base Squadron, and the 154th USAF Dispensary.

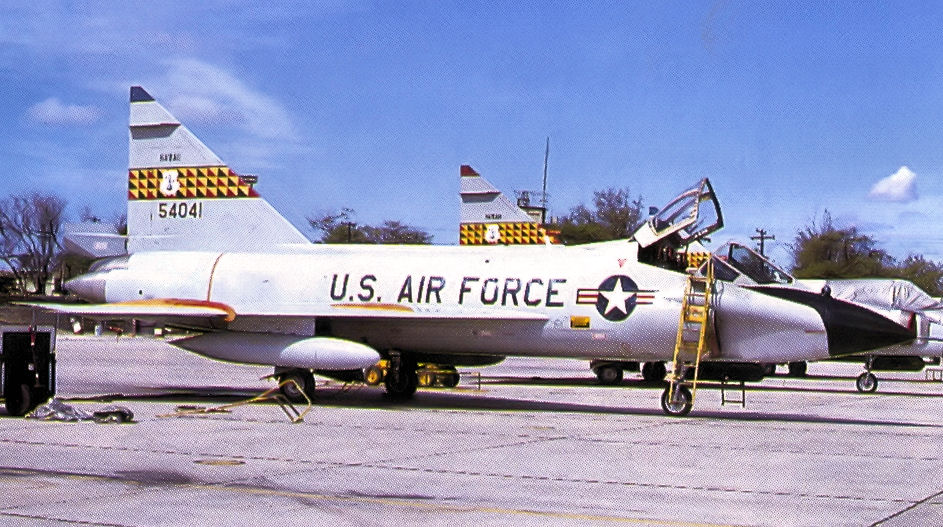
TF-102A Delta Dagger 55-4041, Hawaii ANG, 1964

Along with the change to group status, on 7 December the Hawaiian Air National Guard began receiving Mach-1 F-102 Delta Dagger interceptors eventually 29 F-102s were received. This was in line with the policy of equipping ANG units with one generation of aircraft behind the active-duty Air Defense Command forces. For the next sixteen years, the 154th operated the Delta Daggers establishing an excellent safety record. In December 1961, The new Hawaii Air National Guard complex was completed and consisted of 60 acres. The land was originally part of Fort Kamehameha and had been acquired in 1960 by permit from the U.S. Army to the Hawaii ANG.

The 154th flew the Delta Dagger throughout the 1960s, and although the Hawaii ANG was not activated during the Vietnam War, several of its pilots volunteered for combat duty in Southeast Asia. The group was the longest user of the interceptor, being equipped with the F-102 long after most of its Air National Guard counterparts were upgraded to the F-106.

==== Tactical fighters ====
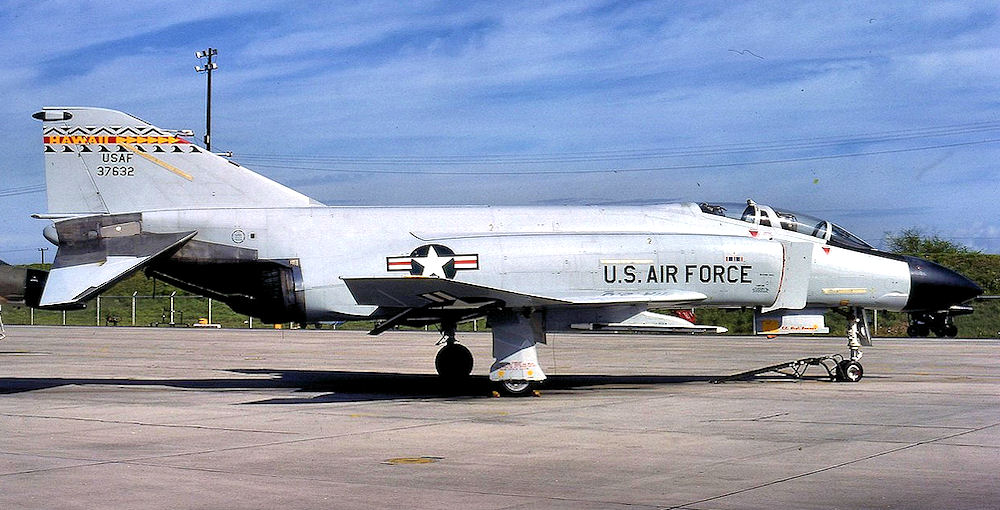
199th Tactical Fighter Squadron F-4C Phantom 63–7632 in Air Defense interceptor markings, 1985.

The last F-102A finally left ANG service in October 1976, when the 199th traded in their Delta Daggers for F-4C Phantom II and the 154th became a tactical fighter group. The F-4C was a workhorse tactical fighter-bomber during the Vietnam War, and could also be used as an effective interceptor. The Hawaii ANG used the Phantom in both roles, employing it during training exercises with Army and Marine units in ground exercises, as well as retaining the standing air defense alert at Hickam. On 3 November 1978, the 154th became a Composite Group with the addition of a C-130A Hercules and a C-7A Caribou flight

After a decade flying the F-4C, the 154th received F-15A Eagles in 1987 along with a twin-seat F-15B trainer as part of the retirement of the F-4 from the Air Force inventory. The F-15As were received from the 21st Tactical Fighter Wing, Elmendorf Air Force Base, Alaska, which was upgrading to the F-15C model. The Eagles received from Alaska had been upgraded though the F-15 Multi-Stage Improvement Program and were used in an air defense mission, which the Hawaii ANG had taken over. In mid-1991, early F-15C versions were received, and the Hawaii ANG operated both the A and C models of the Eagle for the next two decades.

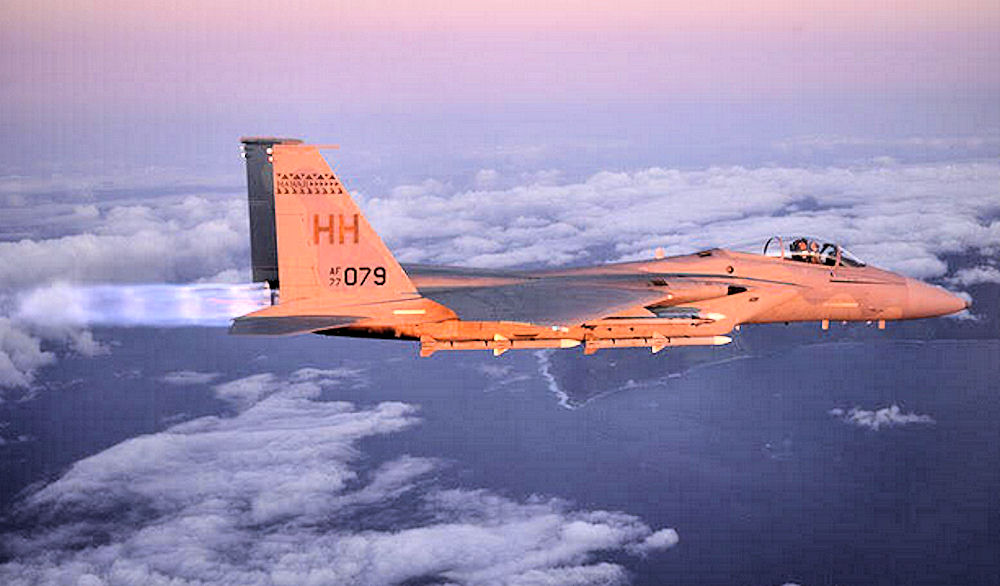
F-15A Eagle 77–0079 in 2000.

In 1989 with inactivation of the PACAF 326th Air Division, the 154th Composite Group took over the air defense radar mission in Hawaii. The 169th Aircraft Control and Warning Squadron began operating a JSS radar site at Mount Kaala, Oahu along with the FAA, and the 150th Aircraft Control and Warning Flight operates a joint-use JSS radar site at Kokee Air Force Station, Kauai. These radar sites are linked to the NORAD Hawaii Region Air Operations Center at Wheeler Army Airfield, Oahu, 21°28′57″N 158°02′45″W. With these two sites, 24/7 air surveillance of the Hawaiian island chain is provided. The 154th Aircraft Control Squadron on Kauai also provides a mobile, self-sustainable, combat ready, forward extension and control element equipped to meet the Air Force's ground theater air control systems.

==== Post Cold War ====
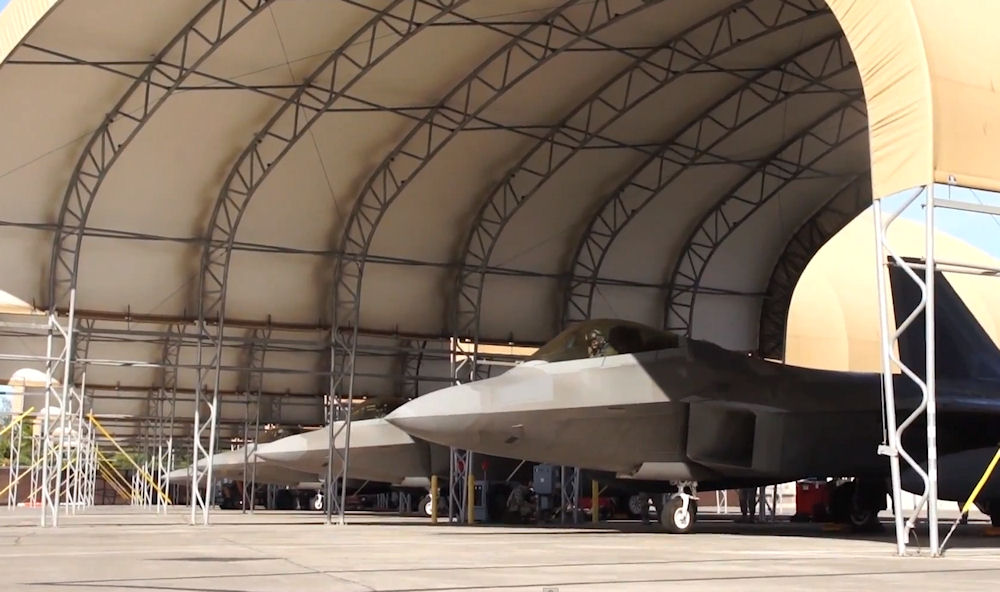
199th Fighter Squadron F-22A Raptors, 2012

In July 2010, the Hawaii Air National Guard welcomed the first of its new inventory of F-22A Raptors. The 154th Wing was the second ANG unit to be equipped with the F-22. The 199th is planned to have 20 aircraft, the initial aircraft being transferred from the 325th Fighter Wing, Tyndall Air Force Base, Florida; the remaining 18 aircraft will come from the 1st Fighter Wing, Langley Air Force Base, Virginia.

The F-22 is designed to counter advanced surface-to-air missile systems and next-generation fighters equipped with launch-and-leave missile capability. The F-15s were sent to the boneyard, the last Eagle leaving in 2011. The 199th operates with the active-duty 19th Fighter Squadron as their cadre unit, although the Hawaii ANG is responsible for seventy-five percent of the mission configuration. This is the first time an Air National Guard unit, the 199th Fighter Squadron, has taken the position of only having an active duty squadron as a cadre flying unit.

== Lineage ==
- Constituted as the 464th Fighter Squadron on 5 October 1944

Activated on 12 October 1944
Inactivated on 27 May 1946

- Redesignated 199th Fighter Squadron, Single Engine and allotted to the National Guard on 24 May 1946.

Received federal recognition and activated on 4 November 1946
Redesignated 199th Fighter-Bomber Squadron on 15 July 1952
Redesignated 199th Fighter-Interceptor Squadron on 19 November 1952
Redesignated 199th Tactical Fighter Squadron on 10 June 1976
Redesignated 199th Fighter Squadron on 15 March 1992

=== Assignments ===
- 507th Fighter Group, 12 October 1944 – 27 May 1946
- Hawaii National Guard, 4 November 1946

Gained by Seventh Air Force
Gained by Pacific Air Command, 15 December 1947
Gained by Far East Air Forces, 1 June 1949
Gained by Seventh Air Force, 5 January 1955
Gained by Pacific Air Forces, 1 July 1957

- 154th Fighter-Interceptor Group (later 154th Tactical Fighter Group, 154th Composite Group, 154th Group), 1 December 1960
- 154th Operations Group, 1 October 1995 – present

=== Stations ===
- Bruning Army Air Field, Nebraska, 20 October 1944
- Dalhart Army Air Field, Texas, 15 December 1944 – 30 April 1945
- Ie Shima Airfield, Ryuku Islands, 24 June 1945
- Yontan Airfield, Okinawa, 29 January-27 May 1946
- Bellows Field. Hawaii, 4 November 1946
- Hickam Field (later Hickam Air Force Base, Joint Base Pearl Harbor–Hickam), Hawaii, 28 October 1947

=== Aircraft ===
- P-47N (later F-47N) Thunderbolt, 1944–1945, 1947–1954
- F-86E Sabre, 1954–1958
- F-86L Sabre, 1958–1961
- F-102A Delta Dagger, 1960–1976
- F-4C Phantom II, 1976–1987
- F-15A/B Eagle, 1987–2009
- F-15C Eagle, 1991–2010
- F-22A Raptor, 2010 – present
