= 96th Air Refueling Squadron =

US Air Force unit

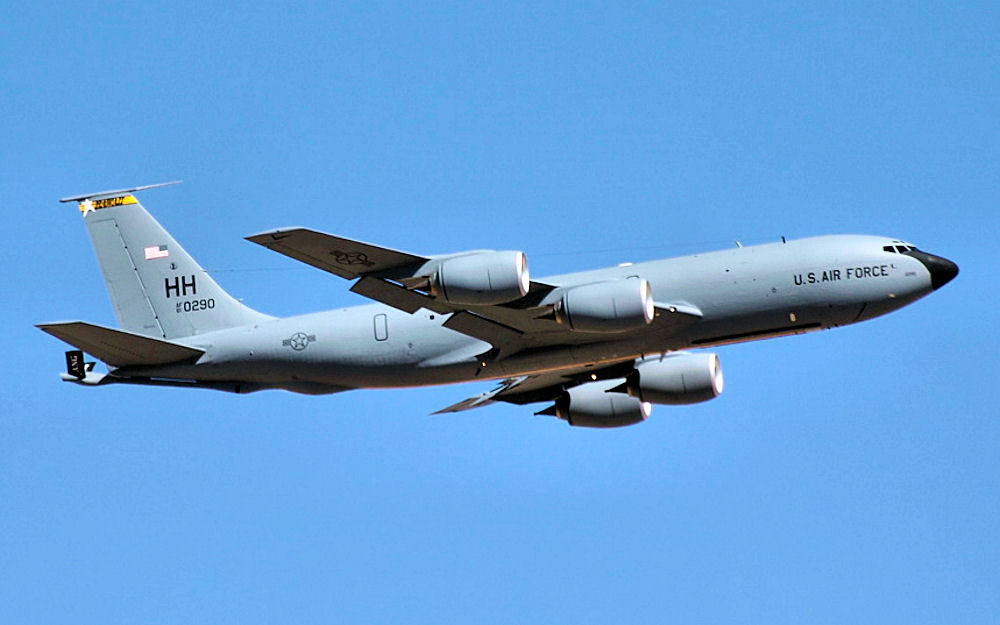
- KC-135 Stratotanker flown by 96th and 203d Air Refueling Squadrons (Note: Aircraft is Boeing KC-135R-BN Stratotanker serial 61-290.)
- Active: 1941–1946; 1953–1960; 1960–1965; 1994–2005; 2010-2015
- Country: United States
- Branch: United States Air Force
- Role: Aerial refueling
- Motto: Ubique (Latin for 'Everywhere'))
- Decorations: Distinguished Unit Citation; Air Force Meritorious Unit Award; Air Force Outstanding Unit Award

Insignia
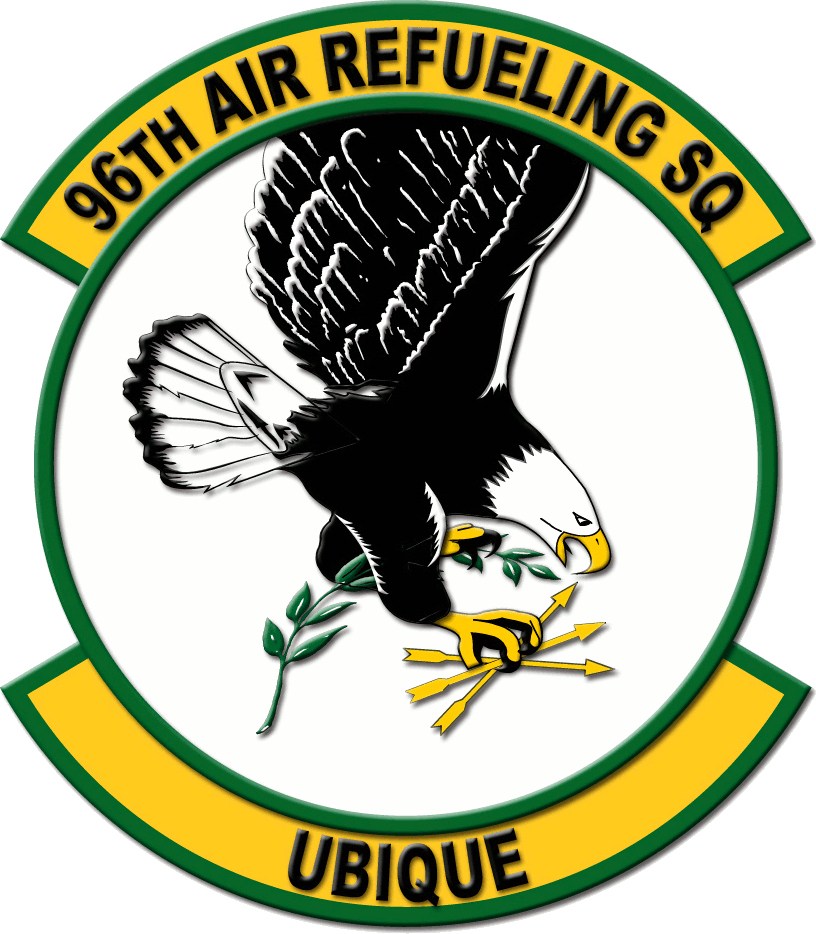
- 96th Air Refueling Squadron emblem (Note: Approved 9 December 1994. Description: Argent, an eagle descending Sable, tail and head of the first [color], beak and feet Or, grasping in dexter talon an olive branch Vert and in sinister talon a sheaf of three arrows Yellow, all within a diminished border of the fourth [color].)

- First 96th Air Refueling Squadron emblem (Note: Approved 19 June 1956.)

- 396th Bombardment Squadron emblem

- 6th Reconnaissance Squadron emblem

The first predecessor of the 96th Air Refueling Squadron was activated in California as the 6th Reconnaissance Squadron. Following the Japanese attack on Pearl Harbor, the squadron began flying antisubmarine patrols off the Pacific Coast as it trained and prepared for overseas deployment. In the fall of 1943, it moved to the Pacific, participating in combat as the 396th Bombardment Squadron until V-J Day, earning a Distinguished Unit Citation. It was inactivated in the Philippines in 1946.

The second predecessor of the squadron was activated in 1953, refueling Strategic Air Command bombers and maintaining aircraft on alert status until inactivating in 1965. It was active again from 1994 to 2005 as a unit of Air Mobility Command

From 2010 to 2015, the squadron was an active duty associate of the 203rd Air Refueling Squadron of the Hawaii Air National Guard

== History ==
=== World War II ===
==== Organization and antisubmarine operations ====
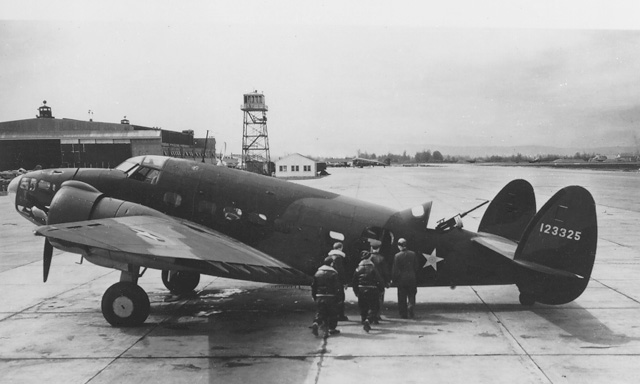
A-29 Hudson as flown by the squadron

The first predecessor of the squadron was the 6th Reconnaissance Squadron, which was activated on 15 January 1941 at March Field, California and equipped in May with mix of Douglas B-18 Bolo, Lockheed A-29 Hudson, and Consolidated LB-30 Liberator aircraft. Since September 1936, a long range reconnaissance squadron, like the 6th, was attached to each bombardment group, and the squadron was attached to the 41st Bombardment Group. The squadron moved with the 41st Group to Davis-Monthan Field, Arizona in May.

The day after the Japanese attack on Pearl Harbor, the squadron moved to Muroc Army Airfield, California, and began flying antisubmarine patrols off the California Coast. It moved its base of operations to Sacramento Municipal Airport, California in early January 1942, and operated from Naval Air Station Alameda, California between April and May 1942. After June 1942, it sent a detachment to Marine Corps Air Station Cherry Point, North Carolina, from which it conducted patrols over the Atlantic. In February 1942, the squadron's attachment to the 41st Group became an assignment, and three months later, it became the 396th Bombardment Squadron.

The squadron moved to Hammer Field, California in late August 1942 to begin training with North American B-25 Mitchells for overseas deployment. However, its training was interrupted in December, when it resumed antisubmarine patrols, again operating from Sacramento and Alameda. These operations continued until February 1943, although operations from Sacramento continued until late September when the squadron deployed to the Pacific.

==== Combat in the Pacific ====
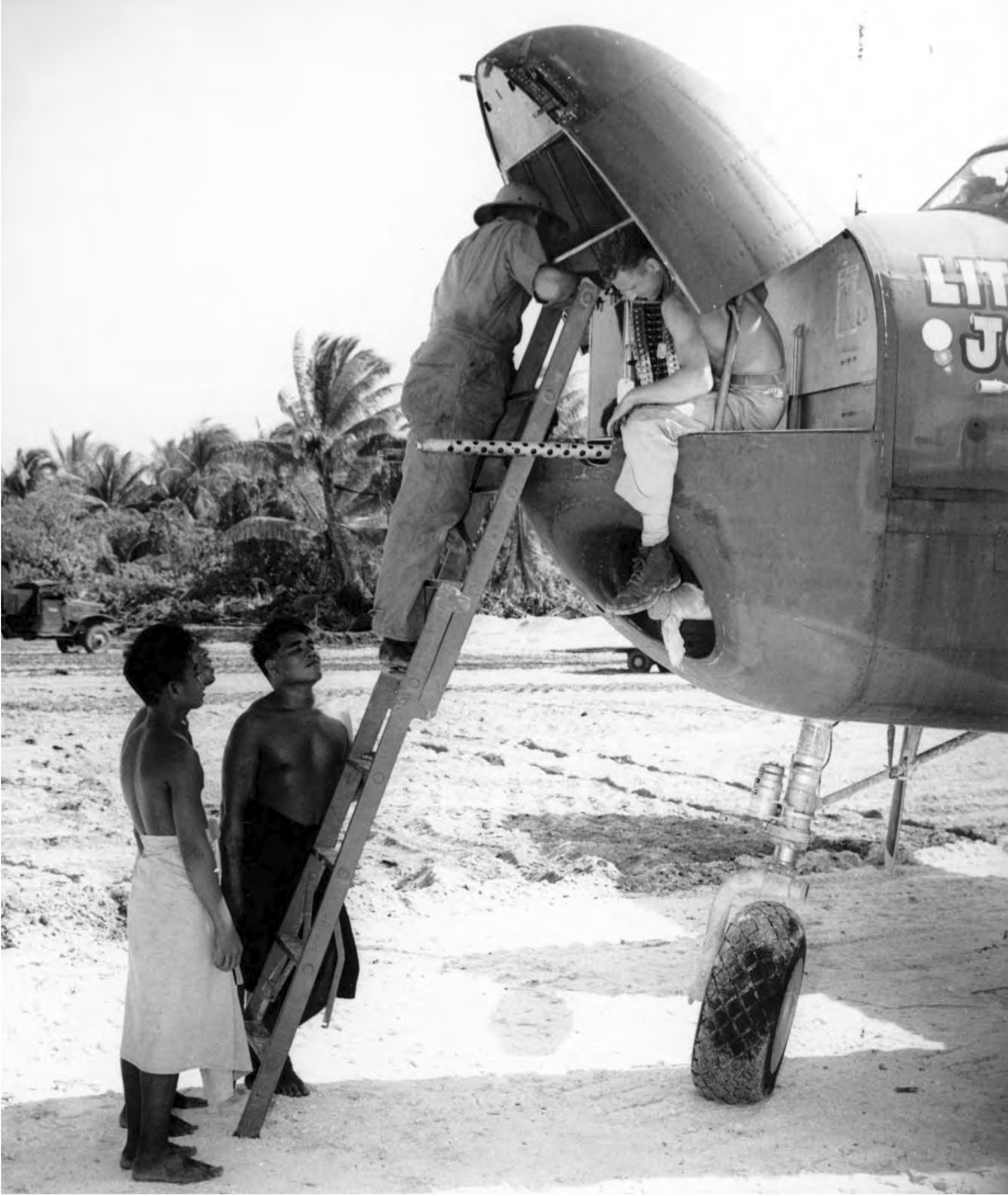
Maintenance on a 41st Bombardment Group B-25 at Hawkins Field

The squadron sailed on the SS President Taylor to Hickam Field, Hawaii, where it completed its training before deploying to Hawkins Field on Tarawa in December, to begin combat operations. It attacked Japanese airfields, military installations and shipping to prepare for the American invasion of the Marshall Islands. Starting in February 1944, it staged through captured fields on Eniwetok to attack shipping in the Caroline Islands. It moved to Makin Airfield in the Gilbert Islands in April, continuing its attacks in the Marshalls and Carolins, focusing on shipping near islands that had been bypassed by amphibious forces.

It returned to Hawaii in October 1944, where it received new B-25 Michells and trained with rockets and performed defensive patrols. It deployed to Okinawa in June 1945. It bombed airfields, railroads and harbor facilities on Kyushu.. The attacks on shipping in harbors included experimental use of glide bombs. It also attacked targets on the coast of China. From 4 April 1945 to 14 July 1945, the squadron began the first sustained medium bomber strikes against the main islands of Japan. It established its facilities and operated its aircraft under the most hazardous field conditions. Despite adverse weather and heavy enemy artillery shelling and repeated day and night aerial bombing of its hom base, the unit flew reconnaissance and search missions, escort missions, day and night bomber strikes. For its role in the Okinawa Campaign, the squadron was awarded a Distinguished Unit Citation. (Note: Maurer in Combat Squadrons or in Combat Units does not list this award for the 396th Squadron or the 41st Group. AF Pamphlet 900-2 lists the award for the 41st Group, but not the squadron. Endicott lists it for the squadron.)

Following V-J Day, the squadron continued to fly training missions. Drawdowon of the unit began in September, and by October, most of the unit's veterans had returned to the United States, and by November, the remaining members of the squadron were acting as a service unit for other units at Machinato Airfield. It remained on Okinawa until December 1945, when its remaining personnel transferred to Fort William McKinley, Philippines, where it was inactivated on 27 January 1946.

=== Cold War ===
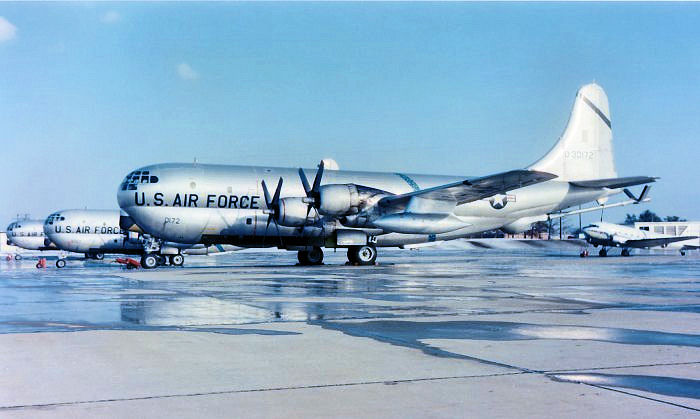
KC-97G Stratofreighter as flown by the squadron

The 96th Air Refueling Squadron was activated at Altus Air Force Base, Oklahoma in November 1953 and assigned to the 96th Bombardment Wing. It began refueling operations with Boeing KC-97 Stratofreighters in March 1954. The squadron's first deployment was to Ernest Harmon Air Force Base, Newfoundland, where it was attached to Northeast Air Command (NEAC) from October November 1954. It was also attached to NEAC for deployments to Thule Air Force Base, Greenland between August and September 1955 and in January 1956. Later in 1956, part of the squadron deployed to Elmendorf Air Force Base, Alaska, where it was attached to Alaskan Air Command, while the remainder of the unit was attached to the 303d Bombardment Wing at Andersen Air Force Base, Guam.

In September 1957, the 96th Wing moved to Dyess Air Force Base, Texas, but the squadron remained at Altus and was reassigned to the 11th Bombardment Wing when the 11th Wing moved to Altus on 3 December 1957. In 1958, the 11th Wing began to equip with Boeing B-52 Stratofortresses and the squadron converted to the Boeing KC-135A Stratotanker. In 1958, the squadron began to comply with General Thomas S. Power's initial goal of maintaining one third of Strategic Air Command (SAC)’s planes on fifteen minute ground alert, fully fueled and ready for combat to reduce vulnerability to a Soviet missile strike.

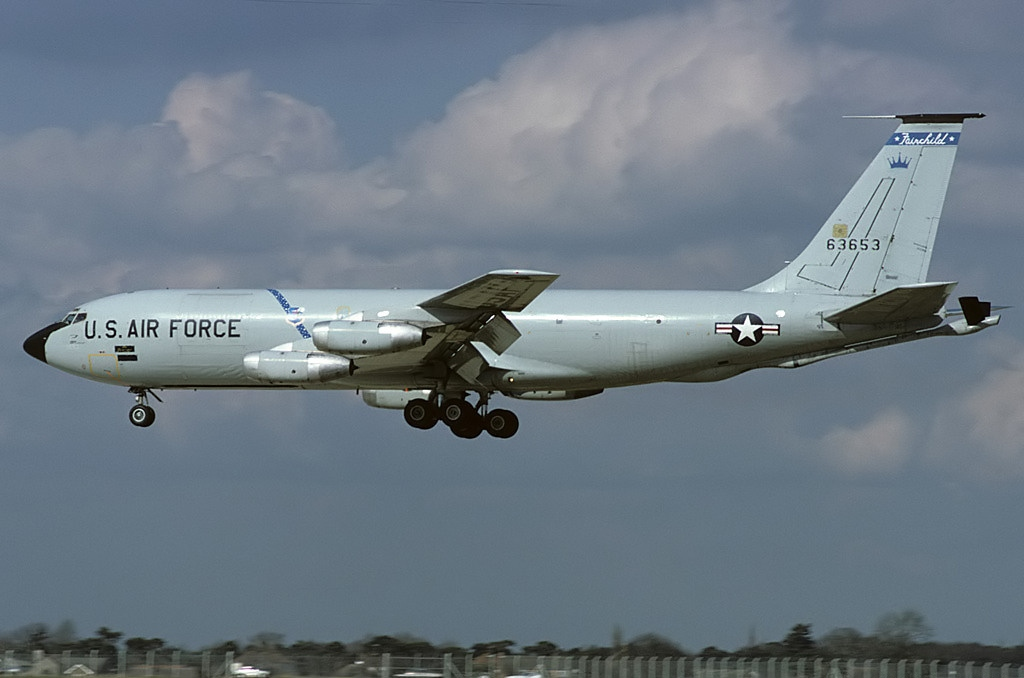
KC-135A Stratotankerof the 92nd Wing in SAC markings

In October 1960, the squadron was discontinued and provided the cadre for the 918th and 921st Air Refueling Squadrons, which were organized for later transfer to other bases. However, this action was reversed in December and the squadron was again organized in at Altus from the same resources. The squadron's alert commitment was increased to half the squadron's aircraft in 1962.

Soon after detection of Soviet missiles in Cuba, SAC brought all degraded and adjusted alert sorties up to full capability. Additional squadron KC-135s were placed on alert to replace KC-135s devoted to maintaining 1/8 of the B-52 bomber force on airborne alert. On 24 October SAC went to DEFCON 2, placing all the squadron's aircraft on alert, and increased the number of tankers in the Tanker Task Forces in Spain, Alaska and the Northeast. On 21 November, SAC went to DEFCON 3 and on 27 November SAC returned to normal alert posture.

The squadron was discontinued and inactivated on 25 June 1965, and its mission, personnel and aircraft were transferred to the 11th Air Refueling Squadron, which transferred on paper to Altus from Dover Air Force Base, Delaware.

=== Air Mobility Command ===
The squadrons wer consolidated in 1985, although the conslidated unit was not active. As Air Mobility Command (AMC) aligned its air refueling assets, it activated the squadron at Fairchild Air Force Base in April 1994 and assigned it to AMC's 453d Operations Group. On 1 July, the 92nd Bomb Wing was redesignated as the 92nd Air Refueling Wing and transferred from Air Combat Command to AMC, and the 96th Squadron was reassigned to its 92nd Operations Group. The squadron conducted air refueling operations with Boeing KC-135R Stratotankers. Squadron members and aircraft deployed to bases in Saudi Arabia, Qatar and Kyrgyzstan and flew missions over Iraq and Afghanistan. It deployed to Andersen Air Force Base during late 2004. Members of the 96th brought the first relief crews into Thailand after the 2004 Indian Ocean earthquake and tsunami.

The squadron was inactivated in March 2005, as the Air Force restructured Fairchild's refueling units from four squadrons of between 70 and 80 people to two squadrons with about 140 people, leaving only the 92nd and 93rd Air Refueling Squadrons active.

=== Associate unit ===
The 96th was reactivated on 23 July 2010 at Joint Base Pearl Harbor–Hickam and assigned to the 15th Operations Group of Pacific Air Forces, due to increasing requirments for air refueling in the Pacific area. It was an active associate of the 203rd Air Refueling Squadron of the Hawaii Air National Guard as a "Total Force Integration" partnership.

The squadron participated in Operations Enduring Freedom, Inherent Resolve, and Noble Eagle; as well as multiple exercises. In addition, the unit flew numerous aeromedical evacuation missions and supported movement of the President of the United States throughout the Pacific region. It was inactivated on 3 September 2015.

== Lineage ==
396th Bombardment Squadron

- Constituted as the 6th Reconnaissance Squadron (Medium) on 20 November 1940

Activated on 15 January 1941
Redesignated 396th Bombardment Squadron (Medium) on 22 April 1942
Redesignated 396th Bombardment Squadron, Medium c. 9 May 1943
Inactivated on 27 January 1946

- Consolidated with the 96th Air Refueling Squadron as the 96th Air Refueling Squadron on 19 September 1985

96th Air Refueling Squadron

- Constituted as the 96th Air Refueling Squadron, Medium on 6 November 1953

Activated on 18 November 1953
Redesignated 96th Air Refueling Squadron, Heavy on 8 March 1958
Discontinued on 1 October 1960
Organized on 15 December 1960
Discontinued and inactivated on 25 June 1965
Redesignated 96th Air Refueling Squadron and activated on 1 April 1994
Inactivated on 31 March 2005
Activated on 23 July 2010
Inactivated on 30 September 2015

=== Assignments ===
- 1st Bombardment Wing (attached to 41st Bombardment Group), 15 January 1941
- 41st Bombardment Group, 25 February 1942 – 27 January 1946
- 96th Bombardment Wing, 18 November 1953 (attached to Northeast Air Command, 5 October – 20 November 1954, 1 August – 14 September 1955, 18–31 January 1956, Alaskan Air Command and 303d Bombardment Wing, 25 June-9 October 1956 (split deployment), 98th Air Base Group, 10 January – 7 April 1957)
- 11th Bombardment Wing, 3 December 1957 – 1 October 1960
- 11th Bombardment Wing (later 11th Strategic Aerospace Wing), 15 December 1960 – 25 June 1965
- 453d Operations Group, 1 April 1994
- 92d Operations Group, 1 July 1994 – 31 March 2005
- 15th Operations Group, 23 July 2010 – 30 September 2015

=== Stations ===
- March Field, California, 15 January 1941
- Davis-Monthan Field, Arizona, 16 May 1941
- Muroc Army Air Field, California, 8 December 1941
- Sacramento Municipal Airport, California, c. 11 January 1942 (operated from NAS Alameda, California, April-10 May 1942 and a detachment of the air echelon operated from MCAS Cherry Point, North Carolina, June–August 1942)
- Hammer Field, California, 24 August 1942 (stationed temporarily at NAS Alameda, California, 1 December 1942 – February 1943 and Sacramento Municipal Airport, California, 17 February – 29 September 1943)
- Hickam Field, Hawaii, 20 October 1943
- Hawkins Field, Tarawa, Gilbert Islands, 24 December 1943
- Makin Airfield, Gilbert Islands, 20 April 1944
- Wheeler Field, Hawaii, 14 October 1944 – 20 May 1945
- Yontan Airfield, Okinawa, 7 June 1945
- Fort William McKinley, Philippines, December 1945 – 27 January 1946
- Altus Air Force Base, Oklahoma, 18 November 1953 – 1 October 1960 (deployed to Ernest Harmon Air Force Base, Newfoundland, 5 October – 20 November 1954, Thule Air Force Base, Greenland, 1 August – 14 September 1955 and 18–31 January 1956, Elmendorf Air Force Base, Alaska and Andersen Air Force Base, Guam, 25 June-9 October 1956)
- Altus Air Force Base, Oklahoma, 15 December 1960 – 25 June 1965
- Fairchild Air Force Base, Washington, 1 April 1994 – 31 March 2005
- Joint Base Pearl Harbor–Hickam, Hawaii, 23 July 2010 – 30 September 2015

=== Aircraft ===
- Stearman PT-17 Kaydet (1941)
- Douglas B-18 Bolo (1941–1942)
- Lockheed A-29 Hudson (1941–1942)
- Consolidated LB-30 Liberator (1941–1942)
- North American B-25 Mitchell (1942–1945)
- Boeing KC-97 Stratofreighter (1954–1958)
- Boeing KC-135 Stratotanker (1958–1960, 1960–1965, 1994–2005, 2010-2015

=== Awards and campaigns ===
Award streamer	Award	Dates	Notes
	Presidential Unit Citation	4 April–14 July 1945	Japan, 396th Bombardment Squadron
	Air Force Meritorious Unit Award	1 June 2003–31 March 2005	96th Air Refueling Squadron
	Air Force Outstanding Unit Award	6 August 1954–15 July 1957	96th Air Refueling Squadron
	Air Force Outstanding Unit Award	27 October 1958–16 September 1960	96th Air Refueling Squadron
	Air Force Outstanding Unit Award	1 July 1995–30 June 1997	96th Air Refueling Squadron
	Air Force Outstanding Unit Award	1 January 1998–30 June 1999	96th Air Refueling Squadron
	Air Force Outstanding Unit Award	1 June 2001–31 May 2003	96th Air Refueling Squadron

Campaign Streamer	Campaign	Dates	Notes
	Antisubmarine	c. 11 January 1942–24 August 1942, 1 September 1942–1 August 1943	6th Reconnaissance Squadron (later 396th Bombardment Squadron)
	Eastern Mandates	24 December 1943–14 April 1944	396th Bombardment Squadron
	Air Offensive, Japan	17 April 1945–2 September 1945	396th Bombardment Squadron
	Western Pacific	17 April 1945–2 September 1945	396th Bombardment Squadron
	Ryukus	7 June 1945–2 July 1945	396th Bombardment Squadron
	China Offensive	7 June 1945–2 September 1945	396th Bombardment Squadron

== See also ==
- List of United States Air Force air refueling squadrons
