= 154th Wing =

United States Airforce reserve unit and aerial unit in the Hawaii National Guard

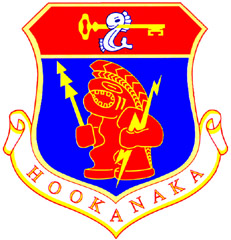
154th Wing

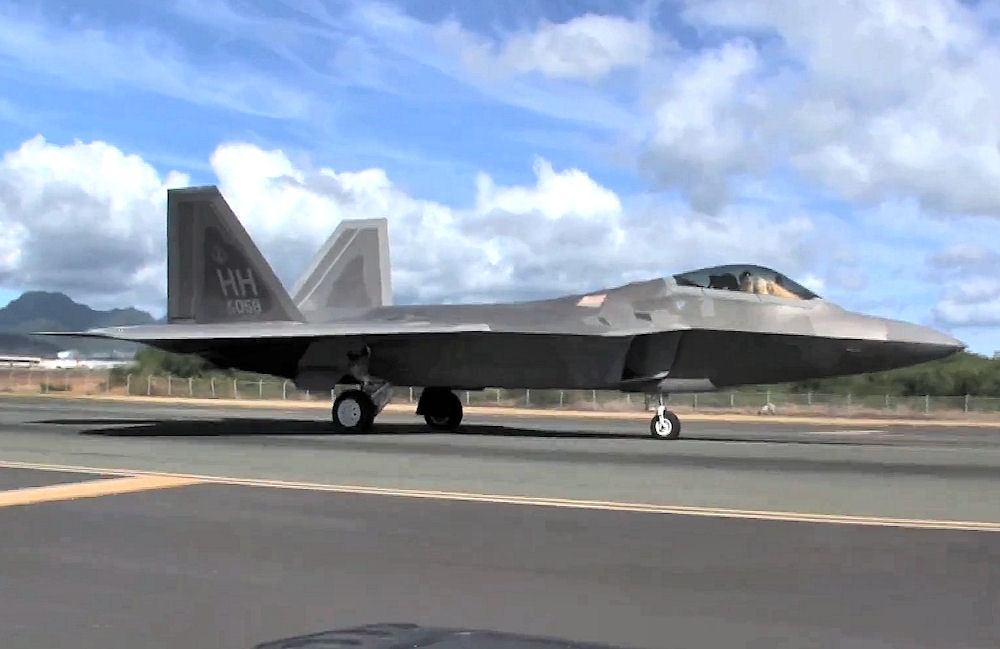
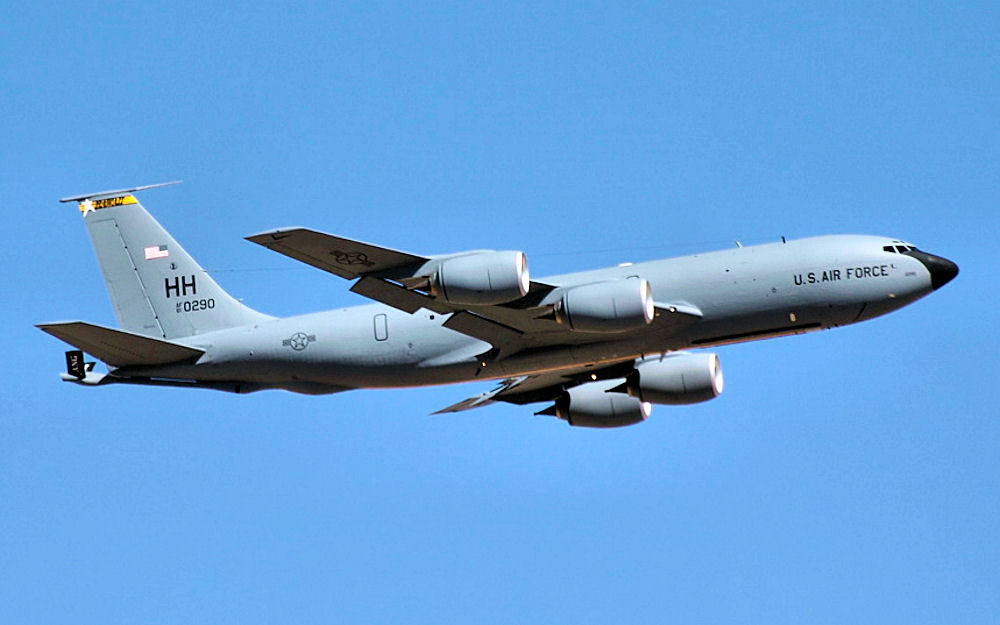
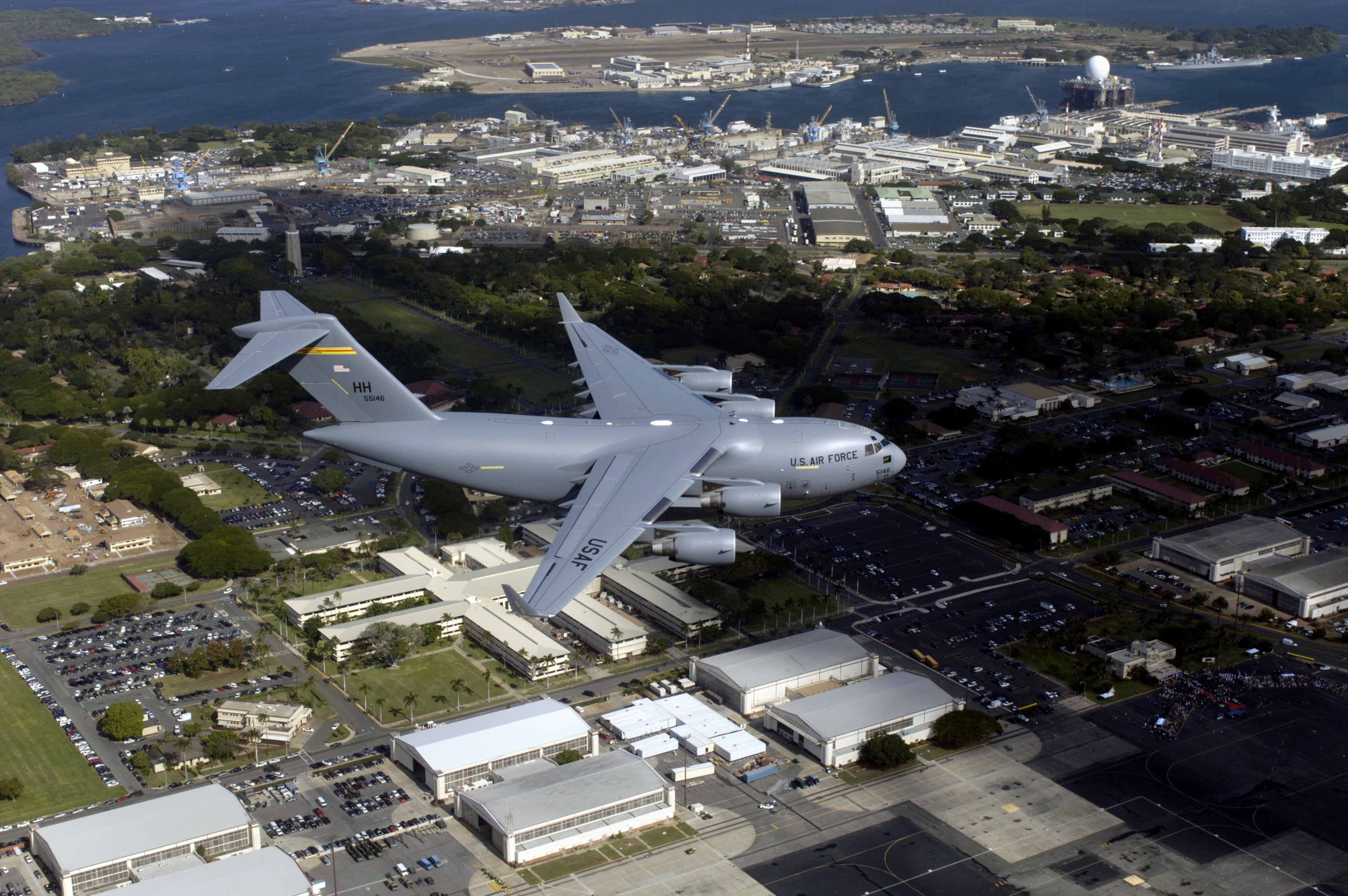
- 199th Fighter Squadron F-22A Raptor (Note: Aircraft is Lockheed Martin F-22A Lot 3 Block 20 Raptor, serial 03-4058.) 203d Air Refueling Squadron - KC-135R Stratotanker 61-0290 204th Airlift Squadron C-17 Globemaster III flying over Hickam Air Force Base
- Active: 1 December 1960-Present
- Country: United States
- Allegiance: Hawaii
- Branch: Air National Guard
- Type: Wing
- Role: Fighter, airlift, air refueling
- Part of: Hawaii Air National Guard
- Garrison/HQ: Joint Base Pearl Harbor–Hickam, Hawaii
- Motto: Hookanaka (Hawaiian for 'Humankind')
- Decorations: Air Force Outstanding Unit Award

Commanders
- Commander: Brigadier General Kristof K. Sills
- Vice Commander: Colonel Regina H. Komine
- Command Chief: CMSgt Kurt K. Uchimura

Insignia
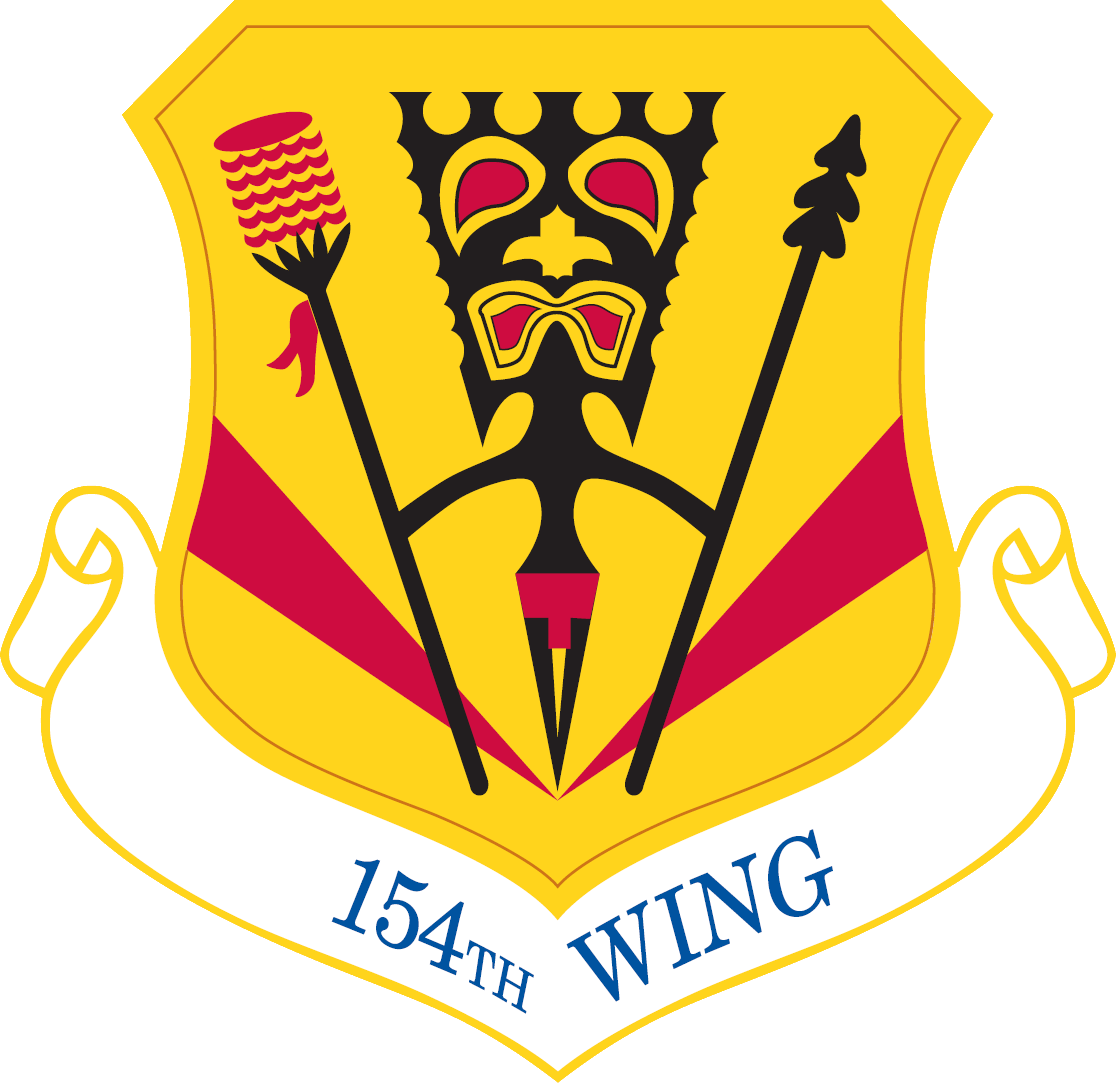
- 154th Wing emblem
- Tail code: HH
- Tail flash

Aircraft flown
- Fighter: F-22A Raptor
- Transport: C-17 Globemaster III
- Tanker: KC-135R Stratotanker

The 154th Wing is a unit of the Hawaii Air National Guard, stationed at Hickam Air Force Base, Joint Base Pearl Harbor–Hickam, Honolulu, Hawaii. If activated to federal service, the Wing is placed under the command of the Pacific Air Forces.

== Overview ==
The 154th Wing is the major operational component of the Hawaii Air National Guard. The 154th is both a composite wing, consisting of air supremacy, airlift, radar, and air refueling squadrons, and in certain instances an associate unit with the USAF Pacific Air Forces' 15th Wing.

In performing its state mission, the Hawaii ANG provides organized, trained units to protect Hawaii's citizens and property, preserve peace, and ensure public safety in response to natural or human-caused disasters. The federal mission of the Hawaii ANG is to provide operationally ready combat units, combat support units, and qualified personnel for active duty in the U.S. Air Force in time of war, national emergency, or operational contingency.

== Units ==
The major components of the 154th Wing are:

- 154th Operations Group

199th Fighter Squadron (F-22A Raptor)
203rd Air Refueling Squadron (KC-135R Stratotanker)
204th Airlift Squadron (C-17 Globemaster III)

- 154th Maintenance Group
- 154th Mission Support Group
- 154th Medical Group
- 169th Aircraft Control and Warning Squadron (GSU at Mount Kaala, Oahu) 21°30′27″N 158°08′31″W

Designated as Joint Surveillance System station "H-01"; ARSR-4 Radar; Joint-use site between HI ANG and FAA.

- 150th Aircraft Control and Warning Flight (GSU at Kōkeʻe Air Force Station, Kauai) 169 ACWS OL-AA 22°08′52″N 159°38′42″W

Located atop Mount Kōkeʻe. Designated as Joint Surveillance System station "H-02"; AN/FPS-117v4 Radar; Joint-use site between HI ANG and FAA.

== History ==
On 1 December 1960, the Hawaii Air National Guard 199th Fighter-Interceptor Squadron was authorized to expand to a group level, and the 157th Fighter-Interceptor Group was established by the National Guard Bureau. The 199th FIS becoming the group's flying squadron. Other squadrons assigned into the group were the 157th Headquarters, 157th Material Squadron (Maintenance), 157th Combat Support Squadron, and the 157th USAF Dispensary.

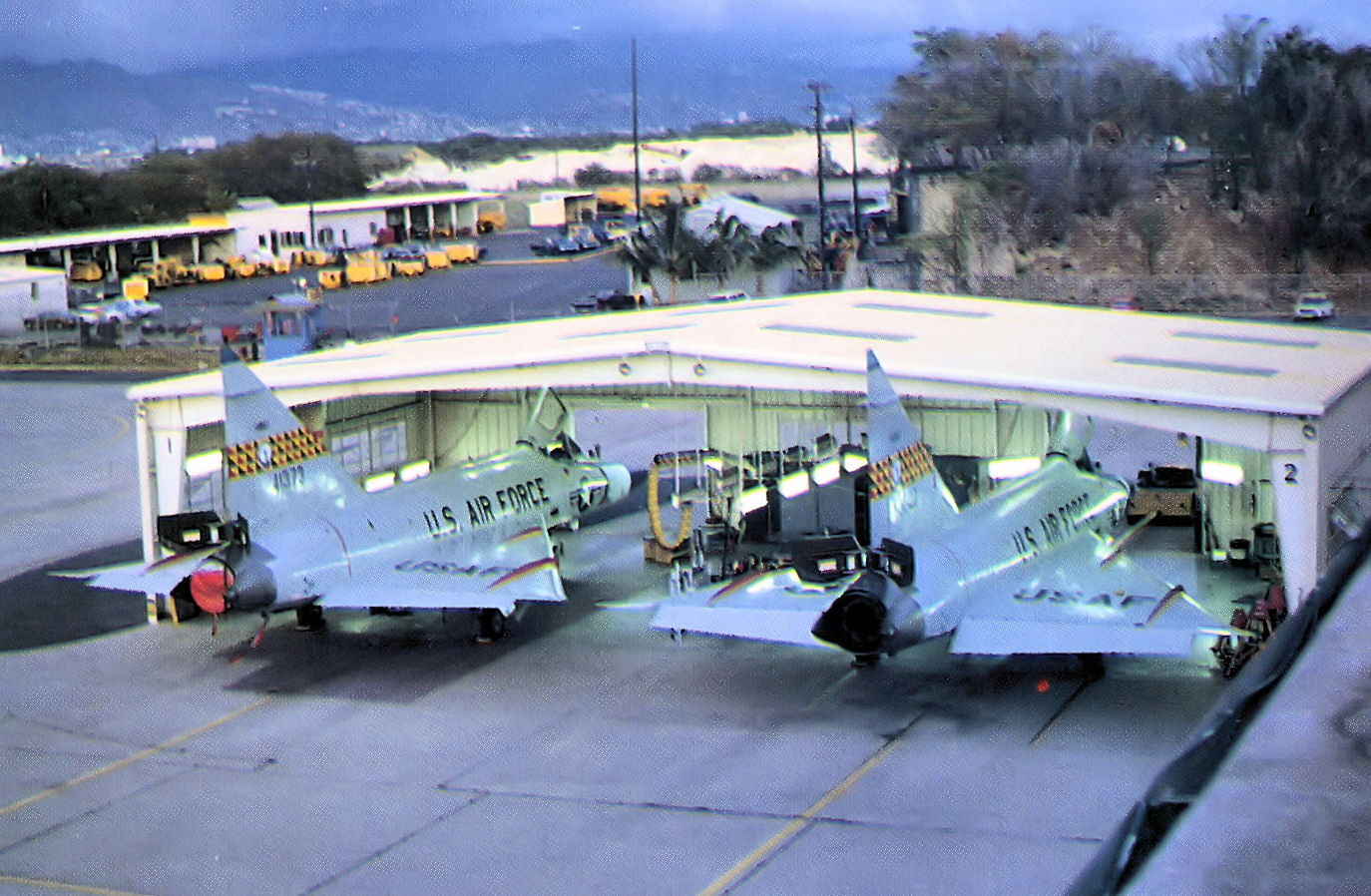
199th FIS F-102s in a nose dock at Hickam AFB, 1976

The 199th FIG F-86L Sabre Interceptors were upgraded to F-102A Delta Dagger interceptors, the mission of the 154th FIW is the air defense of Hawaii. Eventually 29 F-102s were received. This was in line with the policy of equipping ANG units with one generation of aircraft behind the active-duty Air Defense Command forces. For the next sixteen years, the 157th FIG operated the Delta Daggers establishing an excellent safety record. In December 1961, The new Hawaii Air National Guard (HANG) complex was completed and consisted of 60 acres. The land was originally part of Fort Kamehameha and had been acquired in 1960 by permit from the U.S. Army to the Hawaii ANG.

The 157th flew the Delta Dagger throughout the 1960s, and although the Hawaii ANG was not activated during the Vietnam War, several of its pilots volunteered for combat duty in Southeast Asia. The group was the longest user of the interceptor, being equipped with the F-102 long after most of its Air National Guard counterparts were upgraded to the F-106.

=== Tactical fighters ===
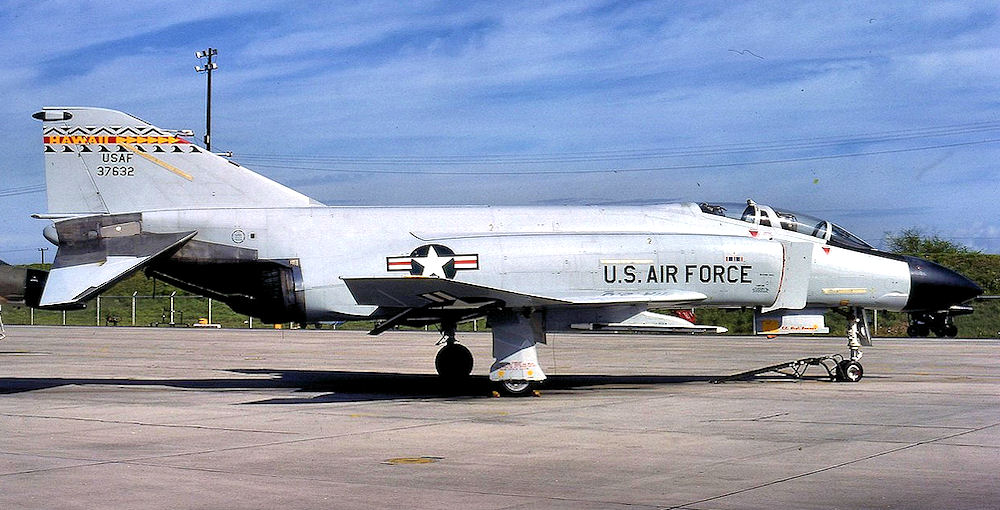
199th Tactical Fighter Squadron F-4C Phantom 63-7632 in Air Defense interceptor markings.

The last F-102A finally left ANG service in October 1976, when the 199th FIS of the Hawaii ANG traded in their Delta Daggers for F-4C Phantom II and the 157th became a Tactical Fighter Group. The F-4C was a workhorse tactical fighter-bomber during the Vietnam War, and could also be used as an effective interceptor. The Hawaii ANG used the Phantom in both roles, employing it during training exercises with Army and Marine units in ground exercises, as well as retaining the standing air defense alert at Hickam. On 3 November 1978, the 154th became a Composite Group with the addition of a C-130A Hercules and a C-7A Caribou flight.

After a decade flying the F-4C, the 157th received F-15A Eagles in 1987 along with a twin-seat F-15B trainer as part of the retirement of the F-4 from the Air Force inventory.

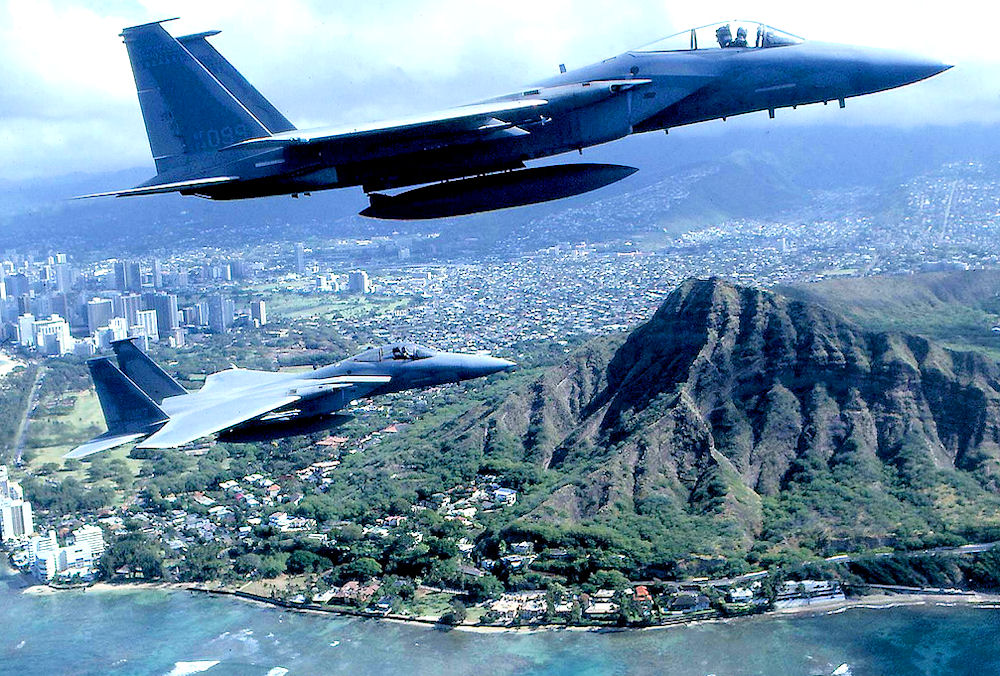
199th Fighter Squadron - F-15 Eagles over Hawaii

The F-15As were received from the 21st Tactical Fighter Wing, Elmendorf AFB, Alaska, which was upgrading to the F-15C model. The Eagles received from Alaska had been upgraded through the F-15 Multi-Stage Improvement Program (MSIP) and were used in an air defense mission, which the Hawaii ANG had taken over. In mid-1991, early F-15C versions were received, and the Hawaii ANG operated both the A and C models of the Eagle for the next two decades.

In 1989 with inactivation of the PACAF 326th Air Division, the 154th Composite Group took over the air defense Radar mission in Hawaii. The 169th Aircraft Control and Warning Squadron began operating a JSS radar site at Mount Kaala, Oahu along with the FAA, and the 150th Aircraft Control and Warning Flight operates a joint-use JSS radar site at Kokee Air Force Station, Kauai. These radar sites are linked to the NORAD Hawaii Region Air Operations Center (HIRAOC) at Wheeler Army Airfield, Oahu, 21°28′57″N 158°02′45″W. With these two sites, 24/7 air surveillance of the Hawaiian island chain is provided. The 154th Aircraft Control Squadron on Kauai also provides a mobile, self-sustainable, combat ready, forward extension and control element equipped to meet the Air Force's ground theater air control systems.

=== Post Cold War ===
In March 1992, with the end of the Cold War, the 154th adopted the Air Force Objective Organization plan, and the unit was re-designated as the 154th Group. In January 1993, the 203d Air Refueling Squadron was recognized and activated by the National Guard Bureau. The 203d assumed the rotating deployments of KC-135s to Hickam which started in the 1970s by SAC-gained stateside Air National Guard squadrons. On 1 August 1994 the C-130 flight was expanded and the 204th Airlift Squadron was recognized and activated by the National Guard Bureau, eventually transitioning from the C-130A to the C-130H2..

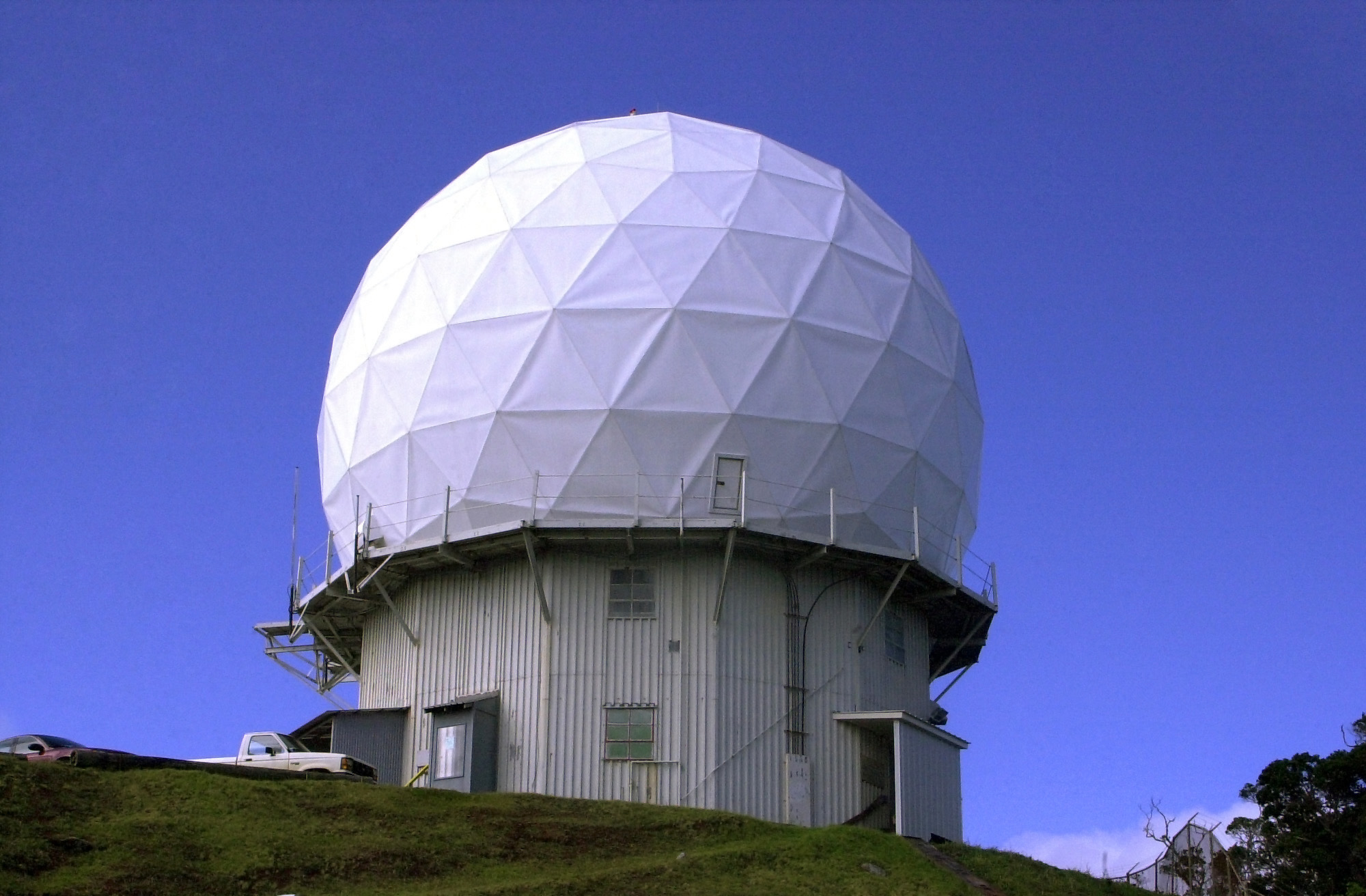
AN/FPS-117 search radar at Kokee AFS.

In 1995, in accordance with the Air Force "One Base-One Wing" directive, the 154th was changed in status to a Wing, and the 199th Fighter Squadron was assigned to the new 154th Operations Group.

In 2006, the 204th Airlift Squadron began transitioning from the C-130 to the C-17 Globemaster III.

In July 2010, the Hawaii Air National Guard welcomed the first of its new inventory of F-22A Raptors. The 154th Wing was the second ANG unit to be equipped with the F-22. The 199th is planned to have 20 aircraft, the initial aircraft being transferred from the 325th Fighter Wing, Tyndall Air Force Base, Florida; the remaining 18 aircraft will come from the 1st Fighter Wing, Langley Air Force Base, Virginia.

The F-22 is designed to counter advanced surface-to-air missile systems and next-generation fighters equipped with launch-and-leave missile capability. The F-15s were sent to the CONUS, the last Eagle leaving in 2011. The 199th operates active-duty 19th Fighter Squadron as an associate unit, although the Hawaii ANG is responsible for seventy-five percent of the mission configuration. This is the first time an Air National Guard unit, the 199th Fighter Squadron, has taken the position of lead squadron in an associate flying unit arrangement with the active duty Air Force.

== Lineage ==
- Established as the 154th Fighter Group (Air Defense) on 24 June 1960 and allotted to the National Guard Bureau

Received federal recognition and activated on 1 December 1960

" Redesignated 154th Fighter-Interceptor Group c. January 1972

Redesignated 154th Tactical Fighter Group on 10 June 1976
Redesignated 154th Composite Group on 3 November 1978
Redesignated 154th Group on 15 March 1992
Redesignated 154th Wing on 1 October 1995

=== Assignments ===
- Hawaii Air National Guard, 1 December 1960

Gained by: Pacific Air Forces

=== Stations ===
- Hickam Air Force Base, Honolulu, Hawaii, 1 December 1960

Redesignated: Joint Base Pearl Harbor–Hickam, 1 January 2010-present

=== Aircraft ===
- F-47N Thunderbolt
- F-86D Sabre Dog
- F-102A Delta Dagger, 1960-1976
- F-4C Phantom II, 1976-1987
- C-7A Caribou, 1978-1982
- C-130A Hercules, 1978-1989
- F-15A/B Eagle, 1987-2009
- F-15C Eagle, 1991-2010
- C-130H2 Hercules, 1999-2006
- C-17 Globemaster III, 2006–present
- KC-135R Stratotanker, 1993–present
- F-22A Raptor, 2010–present

=== Decorations ===
- Air Force Outstanding Unit Award
