= 203rd Air Refueling Squadron =

Hawaii Air National Guard unit

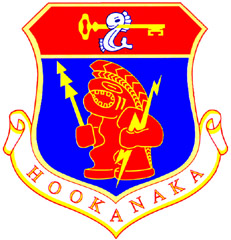
203rd Air Refueling Squadron

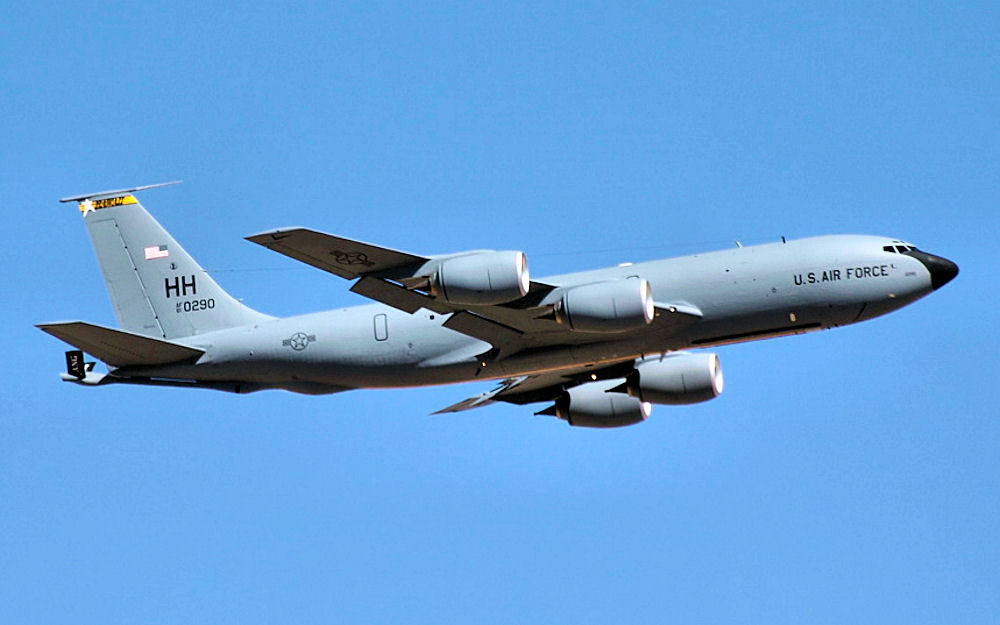
- 203rd Air Refueling Squadron KC-135 Stratotanker (Note: Aircraft is Boeing KC-135R-BN Stratotanker, serial 61-0290.)
- Active: 1993–present
- Country: United States
- Allegiance: Hawaii
- Branch: Air National Guard
- Type: Squadron
- Role: Aerial refueling
- Part of: Hawaii Air National Guard: 154th Wing; 154th Operations Group
- Garrison/HQ: Joint Base Pearl Harbor–Hickam, Hawaii
- Motto: 'A'ole Mamao Loa (Hawaiian for 'Never too Far')

Insignia
- 203rd Air Refueling Squadron emblem

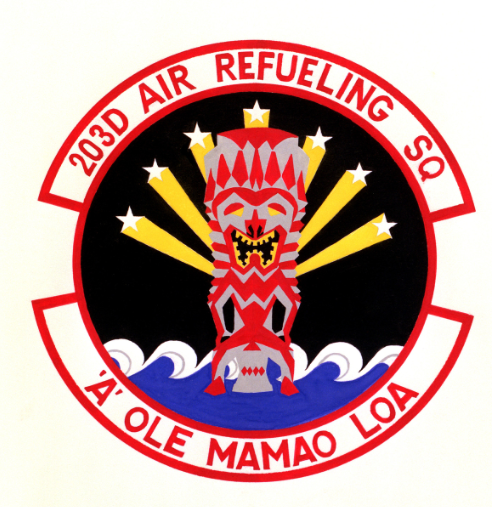
- 203d Air Refueling Squadron emblem (Note: c. 1994.)
- Tail code: HH

The 203rd Air Refueling Squadron is a unit of the Hawaii Air National Guard's 154th Wing located at Joint Base Pearl Harbor–Hickam, Honolulu, Hawaii. The squadron is equipped with the Boeing KC-135R Stratotanker.

== Mission ==
The 203rd Air Refueling Squadron is a unit of the 154th Wing. It is an associate Unit with the 96th Air Refueling Squadron at Joint Base Pearl Harbor–Hickam.

The squadron flies the Boeing KC-135R Stratotanker, which provides air refueling capability for the Air Force and has been in this role for more than 50 years. It also provides aerial refueling support to Air Force, Navy and Marine Corps and allied nation aircraft. The KC-135 is also capable of transporting litter and ambulatory patients using patient support pallets during aeromedical evacuations.

== History ==
Established in 1993 to provide the Hawaii Air National Guard an air refueling mission and to establish an air refueling capability over the middle Pacific Ocean. It began as a small 4 aircraft squadron until 1995 when it was authorized to grow to 8 aircraft and increased personnel.

From late February to April 1998, four KC-135R aircraft from the 203rd, and over 200 154th Wing maintenance and support guard members deployed to Istres Air Base, France, to participate in Operation Deliberate Forge. As real world hostilities began, the focus turned to Operation Allied Force. Seventy combat sorties were flown with a 100 percent mission success rate and zero ground/air mishaps or injuries, and over 3.9 million pounds of fuel were transferred to U.S. and NATO aircraft.

When political and military tensions built up in Southwest Asia, a KC-135R and guard members from the Squadron and 154th Logistics Group were deployed to Eielson Air Force Base, Alaska, to support Operation Phoenix Scorpion in November 1998. The unit took part in exercise RIMPAC 2000, taking place in June 2000.

In February 2001, a KC-135 Stratotanker aircraft from the squadron provided assistance to the U.S. Department of Defense humanitarian aid airlift to earthquake stricken India. A 203rd KC-135 tanker took off from Hickam Air Force Base to refuel the first India-bound Lockheed C-5 Galaxy cargo aircraft laden with relief supplies. The U.S. Air Force C-5 aircraft had departed Travis Air Force Base, California, loaded with heavy equipment and other relief supplies needed in the disaster areas.

On 4 February 2003, two squadron KC-135R Stratotankers from the squadron refueled two Air Combat Command Rockwell B-1B Lancers over the Pacific Ocean while the bombers finished up a 19-hour, more than 15,000-mile, global power mission.

== Lineage ==
- Constituted as the 203rd Air Refueling Squadron and allotted to the Air National Guard in 1993

Received federal recognition and activated on 16 January 1993

=== Assignments ===
- 154th Group, 16 January 1993
- 154th Operations Group, 1 January 1994 – present

=== Stations ===
- Hickam Air Force Base (later Joint Base Pearl Harbor–Hickam), 16 January 1993 – present

=== Aircraft ===
- Boeing KC-135R Stratotanker, 1993 – present
