= Oscar F. Perdomo =

U.S. Air Force officer, "ace in a day" (1919–1976)

Oscar Francis Perdomo
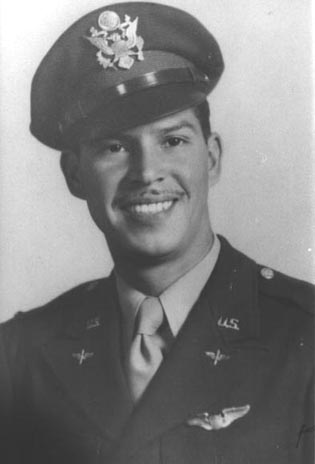
- Lieutenant Oscar F. Perdomo, c. 1945
- Born: June 14, 1919; El Paso, Texas
- Died: March 2, 1976 (aged 56); Los Angeles, California
- Military career
- Allegiance: United States
- Branch: United States Army Air Forces; United States Air Force
- Service years: 1942–1958
- Rank: Major
- Unit: 464th Fighter Squadron
- Conflicts: World War II; Korean War
- Awards: Distinguished Service Cross; Air Medal (2)

Oscar Francis Perdomo (June 14, 1919 – March 2, 1976) was a United States Air Force officer and fighter pilot who was the last "ace in a day" for the United States in World War II.

== Early years ==
Perdomo was born June 14, 1919, in El Paso, Texas, one of five siblings born to Mexican immigrants to the United States. His father served in the Mexican Revolution under the command of Francisco "Pancho" Villa before emigrating to the United States.

== Military service ==
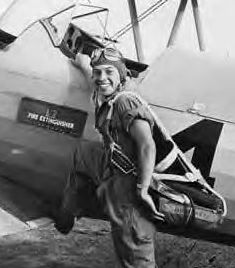
Lt. Perdomo poses with his aircraft.

In February 1943, Perdomo entered an Army Air Forces (AAF) Pilot School in Chandler, Arizona. The AAF schools were civilian flying schools, under government contract, which provided a considerable part of the flying training effort undertaken during World War II by the Army Air Forces. Perdomo received his "wings" on January 7, 1944. He was then sent to the Army Air Forces Basic Flight School at Chico, California, where he underwent further training as a Republic P-47 Thunderbolt pilot. Upon the completion of his training he was assigned to the 464th Fighter Squadron which was part of the 507th Fighter Group that was sent overseas to the Pacific theater to the Island of Ie Shima off the west coast of Okinawa. The primary mission of the 507th was to provide fighter cover to 8th Air Force Boeing B-29's which were to be stationed on Okinawa.

The 507th began operations on July 1, 1945. Perdomo was assigned P-47N-2-RE number 146 aircraft (serial number 44-88211), maintained by crew chief S/Sgt. F. W. Pozieky. Perdomo nicknamed his airplane Lil Meaties Meat Chopper with the nose art depicting a diapered baby chomping a cigar in his mouth and derby hat on his head, clutching a rifle. The name referred to his first son, Kenneth, then a year and a half old. Perdomo flew his first combat mission on July 2, while escorting a B-29 to Kyushu.

=== Ace in a Day ===
A "flying ace" or fighter ace is a military aviator credited with shooting down five or more enemy aircraft during aerial combat. The term "ace in a day" is used to designate a fighter pilot who has shot down five or more airplanes in a single day. Since World War I, a number of pilots have been honored as "Ace in a Day". The last "Ace in a Day" for the United States in World War II was 1st Lt. Oscar Francis Perdomo.

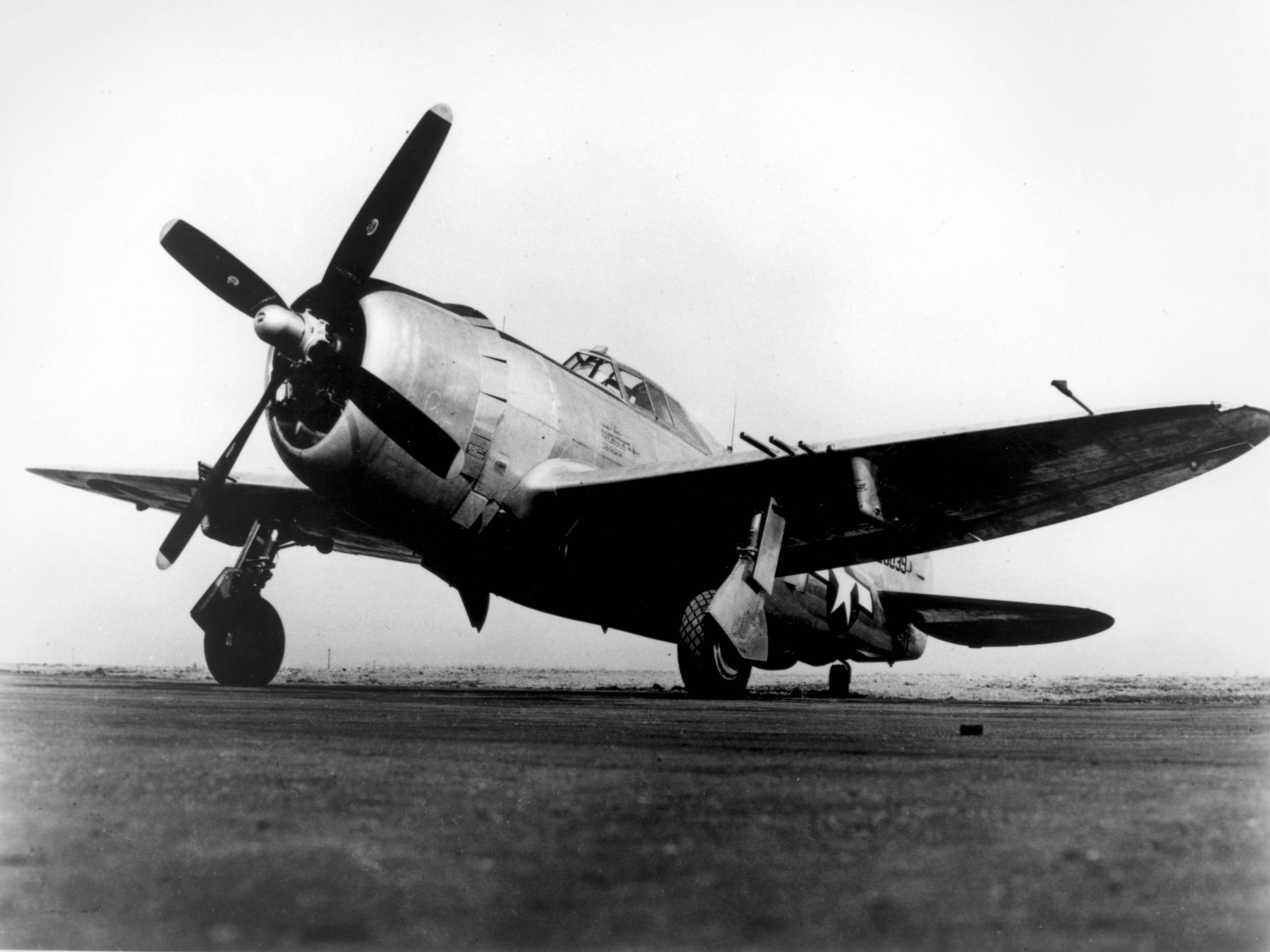
P-47 Thunderbolt

Perdomo was a first lieutenant and a veteran of ten combat missions when on August 9, 1945, the United States dropped the world's second atomic bomb on Nagasaki, Japan. The allies were still awaiting Japan's response to the demand to surrender and the war continued, when on August 13, 1945, 1st Lt. Perdomo, shot down four Nakajima "Oscar" fighters and one Yokosuka "Willow" Type 93 biplane trainer. While the 507th Fighter Group mission reports confirm his kills as "Oscars", they were actually Ki-84 "Franks" from the 22nd and 85th Hiko-Sentais. The combat took place near Keijō / Seoul, South Korea, when 38 Thunderbolts of the 507th Fighter Wing, USAAF, encountered approximately 50 enemy aircraft. It was Perdomo's last combat mission, and the five confirmed victories made him an "Ace in a Day" and thus the distinction of being the last "Ace" of the United States in World War II. He was awarded the Distinguished Service Cross and the Air Medal with one leaf cluster.

== Post-war ==
After the war, Perdomo continued to serve in the Army Air Forces. In 1947, he was reassigned to the newly formed United States Air Force and served until January 1950. When Perdomo returned to civilian life, he joined the Air Force Reserve. On June 30, 1950, Perdomo was recalled to active duty upon the outbreak of the Korean War at the rank of captain. He continued to serve in the Air Force until January 30, 1958, when he left the military at the rank of major.

== Later years ==
Perdomo was emotionally affected by the death of his youngest son, SPC4 Kris Mitchell Perdomo. Kris was one of 3 men killed on May 5, 1970, aboard a U.S. Army helicopter UH-1 Iroquois which crashed and exploded about 5 miles southwest of the city of Phy Vinh in Vĩnh Bình Province, South Vietnam. He had trouble coping with the situation and developed an addiction to alcohol, which took Major Oscar F. Perdomo's life on March 2, 1976. He was proclaimed dead upon his arrival at USC Medical Center, Los Angeles. His name is inscribed in the United States Air Force Memorial.

== Military decorations and awards ==
Major Oscar F. Perdomo's military decorations include the following:

USAF Command pilot badge
Distinguished Service Cross		Air Medal with bronze oak leaf cluster
Air Force Presidential Unit Citation	American Campaign Medal	Asiatic-Pacific Campaign Medal with three bronze campaign stars
World War II Victory Medal	Army of Occupation Medal with 'Japan' clasp	National Defense Service Medal
Air Force Longevity Service Award with two bronze oak leaf clusters	Armed Forces Reserve Medal with bronze hourglass device	Small Arms Expert Marksmanship Ribbon

=== Distinguished Service Cross citation ===

Perdomo, Oscar F.
First Lieutenant, U.S. Army Air Forces
464th Fighter Squadron, 507th Fighter Group, Twentieth Air Force
Date of Action: August 13, 1945

Citation:

The President of the United States of America, authorized by Act of Congress July 9, 1918, takes pleasure in presenting the Distinguished Service Cross to First Lieutenant (Air Corps) Oscar Francis Perdomo, United States Army Air Forces, for extraordinary heroism in connection with military operations against an armed enemy while serving as Pilot of a P-47 Fighter Airplane in the 464th Fighter Squadron, 507th Fighter Group, TWENTIETH Air Force, in aerial combat against enemy forces in the Southwest Pacific Area, on 13 August 1945. When a group of five enemy planes was sighted over Keijo, Korea, by the flight in which Lieutenant Perdomo was an element leader, he pursued the last three enemy aircraft and as he came within range, directed a burst which converged on the nose and cockpit of the last Japanese plane and set it aflame and plunging downward until it exploded. Lining his sights on a second aircraft, he fired until flames broke out in the hostile plane and it rolled over and dived into the ground. Closing on the flight leader, he remained inside a tight turn, firing all the way, until the Japanese craft stalled 100 feet from the ground and crashed. Turning toward Keijo to search for his comrades, Lieutenant Perdomo observed two Willow-type aircraft flying in close formation at 800 feet and went after them. The enemy sighted him and separated, and he chose the closer ship and fired, setting it aflame. Slowing his plane, Lieutenant Perdomo then fired several more bursts at the burning craft which spiraled to the right and dived into the ground. Failing to find the other hostile aircraft, he started to climb above the clouds but suddenly came upon three or four Oscars. He skillfully evaded their concerted attack and came in on them from the rear. One of the enemy turned to the right, but Lieutenant Perdomo fired with deadly accuracy until the plane burst into flames and exploded. Returning to rendezvous with his group, he encountered an Oscar engaged with two P-47's, and as the enemy exposed himself, Lieutenant Perdomo dived, firing steadily, and followed him in a turn, but just as he reached the Oscar his guns stopped. Calling in another P-47, he evaded the hostile plane while his comrade destroyed it. He then rejoined his men in order to complete the round trip of 1,500 miles back to his base. Through his outstanding skill and courage, coupled with his unfaltering determination to destroy the enemy at all costs, Lieutenant Perdomo shot down five Japanese aircraft and upheld the finest traditions of the Army Air Corps.

== See also ==
- Hispanic Americans in World War II
- List of World War II aces from United States
- Hispanics in the United States Air Force
