= 204th Airlift Squadron =

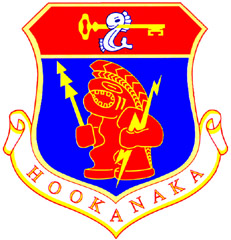
204th Airlift Squadron

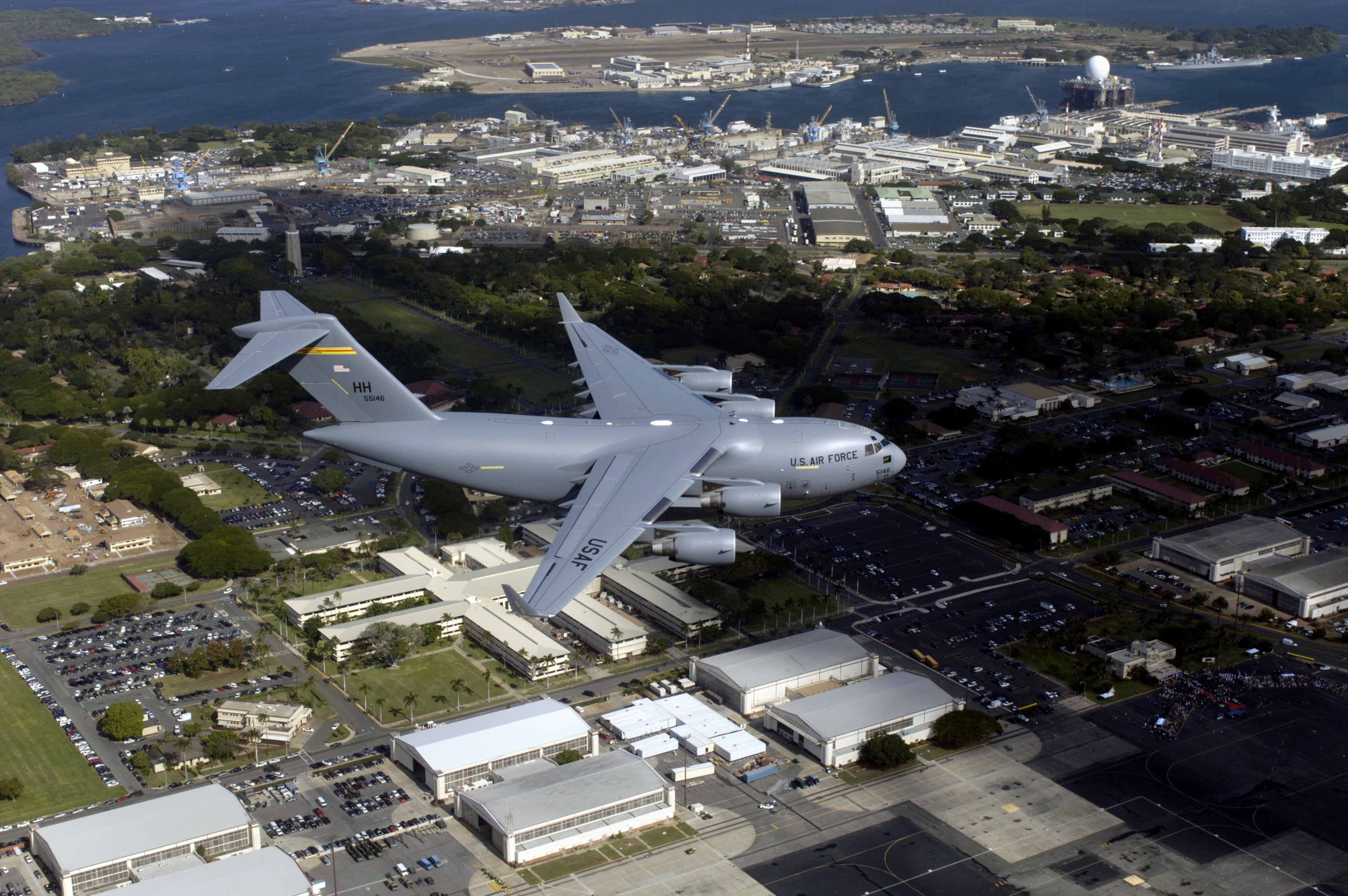
- Squadron C-17 Globemaster III flies over Hickam Air Force Base and Pearl Harbor for the arrival ceremony of its first aircraft (Note: Hickam was the first base outside the continental U.S. to permanently host the C-17.)
- Active: 1994-present
- Country: United States
- Allegiance: Hawaii
- Branch: Air National Guard
- Type: Squadron
- Role: Airlift
- Part of: Hawaii Air National Guard
- Garrison/HQ: Joint Base Pearl Harbor–Hickam, Honolulu, Hawaii
- Motto: Na Manu Ikaikas (Hawaiian for 'Powerful Birds')
- Mascot: Hawaiian owl

Insignia
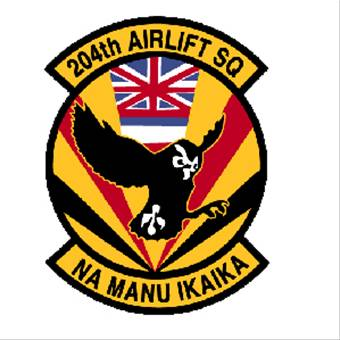
- 204th Airlift Squadron emblem
- Tail code: HH

The 204th Airlift Squadron is a unit of the Hawaii Air National Guard's 154th Wing stationed at Joint Base Pearl Harbor–Hickam, Honolulu, Hawaii. The 204th is equipped with the C-17 Globemaster III.

== Mission ==
The 204th Airlift Squadron is a unit of the 154th Wing. The unit is a classic associate unit with the 535th Airlift Squadron at Joint Base Pearl Harbor–Hickam. It flies the Boeing C-17 Globemaster III. The C-17 is capable of rapid strategic delivery of troops and all types of cargo to main operating bases or directly to forward bases in the deployment area. The aircraft can perform tactical airlift and airdrop missions and can also transport litters and ambulatory patients during aeromedical evacuations when required.

== History ==
The squadron was established in 1994 to provide the Hawaii Air National Guard a theater airlift capability and to support joint exercises in Hawaii with Army and Marine Corps units. The squadron supports operational training, provides paratroop and tactical air drop capability, and deliver relief supplies following natural disasters.

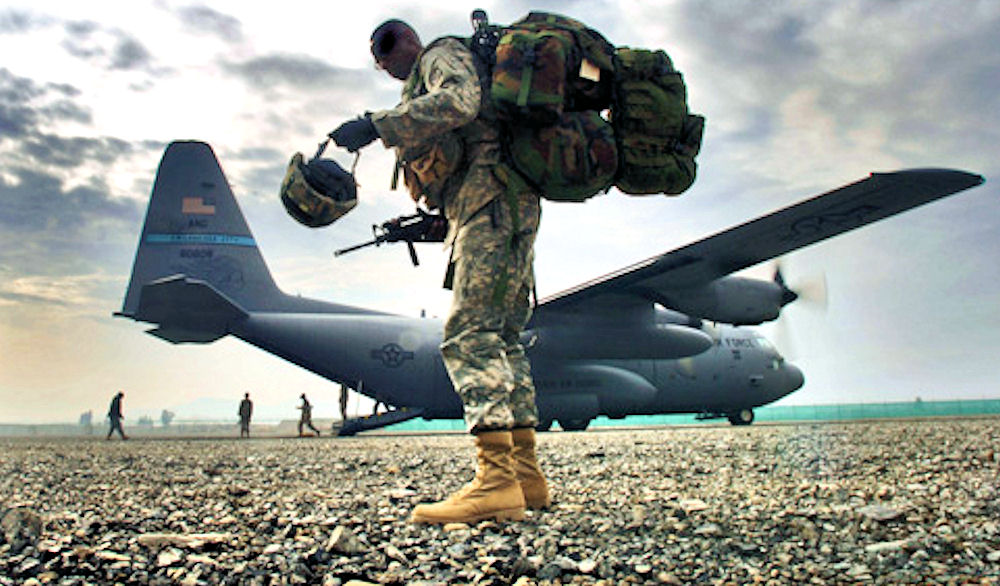
The last C-130 Hercules aircraft scheduled to leave the Hawaii Air National Guard sits in the flight line during a farewell ceremony at Hickam Air Force Base, 8 Feb. 2006.

Since its establishment, squadron C-130 crews have made airdrops over India, shuttled military crews involved in the search for missing in action servicemen in New Zealand and Cambodia, and have even transported to Oahu 30 to 40 people arrested on neighbor island drugs raids.

In April 1999, the 204th Airlift Squadron was awarded the Air Force's Outstanding Unit Award for the period of 14 July 1996 to 13 July 1998. While providing airlift support during the exercise Balikatan 2000, in February 2000, the 204th Airlift Squadron, HIANG, delivered books and school supplies to Virgen Delos Remedios Elementary School, Angeles City, Philippines, while here supporting Balikatan 2000.

After more than a decade the C-130s were the Hawaii National Guard's workhorse — the main means of moving supplies, soldiers, airmen, and even prisoners between the islands. In 2008, the unit was upgraded to the Air Force's latest jet cargo plane, the C-17 Globemaster III.

The eight C-17s are part of a 190-member unit manned by active Air Force personnel from the 535th Airlift Squadron and the Hawaii Air Guard's 204th Airlift Squadron. When established in 2008, it was the first active joint Air Force and Air National Guard unit outside of the mainland.

In July 2018 a C-17 Globemaster III of the squadron collected 55 cases of human remains from Wonsan in North Korea. It is thought that these are remains of US or possibly other UN servicemen from the Korean War. The C-17 then flew to Osan Air Base in South Korea.

The squadron has worked closely with the Department of Defense Manned Space Flight Support Office (Now DoD Human Space Flight Support (HSFS) Office) to develop and implement long-range, high-speed tactics for contingency location, identification, rescue and recovery of US and partner-nation astronauts in support of national priorities and under the management of the Commander, United States Space Command.

=== Lineage ===
- Constituted as the 204th Airlift Squadron and allotted to Hawaii ANG on 16 August 1994

Received federal recognition and activated on 1 August 1994

=== Assignments ===
- 154th Operations Group, 1 August 1994 – present

=== Stations ===
- Hickam Air Force Base (later Joint Base Pearl Harbor–Hickam), 1 August 1994 – present

=== Aircraft ===
- Lockheed C-130A Hercules, 1989-1994
- Lockheed C-130H2 and H3 Hercules, 1994-2006
- Boeing C-17A Globemaster III, 2006–present
