= Hawaii Air National Guard =

United States reserve Air Force and aerial branch of the Hawaii National Guard

- Shield of the Hawaii Air National Guard
- Active: 4 November 1946 - present
- Country: United States
- Allegiance: Hawaii
- Branch: Air National Guard
- Type: State militia, military reserve force
- Role: "To meet state and federal mission responsibilities."
- Part of: Hawaii National Guard; United States National Guard Bureau; National Guard
- Garrison/HQ: Joint Base Pearl Harbor-Hickam; Honolulu, Hawaii
- Motto: Hookanaka "Courageous"

Commanders
- Civilian leadership: President Donald Trump (Commander-in-Chief); Troy Meink (Secretary of the Air Force); Governor Josh Green (Governor of the State of Hawaii)
- State military leadership: Major General Joseph Harris

Aircraft flown
- Fighter: F-22 Raptor
- Transport: C-17 Globemaster III
- Tanker: KC-135 Stratotanker

The Hawaii Air National Guard (HI ANG) is the aerial militia of the U.S. state of Hawaii. It is a reserve of the United States Air Force and along with the Hawaii Army National Guard, an element of the Hawaii National Guard.

As state militia units, the units in the Hawaii Air National Guard are not in the normal United States Air Force chain of command. They are under the jurisdiction of the governor of Hawaii through the office of the Hawaii Adjutant General unless they are federalized by order of the president of the United States. The Hawaii Air National Guard is headquartered at Joint Base Pearl Harbor–Hickam, Honolulu, and its commander is Major General Joseph Harris.

== Overview ==
Under the "Total Force" concept, Hawaii Air National Guard units are considered to be Air Reserve Components (ARC) of the United States Air Force (USAF). Hawaii ANG units are trained and equipped by the Air Force and are operationally gained by a major command of the USAF if federalized. In addition, the Hawaii Air National Guard forces are assigned to Air Expeditionary Forces and are subject to deployment tasking orders along with their active duty and Air Force Reserve counterparts in their assigned cycle deployment window.

Along with their federal reserve obligations, as state militia units the elements of the Hawaii ANG are subject to being activated by order of the governor to provide protection of life and property, and preserve peace, order and public safety. State missions include disaster relief in times of earthquakes, hurricanes, floods and forest fires, search and rescue, protection of vital public services, and support to civil emergencies.

== Components ==
The Hawaii Air National Guard consists of the following major unit:

- 154th Wing

Established 4 November 1946 (as: 199th Fighter Squadron)
Stationed at: Joint Base Pearl Harbor–Hickam, Honolulu
Gained by: Pacific Air Forces
The 154th Wing is the major operational component of the Hawaii Air National Guard. It is an associate unit with the USAF Pacific Air Forces 15th Wing. The 154th is a composite wing, consisting of Air Supremacy, Airlift, Radar, and Air Refueling squadrons.

Support Unit Functions and Capabilities:

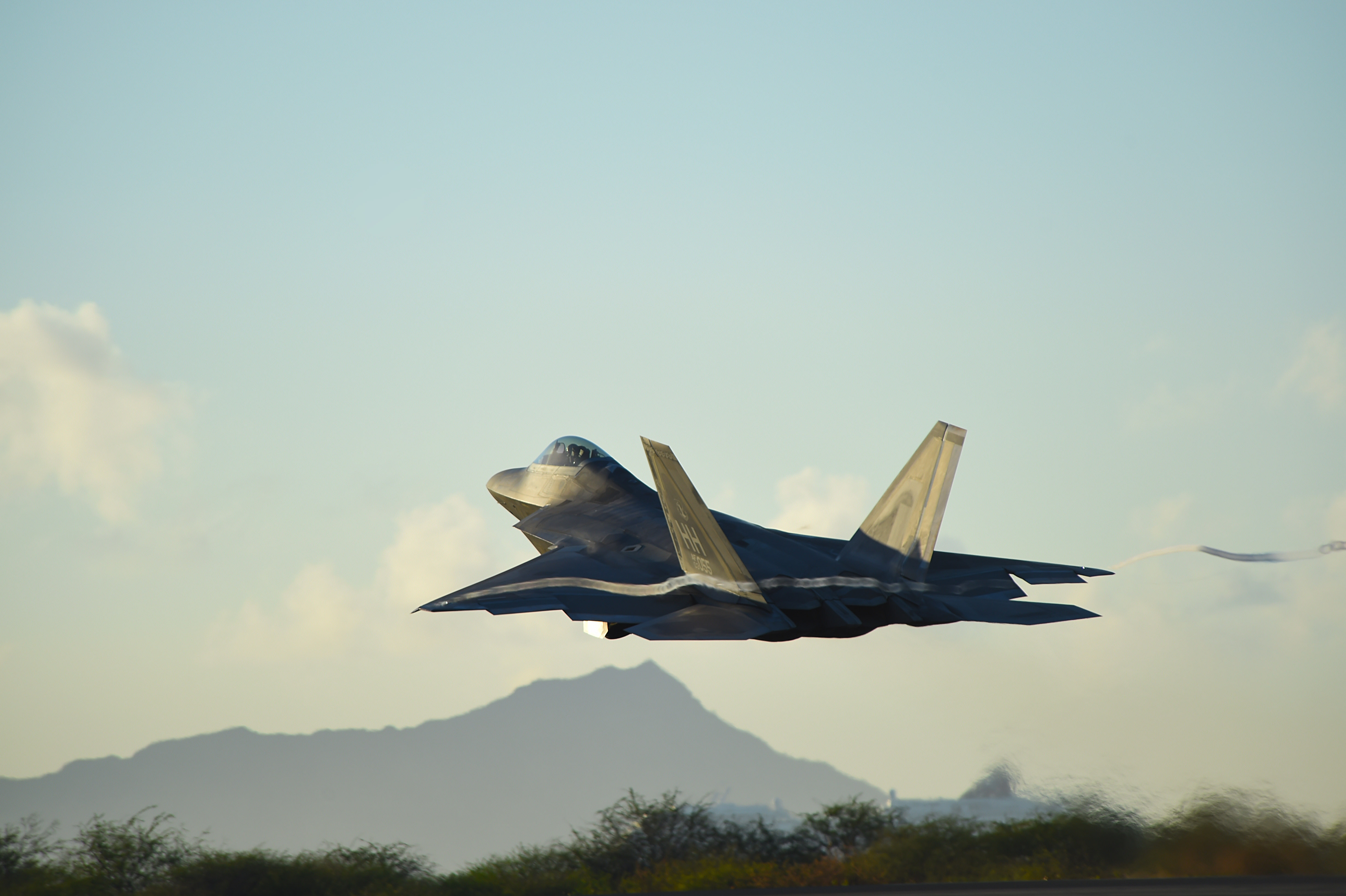
F-22 Raptor from the 199th Fighter Squadron takes off from Joint Base Pearl Harbor-Hickam in 2015.

- 201st Combat Communications Group

The 201st CCG’s mission is to provide tactical communications and air traffic services in the defense and service of the United States of America and its allies.

- 201st Air Operations Group

Co-located with the 613th AOC at Hickam Air Force Base, Hawaii. The mission of the 613th AOC is to provide command and control of real-world air, space and information operations in the Pacific Theater for the Commander of Air Force forces (COMAFFOR) and coalition or joint forces air component commander (C/JFACC).

- Hawaii Region Air Operations Center (HIRAOC)

Located at Wheeler Army Airfield. Air defense of the Hawaiian island chain.

169th Aircraft Control and Warning Squadron (GSU at Mount Kaala, Oahu)
Stationed at Joint Surveillance System station "H-01"; ARSR-4 Radar; Joint-use site between HI ANG and FAA. 21°30′27″N 158°08′31″W
150th Aircraft Control and Warning Flight (GSU at Kokee Air Force Station, Kauai) 169 ACWS OL-AA
Located atop Mount Kokee. Designated as Joint Surveillance System station "H-02"; AN/FPS-117v4 Radar; Joint-use site between HI ANG and FAA. 22°08′52″N 159°38′42″W

- Royal Guard

The Royal Guard is a volunteer ceremonial unit composed of members of the Hawaii Air National Guard of full or partial Native Hawaiian descent. It was formed in 1963 to honor their rich heritage and wears period correct uniforms and call commands during their drill and ceremony in ʻŌlelo Hawaiʻi.

On August 19, 2019, the Hawaii Air National Guard activated the 298th Air Defense Group, which took over control of the 169th Air Defense Squadron, responsible for supporting air defence missions in Hawaii and Guam, and also activated the 298th Support Squadron. "Today the 169th [ADS] effectively became its own group with two squadrons."

== History ==
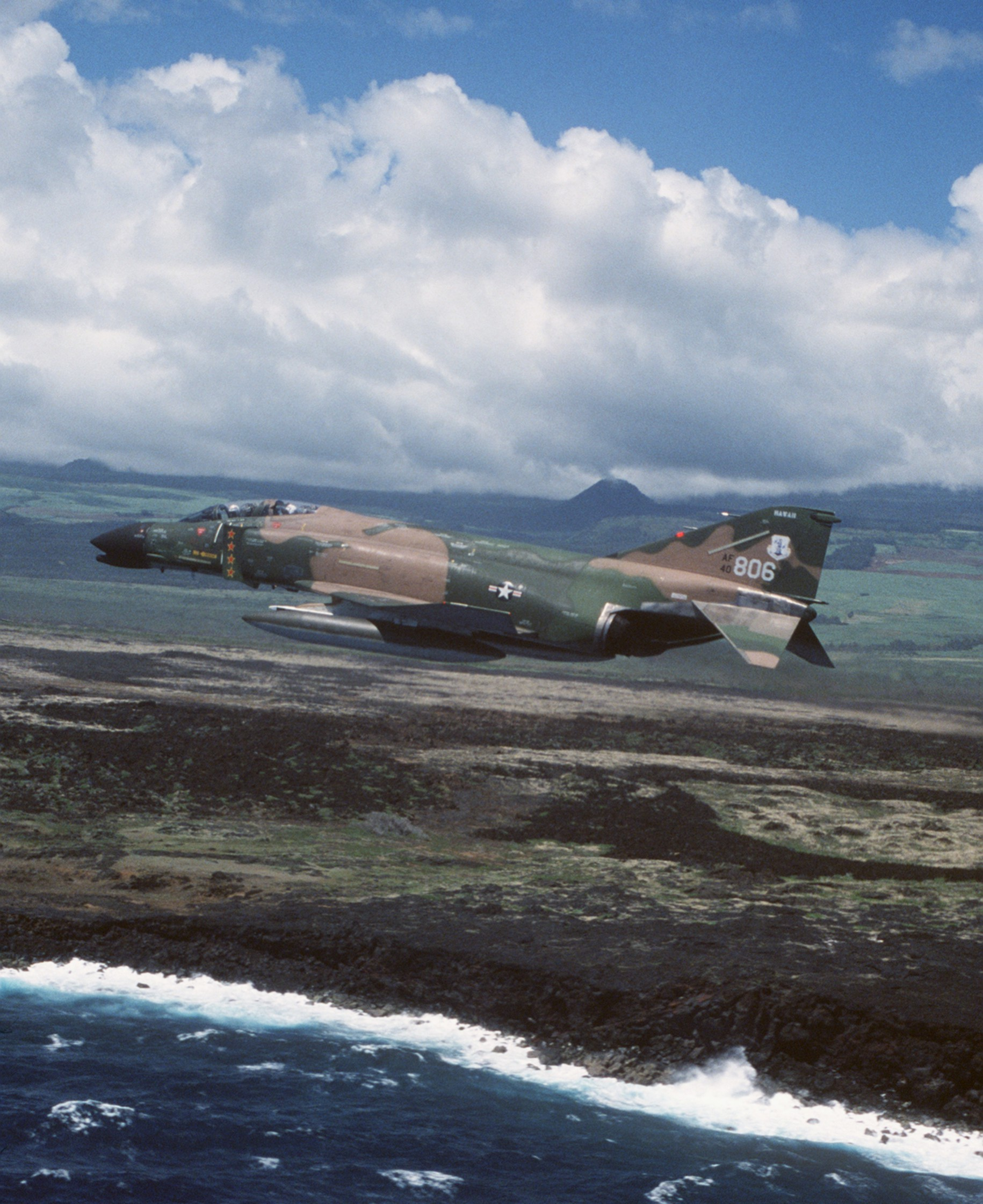
F-4C Phantom II from the 199th Tactical Fighter Squadron in 1979.

The Hawaii Territory Air National Guard was formed as the 199th Fighter Squadron, being extended federal recognition on 4 November 1946 by the National Guard Bureau. The territory had been allocated the World War II 463d Fighter Squadron on 24 April, the 469th having served in China as part of Fourteenth Air Force during World War II. The 199th Fighter Squadron was bestowed the lineage, history, honors, and colors of the 463d Fighter Squadron. The squadron was equipped with F-47N Thunderbolts and was operationally gained by Seventh Air Force. Its mission was the air defense of Hawaii.

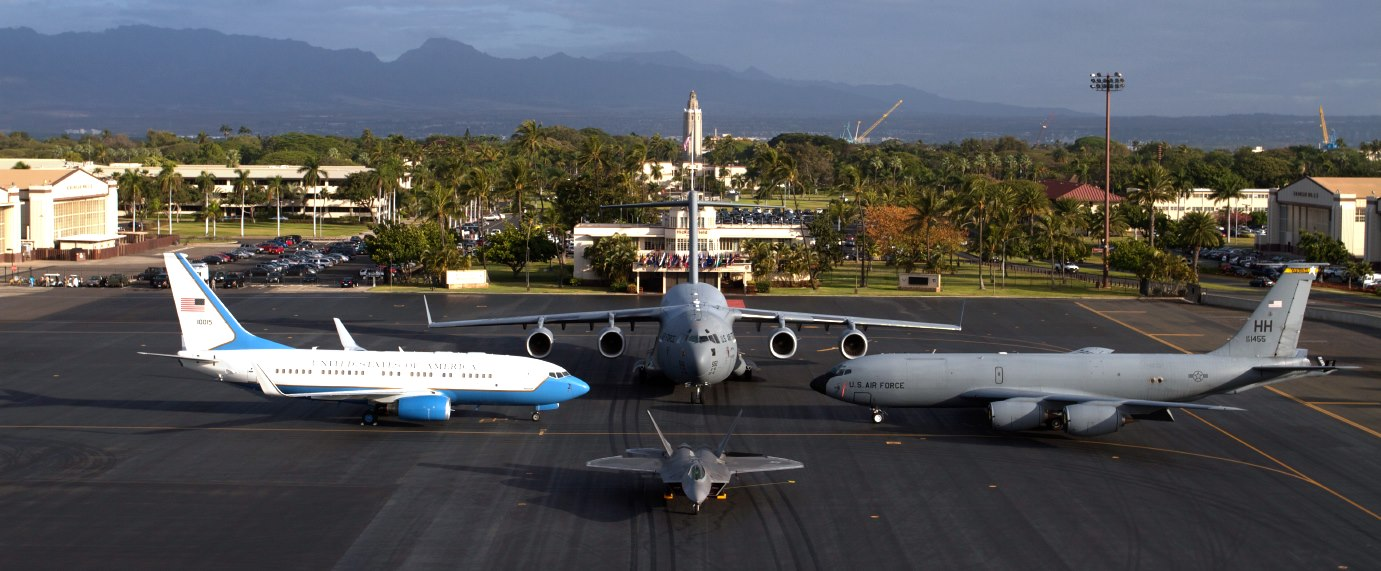
Aircraft of the Hawaii Air Guard at Hickam Field in 2010. The C-40 Clipper, however, is from the 65th Airlift Squadron of the 15th Airlift Wing.

Bellows Field, which was attacked during the 7 December 1941 Japanese attack on Oahu, was excess after World War II ended, and it served as home for the Hawaii Air National Guard. In 1947, the costs to operate Bellows as an active Air National Guard station led the Territorial government to negotiate with the Army about its future. The Army indicated that it wanted to retain the field in a commissioned status but that it had no funds to maintain the field. The Army offered the Aviation Unit of the Hawaiian National Guard joint use of the field provided all maintenance was assumed by the Guard. A settlement was reached to move the 199th to Hickam Field, and to use excess facilities there. 18 September 1947, however, is considered the Hawaii Air National Guard's official birth, concurrent with the establishment of the United States Air Force as a separate branch of the United States military under the National Security Act. On 1 December 1960, the 199th was authorized to expand to a group level, and the 154th Fighter-Interceptor Group was established by the National Guard Bureau.

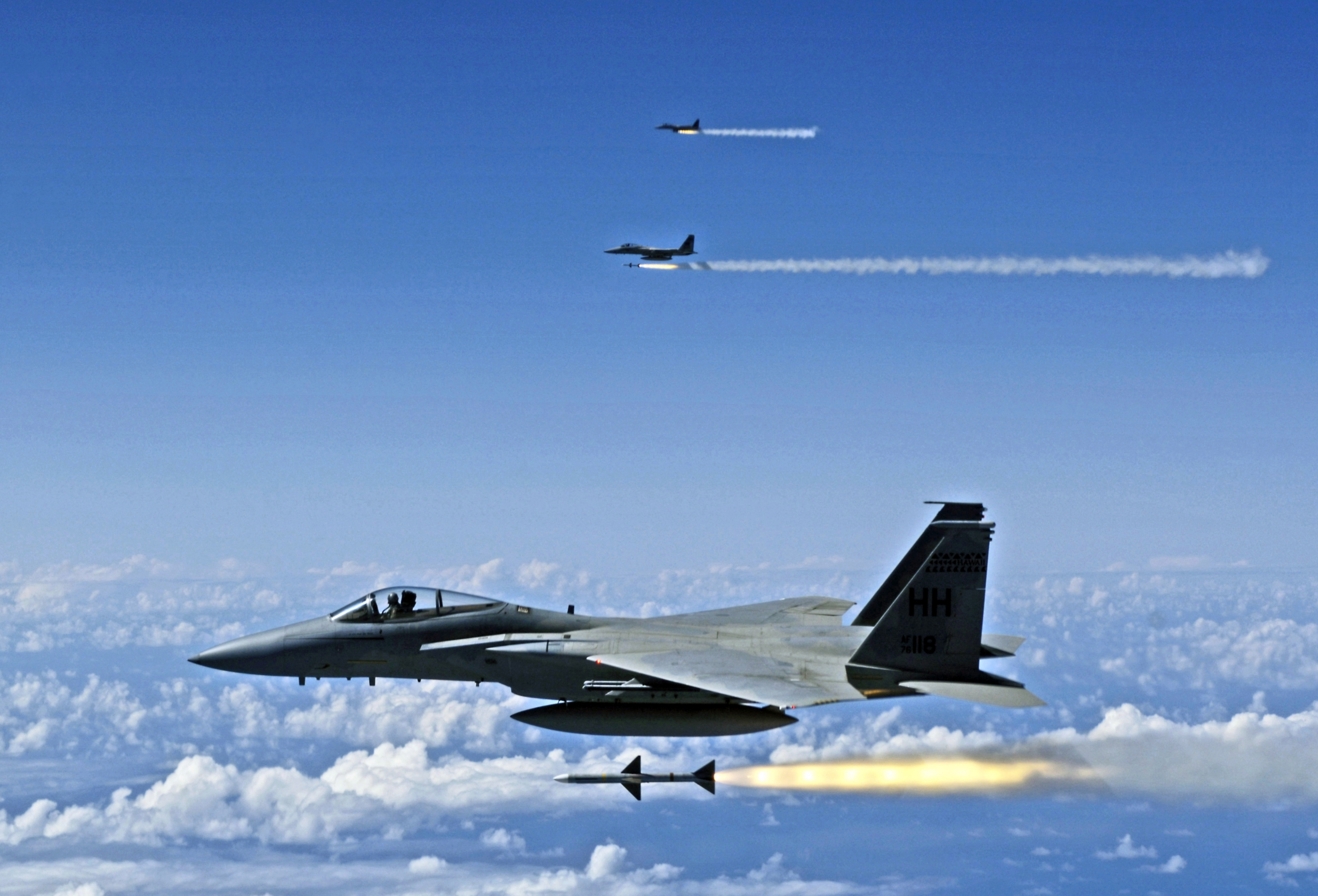
F-15A's from the 199th Fighter Squadron fire AIM-7 missiles at an air-launched decoy over Hickam Air Force Base in 2006.

Today the Hawaii ANG 199th Fighter Squadron flies the F-22A Raptor as an associate unit of the USAF with the USAF 15th Wing 19th Fighter Squadron; the 203d Air Refueling Squadron flies the KC-135R Stratotanker as an associate of the 96th Air Refueling Squadron and the 204th Airlift Squadron flies the C-17 Globemaster III as an associate of the 535th Airlift Squadron at Joint Base Pearl Harbor-Hickam. Other HI ANG units perform air defense radar, combat communications and air operations missions.

After the September 11th, 2001 terrorist attacks on the United States, elements of every Air National Guard unit in Hawaii has been activated in support of the global war on terrorism. Flight crews, aircraft maintenance personnel, communications technicians, air controllers and air security personnel were engaged in Operation Noble Eagle air defense overflights of major United States cities. Also, Hawaii ANG units have been deployed overseas as part of Operation Enduring Freedom in Afghanistan and Operation Iraqi Freedom in Iraq as well as other locations as directed.

== See also ==
- Hawaii Territorial Guard
- Hawaii Wing Civil Air Patrol
