= Kaʻala =

Highest mountain on the island of Oahu, Hawaii, US

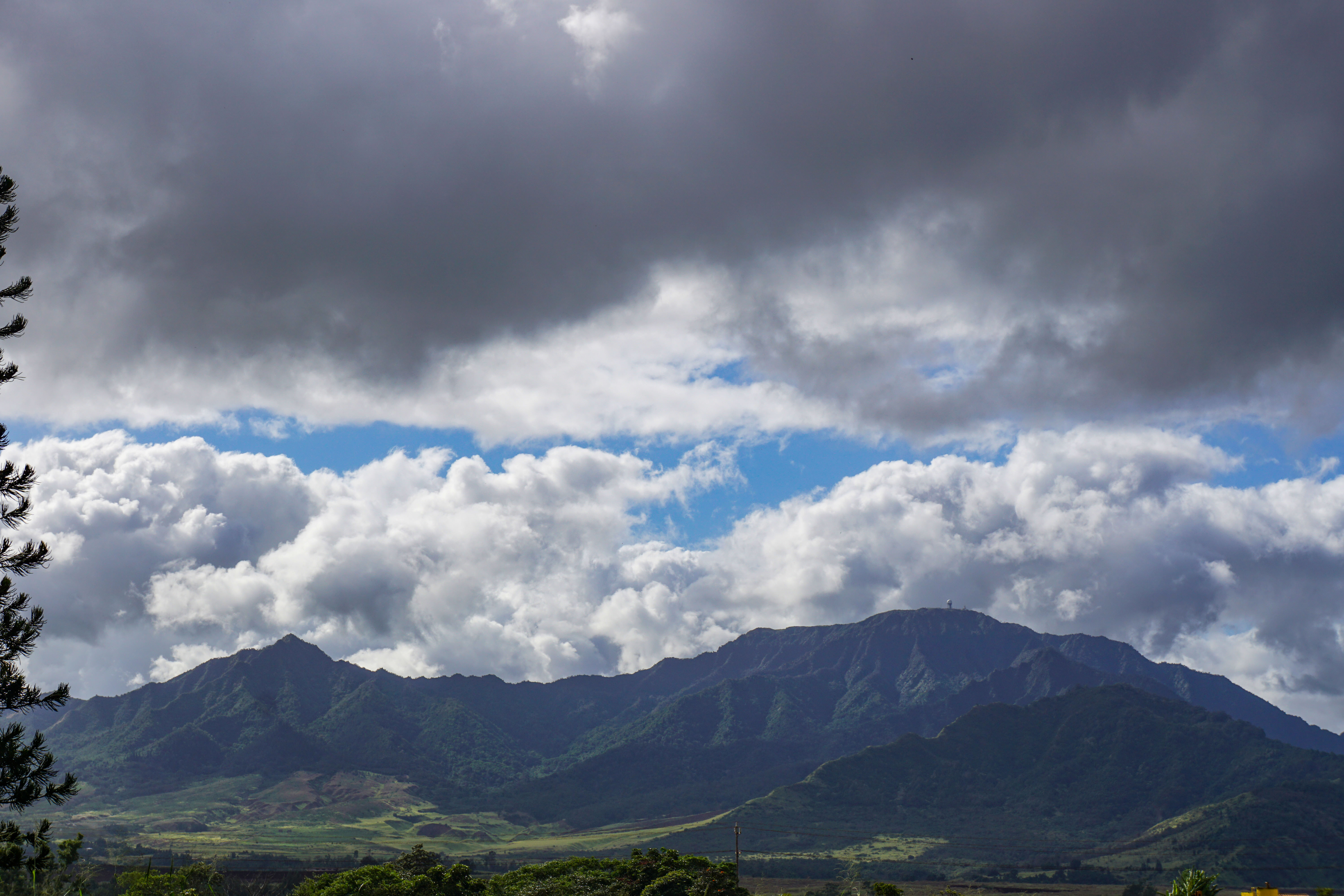
- Mt. Kaʻala, as seen from near Dole Plantation.

Highest point
- Elevation: 4,025 ft (1,227 m)
- Prominence: 4,025 ft (1,227 m)
- Listing: Ribu
- Coordinates: 21°30′25″N 158°08′34″W

Naming
- Language of name: Hawaiian
- Pronunciation: Hawaiian pronunciation: [kəˈʔɐlə]

Geography
- Location within Hawaii
- Location: Oahu, Hawaii, US
- Parent range: Waianae Range
- Topo map: USGS Haleiwa

Geology
- Rock age: 3.9 Ma
- Mountain type: Plateau
- Volcanic zone: Hawaiian-Emperor seamount chain

Kaʻala or Mount Kaʻala (pronounced [kəˈʔɐlə] in Hawaiian) is the highest mountain on the island of Oahu, at 1,227 metres (4,026 ft). It is a part of the Waianae Range, an eroded shield volcano on the west side of the island. The FAA maintains an active tracking station at the summit, which is closed to the general public and secured by the US Army, which is stationed at the base of the mountain at Schofield Barracks. The tracking station can be clearly seen from afar as a white, domed-shaped structure.

== Climbing ==
The round-trip hike to the summit is a strenuous effort that typically takes 4–6 hours to complete. Much of the trail is steep, heavily foliaged, narrow, and muddy. Some segments of the trail have ropes and ladders in place due to the steepness and slipperiness. The round-trip hike has a distance of 7 miles (11 km) and 3,600 feet (1,100 m) in elevation gain.

== See also ==
- List of mountain peaks of the United States
  - List of volcanoes of the United States
    - List of mountain peaks of Hawaii
- Evolution of Hawaiian volcanoes
- Hawaii hotspot
- Hawaiian–Emperor seamount chain
