= 458th Tactical Fighter Squadron =

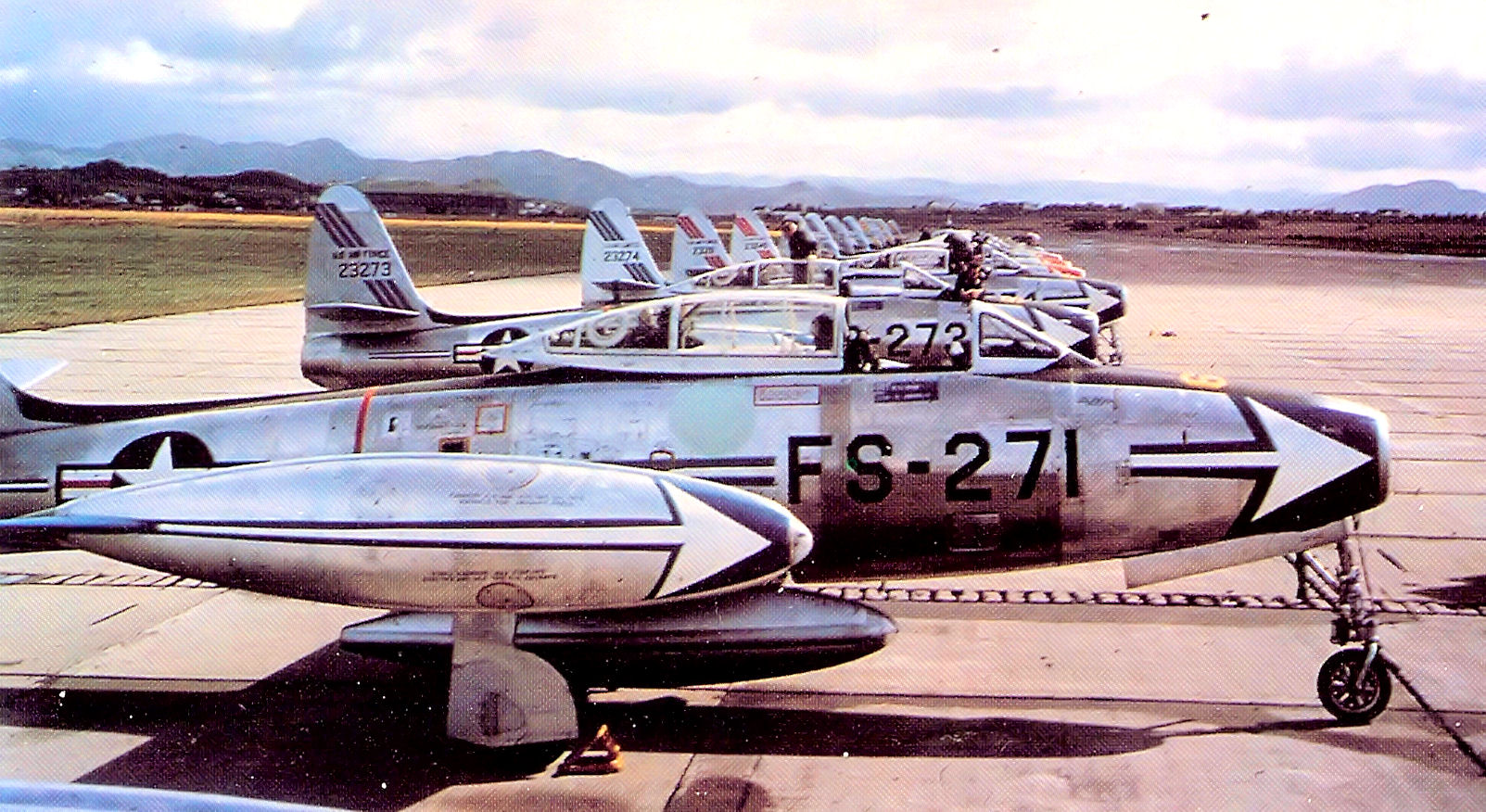
- 506th Strategic Fighter Wing F-84 Thunderjets in 1954
- Active: 1944–1945; 1953–1959
- Country: United States
- Branch: United States Air Force
- Role: Fighter
- Engagements: Pacific Ocean Theater
- Decorations: Distinguished Unit Citation

Insignia
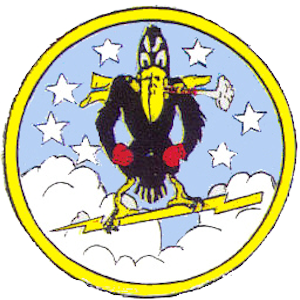
- 458th Strategic Fighter Squadron emblem (Note: Approved 14 April 1954. Based on World War II emblem. Watkins, p.46)

The 458th Tactical Fighter Squadron is an inactive United States Air Force unit. It was last assigned to the 506th Tactical Fighter Wing at Tinker Air Force Base, Oklahoma, where it was inactivated on 1 April 1959.

== History ==
=== World War II ===
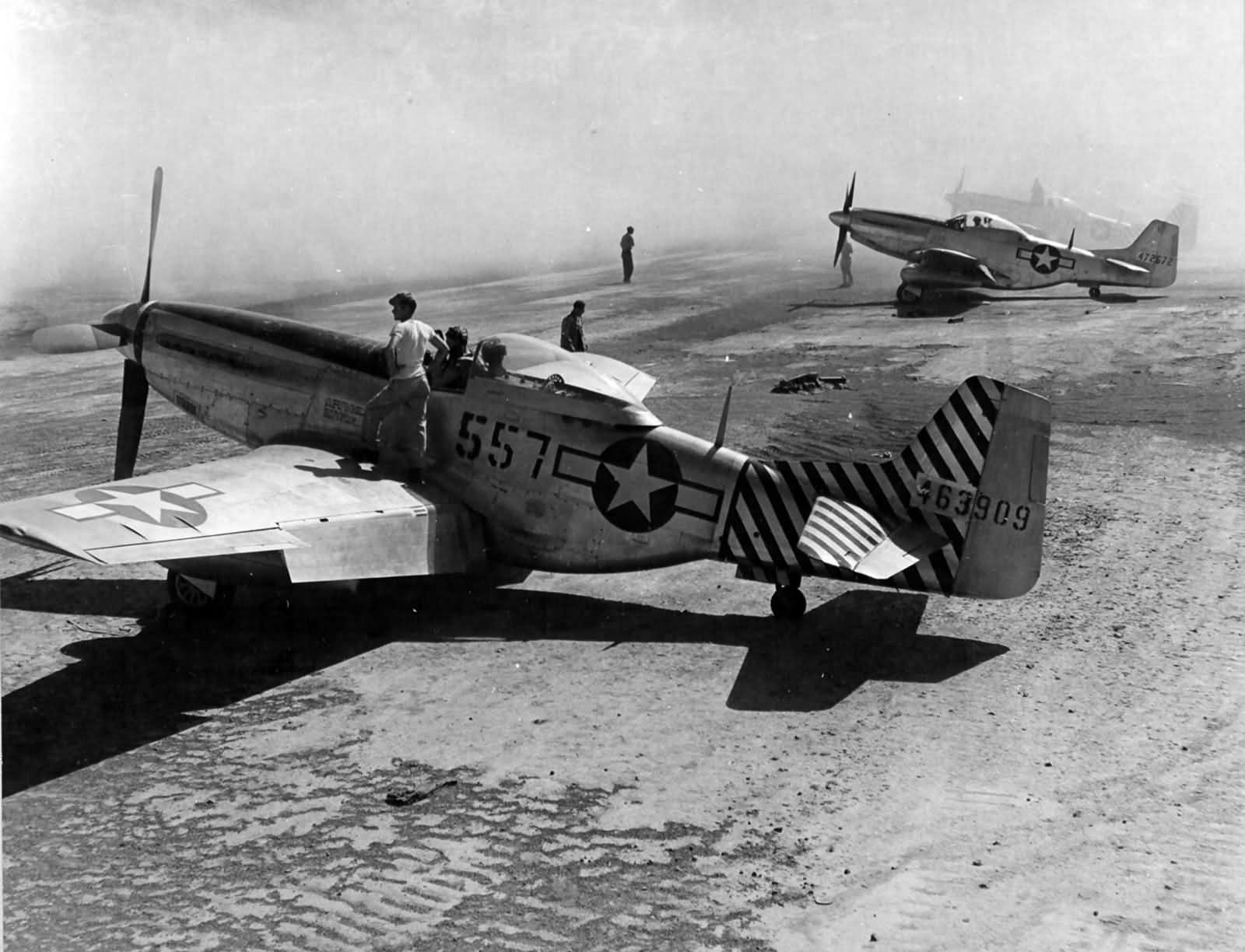
Squadron P-51Ds at Iwo Jima

Trained in the continental United States, Oct 1944 – Feb 1945. Moved to western Pacific Ocean in spring of 1945. Escorted Boeing B-29 Superfortress bombers in raids against Japan, and attacked targets such as enemy airfields, May-Aug 1945.

=== Cold War ===
Between 1953 and 1959 the unit trained for a variety of tactical air missions. Frequently deployed for training exercises, some of them overseas.

== Lineage ==
- Constituted as the 458th Fighter Squadron, Single Engine on 5 October 1944

Activated on 21 October 1944
Inactivated on 16 December 1945

- Redesignated 458th Strategic Fighter Squadron on 20 November 1952

Activated on 20 January 1953
Redesignated 458th Fighter-Day Squadron on 1 July 1957
Redesignated 458th Fighter-Bomber Squadron on 1 January 1958
Redesignated 458th Tactical Fighter Squadron on 1 July 1958
Inactivated on 1 April 1959

=== Assignments ===
- 506th Fighter Group, 21 October 1944 – 16 December 1945
- 506th Strategic Fighter Wing (later 506th Fighter-Day Wing, 506th Fighter-Bomber Wing, 506th Tactical Fighter Wing), 20 January 1953 – 1 April 1959

=== Stations ===
- Lakeland Army Air Field, Florida, 21 October 1944 – 16 February 1945
- North Field, Iwo Jima, 24 April – 3 December 1945
- Camp Anza, California, 15–16 December 1945
- Dow Air Force Base, Maine, 20 January 1953
- Tinker Air Force Base, Oklahoma, 20 March 1955 – 1 April 1959

=== Aircraft ===
- North American P-51 Mustang, 1944-1945
- Republic F-84 Thunderjet, 1953-1957
- North American F-100 Super Sabre, 1957-1958
