= 531st Tactical Fighter Squadron =

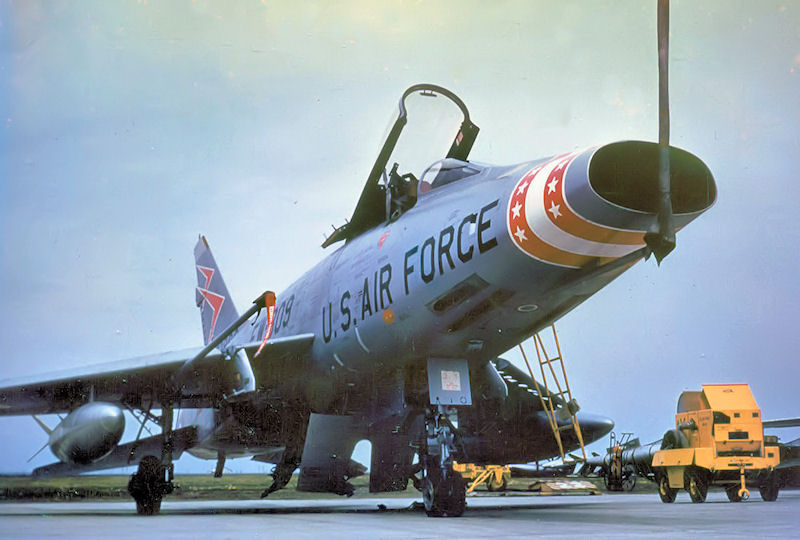
- 531st Tactical Fighter Squadron F-100 Super Sabre (Note: Aircraft is North American F-100D-30-NA Super Sabre serial 55-3809. This plane was shot down in South Viet Nam on 12 October 1966. The pilot safely ejected. Dirkx, Marco (6 May 2024). "1955 USAF Serial Numbers". Joe Baugher’s Serial Number List.)
- Active: 1941-1946; 1953-1958; 1958-1970
- Country: United States
- Branch: United States Air Force
- Role: Fighter
- Mottos: Strike and Return
- Engagements: Pacific Ocean Theater; Vietnam War

Insignia
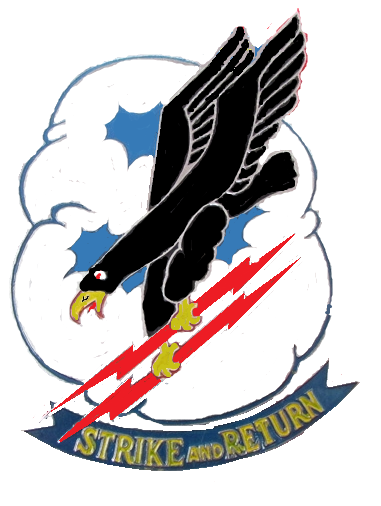
- 531 Tactical Fighter Sq emblem (Note: Approved 10 November 1958. Description: On and over a white cloud formation edged and voided of the sky, Air Force blue, a black hawk swooping in downward flight, details of wings white, his beak and talons Air Force golden yellow, outlines and details red, grasping in each foot a red lightning streak)

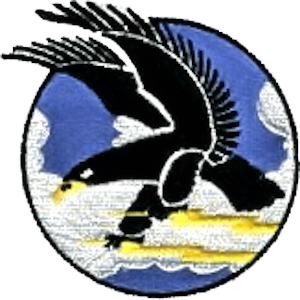
- 531st Fighter Squadron emblem (Note: Approved 7 Jul 1944.)

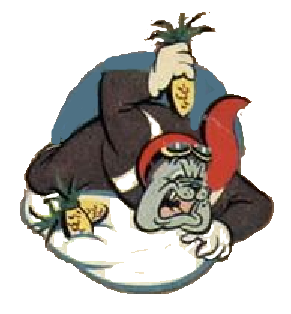
- 58th Bombardment Squadron emblem

The 531st Tactical Fighter Squadron is an inactive United States Air Force unit, last assigned to the 3rd Tactical Fighter Wing at Bien Hoa Air Base, South Vietnam. The squadron was inactivated on 31 July 1970.

== History ==
=== World War II ===
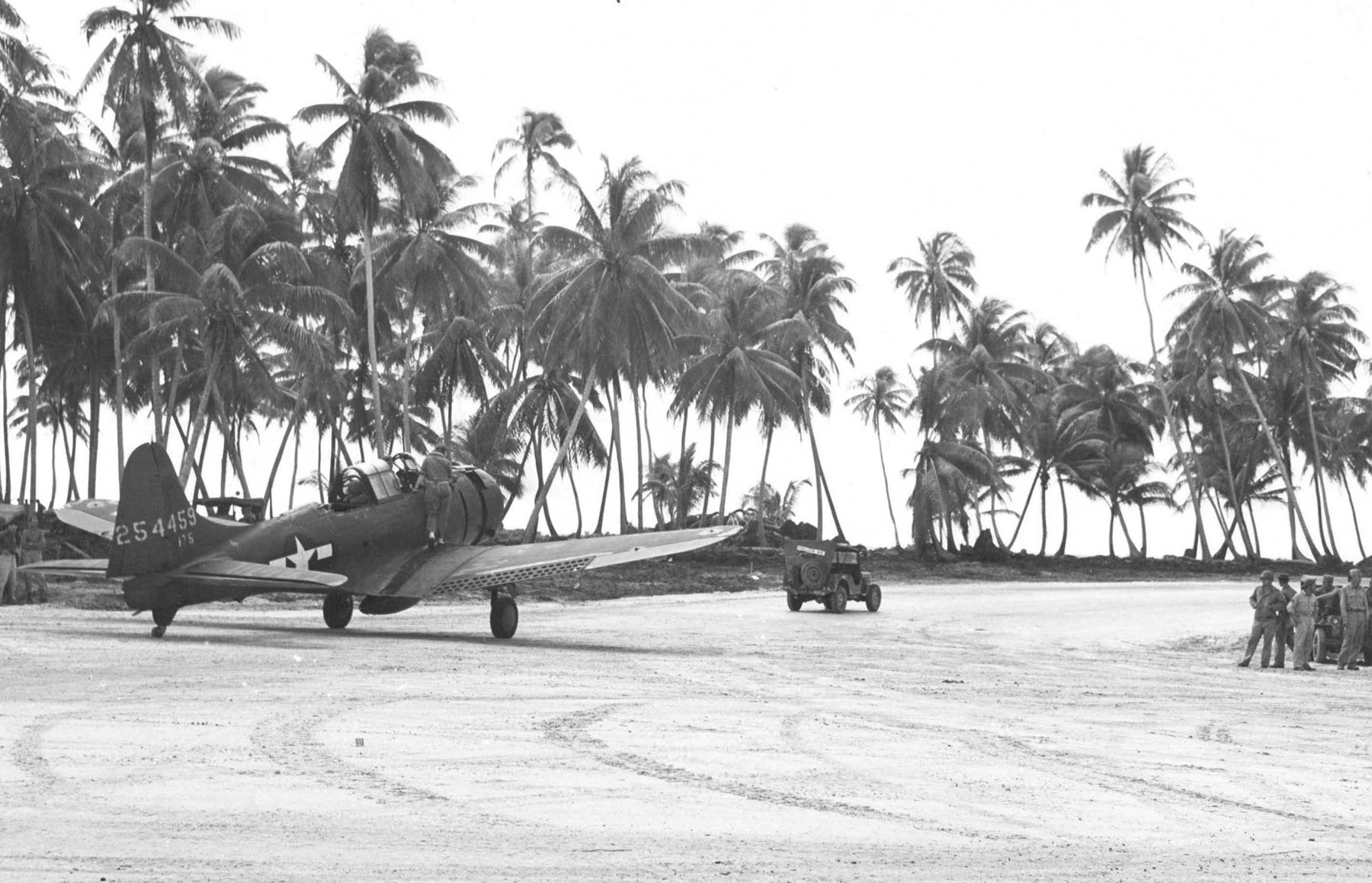
Squadron A-24B on Makin Island

Activated in Hawaii in 1941 as the 58th Bombardment Squadron (Light), a Bombardment/Reconnaissance squadron, being equipped with a mixture of B-18 Bolos, second-line P-26s, and A-20 Havocs. Was part of the air defense forces of Hawaii, many aircraft being destroyed during the Pearl Harbor Attack at Hickam Field. Re-equipped with A-24 Dauntless dive bombers in 1942, remained in Hawaii as an air defense squadron until 1943.

Re-designated as a fighter-bomber squadron in mid-1943, deploying to the Central Pacific in 1944 as part of the 21st Fighter Group. Returned to Hawaii and re-equipped with long-range P-38 Lightnings and returned to combat operations in the Central Pacific, operating from Iwo Jima beginning in early 1945 until the end of the war in August. Remained as part of Twentieth Air Force in the Marianas until inactivated in October 1946.

=== Cold War ===
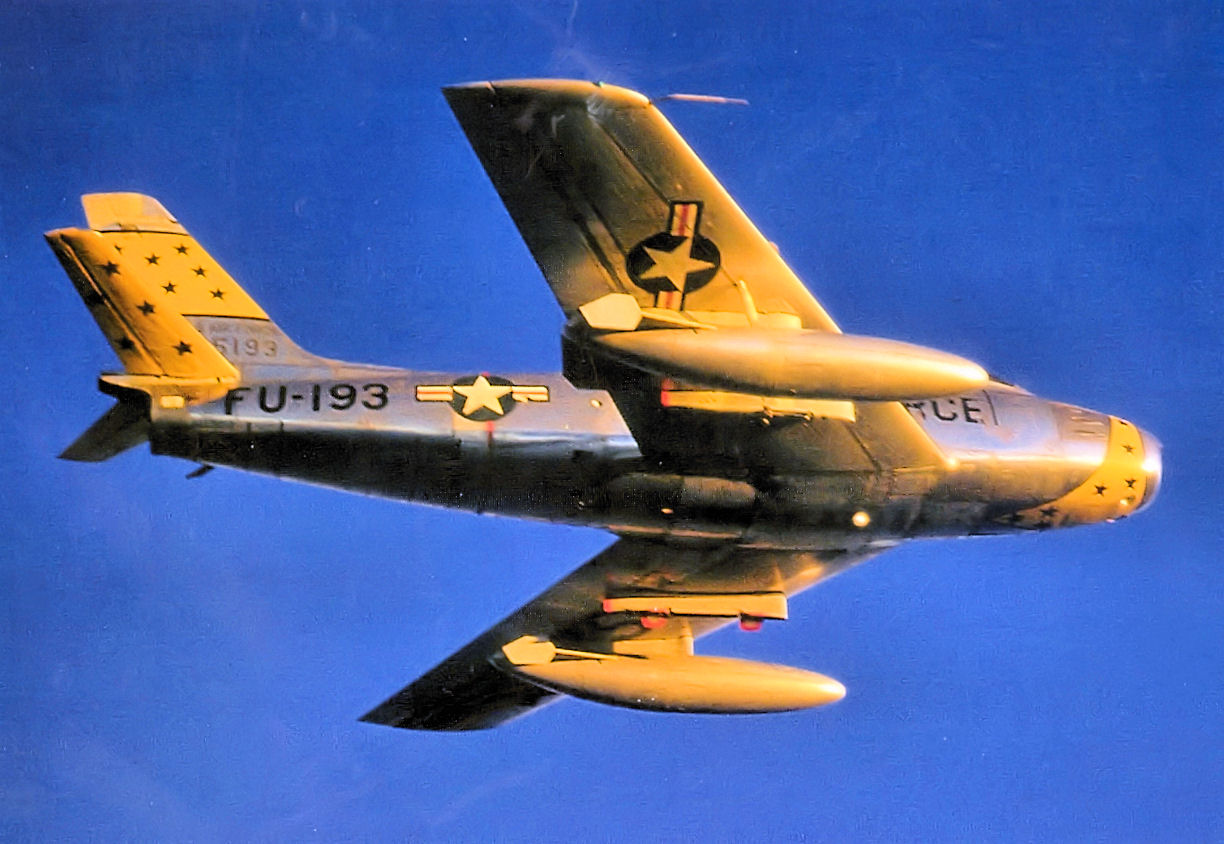
531st Fighter-Bomber Squadron F-86F Sabre (Note: Aircraft is North American F-86F-35-NA Sabre serial 52-5193. Taken over France in 1955.)

Reactivated in 1953 at George Air Force Base, California as a North American F-86 Sabre Fighter-Bomber Squadron. Spent about a year under Tactical Air Command training, deploying to France in 1954 as part of the NATO buildup of the United States Air Forces in Europe during the early years of the Cold War. Operated from several bases in France during the 1950s, inactivated in 1958 as part of a USAFE reorganization.

Became part of PACAF in 1958, operated North American F-100 Super Sabres from Misawa Air Base, Japan as an air defense squadron.

=== Viet Nam War ===
Deployed to South Vietnam, 1965 and carried out combat operations until inactivated in 1970.

== Lineage ==
- Constituted as the 58th Bombardment Squadron (Light) on 22 November 1940

Activated on 1 January 1941
Redesignated 58th Bombardment Squadron (Dive) on 19 October 1942
Redesignated 531st Fighter-Bomber Squadron on 14 August 1943
Redesignated 531st Fighter Squadron on 18 February 1944
Inactivated on 10 October 1946

- Redesignated 531st Fighter-Bomber Squadron on 15 November 1952

Activated on 1 January 1953
Inactivated on 8 February 1958

- Redesignated 531st Tactical Fighter Squadron on 19 May 1958

Activated on 1 July 1958
Inactivated on 31 June 1970

=== Assignments ===
- Hawaiian Air Force (later Seventh Air Force), 1 January 1941
- 21st Fighter Group, 15 June 1944 – 10 October 1946
- 21st Fighter-Bomber Group, 1 January 1953 – 8 February 1958
- 21st Tactical Fighter Wing, 1 July 1958
- 39th Air Division, 18 June 1960
- 3rd Tactical Fighter Wing, 16 December 1965 – 31 July 1970

=== Stations ===
- Hickam Field, Hawaii, 1 January 1941
- Bellows Field, Hawaii, 18 March 1941
- Hickam Field, Hawaii, 29 April 1941
- Bellows Field, Hawaii, 11 December 1941
- Wheeler Field, Hawaii, 19 December 1941 – 18 June 1943
- Canton Island, Phoenix Islands, 24 June 1943
- Makin Island, Gilbert Islands, 18 December 1943
- Bellows Field, Hawaii, 1 March 1944
- Kualoa Field, Hawaii, 21 April 1944
- Mokuleia Field, Hawaii, 8 October 1944
- Central Field (Iwo Jima), 26 March 1945
- South Field (Iwo Jima), 15 July 1945
- Isely Field, Saipan, 5 December 1945
- Northwest Field (Guam), 17 April – 10 October 1946
- George Air Force Base, California, 1 January 1953
- Toul-Rosières Air Base, France, 28 November 1954
- Chambley-Bussières Air Base, France, March 1955
- Misawa Air Force Base, Japan, 1 July 1958 (deployed to Da Nang Air Base, South Vietnam, 1 February – 13 July 1965)
- Bien Hoa Air Base, South Vietnam, 16 December 1965 – 31 July 1970

=== Aircraft ===
- Boeing P-26 Peashooter, 1941
- Douglas B-18 Bolo, 1941
- Douglas A-20 Havoc, 1941–1942
- Douglas A-24 Dauntless, 1942–1944
- Lockheed P-38 Lightning, 1944–1946
- North American F-86 Sabre, 1953–1958
- North American F-100 Super Sabre, 1958–1970
