= 452nd =

452nd or 452d may refer to:

- 452d Air Mobility Wing, United States Air Force air mobility unit located at March ARB, California
- 452d Flight Test Squadron (452 FLTS), part of the 412th Test Wing, based at Edwards Air Force Base, California
- 452d Operations Group, the flying component of the 452d Air Mobility Wing, assigned to the United States Air Force Reserve
- 452d Strategic Fighter Squadron, inactive United States Air Force unit

== See also ==
- 452 (number)
- 452, the year 452 (CDLII) of the Julian calendar
- 452 BC
