= 470th Tactical Fighter Squadron =

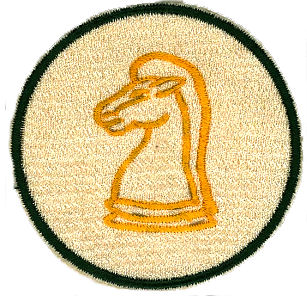
- 470th Tactical Fighter Squadron - Emblem
- Active: 1957-1959
- Country: United States
- Branch: United States Air Force

The 470th Tactical Fighter Squadron is an inactive United States Air Force unit. It was last assigned to the 506th Tactical Fighter Wing, based at Tinker Air Force Base, Oklahoma. It was inactivated on 1 April 1959.

== History ==
Established in 1957 as an F-100 Super Sabre training unit for the 506th Fighter Day Wing. It was inactivated on 1 April 1959 due to budget constraints.

=== Lineage ===
- Established as: 470th Fighter-Day Squadron on 25 September 1957

Re-designated: 470th Fighter-Bomber Squadron on 1 January 1958
Re-designated: 470th Tactical Fighter Squadron on 1 July 1958
Inactivated on 1 April 1959

=== Assignments ===
- 506th Tactical Fighter Wing (various designations), 25 September 1957 – 1 April 1959

=== Stations ===
- Tinker AFB, Oklahoma, 25 September 1957 – 1 April 1959

=== Aircraft ===
- F-100 Super Sabre, 1957–1959
