= 2d Fighter Squadron (Commando) =

- Active: 1944-1945
- Country: United States
- Branch: United States Army Air Force
- Role: Air Commando
- Engagements: World War II

The 2d Fighter Squadron (Commando) is an inactive United States Air Force unit. It was last assigned to the Tenth Air Force, based at Camp Kilmer, New Jersey. It was inactivated on 12 November 1945.

The squadron trained for operations with P-51 Mustangs as part of Third Air Force and trained at the Army Air Force School of Applied Tactics. It moved to India, September–November 1944 assigned to Tenth Air Force. It fought in the China-Burma-India theater, 14 February-9 May 1945. After May 1945 in training. Returned to the US during October— November 1945.

== History ==
=== Lineage ===
- Constituted 2d Fighter Reconnaissance Squadron on 11 April 1944

Activated on 20 April 1944
Redesignated as: 2d Fighter Squadron (Commando) on 2 June 1944
Inactivated on 12 November 1945
Disbanded on 8 October 1948.

=== Assignments ===
- Third Air Force, 20 April 1944
- 2d Air Commando Group, 22 April 1944 – 12 November 1945.
- Army Service Forces, 11–12 November 1945

=== Stations ===
- Lakeland AAF, Florida, 20 April 1944
- Cross City AAF, Florida, 12 June 1944
- Alachua AAF, Florida, 21 June 1944
- Drew Field, Florida, 17 August 1944
- Lakeland AAF, Florida, 22 August-23 October 1944
- Kalaikunda Airfield, India, 14 December 1944
- Cox's Bazar, India, 13 February 1945
- Kalaikunda Airfield, India, io May-22 October 1945
- Camp Kilmer, New Jersey, 11–12 November 1945.

== Aircraft ==
- P-51D Mustang, 1944–1945
- F-6 (P-51D) Mustang, 1945
