= 462nd Tactical Fighter Squadron =

Inactive US Air Force unit

462d Tactical Fighter Squadron
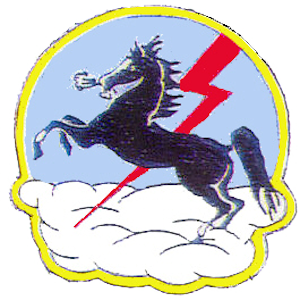
- Emblem of the 62d Tactical Fighter Squadron
- Active: 1944-1959
- Role: Fighter

The 462d Tactical Fighter Squadron is an inactive United States Air Force unit. It was last assigned to the 506th Tactical Fighter Wing, stationed at Tinker Air Force Base, Oklahoma. It was inactivated on 1 April 1959.

== History ==
Trained in the continental United States, Oct 1944 – Feb 1945. Moved to western Pacific Ocean in spring of 1945. Escorted B-29 bombers in raids against Japan, and attacked targets such as enemy airfields, May-Aug 1945. Between 1953 and 1959 the unit trained for a variety of tactical air missions. Frequently deployed for training exercises, some of them overseas.

=== Lineage ===
- Constituted as 462d Fighter Squadron, Single Engine, on 5 Oct 1944

Activated on 21 Oct 1944
Inactivated on 16 Dec 1945

- Re-designated as 462d Strategic Fighter Squadron on 20 Nov 1952

Activated on 20 Jan 1953
Predesignated as: 462d Fighter-Day Squadron on 1 Jul 1957
Predesignated as: 462d Fighter-Bomber Squadron on 1 Jan 1958
Predesignated as: 462d Tactical Fighter Squadron on 1 Jul 1958
Inactivated on 1 Apr 1959

=== Assignments ===
- 506th Fighter Group, 21 Oct 1944 – 16 Dec 1945
- 506th Strategic Fighter (later, 506 Fighter-Day; 506 Fighter-Bomber; 506 Tactical Fighter) Wing, 20 Jan 1953 – 1 Apr 1959

=== Stations ===
- Lakeland Army Airfield, Florida, 21 Oct 1944 – 16 Feb 1945
- North Field, Iwo Jima, 25 Apr – 3 Dec 1945

Air echelon operated from West Field, Tinian, 23 Mar – 11 May 1945

- Camp Anza, California, 15-16 Dec 1945
- Dow AFB, Maine, 20 Jan 1953
- Tinker AFB, Oklahoma, 20 Mar 1955 – 1 Apr 1959

=== Aircraft ===
- P-51 Mustang, 1944-1945
- F-84 Thunderjet, 1953-1957
- F-100 Super Sabre, 1957-1958
