= 506th Air Expeditionary Group =

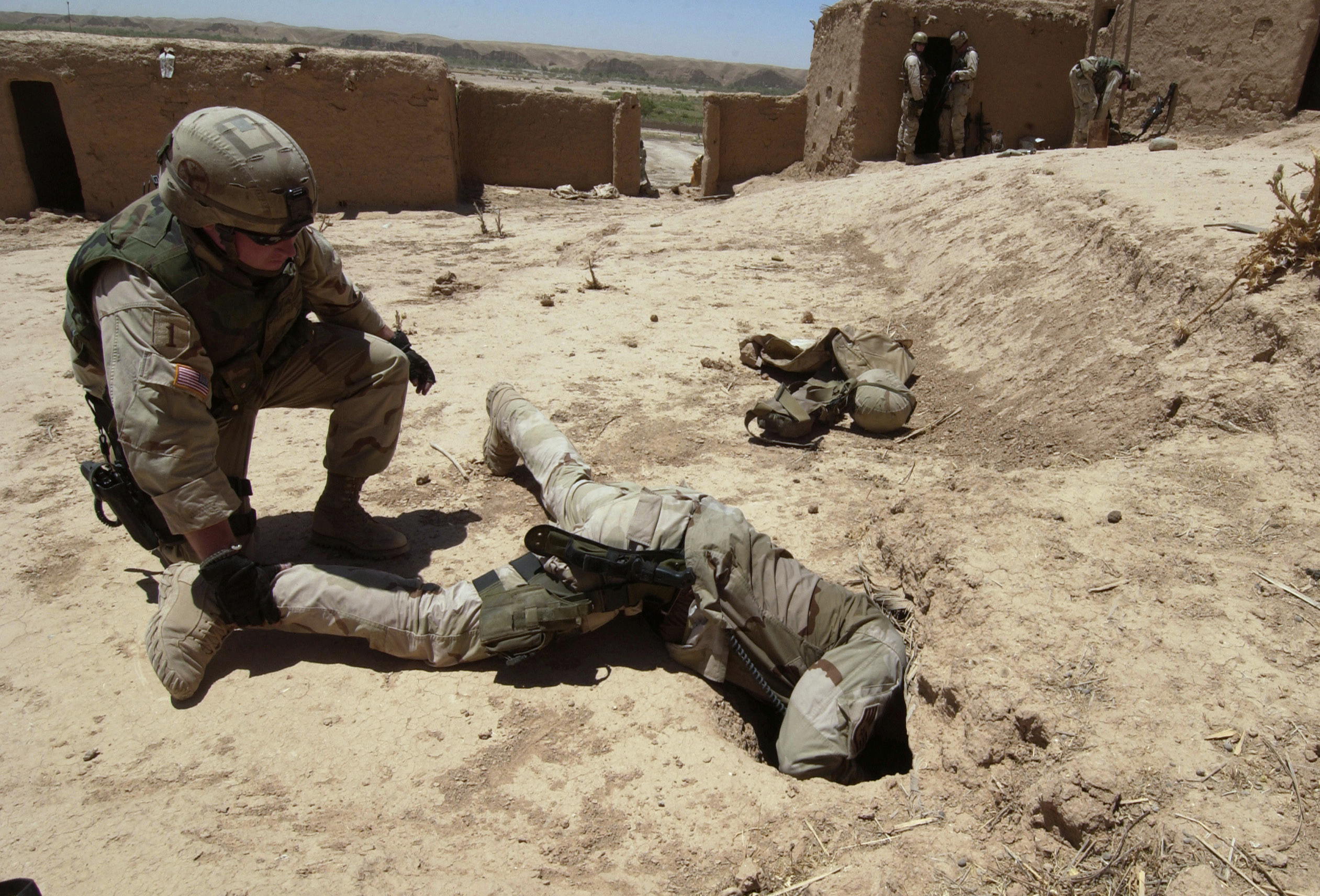
- Members of the group's explosive ordnance disposal team search an underground weapons cache
- Active: 1944–1945; 1952–1959; 1972–1973; 2003–c. 2011
- Country: United States
- Branch: United States Air Force
- Part of: United States Central Command Air Forces
- Engagements: World War II; Asiatic-Pacific Campaign (1944–1945): Global War on Terrorism; Iraq Campaign Liberation of Iraq: 19 March 2003 – 1 May 2003 Transition of Iraq: 2 May 2003 – 28 June 2004 Iraqi Governance: 29 June 2004 – 15 December 2005 National Resolution: 16 December 2005 – 9 January 2007 Iraqi Surge: 10 January 2007 – 31 December 2008 Iraqi Sovereignty: 1 January 2009 – 31 August 2010 New Dawn: 1 September 2010 – 31 December 2011

Insignia
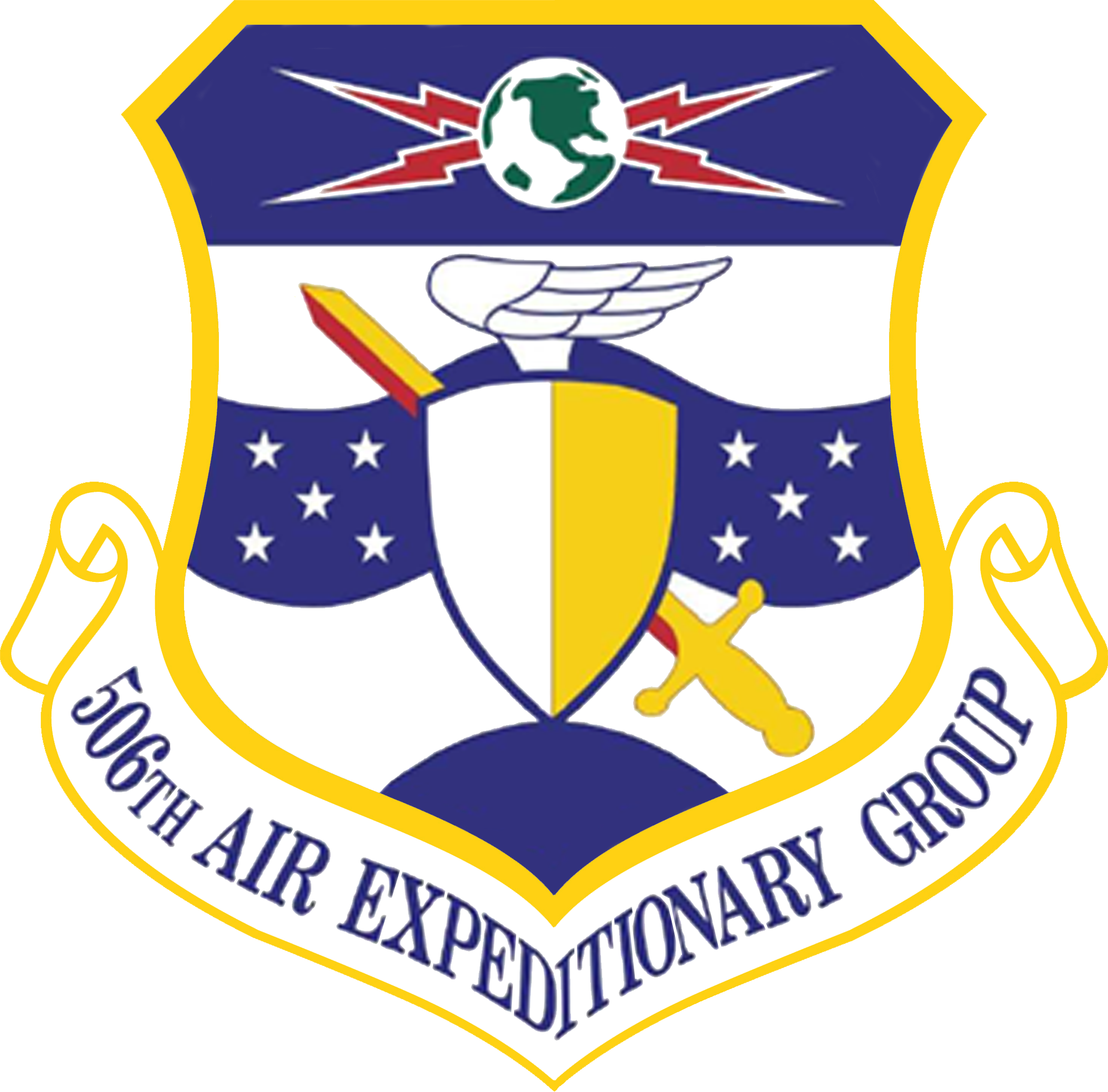
- 506th Air Expeditionary Group emblem

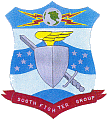
- 506th Strategic Fighter Wing emblem (Note: Approved 21 July 1955)

The 506th Air Expeditionary Group is a provisional United States Air Force unit, assigned to Air Combat Command top activate or inactivate as needed. It was most recently stationed at Kirkuk Airport from 2003 until circa 2011. The group was assigned to the 332d Air Expeditionary Wing, stationed at Joint Base Balad, Iraq.

The 506th secured the base, conducted safe flight operations and fought in the Iraq War. As a provisional unit, the group may be activated or inactivated as needed.

The group began in 1944 as the 506th Fighter Group which flew P-51 Mustangs as part of Twentieth Air Force in the Western Pacific. During the Cold War, the unit was a Strategic Air Command fighter-escort unit and later active with Tactical Air Command and the Air Force Reserve as a tactical fighter unit.

== Units ==
The 506 AEG was composed of:

- 506th Expeditionary Medical Services Squadron
- 506th Expeditionary Civil Engineer Squadron
- 506th Expeditionary Operations Support Squadron
- 506th Expeditionary Logistic Readiness Squadron
- 506th Expeditionary Communications Squadron
- 506th Expeditionary Security Forces Squadron, inactivated 28 May 2010
- 506th Expeditionary Services Squadron
- Kirkuk Provincial Reconstruction Team, or PRT.

Approximately 1,000 active-duty, Reserve, and Air National Guard Airmen were assigned to the 506 AEG during any given Air and Space Expeditionary Force rotation. Additionally, approximately 5,000 Soldiers were assigned to Forward-Operating Base Warrior.

Among the base agencies the 506 AEG actively supported were:

- 52d Expeditionary Flying Training Squadron
- 521st Air Expeditionary Advisory Squadron, advised Iraqi Air Forces' 1st and 3rd Sqdns, inactivated 10 January 2010
- 521st Base Support Unit
- 727th Expeditionary Air Control Squadron, Detachment 1

== History ==
=== World War II ===
The 506th traces its history back to the 506th Fighter Group, Single Engine, which was established on 5 October 1944 and activated on 21 October 1944, at Lakeland Army Air Field, Florida. The group consisted of three squadrons: 457th, 458th and the 462d Fighter Squadrons. From its activation, the planned mission of the 506th was very long range escort missions of B-29 Superfortress bombers in the Pacific Theater.

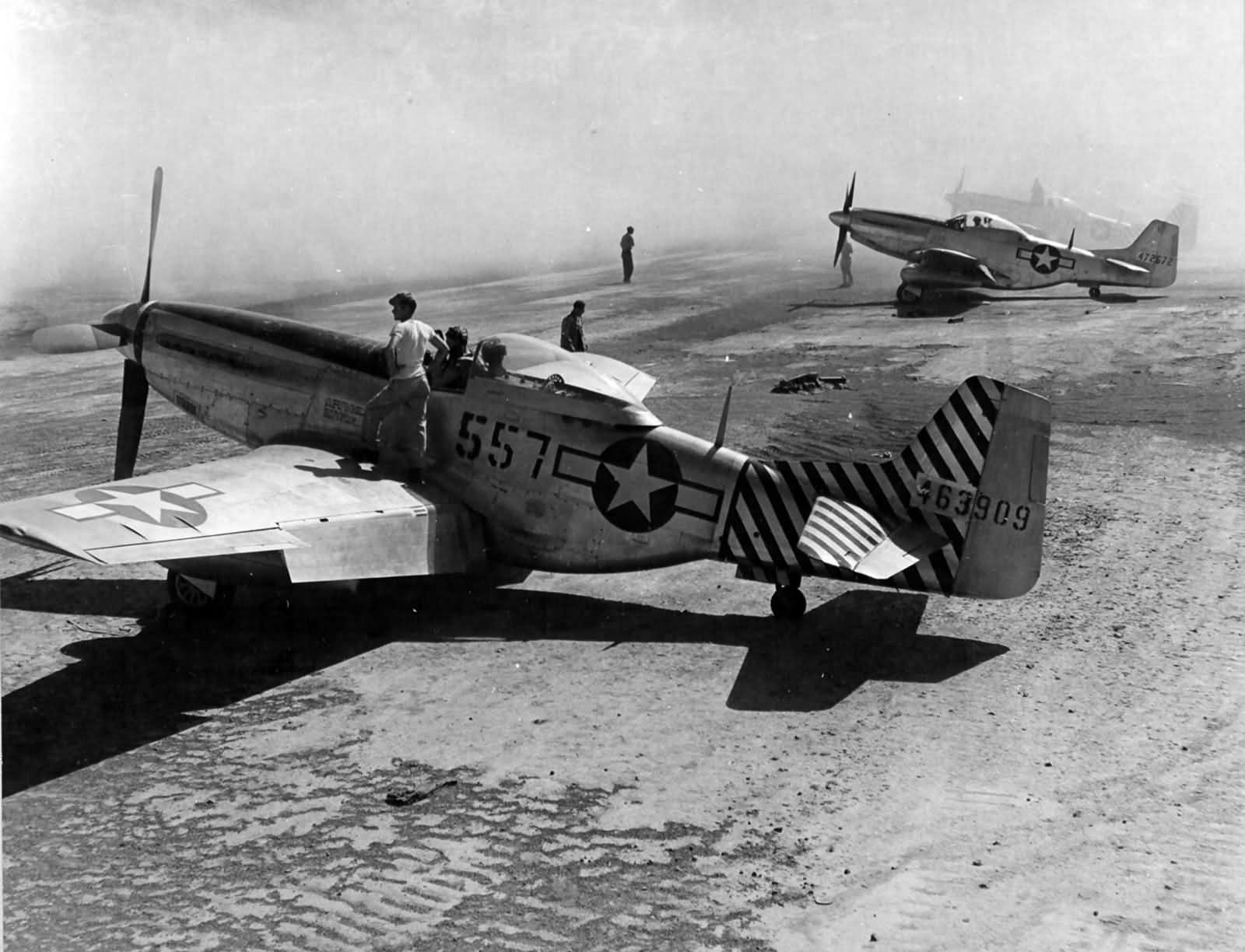
P-51 Mustangs of the 506th FG in North Field

Flying almost all models P-51 Mustang which could be sent to Lakeland for training, the group's training regiment centered on learning cruise control techniques that would produce maximum range from the Mustangs. It also included practice scrambles, assembly and landing procedures, escort formations, aerial gunnery and bombing practice, and an occasional dogfight. A month after the 506th started flying, the USAAF produced document 50–100, which was the training directive for Very Long Range operations. The group had already met many of the requirements by then, two glaring exceptions being instrument flying and rocket firing. The final weeks of training were concentrated on mastering those tasks.

On 19 February 1945 the air echelon of the 506th FG aboard a train bound for California, where the aircraft carrier USS Kalinin Bay was waiting to carry them across the Pacific. The ship delivered the 506th to Guam on 17 March, and a week later the pilots flew their new P-51D-20s to Tinian. There they would stay for seven weeks, flying combat air patrols and practice missions while the field engineers on Iwo Jima prepared North Field for them at the northern end of the island. The group was assigned to Twentieth Air Force, which, in turn, attached the unit to VII Fighter Command 301st Fighter Wing. From Tinian the air echelon flew combat patrol missions under the control of Air Defense Command, Saipan, from 28 March to 28 April 1945.

The air echelon joined the ground echelon at Iwo Jima in May 1945. From Iwo Jima, the 506th's squadrons attacked airfields, antiaircraft emplacements, shipping, barracks, radio and radar stations, railway cars, and other targets in the Bonin Islands and Japan. The group also provided air defense of Iwo Jima and escorted B-29s bombers in raids against Japan.

In December 1945 the group moved to Camp Anza, California, and was inactivated 16 December 1945.

=== Cold War ===
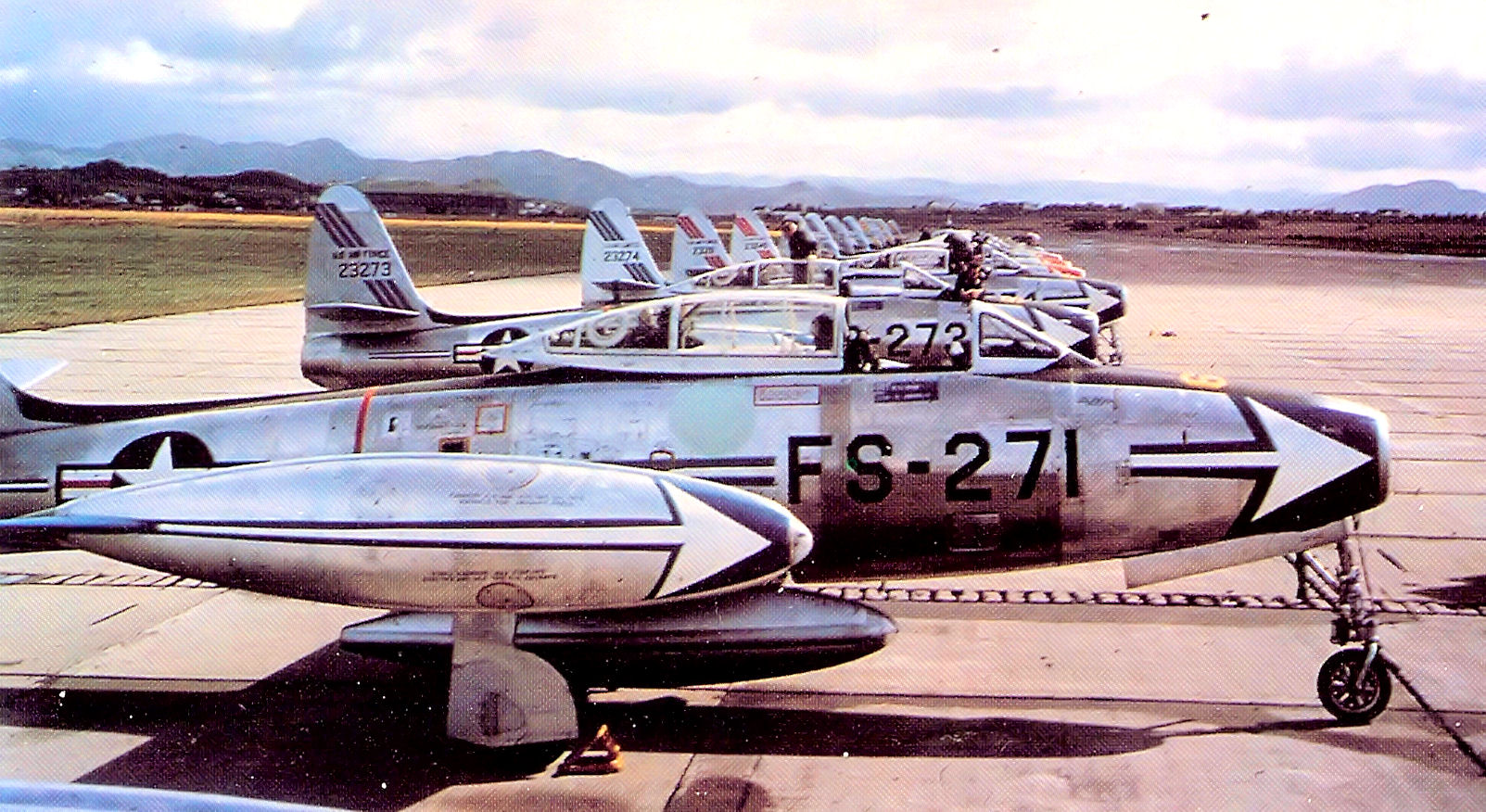
506th Strategic Fighter Wing F-84G Thunderjets 1954

The 506th was established as a Strategic Air Command Strategic Fighter Wing on 20 November 1952 and was assigned to SAC's Eighth Air Force. Activated on 20 January 1953, at Dow Air Force Base, Maine, the wing composed of the 457th, 458th and 462s Strategic Fighter Squadrons and was equipped with F-84G Thunderjets.

SAC was founded by men who had flown bomb raids against Germany during World War II. They usually encountered swarms of enemy fighters and knew the importance of having fighter escorts, so they had fighter wings placed under their own operational control. Although assigned to SAC, the group was associated with Air Defense Command and assisted in providing air defense of Maine.

The wing was deployed to Misawa Air Base, Japan between 13 August and 7 November 1953 to support SAC's rotational deployment of fighter units to northern Japan to perform air defense duties, relieving the 12th Strategic Fighter Wing. Under the self-supporting concept, the 506th SFW gained the KB-29P Superfortress 506th Air Refueling Squadron on 23 September 1953. The 506th ARS remained with the wing until 1 March 1955. Upon the wing's return to the United States, the 508th was re-equipped with new F-84F Thunderstreaks, in January 1954 becoming the first SAC fighter wing to be equipped with the swept-wing model.

The wing remained at Dow for just over a year until being reassigned to Second Air Force and was transferred to Tinker AFB, Oklahoma on 20 March 1955. At Tinker, the wing performed fighter-escort duty training to various SAC B-36 Peacemaker heavy and B-50 medium bomber wings as part of the peacetime readiness training mission of SAC. However, as the new B-47 Stratojet and B-52 Stratofortress bombers came into service, the mission of the fighter-escort wings of SAC became obsolete. The Thunderstreaks simply couldn't keep up with the speed and fly as high as the jet bombers.

In 1956 SAC got out of the fighter business and the 506th was reassigned to Tactical Air Command on 1 July 1957. Under TAC, the wing was redesignated as the 506th Fighter-Day Wing and was re-equipped with new F-100D Super Sabres. From 1957 to 1958 the 506th participated in tactical exercises and rotated squadrons to Europe.

The wing was redesignated as the 506th Tactical Fighter Wing on 1 July 1958 as part of an Air Force-Wide redesignation of units. It was inactivated on 1 April 1959 due to budget constraints.

The 506th was reactivated and redesignated the 506th Tactical Fighter Group on 4 May 1972 and activated in the Air Force Reserve on 8 July 1972 at Carswell Air Force Base, Texas. The group was equipped with F-105 Thunderchiefs, being returned from Vietnam War duty with the 355th Tactical Fighter Wing at Takhli Royal Thai Air Force Base, Thailand. The Thuds assigned were largely war-weary and the model was being phased out of the inventory. The group was inactivated after just about a year of duty on 25 March 1973 as part of the drawdown after the end of United States involvement in Vietnam.

=== Invasion of Iraq ===
The 506th was redesignated the 506th Air Expeditionary Group and converted to provisional status on 22 April 2003, and assigned to Kirkuk AB. The group fought in the Iraq War from 2003 to c.2011-12.

The 506th Air Expeditionary Group was assigned to Kirkuk Regional Air Base on 23 April 2003, nearly one month after Operation Iraqi Freedom started. At that time, the group flew A-10 Thunderbolts, which flew close air support and focused intelligence, surveillance and reconnaissance missions. The last A-10 departed the base in the Spring of 2004.

By May 2006, the unit was attempting to discuss turnover of base fence guard and other associated duties to the New Iraqi Army, Iraqi National Police, and an Iraqi strategic/security infrastructure unit that was in the area. However, the U.S. Air Force still retained forces to guard the base. Only in late May 2010 were guard duties transferred to the 1st Special Troops Battalion, 1st Brigade Combat Team, 1st Armored Division (Ready First Combat Team) of the United States Army. On 28 May 2010 the 506th Expeditionary Security Forces Squadron was inactivated.

== Lineage ==
506th Air Expeditionary Group
Constituted as 506th Fighter Group, Single Engine on 5 October 1944
Activated on 21 October 1944
Inactivated on 16 December 1945
Redesignated 506th Tactical Fighter Group on 4 May 1972
Activated in the reserve on 8 July 1972
Inactivated on 25 March 1973
Consolidated with the 506th Tactical Fighter Wing on 31 January 1984
Redesignated 506th Air Expeditionary Group and converted to provisional status on 22 April 2003
Activated on 22 Apri 2003
Inactivated c. 2011
506th Tactical Fighter Wing
Established as 506th Strategic Fighter Wing on 20 November 1952
Activated on 20 January 1953
Redesignated 506th Fighter-Day Wing on 1 July 1957
Redesignated 506th Fighter-Bomber Wing on 1 January 1958
Redesignated 506th Tactical Fighter Wing on 1 July 1958
Inactivated on 1 April 1959
Consolidated with the 506th Tactical Fighter Group on 31 January 1984

=== Assignments ===
- III Fighter Command, 21 October 1944 – 16 February 1945
- 301st Fighter Wing, 24 April – 3 December 1945
- Army Service Forces, 15–16 December 1945
- Eighth Air Force, 20 January 1953. Attached to 39th Air Division [Defense], 13 August – 7 November 1953
- Second Air Force, 1 April 1955
- Ninth Air Force, 1 July 1957
- Eighteenth Air Force, 1 October 1957
- Twelfth Air Force, 1 January 1958 – 1 April 1959
- 301st Tactical Fighter Wing, 8 July 1972 – 25 March 1973
- Air Combat Command to activate or inactivate any time after 22 April 2003
  - 332d Air Expeditionary Wing, 22 April 2003 ~ c. 2011

=== Components ===
- 457th Fighter (later Strategic Fighter; Fighter-Day; Fighter-Bomber) Squadron, 21 October 1944 – 16 December 1945; 20 January 1953 – 1 April 1959 (detached 20 March–c. 19 August 1958)
- 458th Fighter (later Strategic Fighter; Fighter-Day; Fighter-Bomber) Squadron, 21 October 1944 – 16 December 1945; 20 January 1953 – 1 April 1959 (detached c. 13 August 1958–c. 18 February 1959)
- 462d Fighter (later Strategic Fighter; Fighter-Day; Fighter-Bomber) Squadron, 21 October 1944 – 16 December 1945; 20 January 1953 – 1 April 1959.
- 470th Fighter-Day (later Fighter-Bomber) Squadron, 25 September 1957 – 1 April 1959
- 506th Air Refueling Squadron: 25 September 1953 – 1 March 1955

=== Stations ===
- Lakeland Army Air Field (later Drane Field), Florida, 21 October 1944 – 16 February 1945
- North Field, Iwo Jima, 24 April – 3 December 1945
- Camp Anza, California, 15–16 December 1945
- Dow Air Force Base, Maine, 20 January 1953
- Tinker Air Force Base, Oklahoma, 20 March 1955 – 1 April 1959
- Carswell Air Force Base, Texas, 8 July 1972 – 25 March 1973
- Kirkuk Air Base (later Joint Base Balad), Iraq, since 22 April 2003

=== Aircraft ===
- P-51 Mustang, 1944–1945
- F-84 Thunderjet, 1953–1957
- KB-29 Superfortress (Tanker), 1954–1955
- F-100 Super Sabre, 1957–1958
- F-105 Thunderchief, 1972–1973

== See also ==
- List of B-29 Superfortress operators
