= Lakeland Army Air Field =

United States Army Airfield

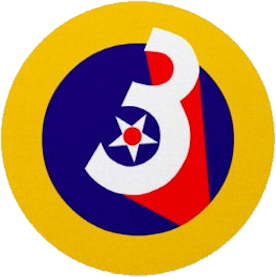
Lakeland Army Airfield Drane Field
- Part of Third Air Force
- Located near: Lakeland, Florida
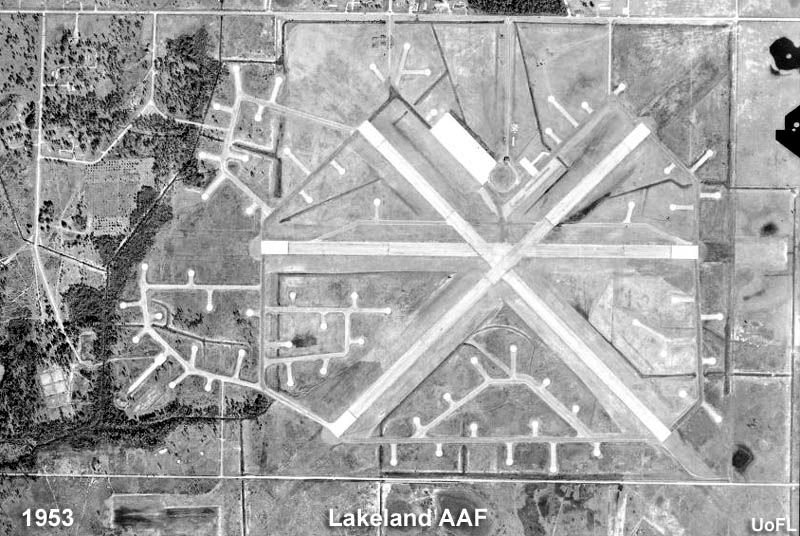
- Lakeland Army Airfield in 1953, at that time unused and in its World War II configuration.

Location
- Coordinates: 27°59′20″N 082°01′07″W

Site history
- In use: 1942-1945

Lakeland Army Airfield, was a World War II United States Army Air Force located 5.3 miles southwest of Lakeland, Florida. From 1960 to 2017 it was Lakeland Linder Regional Airport. In 2017 it was renamed Lakeland Linder International Airport.

== History ==
=== Origins ===
On May 22, 1941, the Lakeland City Commission passed a Resolution naming the Lakeland Airport No. 2, which was under construction, Drane Field in honor of Herbert J. Drane, one of Lakeland's outstanding citizens.

The city had barely begun work on the new airport when, with war already raging in Europe, it leased the under-construction facility to the War Department. The U. S. Army Corps of Engineers improved and expanded the three runways, into a star-shaped pattern of 5000x150 feet (NE/SW), 5000x150 feet (E/W), and 5000x150 feet (NW/SE), along with a series of taxiways, dispersal parking hardstands, hangar ramp, and constructed the necessary buildings to operate a training facility to instruct U.S. Army Air Forces pilots and flight crews to fly combat bombers and fighters.

In early May 1942, enough construction was completed to dedicate the new military base, named Lakeland Army Air Field. The base was assigned to the Third Air Force, III Bomber Command, and the 60th Flying Training Detachment (Medium Bombardment) was activated to manage the base facilities. Lakeland AAF was subsequently assigned as a sub-base to MacDill Field in nearby Tampa.

In May 1942, however, the airfield was not yet ready to support the flying training mission. Construction delays limited the operational use of the field, and Air Service Command (ASC) used the base station as a staging area for organizing, training and deploying Service Groups to overseas theaters.

=== III Bomber Command ===
The first flying unit to arrive at Lakeland AAF was the Martin B-26 Marauder-equipped 320th Bombardment Group with three squadrons of aircraft and personnel. It was moved from MacDill Field at the beginning of August 1942 and was sent to Lakeland for 2d phase combat training to alleviate congestion in the Tampa Bay airspace. Training was cut off in late August 1942 and the 320th subsequently deployed to Twelfth Air Force, then located in England, for final training. The unit was urgently needed in England for staging prior to the Operation Torch landings, engaging in combat during the North African Campaign beginning in December 1942.

The next unit, arriving shortly afterwards, was the 322d Bombardment Group, also moving up from MacDill Field for 2d phase combat training, arriving in late September. The 322d remained at Lakeland until November 1942 before deploying also to England and assignment to the Eighth Air Force, attacking Nazi airfields and targets in Occupied Europe.

The 344th Bombardment Group arrived at Lakeland AAF in late December 1942 and was assigned by III Bomber Command to be an Operational Training Unit for the B-26 Marauder school. Throughout 1943, the 344th received new graduates from the Air Training Command's twin-engine flight schools and provided transition and combat training to pilots and new flight crews assembled from various USAAF technical schools. After transition training, graduates were sent to newly-forming units for combat training.

The 557th Bombardment Squadron, which had been transferred from MacDill Field, arrived at Lakeland AAF on 12 April 1943. The 557th had been undergoing training with its parent 387th Bombardment Group at MacDill and was also sent to Lakeland for 2d phase combat training to alleviate congestion in the Tampa Bay airspace. After about a month of training, the squadron left for Godman Field, Kentucky on 12 May to complete its combat training.

In October 1943, the 407th Fighter-Bomber Group (Dive) was moved to Lakeland AAF from the III Fighter Command base at Drew Army Airfield, also located in Tampa approximately 8 miles northwest of MacDill Field. The 407th had been deployed to Alaska in July to engage Japanese Forces in the Aleutian Campaign with Douglas A-24 Dauntless dive bombers, a USAAF version of the USN/USMC SBD Dauntless. The A-24s, although well-suited for naval carrier operations, were not well-suited for Army Air Force missions. Upon their arrival at Lakeland, the 407th was re-equipped with the new A-36 Apache ground attack aircraft, a variant of the P-51 Mustang fighter. The unit was then reassigned to Galveston Army Airfield, Texas, where it became a training unit.

In late 1943, when Second Air Force began transitioning to B-29 Superfortress training, and the 344th was moved Hunter Field, Georgia for combat training and transitioning to an operational group. It deployed with the Ninth Air Force to England in February 1944 for combat duties and the medium bomber training mission at Lakeland AAF was changed to B-17 Flying Fortress heavy bomber training. The 463d Bombardment Group arrived at Lakeland from MacDill on 3 January 1944 for final Level 3 combat training. The group remained at Lakeland for about a month before deploying to the Fifteenth Air Force in Italy in early February.

It was soon found that Lakeland AAF was not suitable for B-17 training because the asphalt runways could not withstand the weight of the heavy bombers, and the 463d was the first and last heavy bomber group to train at Lakeland. The A-20 Havoc-equipped 410th Bombardment Group was moved from Laurel Army Airfield, Mississippi to operate from Lakeland AAF in early February 1944 as part of the Army Air Forces School of Applied Tactics headquartered at Orlando Army Air Base. The A-20 light bombers took part in practice combat maneuvers at part of the combat training school, designed to develop new tactics and combat maneuvers.

=== III Fighter Command ===
The AAFSAT training mission ended in mid-March 1944, when Lakeland was officially reassigned to III Fighter Command. Air Service Command, which has been using Lakeland as a staging base for new Service Units, remained at Lakeland after the transfer to Fighter Command. The 352d Army Air Forces Base Unit (Replacement, Fighter), was activated at the base as a replacement personnel training unit. With the transfer to Fighter Command, Lakeland became a main operating base for Third Air Force.

A different mission of sorts was ordered by III Fighter Command, the training of Air Commando fighter units for the China Burma India Theater and the invasion of Burma. Air Commando units were formed to be part of the invasion force to operate from captured Japanese airfields behind the main battle lines in India. Parachutists would be dropped on enemy held fields, and quickly the Allies would fly in fighter and transport units to operate from those fields. As the battle moved further east, the commandos would jump ahead and establish new bases. In each case the pattern had been the same: spot open spaces from the air, send in glider-borne engineers and equipment to hack an airstrip from the brush, and within a matter of hours, fly in troops to harass the enemy and his lines of communication with P-51 Mustang fighter and B-25 medium bomber units.

The 3d Air Commando Group arrived for training in early May 1944 after being formed and organized at Drew Field. Equipped with new P-51D Mustangs, the group's three combat squadrons underwent training at Lakeland. It moved to Alachua Army Airfield, near Gainesville in late August. A succession of Air Commando units were trained at Lakeland during the late summer of 1944. Both P-51-equipped fighter squadrons as well as light observation aircraft squadrons received training prior to their deployment to Burma.

With the Air Commando training completed, the 457th and 462d Fighter Squadron were formed by III Fighter Command at Lakeland in late October 1944. Part of the new 506th Fighter Group, the squadrons were programmed for long-distance P-51D Mustang missions in the Pacific Theater to engage in both B-29 Superfortress escort missions as well as ground attack missions over the Japanese Home Islands. The squadrons were formed, equipped and trained with new personnel and aircraft at Lakeland, being deployed to the Pacific in mid February 1945.

=== Closure ===
The training mission ended with the departure of the P-51 squadrons for the Pacific, and the 352d AAFBU was inactivated at the end of February. The Air Service Command mission continued however, and the airfield remained open; mostly seeing transient training aircraft from various training bases in Florida and South Georgia. The number of personnel were reduced, being reassigned to other bases, and in mid-April 1945, orders were received from Third Air Force that Lakeland Army Airfield would be closed on 30 April 1945 and placed in a standby status.

The facility was subsequently transferred to Air Technical Service Command, and buildings and equipment were sold with any useful military equipment being transferred to other bases around the country. The base was declared as surplus in 1946 and was turned over to the War Assets Administration (WAA) for disposal and return to civil use, subsequently being returned to the City of Lakeland.

The facility, however, was vastly larger in scope with large numbers of support buildings and other improvements than the one leased to the War Department in 1940. After the war ended, the Army Airfield was left mostly unused due to the size of the facility far exceeding the needs of the city as well as the costs involved of converting it to civil use.

Drane Field, was essentially abandoned for the next decade. With the closure of Lodwick Aircraft at Lodwick Field in the mid-1950s, the city had decided to close it as a municipal airport in the summer of 1957 and concentrate its resources on Drane Field in south Lakeland. After several years of new construction and conversion to a civil airport, it was rededicated as Lakeland Municipal Airport in 1960. Today, the facility is known as Lakeland Linder International Airport with two of the original three runways still in service, one having been lengthened to 8500 feet. A new airport passenger terminal complex was constructed in the early 2000s and is home to several plaques, monuments and other memorabilia commemorating the airfield's World War II history as a U.S. Army Air Forces installation.

== Major units assigned ==
Air Service Command

- 323d Service Group (1942)
- 324th Service Group (1942)
- 40th Service Group, 1 January 1944-

Re-designated: 4501 Army Air Forces Base Unit (Service Group), 1 March 1944-April 1945

III Bomber Command

- 60th Flying Training Detachment (Medium Bombardment)
- 320th Bombardment Group 8–28 August 1942, (B-26, 3d Level Training)
- 322d Bombardment Group 22 September–November 1942, (B-26, 3d Level Training)
- 344th Bombardment Group, 28 December 1942 – 19 December 1943 (B-26 OTU)
- 557th Bombardment Squadron, 12 April-12 May 1943 (B-26, 2d Level Training)
- 407th Fighter-Bomber Group (Dive), 2 October-9 November 1943 (A-36 OTU)
- 463d Bombardment Group, 3 January-2 February 1944 (B-17 3d Level Training)

Army Air Forces School of Applied Tactics

- 410th Bombardment Group (Light), 8 February-13 March 1944 (A-20)

III Fighter Command

- 352d Army Air Forces Base Unit (Replacement, Fighter), 1 May 1944-March 1945
- 3d Air Commando Group, 5 May-20 August 1944
- 1st Fighter Squadron (Commando), 22 August-23 October 1944 (P-51)
- 2d Fighter Squadron (Commando), 22 August-23 October 1944 (P-51)
- 127th Liaison Squadron (Commando), 22 August-23 October 1944
- 155th Liaison Squadron (Commando), 22 August-23 October 1944
- 156th Liaison Squadron (Commando), 22 August-23 October 1944
- 457th Fighter Squadron, 21 October 1944 – 16 February 1945 (P-51)
- 462d Fighter Squadron, 21 October 1944 – 16 February 1945 (P-51)

== Triple cross ==
The three runways intersect at three points rather than a single "triple cross" so that repairs or cleaning can be carried out at one of the intersections, while one runway remains usable.

== See also ==
- Florida World War II Army Airfields
