= South Field (Iwo Jima) =

WW2 air field in Iwo Jima, Japan

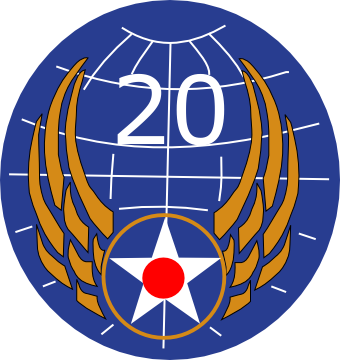
South Field (Iwo Jima) Motoyama No. 1 Chidori Field
- Part of Twentieth Air Force
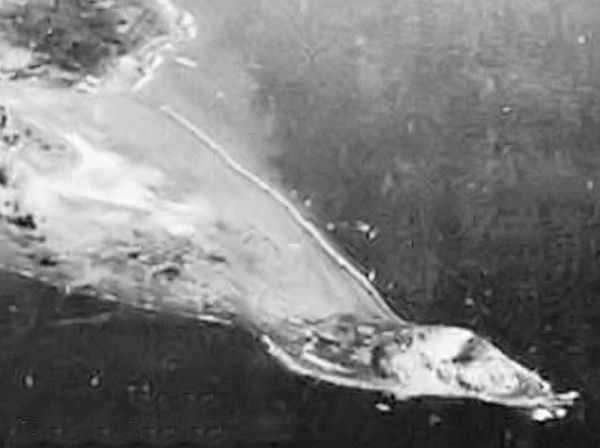
- South Field, Iwo Jima, February 1945

Site information
- Type: Military Airfield
- Controlled by: United States Army Air Forces

Location
- Coordinates: 24°45′46″N 141°18′13″E

Site history
- Built: Prior to 1944
- In use: 1944–1955

South Field was a World War II airfield on Iwo Jima in the Volcano Islands, located in the Central Pacific. The Volcano Islands are part of Japan. The airfield was located on the southern corner of Iwo Jima located on the Motoyama plateau, to the north of Mount Suribachi. South Field was significant to the overall Battle of Iwo Jima.

== History ==
Built by the Japanese, the base included two runways, one 5,025 feet (1,532 m) and the other 3,965 feet (1,209 m). On 2 January 1944, more than a dozen B-24 Liberator bombers raided Airfield No. 1 and inflicted heavy damage. Commander of the island, Lieutenant General Tadamichi Kuribayashi diverted more than 600 men, 11 trucks, and 2 bulldozers for immediate repairs. As a result, the airfield again became operational after only twelve hours. It was used by the Japanese until 19 February 1945 when the United States Marines landed on the island. It was the assignment of the 133rd Naval Construction Battalion to get this airfield operational as soon as the Marines had secured it. By the time that happened the 133rd had taken so many casualties supporting the 23rd Marines that the assignment was first given to the 31st CB but the 62nd CB ended up with it. Even so, all three battalions worked together to get it operational.

It was during the fight to secure this airfield that Medal of Honor recipient Gunnery Sergeant John Basilone was killed by a Japanese mortar shell.

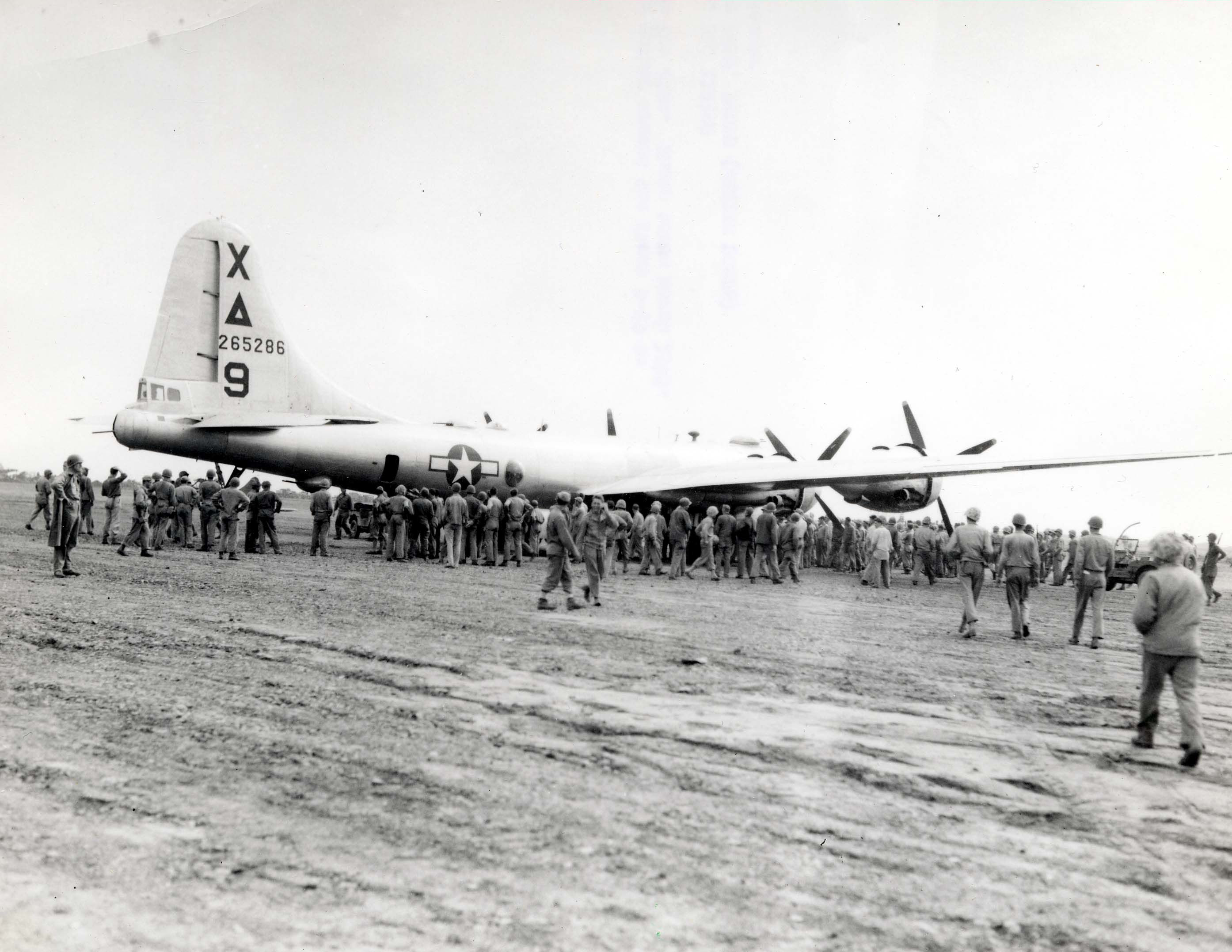
4 March 1945: Dinah Might was the first B-29 to make an emergency landing on Iwo Jima. Greeted by a thousand Marines and Seebees, she was repaired, refueled and flown out of South Field while the fighting was still going on.

The airfield became a battlefield during the Battle of Iwo Jima. It was put into action by the Americans as the battle still raged. Named South Field, the east-northeast to west-southwest runway was being used by observation planes as early as 26 February (D plus 7) when the first American aircraft landed on the strip, an OY-1 Sentinel piloted by Lt. Harvey Olson of VMO-4. By 2 March the runway had been graded to 4,000 feet (1,200 m). Later, on 4 March with the battle still raging a B-29 Superfortress named Dinah Might from the 9th Bombardment Group (Very Heavy) landed, the first of 2,400 emergency landings by American aircraft at South Field and North Field on Iwo Jima.

On 6 March, the P-51 Mustangs of the 15th Fighter Group moved to the field for close air support for the ongoing battle and long-range B-29 fighter escort operations. From then on, South Field was in constant use.

On 16 March, US Navy PB4Y-1's (Navy version of the B-24) patrol bombers of VPB-116 arrived at this airfield from Tinian. The patrol bombers performed various missions from South Field through the remainder of the war. The PB4Y-1 were later relieved by PB4Y-2 aircraft.

On 7 April 1945, P-51s took off from South Field to form the first land-based fighter escort for B-29s on a strike against the Japanese homeland. By July, the runway had been extended to 6,000 feet (1,800 m) by 200 feet (61 m) and had been surfaced with emulsified asphalt. Also constructed were 7,950 feet (2,420 m) of taxiways and 258 hardstands. This field could accommodate 100 P-51s and 30 B-24 Liberators. In an emergency, B-29s could land here. Fighter escort operations took place from March until November 1945.

On 16 July 1945 the 21st Fighter Group moved to the field from Central Field.

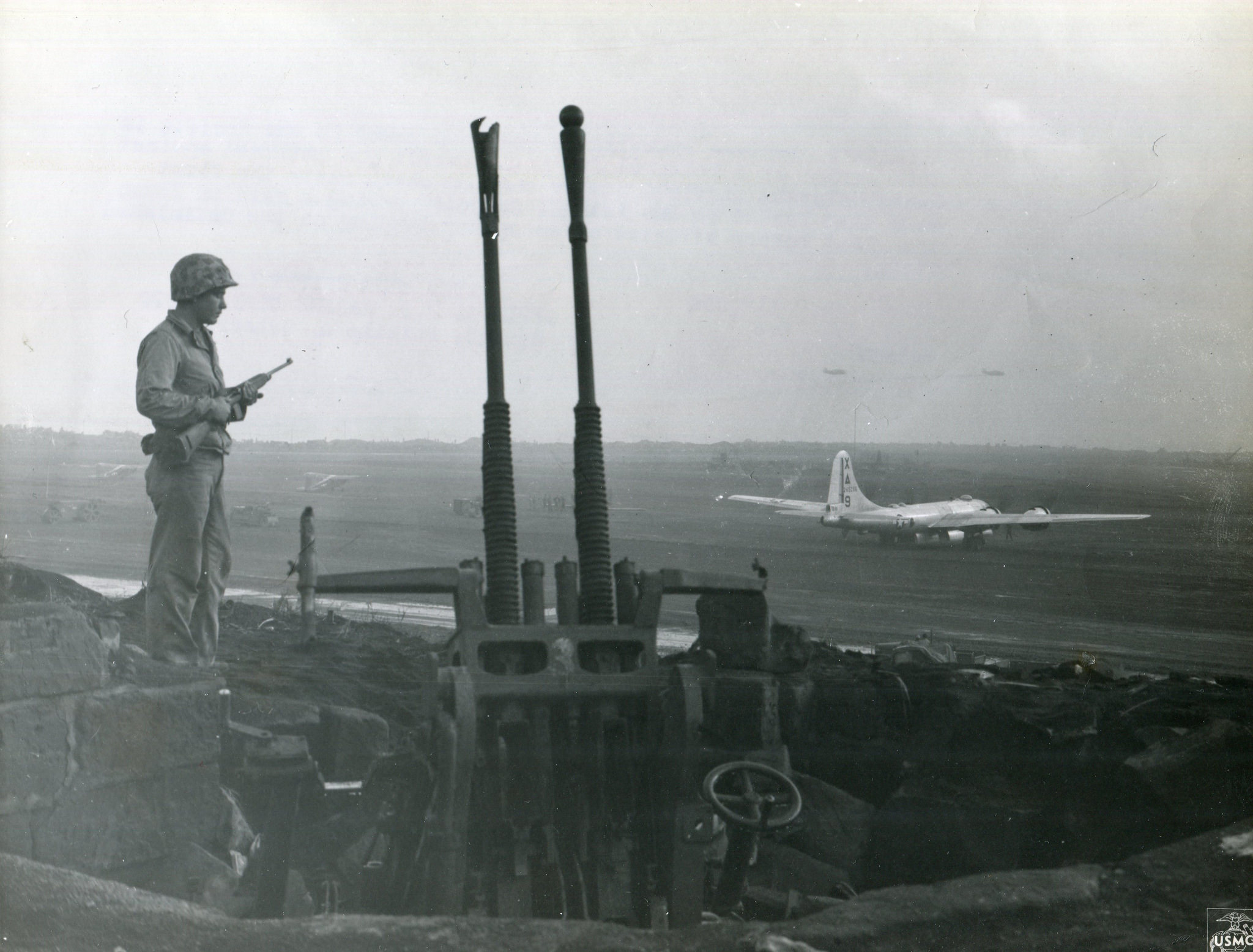
Marine at a Japanese antiaircraft gun overlooking Motoyama No 1 airfield

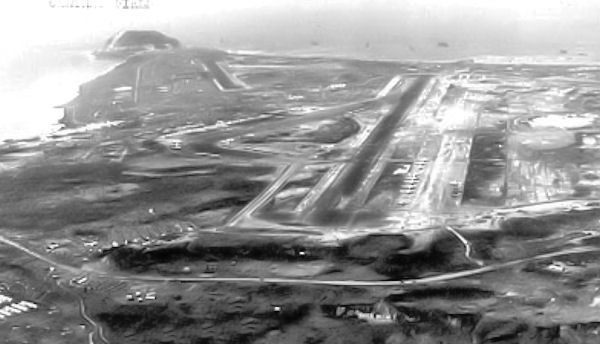
South and Central Fields Iwo Jima 1945

After the war, the 20th Air Force fighter squadrons moved out to Japan, Okinawa or Philippines and South Field came under the Jurisdiction of Military Air Transport Service (MATS), becoming a refueling stop for MATS aircraft in the Western Pacific. It hosted various communications, weather as well as Far East Materiel Command units for supply and maintenance activities. It was under the command of the Iwo Jima Base Command, as a satellite of the 6000th Support Wing, Tachikawa Air Base, Japan.

The USAF 6415th Air Base Squadron garrisoned the base until turning over the facility to the Japanese government on 30 September 1955. The airfield was subsequently abandoned and of the three WWII airfields only Central Field remains in use.

== See also ==
- Battle of Iwo Jima
- Central Field (Iwo Jima)
- USAAF in the Central Pacific
- Naval Base Iwo Jima

== Bibliography ==
- Maurer, Maurer (1983). Air Force Combat Units of World War II. Maxwell AFB, Alabama: Office of Air Force History. ISBN 0892010924.
