= Central Field (Iwo Jima) =

WW2 airfield in Iwo Jima, Japan

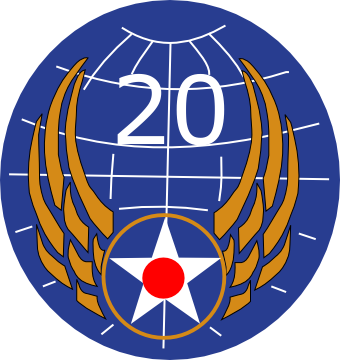
Central Field (Iwo Jima) Motoyama No. 2 Airfield No. 2
- Part of Twentieth Air Force
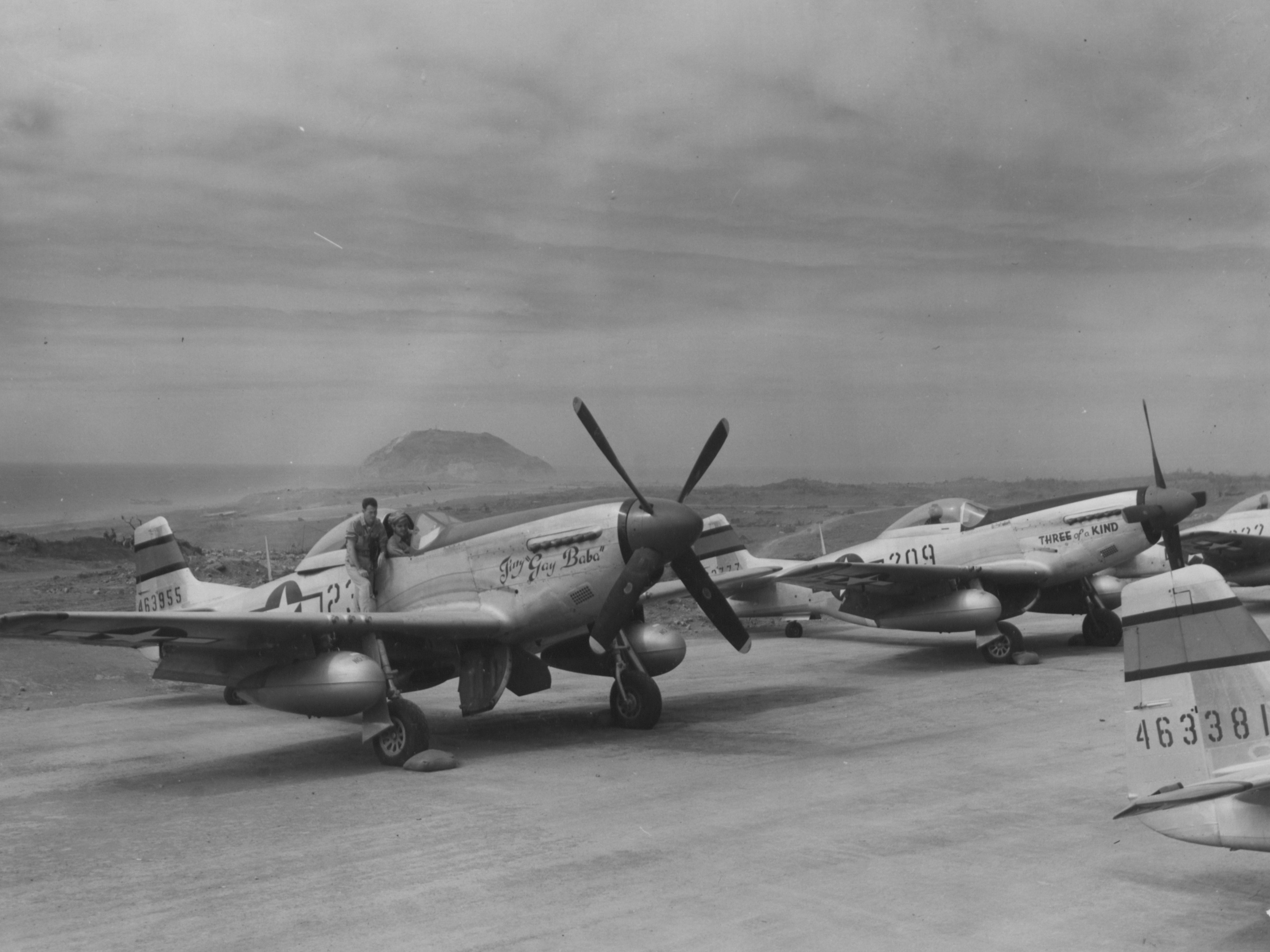
- P-51Ds of the 21st Fighter Group at Central Field Iwo Jima 1945, Note Mount Suribachi in the background.

Site information
- Type: Military airfield
- Controlled by: Japan Maritime Self-Defense Force (IATA: IWO, ICAO: RJAW)

Location
- Coordinates: 24°47′05″N 141°19′27″E

Site history
- Built: Prior to 1944
- In use: 1944–present

Iwo Jima Air Base Iwoto Field Iwoto Airport
- IATA: IWO; ICAO: RJAW

Summary
- Airport type: Military
- Owner: Ministry of Defense, Japan
- Operator: Japan Maritime Self-Defense Force
- Location: Iwo Jima, Ogasawara, Tokyo
- Elevation AMSL: 388 ft (118 m)
- Coordinates: 24°47′03″N 141°19′21″E

Map
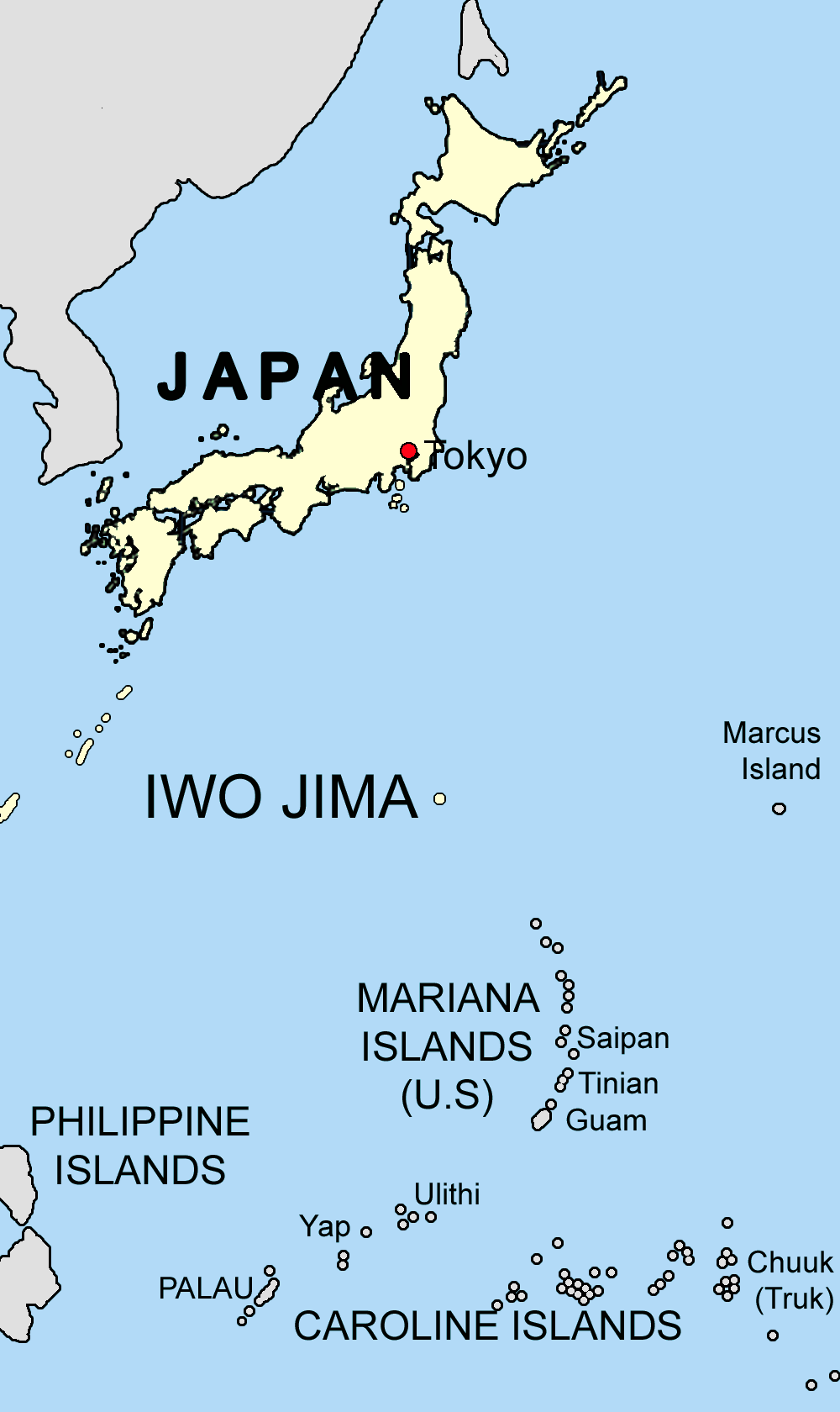
- Location in Japan

Runways
Direction	Length		Surface
Direction	m	ft	Surface
07/25	2,650	8,694	Asphalt

Central Field or Iwo Jima Air Base (IATA: IWO, ICAO: RJAW) is a former World War II airfield on Iwo Jima in the Bonin Islands, located in the Central Pacific. The Bonin Islands are part of Japan. Today, the base is the only airfield on the island, operated by the Japan Self-Defense Forces.

== History ==
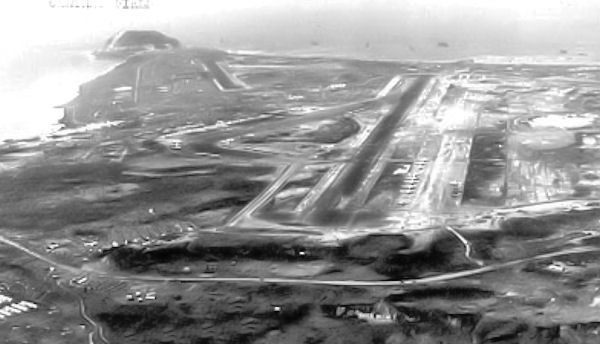
South (upper left) and Central (center) Fields Iwo Jima 1945

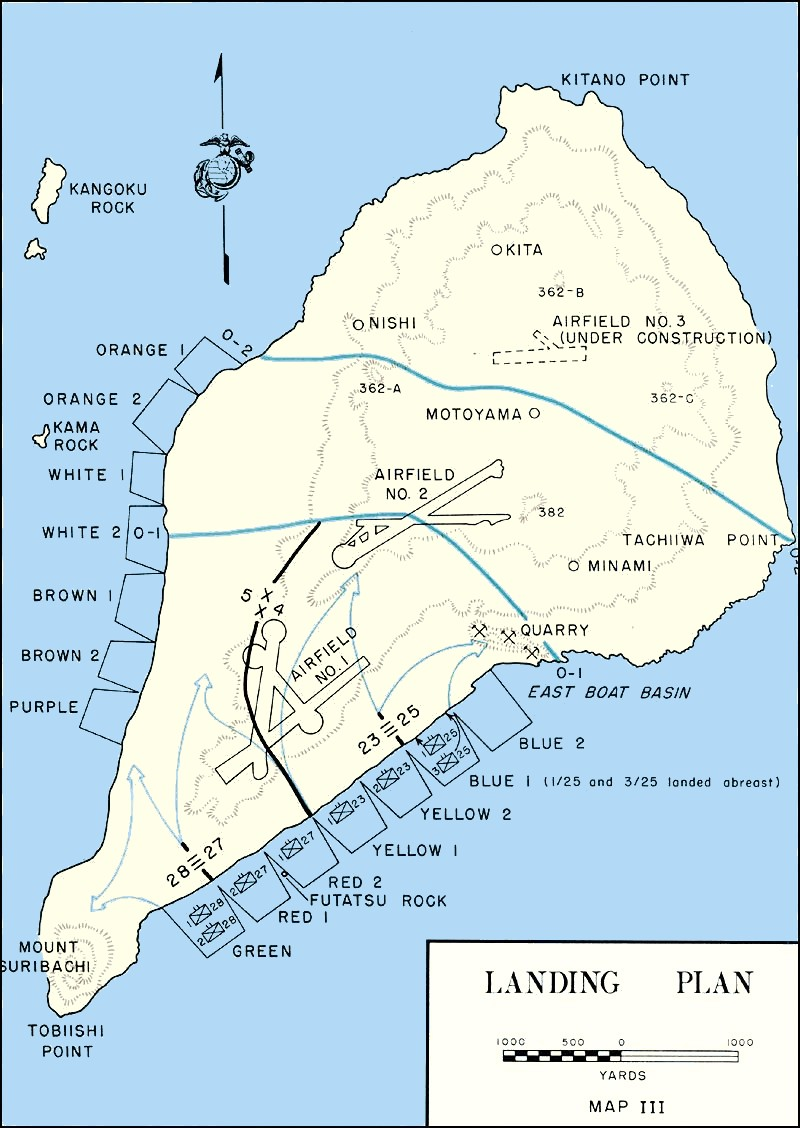
Diagram for the assault on the island; South, Central, and North Fields are labeled as Airfields 1, 2, and 3 respectively

The Japanese had constructed the airfield near the center of island laid out as an "X" of two intersecting runways one 5,225 feet (1,593 m) and the other 4,425 feet (1,349 m).

Located south and west of the midpoint between Tokyo and Saipan, the island of Iwo Jima was needed by the United States Army Air Forces as an emergency landing site for its B-29 Superfortress strategic bombing campaign against the Empire of Japan. The purpose of the assault was to take the island for the three Japanese airfields so that the U.S. Navy Seabees could turn them in to United States facilities. Prior to the assault NCB 133 was assigned to get the southern Motoyama #1 airfield operational and NCB 31 was assigned the central Motoyama #2. On D-plus 5 that was changed because of the casualties the 133rd had taken and the 31st CB was assigned to Motoyama #1. On D-plus 6 the assignments were changed again. The 62nd CB attached to the reserve in V Amphibious Corps was given Motoyama #1, the 31st CB was given Motoyama #2 and the 133rd was given the barely started Motoyama #3. However, the Seabees and elements of the 2nd Separate Engineer Battalion worked together until the Marine ground forces had taken possession of their respective airfield construction assignments.

Reconstruction and expansion work was held up by the protracted land battle, on 16 March the airfield, named Central Field, became operational, with the east-northeast to west-southwest runway graded to 5,200 feet (1,600 m) and the east–west runway to 4,800 feet (1,500 m). A second runway parallel to the east-northeast to west-southwest runway was also built; both were built to accommodate B-29s. By 7 July 1945, the first B-29 runway had been paved to 8,500 feet (2,600 m) and placed in operation. During the day, 102 B-29s, returning from a raid on Japan, landed on the field. Several sub-grade failures occurred in the construction because of ground water and soft spots in the sub-grade. In some places the paving sealed off steam which had been generated below the surface and when the steam condensed, the sub-grade became saturated. By 12 July, the B-29 runway had been completed and paved for a length of 9,800 feet (3,000 m) by 200 feet (61 m). The parallel runway was eventually lengthened to 9,400 feet (2,900 m), both with a width of 200 feet (61 m). The east–west runway was developed into a fueling strip, 6,000 feet (1,800 m) by 570 feet (170 m), with 60 fueling outlets. For normal operations, this field could accommodate 120 P-51 Mustangs, 30 B-24 Liberators and 20 B-29s.

Central Field was headquarters for VII Fighter Command of the Twentieth Air Force from March 1 – December 1, 1945, along with the intelligence-gathering 41st Photographic Reconnaissance Squadron from August though mid-September 1945. Operational fighter squadrons which performed B-29 escort missions from Central Field were:

- 506th Fighter Group, April 24 – December 3, 1945
- 414th Fighter Group, July 7 – December 23, 1945
- 21st Fighter Group, March 26 - July 16, 1945
- 548th Night Fighter Squadron, March 5 – June 12, 1945
- 549th Night Fighter Squadron, (Ground Echelon), March 14, 1945 – February 5, 1946

After the war, the 20th Air Force fighter squadrons moved out to Japan, Okinawa or the Philippines and Central Field came under the Jurisdiction of Military Air Transport Service (MATS), becoming a refueling stop for MATS aircraft in the Western Pacific. It hosted various communications, weather as well as Far East Materiel Command units for supply and maintenance activities. It was under the command of the Iwo Jima Base Command, as a satellite of the 6000th Support Wing, Tachikawa Air Base, Japan.

The third incomplete Japanese airfield (Motoyama No. 3) 24°47′37″N 141°19′29″E was built as the "North Field". It required much new construction in rough terrain which consisted principally of consolidated volcanic ash. The initial portion of the work in preparing the sub-grade for the runway entailed the moving of about 200,000-cubic-yards (152,911-cubic-meters) of rock and volcanic ash. Seabee construction was stopped on 27 April and the project was turned over to a USAAF aviation engineer battalion for completion. By V-J Day a runway 6,000 feet (1,800 m) long, had been graded and was paved to 5,500 feet (1,700 m); 10,000 feet (3,000 meters) of taxiways had been graded; and 129 fighter hardstands provided. This field could normally accommodate 50 P-51s and 14 B-24s (and eight B-29s in an emergency). North Field was abandoned after the war; its facilities were used for revetments and munitions storage in support of the other two airfields.

Central Field stayed in American hands until being turned over to the Japanese Government on 27 June 1968. It then became a navigation and weather station of the Japan Maritime Self-Defense Force (Nihon Kaijo Jieitai), and is still used by the U.S. military as an aircraft refueling depot and as a U.S. Navy special pilot training facility.

At any given time about 350 JSDF personnel are posted to Iwo Jima and though the airfield is strictly for military use, commercial flights carrying veterans are frequent visitors.

Of the three WWII airfields, Central Field is the only one that remains in use today.

== See also ==
- USAAF in the Central Pacific
- South Field (Iwo Jima)
- Naval Base Iwo Jima
