= John C. H. Lee =

American army general (1887–1958)

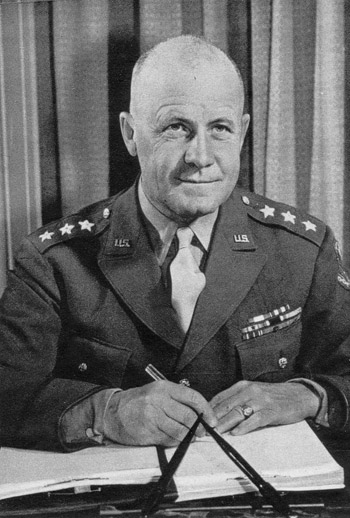
- John Clifford Hodges Lee
- Born: John Clifford Hodges Lee; 1 August 1887; Junction City, Kansas, U.S.
- Died: 30 August 1958 (aged 71); York, Pennsylvania, U.S.
- Burial place: Arlington National Cemetery
- Military career
- Allegiance: United States
- Branch: United States Army
- Service years: 1909–1947
- Rank: Lieutenant general
- Nickname: Jesus Christ Himself
- Service number: 0–2582
- Unit: United States Army Corps of Engineers
- Commands: 2d Infantry Division; Services of Supply (ETO); Communications Zone (ETO); Mediterranean Theater
- Conflicts: World War I; Battle of Saint-Mihiel; Meuse-Argonne Offensive; Allied occupation of the Rhineland; World War II; Operation Torch; Operation Overlord; Battle of the Bulge; Allied Invasion of Germany
- Awards: Army Distinguished Service Medal (2); Navy Distinguished Service Medal; Silver Star; Legion of Merit; Honorary Knight Commander of the Order of the British Empire (Britain); Grand Officer of the Legion of Honor (France); Croix de Guerre with Palm (France); Commander of the Order of Merit Maritime (France); Commander of the Order of Merite Agricole (France); Grand Officer of the Order of the Crown with Palm (Belgium); Croix de Guerre with Palm (Belgium); Grand Cross of the Order of the Oak Crown (Luxembourg); Croix de Guerre (Luxembourg); Grand Officer of the Order of Adolph of Nassau (Luxembourg); Grand Cordon of the Order of Saints Maurice and Lazarus (Italy); Military Order of Italy; Papal Lateran Cross
- Other work: Episcopalian Layman

John Clifford Hodges Lee (1 August 1887 – 30 August 1958) was a career US Army engineer, who rose to the rank of lieutenant general and commanded the Communications Zone (ComZ) in the European Theater of Operations during World War II.

A graduate of the United States Military Academy at West Point, New York, with the class of 1909, Lee assisted with various domestic engineering navigation projects as well as in the Panama Canal Zone, Guam and the Philippines. During World War I, he served on the Western Front on the staff of the 82d and 89th Divisions and earned promotions to major, lieutenant colonel and colonel as well as the Silver Star Medal, the Army Distinguished Service Medal and the Croix de Guerre from the French government.

After World War I, Lee served again in the Philippines, then became District Engineer of the Vicksburg District, responsible for flood control and navigation for a section of the Mississippi River and its tributaries. During the Great Mississippi Flood of 1927, he directed relief work, attempted to shore up the levees, and coordinated the evacuations of towns and districts. He then directed various engineer districts around Washington, D.C., and Philadelphia, Pennsylvania during the Great Depression.

As World War II began, Lee received a promotion to brigadier general and command of the Pacific coast embarkation zones, then of the 2nd Infantry Division. Promoted to command the Services of Supply in the European Theater of Operations after the attack on Pearl Harbor, he helped support Operation Torch, the Allied invasion of Northwest Africa, and Operation Overlord, the Allied invasion of Normandy. The Services of Supply were merged with the European Theater of Operations, United States Army to form ComZ, which supported the advance across France and the Allied Invasion of Germany. Lee received many awards for his service from various Allied countries. A man of strong religious convictions, he urged that African-Americans be integrated into what was then a segregated Army.

== Early life ==
John Clifford Hodges Lee was born in Junction City, Kansas on August 1, 1887, the son of Charles Fenelon Lee and John Clifford née Hodges. (Note: Lee's mother was named for her father, John Noble Hodges, who was killed before her birth while fighting for the Confederacy during the American Civil War.) He had two siblings: an older sister, Katherine, and a younger sister, Josephine. Known as Clifford Lee during his teenage years, he graduated from Junction City High School in 1905, ranked second in his class. His high school success enabled him to compete in 1904 for a 1905 appointment to the United States Military Academy from Representative Charles Frederick Scott without having to take the qualifying exam. He was selected as the first alternate, and planned to attend the Colorado School of Mines, but received the West Point appointment after the first choice resigned.

Lee graduated 12th in the class of 1909. His classmates included Jacob L. Devers, who was ranked 39th, and George S. Patton Jr., who was 46th. The top 15 ranking members of the class accepted commissions in the United States Army Corps of Engineers, into which Lee was commissioned as a second lieutenant on 11 June 1909.

== Early military engineer career ==
Lee was sent to Detroit, Michigan from 12 September to 2 December 1909, then to the Panama Canal Zone until May 1910, after which he was posted to Rock Island, Illinois, where he worked on a project on the upper Mississippi River, then in July 1910 to Pittsburgh, Pennsylvania, to work on the Ohio River locks. In August 1910 he went to Washington Barracks for further training at the Engineer School there. On graduation in October 1911, he reported to Fort Leavenworth, Kansas, where he was in charge of the engineer stables, corrals and shops with the 3d Engineer Battalion.

Promoted to first lieutenant on 27 February 1912, Lee became an instructor for the Ohio National Guard, then returned to the 3d Battalion at Fort Leavenworth. In September and October 1912, he was aide de camp to the Secretary of War, Henry L. Stimson. When the Chief of Staff of the United States Army, Major General Leonard Wood, asked Lee what assignment he would like next, he requested return to his battalion, which was being deployed to Texas City, Texas on the Mexican Border, where there were security concerns as a result of the Mexican Revolution.

In October 1913, Lee and the 3d Engineer Battalion departed for the Western Pacific. He conducted topographical survey work on Guam from 23 October 1913 to 30 July 1914, and then in the Philippines, where he was Senior Topographical Inspector with the Philippine Department from December 1914 to October 1915. He commanded the Northern District on Luzon from December 1914 to June 1915, and the Cagayan District from July to September 1915. He returned to the United States in November 1915, and was assigned to the Wheeling District in Wheeling, West Virginia, where he was responsible for the completion of the No. 14 Dam on the Ohio River. Lee was promoted to captain on 3 June 1916. For his thesis, he submitted the Manual for Topographers he had written in the Philippines.

In Wheeling, Lee met and married Sarah Ann Row. Reverend Robert E. L. Strider Sr., who later became the Bishop of the West Virginia, conducted the ceremony at St. Matthew's Church in Wheeling on 24 September 1917. The couple's only child, John Clifford Hodges Lee Jr., was born on 12 July 1918 and would likewise become a career Army officer, serving in World War II and various domestic assignments, ending his career as Colonel leading the Office of Appalachian Studies, and dying in 1975.

== World War I ==
Lee was appointed Wood's aide de camp on 23 April 1917, shortly after the United States formally declared war on Germany. Wood was offered commands in Hawaii and the Philippines, but turned them down in order to take command of the 89th Division, a newly-formed National Army division, at Camp Funston, Kansas, in which Wood had been appointed to command. Lee, who was promoted to major on 5 August 1917 and lieutenant colonel on 14 February 1918, became the division's acting chief of staff and then assistant chief of staff.

On 18 February 1918, Lee departed for France, where he studied at the Army General Staff College of the American Expeditionary Forces (AEF) at Langres from 13 March to 30 May. Upon graduation he was assigned as the assistant chief of staff, or G-2, (intelligence officer) of the 82d Division. He was awarded the recently created Silver Star for leading a patrol behind enemy lines on 12/13 July.

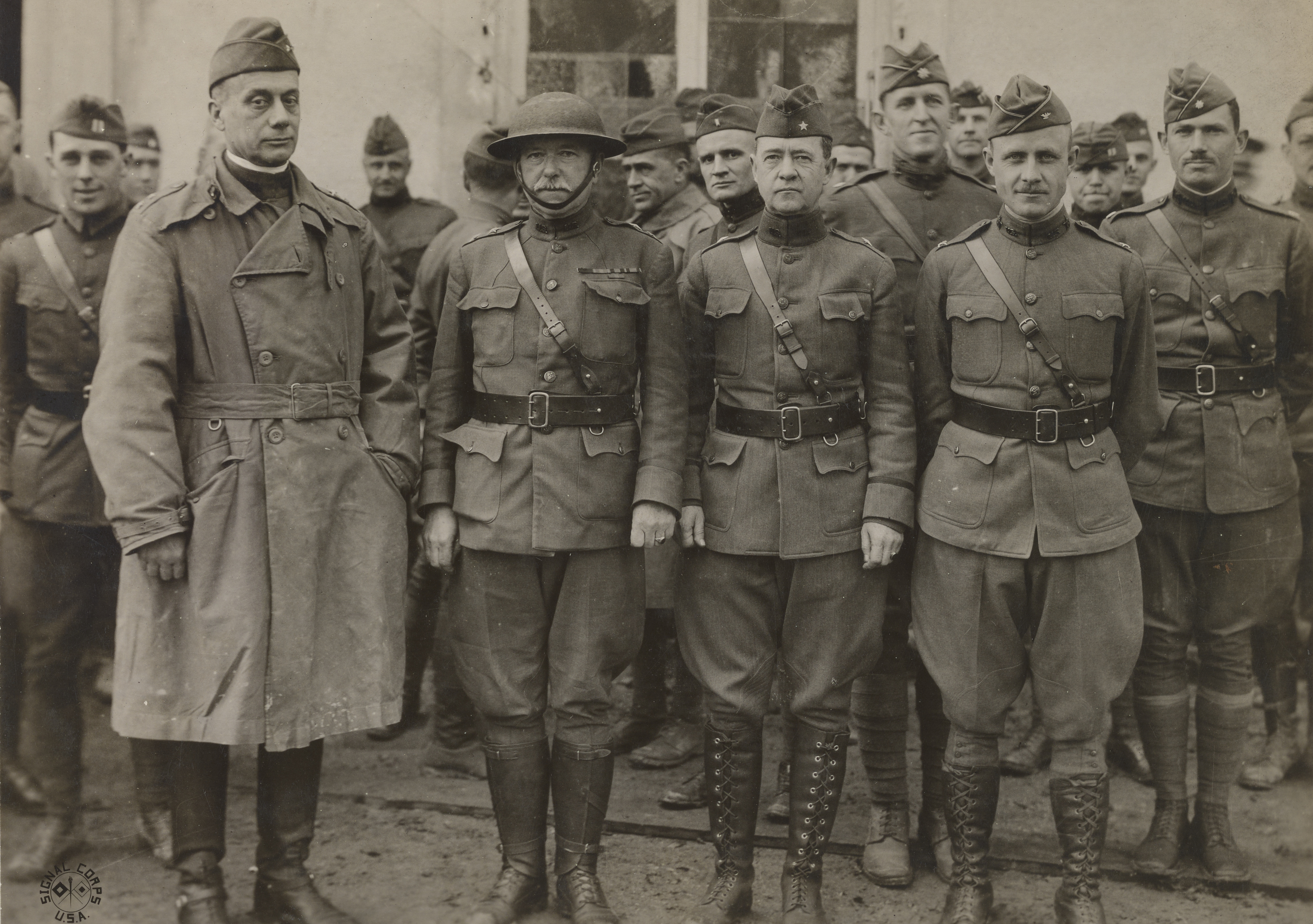
Senior officers of the 89th Division at Stenay, Meuse, France, November 12, 1918. Pictured on the extreme right, in the front row, is Colonel John C. H. Lee.

That month, the 89th Division reached France, albeit without Wood, who had been relieved of command on the eve of its departure for France and temporarily replaced by Brigadier General Frank L. Winn before Major General William M. Wright took over in September. On 18 July Lee returned to it as its Assistant Chief of Staff, G-3 (operations officer). He participated in the Battle of Saint-Mihiel, at the conclusion of which he became the division's chief of staff. He was promoted to colonel on 1 August 1918, and as such participated in the Meuse–Argonne offensive which followed Saint-Mihiel.

For his service, he was awarded the Army Distinguished Service Medal. His citation read:

For exceptionally meritorious and distinguished services. In the preparations for the drive on the St. Mihiel salient in September, and for the Argonne-Meuse offensive in October, 1918, he had charge of the detailed arrangements for and the subsequent execution of the operations of the 89th Division. The successes attained by this division were largely due to his splendid staff co-ordination, marked tactical ability, and sound judgment.

Lee was also awarded the French Croix de Guerre, and was made an Officer of the French Legion of Honor.

== Between the wars ==
After service at Koblenz in the Allied occupation of the Rhineland, the 89th Division returned to Camp Funston in June 1919, where it was demobilized. Lee rejoined Wood as a staff officer at his Central Department Headquarters in Chicago. Lee reverted to his permanent rank of captain on 15 February 1920, but was promoted to major again the following day. He was Assistant Chief of Staff, G-3, of the new Chicago-based VI Corps Area which succeeded the Central Department, from August 1920 to April 1921. Lee was disappointed at the failure of Wood's quest for the Republican nomination in the 1920 presidential election, believing that Wood would have made a better president than the ultimate winner, Warren Harding.

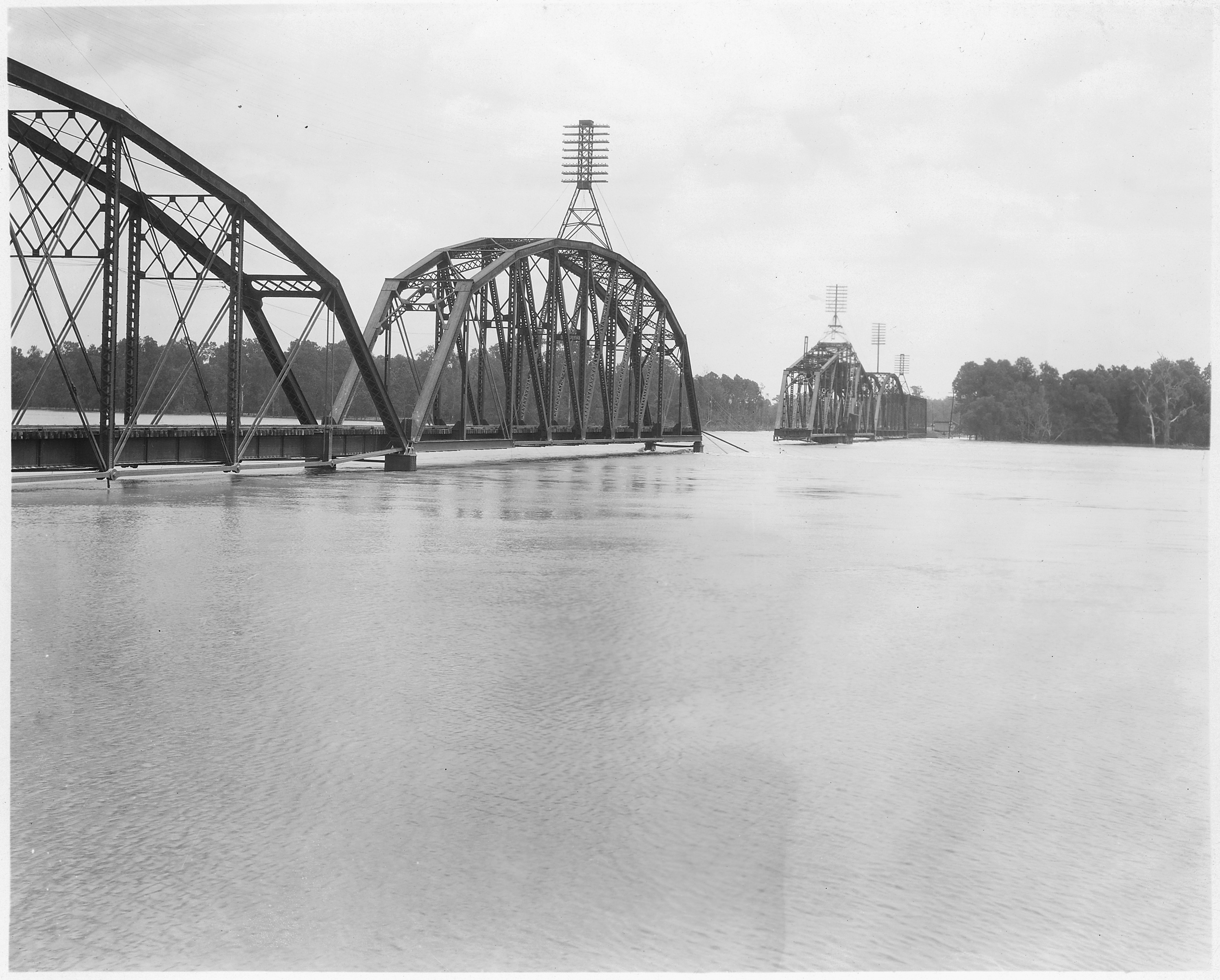
The Great Mississippi Flood of 1927

Lee served a second tour of the Philippines as G-2 of the Philippine Department from September 1923 to July 1926. On returning to the United States, he was posted to Vicksburg, Mississippi, as the District Engineer. This coincided with the Great Mississippi Flood of 1927, the most destructive river flood in the history of the United States. Over 16,000,000 acres (6,500,000 ha) were flooded, 162,000 homes were damaged and 9,000 homes destroyed. Lee directed relief work, attempts to shore up the levees, and evacuations of towns and districts.

The United States Congress responded with the Flood Control Act of 1928, which provided for improved flood control measures. Lee supervised works on the Red River, Ouachita River and Yazoo River. The legislation moved the headquarters of the Mississippi River Commission from St Louis to Vicksburg, where it was located at the center of the flood area but well above the level of the river. Lee directed the construction of the new headquarters facility, and of the Waterways Experiment Station there.

Lee attended the Army War College from September 1931 to June 1932, and then was Assistant Commandant of the Army Industrial College until January 1934. He was promoted to lieutenant colonel again on 1 December 1933. He was seconded to the Civil Works Administration until May 1934, when he became District Engineer of the Washington District, in charge of Potomac River watershed, northwestern Chesapeake Bay and the Washington, D.C., water supply. He was then District Engineer of the Philadelphia District until April 1938, when he was made Division Engineer of the North Pacific Division, based in Portland, Oregon. He was promoted to colonel again on 1 June 1938.

In 1938 Lee became an hereditary member of the Massachusetts Society of the Cincinnati.

== World War II ==
=== Zone of the Interior ===
Promoted to brigadier general in the Army of the United States on 1 October 1940, Lee was commanding general of Pacific Ports of Embarkation, working out of Fort Mason, California. He was responsible for updating all Pacific ports for wartime, engineering the changes needed to transfer materiel and troops more efficiently from rail to ship. However, he was warned by the Chief of Staff of the United States Army, General George C. Marshall, that his tenure might be brief, and might soon be given another assignment, so he should select a deputy and train him to take over. Lee chose Colonel Frederick Gilbreath.

A sign that Lee was being considered for a command assignment was his being sent to Fort Benning, Georgia, for a refresher course on infantry tactics. Lee was designated as an observer at the Louisiana Maneuvers in 1940 and 1941. During those maneuvers, the 2d Infantry Division had been disappointing, and Lee was ordered to assume command of it at Fort Sam Houston, Texas, and bring it up to standard. He replaced the commander of the 38th Infantry Regiment with Colonel William G. Weaver. Lee was concerned about the performance of the divisional artillery, and arranged for it to receive additional training at Fort Sill, Oklahoma, which was where he was when he heard the news of the Japanese attack on Pearl Harbor, which brought the United States into World War II. Lieutenant General Lesley J. McNair was impressed with Lee's performance, and Lee was promoted to major general on 14 February 1942.

=== Bolero ===
In May 1942, the War Department considered the creation of a Services of Supply (SOS) organization in the European Theater of Operations (ETO) to handle the large volume of service troops and supplies being deployed to the United Kingdom for Operation Bolero, the buildup of US troops there for Operation Sledgehammer, the proposed Allied invasion of France in 1942, and Operation Roundup, the larger follow up operation in 1943. Lee's name was put forward for the position of its commander by the Secretary of War, Stimson; the commander of United States Army Services of Supply (USASOS), Lieutenant General Brehon B. Somervell; and McNair, the commander of Army Ground Forces. Marshall had already formed a positive impression of Lee when he had commanded the Pacific Ports of Embarkation, and decided to appoint him.

Lee arrived in Washington, D.C., on 5 May 1942, where he attended two weeks' of conferences about Bolero and the form of organization for the ETO SOS that Marshall and Somervell had in mind. They were determined that the organization of the SOS in the theaters of war should be identical to that of the USASOS in the United States. During World War I, this had not been the case, and the resultant overlapping and criss-crossing lines of communication had caused great confusion and inefficiency, both in Washington, D.C. and in Tours. Somervell instructed each chief in the USASOS to recommend the best two men in his branch, one of whom would accompany Lee, while the other remained in Washington, D.C. For his chief of staff, Lee chose Colonel Thomas B. Larkin, who was promoted to brigadier general.

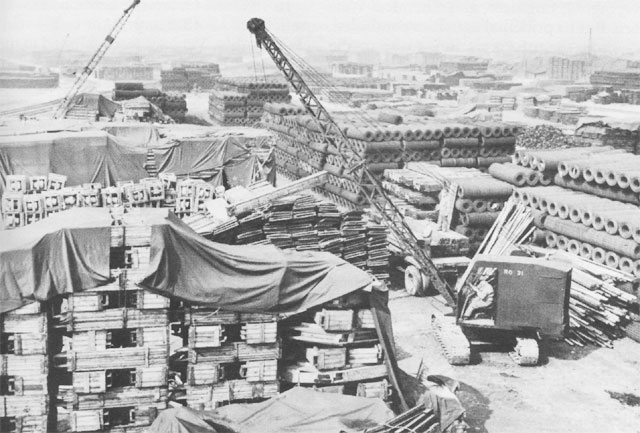
The General Depot at Ashchurch stocked with supplies for Operation Overlord

Lee met with Major General Homer M. Groninger, the commander of the New York Port of Embarkation (POE), through which all troops and supplies for the ETO would be funnelled, and Lee and Larkin consulted with Lieutenant General James G. Harbord, who had commanded the SOS of the American Expeditionary Force during World War I. Harbord noted that he too had commanded the 2d Division before being given the SOS assignment. He recommended that Lee obtain a personal train. Harbord had been given one by the French in World War I and had found it invaluable.

Lee flew to the UK on 23 May 1942 with the nine staff who would form the nucleus of his new command. He found that the commander of the United States Forces in the British Isles (USAFBI), Major General James E. Chaney, had prepared a different plan for the organization of the ETO headquarters, one along the orthodox lines laid out in the Field Service Regulations, with Brigadier General Donald A. Davison designated to command the SOS. But Marshall had selected Lee, and he had mandated that the new theater organization should be "along the general pattern of a command post with a minimum of supply and administrative services." Somervell and Major General Dwight D. Eisenhower, the head of the Operations Division of the War Department General Staff, arrived in London on 26 May for discussions with Chaney about the organization of the ETO and the SOS. USAFBI officially became European Theater of Operations, United States Army (ETOUSA) on 8 June, and Chaney was replaced by Eisenhower on 24 June.

Somervell and Lee conducted a whirlwind inspection tour of US depots and bases in England on a special train belonging to General Sir Bernard Paget, the British Commander-in-Chief, Home Forces. This reminded Lee of Harbord's advice about the special train. They took up the matter with Lord Leathers, the British Minister of War Transport, who agreed to provide a small train. It had a car for Lee, two cars for his staff, a conference car, two flatcars for vehicles, and a dining car.

The train was intended as a timesaver, and that it undoubtedly was. General Lee refused to bow to the criticism [that it was an extravagance], convinced in his own mind that the train was fully justified. As attested by members of his staff, it was a work train, and an instrument of torture. General Lee set a grueling pace on his inspection trips, and it was rare indeed when a meal was served on the train during daylight hours, for most runs were made at night. The day’s work, consisting of inspections and conferences, normally began at five in the morning and lasted until evening. Most of the staff members who accompanied the SOS commander considered the trips agonizing ordeals and would have avoided them if possible.

One of Lee's first concerns was to find a suitable location for his SOS headquarters. He found limited space at its initial location at No. 1 Great Cumberland Place in London, and decided to locate the headquarters in southern England where most base installations would be located. Brigadier General Claude N. Thiele, Lee's chief of administrative services, suggested Cheltenham, in Gloucestershire, about 90 miles (140 km) west of London. The British War Office administrative staff occupied 500,000 square feet (46,000 m^{2}) of offices there, but were willing to return to their old London location. A regional organization was adopted on 20 July, with the UK divided into four base sections.

=== Torch ===
One day General Lee and some of his officers came over for inspection of his new Security Company B. Naturally, he looked in the garbage can where Mess Sergeant Landry had emptied a box of raisins. The General asked, "What are these raisins doing in the garbage can?" Mess Sergeant Landry said right away, "They're rancid, General", never expecting what happened next. The general reached down into the garbage can, picked up some raisins, put them in his mouth and started chewing. He said, "They don't taste rancid." Sergeant Landry said, "I'll get them out of there right away, wash them, and have them served." And out they came.

— Cox (2018), The General Who Wore Six Stars, p. 86

By the end of June 1942, there were 54,845 US troops in the UK, but a series of defeats in North Africa and on the Russian front, along with heavy losses from submarine attacks, convinced the British Chiefs of Staff that Sledgehammer would not be feasible. Instead, Operation Torch, an invasion of Northwest Africa, was substituted. This changed only the purpose of Bolero; over 570,000 long tons (580,000 t) of stores and supplies still arrived in August, September, and October.

Although less than Somervell hoped, it was more than Lee's service units could cope with. Stores and supplies had to be cleared from the port areas as quickly as possible lest they become targets for German bombing raids. There was no time to build new depots, so they were shipped to British depots and warehouses. The Americans and British were unfamiliar with each other's procedures.

Priority had been given to shipping combat units, and service units made up only 21 percent of the theater's strength, which was insufficient. Nor were more units available in the United States; the mobilization program had also produced too few service units, and Somervell was forced to ship partly trained units in the hope that they could learn on the job. Perhaps 30 percent of the stores arrived with no markings indicating what they were, and 25 percent were merely marked by general type, such as medical or ordnance stores. Lee did not have enough personnel to sort, identify and catalog their contents. Soon vast quantities of stores and supplies could not be located.

In August it was discovered that most of the organizational equipment of the 1st Infantry Division, which was earmarked for Operation Torch, was still in the United States, and none of the hospitals earmarked for Torch arrived with their full equipment before October. Lee was initially optimistic that he could turn the situation around, but by September, there was no option but to request that USASOS re-ship stores that had already been despatched but could not be located if Torch was to be mounted on time. Eisenhower, who had been designated to command Torch, leaned on Lee, and withdrew his recommendation that Lee succeed him as commander of ETOUSA. Strenuous efforts were made, and by October Lee was able to report that the needs of Torch would be met.

The needs of Torch placed a heavy drain on the resources of Lee's command. There were 228,000 US troops in the UK in October, but 151,000 went to North Africa by the end of February 1943. The SOS also lost key officers, including Larkin. Some 400,000 long tons (410,000 t) of supplies were shipped from the UK to North Africa between October 1942 and April 1943, while receipts totalled less than 35,000 long tons (36,000 t) per month. Lee forcefully argued that preparations for Roundup should resume. He visited North Africa in January 1943 after taking a course as an air gunner so he would not be a useless passenger of the aircraft, and spoke to Patton and General Sir Bernard Montgomery about their supply situation.

=== Overlord ===
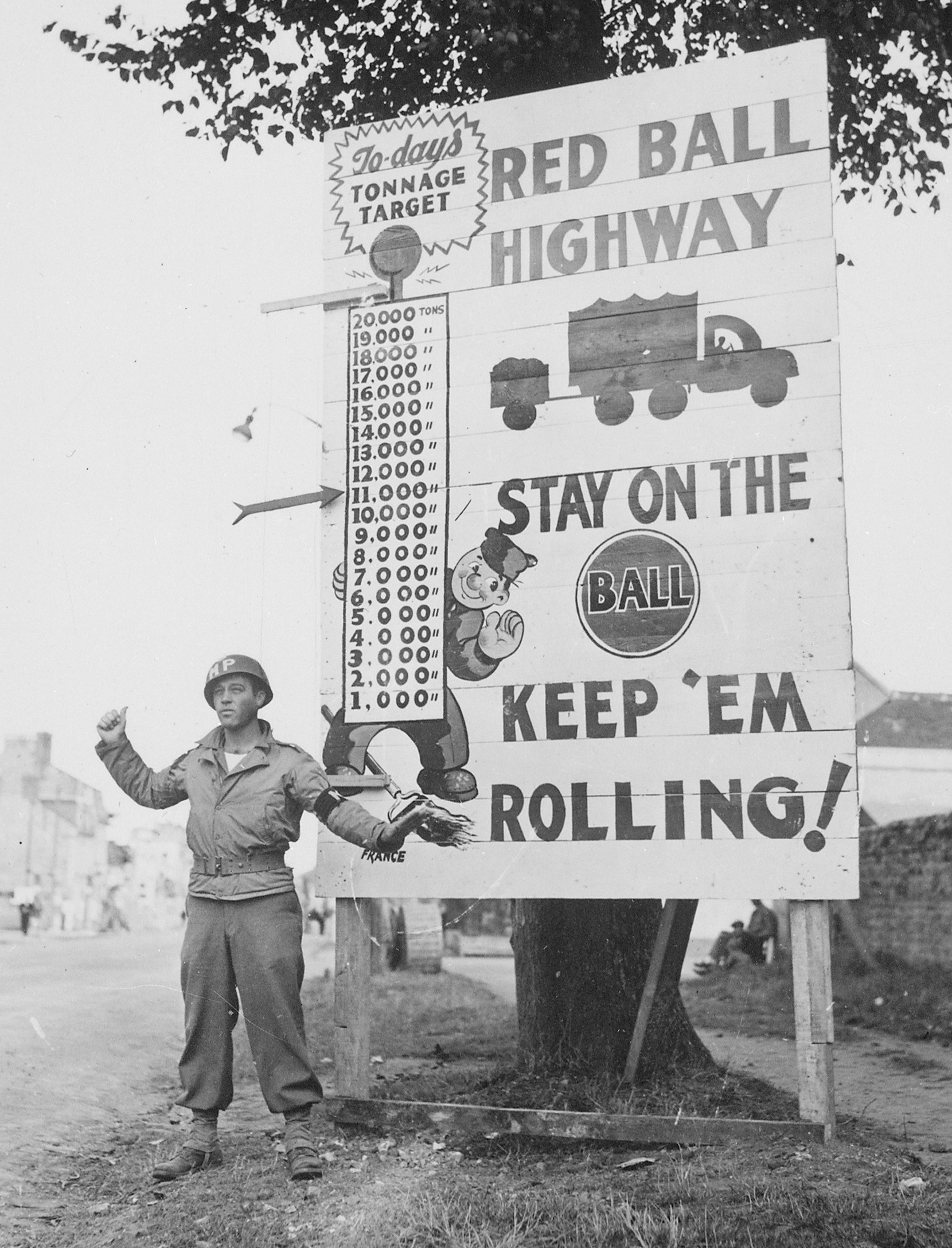
The Communications Zone improvised the Red Ball Express, which used trucks to deliver supplies to the forward area until the railroad system could be rehabilitated.

Eisenhower was succeeded as commander of ETOUSA by Lieutenant General Frank M. Andrews on 4 February 1943. On Somervell's advice, Lee submitted a proposal to Andrews that he be named deputy theater commander for supply and administration, and that the theater G-4 branch be placed under him. This would have given Lee a status similar to that enjoyed by Somervell. Andrews rejected the proposal, but he did make some changes, moving part of SOS Headquarters to London while its operations staff remained in Cheltenham. Weaver was appointed Lee's deputy for operations. Andrews regarded Lee as "oppressively religious", and resolved to ask Marshall for his recall. Before he could do so, Andrews was killed in a plane crash in Iceland on 3 May, and was succeeded by Lieutenant General Jacob L. Devers, who agreed to abolish the theater G-4 and transfer its functions to Lee.

For the cross-channel attack, now postponed to 1944 and codenamed Operation Overlord, the service chiefs wanted 490,000 SOS troops. Devers trimmed this to 375,000, which would be 25 percent of the theater troop strength, a figure that was accepted by the War Department. The most acute shortages in 1943 were of engineer units to build new airbases, hospitals, supply depots and training facilities. As in 1942, Lee was forced to accept partly trained units. In the first four months of 1944, the number of SOS troops in the UK increased from 79,900 to 220,200. Some lessons had been learned from 1942. The New York POE started turning back incorrectly labelled cargo. In the first day this system went into operation, some 14,700 items were returned to the depots.

On 16 January 1944, Eisenhower returned to take control of the Allied forces for Overlord. His headquarters was designated Supreme Headquarters, Allied Expeditionary Force (SHAEF). With SHAEF taking over the operational functions, ETOUSA was combined with SOS to create what would become the Communications Zone (Com Z) once operations commenced. A complicating factor was the creation of the First United States Army Group under Lieutenant General Omar N. Bradley, who sought to place logistical functions under his command.

Lee also conflicted with Eisenhower's chief of staff, Lieutenant General Walter B. Smith. While Eisenhower respected Lee's administrative talents, Smith resented Lee's position as deputy theater commander, which allowed Lee to bypass Eisenhower, and occasionally frustrate Smith's efforts to rein in the operational commanders like Bradley and Patton through logistics. Smith arranged for his own protégé, Major General Royal B. Lord, to be appointed as Lee's deputy.

On 21 February 1944, Lee was promoted to lieutenant general, along with Courtney H. Hodges, Richard K. Sutherland and Raymond A. Wheeler. Lee began a curious habit of wearing his stars on both the back and front of his helmet, which added to his reputation as an eccentric. (A book about him was titled The General Who Wore Six Stars because of this habit; it was not that Lee earned an actual rank of 6-star general.) Lee was often called "Jesus Christ Himself" based on his initials. He was also known as "Court House" and "Church House" Lee.

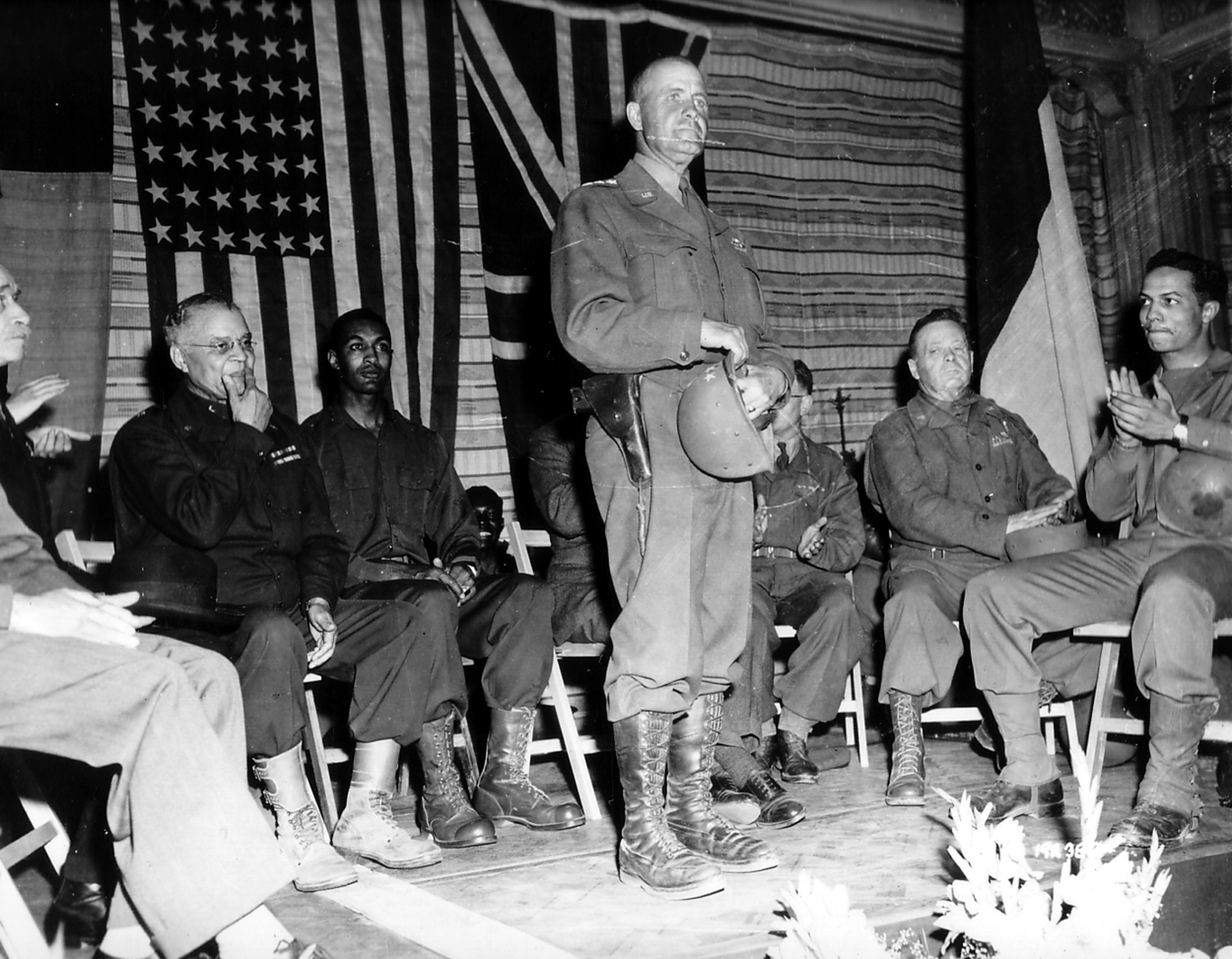
Lee gives a speech. Brigadier General Benjamin O. Davis Sr., the army's first African-American general sits behind him.

The logistical arrangements for D-Day proceeded well, although the initial advance was much slower than anticipated, and casualties and ammunition expenditure were high. In the lead up to Operation Cobra, the breakout from Normandy, Com Z's Advance Section took over responsibility for the depots and installations in Normandy, except for the fuel dumps.

During the subsequent pursuit across France and Belgium the advance was much faster than forecast. There was no time to establish intermediate supply dumps. Lee improvised with the road transport, the Red Ball Express, but logistic support of the armies depended on the repair of the railroad system, and the development of ports. The original plans to use ports in Brittany were abandoned in favor of Marseille in the south, and Le Havre and Antwerp, which were captured by the British 21st Army Group. In August, Com Z Headquarters moved from the UK to a camp at Valognes in France.

Although Eisenhower had expressed a desire that headquarters not be located in Paris, on 1 September Lee decided to move Com Z headquarters there. This involved the movement of 8,000 officers and 21,000 enlisted men from the UK and Valognes, and took two weeks to accomplish at a time when there were severe supply shortages. Eventually, Com Z occupied 167 hotels in Paris, the Seine Base Section headquarters occupied 129 more, and SHAEF occupied another 25. Lee established his own official residence in the Hotel George V. The front of the building was kept clear for his own vehicle. He justified the move to Paris on the grounds that Paris was the hub of France's road, rail and inland waterway communications networks. The logic was conceded, but the use of scarce fuel and transport resources at a critical time caused embarrassment.

During the German Ardennes Offensive, Lee deployed service troops, particularly engineers to help delay the German advance while other Com Z troops shifted supply dumps in the path of the German advance to safer locations in the rear, thereby denying the Germans access to captured American fuel supplies. Some 2,800,000 US gal (11,000,000 L) of fuel were moved.

=== Lee's challenge to army racial policy ===
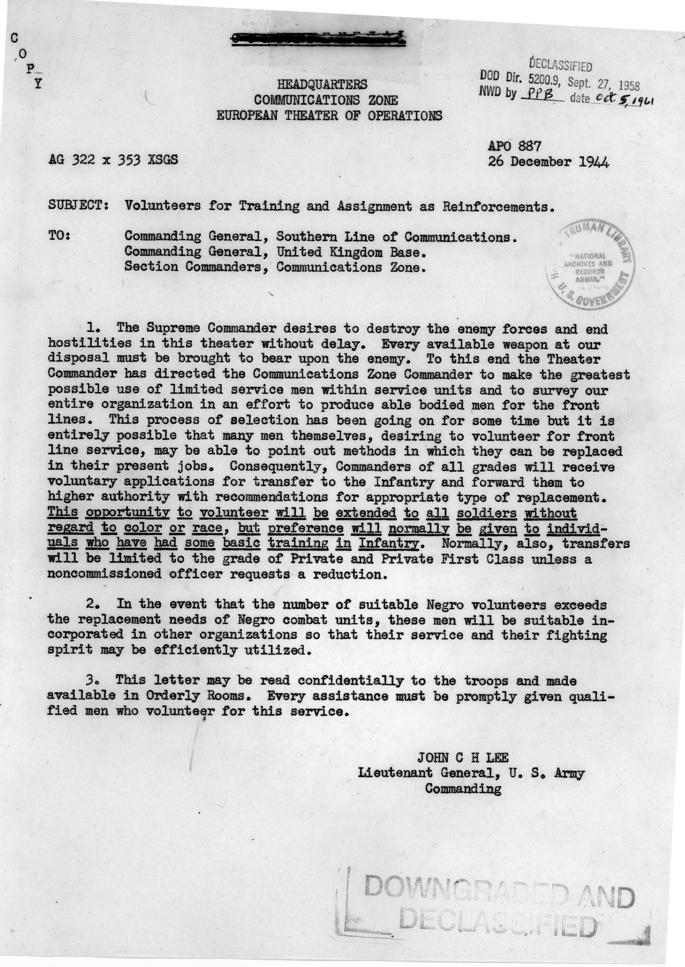
Memo from Lieutenant General J. C. H. Lee calling for volunteers for infantry training "without regard to color or race".

During October, Bradley incurred very heavy casualties in fighting in the Battle of Aachen and the Battle of Hürtgen Forest in October and November. This resulted in a critical shortage of infantry replacements even before the crisis situation created by the Ardennes Offensive. Noting that casualties among newly arrived reinforcements greatly exceeded those among veterans, Lee tried to humanize the replacement depots, and suggested changing the name so that they sounded less like spare parts. Bradley opposed this, arguing for more substantial changes.

One source of infantry reinforcements was Com Z. Lee suggested that physically fit African-American soldiers in the Communications Zone, providing their jobs could be filled by limited-duty personnel, should be allowed to volunteer for infantry duty, and be placed in otherwise white units, without regard to a quota but on an as-needed basis. He wrote: "It is planned to assign you without regard to color or race".

Walter Bedell Smith disagreed with Lee's plan, writing to Eisenhower:

Two years ago I would have considered the marked statement the most dangerous thing that I had ever seen in regard to Negro relations. I have talked with Lee about it, and he can't see this at all. He believes that it is right that colored and white soldiers should be mixed in the same company. With this belief I do not argue, but the War Department policy is different.

Reflecting the prevalent racial prejudices of most US Army officers at the time, Smith did not believe Black troops capable of combat duty. His opinion was that a one-for-one replacement should not be attempted; only replacements as full platoons of Black soldiers. As a result of the directive 2,500 volunteers were organized into 53 rifle platoons, and sent to the front, to be distributed as needed to companies. In the 12th Army Group they were attached to regiments, while in the 6th Army Group the platoons were grouped into companies attached to the division. The former arrangement were generally better rated by the units they were attached to, because the Negro platoons had no company-level unit training.

Lee featured in the 1943 US Army training film A Welcome to Britain, where he was involved in a sequence involving a British woman inviting a colored GI to tea. The narrator focused on Lee's family's background with the Confederacy and Lee took the opportunity to encourage American soldiers to treat black and white soldiers the same.

== Post-war career ==
After VE Day, the Communications Zone became Theater Service Forces, and Lee moved his headquarters to Frankfurt in June 1945. In December 1945, he succeeded Lieutenant General Matthew B. Ridgway as Deputy Theater Commander and Commander, Mediterranean Theater of Operations, United States Army (MTOUSA) in Italy. He worked closely with the theater commander, British lieutenant general Sir William Duthie Morgan until January 1946, when Morgan was appointed the Army member of the British Joint Staff Mission in Washington, D.C.

Lee then became theater commander as well as MTOUSA commander. He was responsible for the maintenance and repatriation of hundreds of thousands of American service men and women, opened the Sicily–Rome American Cemetery and Memorial, and restored infrastructure of many of the nations surrounding the Mediterranean. The Allied Occupation of Italy ended when the Peace Treaty with Italy went into effect in September 1947, and Lee returned to the United States.

In August 1947 newspaper columnist Robert C. Ruark said General Lee misused enlisted men under his command in occupied Italy. Ruark vowed "I am going to blow a loud whistle on Lieutenant General John C. H. Lee", and published a series of articles critical of Lee's command, quoting several disgruntled soldiers. Some suggested Ruark was unhappy because a journalist's train had left him behind and Lee would not provide secondary transportation for him. Subsequently, Lee requested that his command be thoroughly investigated by the Office of the Inspector General. Lee and his command were exonerated in a report by Major General Ira T. Wyche, which was issued in October 1947.

== Retirement and honors ==
After 38 years of active service, Lee retired from the army on 31 December 1947 at the Presidio of San Francisco. He received many honors and awards for his services, including the Army Distinguished Service Medal, the Navy Distinguished Service Medal, the Silver Star, and the Legion of Merit. Foreign awards included being made an honorary Knight Commander of the Order of the British Empire by the UK, and a Grand Officer of the Legion of Honor, Commander of the Order of Merit Maritime and a Commander of the Order of Merite Agricole by France, which also awarded him the Croix de Guerre for his WWI service.

Belgium made Lee a Grand Officer of the Order of the Crown and awarded him its Croix de Guerre. He received the Grand Cross of the Order of the Oak Crown and the Croix de Guerre from Luxembourg, which also made him a Grand Officer of the Order of Adolph of Nassau. Italy made him a Grand Cordon of the Order of Saints Maurice and Lazarus and a member of the Military Order of Italy, and he received the Papal Lateran Cross from the Vatican.

In addition, Lee was made an honorary member of the French Foreign Legion, the II Polish Corps, the Italian Bersaglieri and several Alpini Regiments. He was declared an honorary Citizen of Cherbourg in France, and Antwerp and Liège in Belgium, was given the school tie of Cheltenham College in England, and awarded an honorary doctor of law degree from the University of Bristol.

Lee was an Episcopalian and kept a Bible with him at all times. He declined post-war invitations to serve as a corporate board executive, preferring to devote his life to service. In retirement he spent his last eleven years leading the Brotherhood of St. Andrew, a lay organization of the Episcopal Church, as executive vice president from 1948 to 1950, and then as its president.

== Death and legacy ==
Lee's first wife Sarah died in a motor vehicle accident in 1939, and he remarried on 19 September 1945 to Eve Brookie Ellis, whom he also survived. He died in York, Pennsylvania, on 30 August 1958, aged 71, and was buried at Arlington National Cemetery beside his first wife.

There is a large portrait of General Lee in the West Point Club at the United States Military Academy.

== Reputation ==
In his wartime memoir, Crusade in Europe, Eisenhower described Lee as:

... an engineer officer of long experience with a reputation for getting things done. Because of his mannerisms and his stern insistence upon the outward forms of discipline, which he himself meticulously observed, he was considered a martinet by most of his acquaintances. He was determined, correct, and devoted to duty; he had long been known as an effective administrator and as a man of the highest character and religious fervor. I sometimes felt that he was a modern Cromwell, but I was willing to waive the rigidity of his mannerisms in favor of his constructive qualities. Indeed, I felt it was possible that his unyielding methods might be vital to success in an activity where an iron hand is always mandatory.

Official historian Roland G. Ruppenthal wrote:

General Lee continued to be a controversial personality throughout the history of the theater, owing in part to the anomalous position which he held. But the controversy over the SOS was heightened by his personal traits. Heavy on ceremony, somewhat forbidding in manner and appearance, and occasionally tactless in exercising authority which he regarded to be within the province of the SOS, General Lee often aroused suspicions and created opposition where support might have been forthcoming. It appears, however, that few of his subordinates, and certainly fewer still of the persons with whom he dealt in the field commands, got to know him well. Those who did knew him to be kindly, unselfish, modest, extremely religious, and a man of simple tastes, however much this seemed to be contradicted by the picture of ostentation presented by the living arrangements of his staff and by his use of a special train for his comings and goings in the United Kingdom. General Lee has been aptly referred to as a "soldier of the old school," one who believed firmly in the dignity of his profession and wore the Army uniform with pride. He expected every other soldier, from general to private, to revere that uniform as he did. Many, without attempting to understand his rigid sense of discipline, were quick to label him pompous and a martinet. There can be no doubt that General Lee was motivated by a high sense of duty, and he expected others to measure up to his own concept of soldierly qualities.

Stephen Ambrose wrote in Citizen Soldiers:

The biggest jerk in ETO was Lt. Gen. John C. H. Lee (USMA 1909), commander of Services of Supply (SOS). He had a most difficult job, to be sure. And of course it is in the nature of an army that everyone resents the quartermaster, and Lee was the head quartermaster for the whole of ETO.

Lee was a martinet who had an exalted opinion of himself. He also had a strong religious fervour (Eisenhower compared him to Cromwell) that struck a wrong note with everyone. He handed out the equipment as if it were a personal gift. He hated waste; once he was walking through a mess hall, reached into the garbage barrel, pulled out a half-eaten loaf of bread, started chomping on it, and gave the cooks hell for throwing away perfectly good food. He had what Bradley politely called "an unfortunate pomposity" and was cordially hated. Officers and men gave him a nickname based on his initials J. C. H.—Jesus Christ himself.

Lee's best known excess came in September [1944], at the height of the supply crisis. Eisenhower had frequently expressed his view that no major headquarters should be located near the temptations of a large city, and had specifically reserved the hotels in Paris for the use of combat troops on leave. Lee nevertheless, and without Eisenhower's knowledge, moved his headquarters to Paris. His people requisitioned all the hotels previously occupied by the Germans, and took over schools and other large buildings. More than 8,000 officers and 21,000 men in SOS descended on the city in less than a week, with tens of thousands more to follow. Parisians began to mutter that the U.S. Army demands were in excess of those made by the Germans.

The GIs and their generals were furious. They stated the obvious: at the height of the supply crisis, Lee had spent his precious time organizing the move, then used up precious gasoline, all so that he and his entourage could enjoy the hotels of Paris. It got worse, With 29,000 SOS troops in Pans, the great majority of them involved in some way in the flow of supplies from the beaches and ports to the front, and taking into account what Paris had to sell from wine and girls to jewels and perfumes, a black market on a grand scale sprang up.

Eisenhower was enraged. He sent a firm order to Lee to stop the entry into Paris of every individual not absolutely essential and to move out of the city every man who was not. He said essential duties "will not include provision of additional facilities, services and recreation for SOS or its headquarters." He told Lee that he would like to order him out of the city altogether, but could not afford to waste more gasoline in moving SOS again. He said Lee had made an "extremely unwise" decision and told him to correct the situation as soon as possible, Of course, Lee and his headquarters stayed in Paris.

== Decorations ==

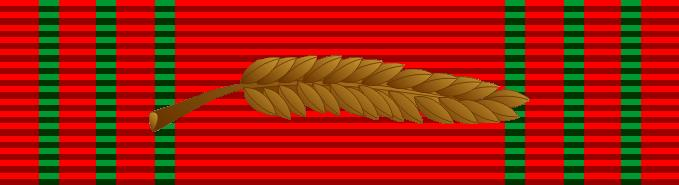

1st Row	Army Distinguished Service Medal with Oak Leaf Cluster		Navy Distinguished Service Medal	
2nd Row	Silver Star	Legion of Merit	World War I Victory Medal	Army of Occupation of Germany Medal
3rd Row	American Defense Service Medal	European-African-Middle Eastern Campaign Medal	World War II Victory Medal	Army of Occupation Medal
4th Row	National Defense Service Medal	Officer of the Legion of Honor (France)	War Cross 1914–1918 with Bronze Palm (France)	Honorary Knight Commander of the Order of the British Empire (Military Division, United Kingdom)
5th Row	Grand Officer of the Legion of Honor (France)	French Croix de guerre 1939–1945 with Palm	Commander of the Order of Agricultural Merit (France)	Commander of the Order of Maritime Merit (France)
6th Row	Grand Officer of the Order of the Crown, with Palm (Belgium)	Belgian Croix de guerre 1940–1945 with Palm	Grand Cross of the Order of the Oak Crown (Luxembourg)	Grand Officer of the Order of Adolphe of Nassau (Luxembourg)
7th Row	Luxembourg War Cross	Grand Cross of the Order of Saints Maurice and Lazarus (Italy)	Military Order of Italy	Papal Lateran Cross (Holy See)

== Dates of rank ==
Insignia	Rank	Component	Date	Reference
No insignia in 1909	Second lieutenant	Corps of Engineers	11 June 1909	
	First lieutenant	Corps of Engineers	27 February 1912	
	Captain	Corps of Engineers	3 June 1916	
	Major	Temporary	5 August 1917	
	Lieutenant colonel	Temporary	14 February 1918	
	Colonel	Temporary	1 August 1918	
	Captain	Reverted to substantive rank	15 February 1920	
	Major	Corps of Engineers	16 February 1920	
	Lieutenant colonel	Corps of Engineers	1 December 1933	
	Colonel	Corps of Engineers	1 June 1938	
	Brigadier general	Army of the United States	1 October 1940	
	Major general	Army of the United States	14 February 1942	
	Brigadier general	Regular Army	2 October 1943	
	Lieutenant general	Army of the United States	21 February 1944	
	Major general	Regular Army	27 February 1947	
	Lieutenant general	Retired List	31 December 1947	

== Notes ==
Military offices
Preceded by John N. Greely	Commanding General 2nd Infantry Division; 1941–1942	Succeeded by Walter M. Robertson
