= My Gal Sal (disambiguation) =

My Gal Sal is a 1942 American musical film.

My Gal Sal may also refer to:

- My Gal Sal (aircraft), the nickname of a restored World War II B-17E-BO Flying Fortress
- "My Gal Sal", a 1905 song composed by Paul Dresser, the subject of the 1942 film
