= Kee Bird =

Boeing B-29 Superfortress

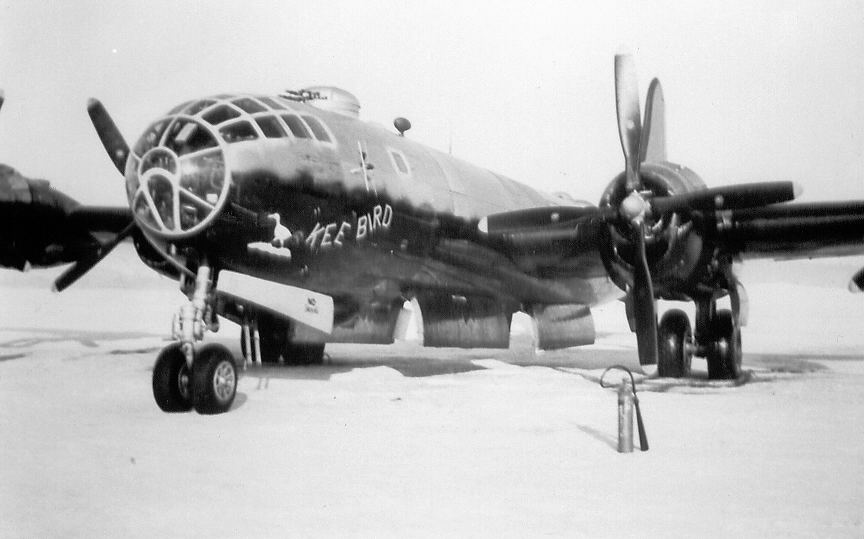
- Photo of the B-29 prior to its last mission, Ladd Army Airfield, Alaska Territory, 19 February 1947

General information
- Type: Boeing B-29-BW-95 Superfortress
- Manufacturer: Boeing Aircraft Company; Wichita, Kansas
- Owners: United States Army Air Forces
- Construction number: 13662
- Serial: 45-21768

History
- Manufactured: 1945
- In service: 1945–1947
- Fate: Crashed in Greenland 1947. Destroyed during recovery effort, 1995. Remains on ice shelf on a lake at 80°15′45.40″N 060°32′53.57″W

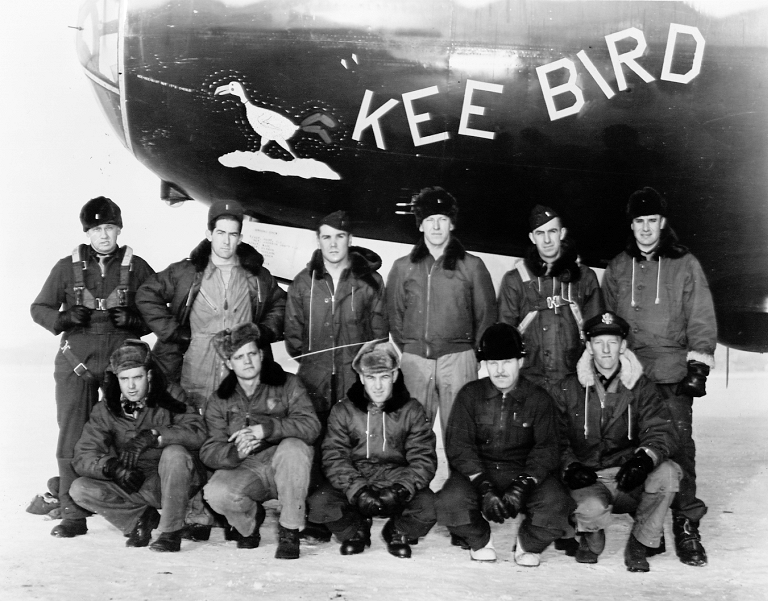
Aircrew photo, February 1947. (L to R, Standing) Lt Vern H. Arnett; Lt Russell S. Jordan; Lt John G. Lesman; Lt Burl Cowan; Lt Robert L. Luedke; Lt Talbot M. Gates; (L to R, Front Row) MSgt Lawrence Yarborough; SSgt Ernest C. Stewart; TSgt Robert Leader; SSGT Paul R. McNamara; Lt Howard R Adams

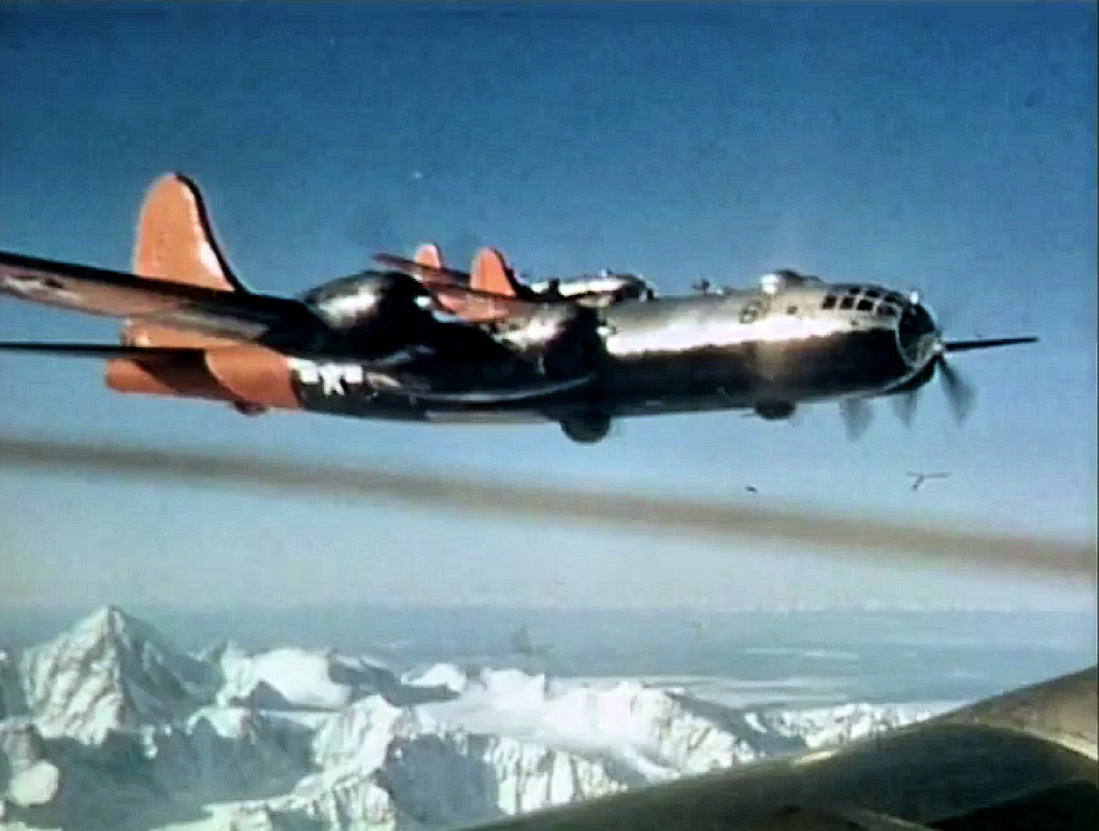
Kee Bird flying in formation

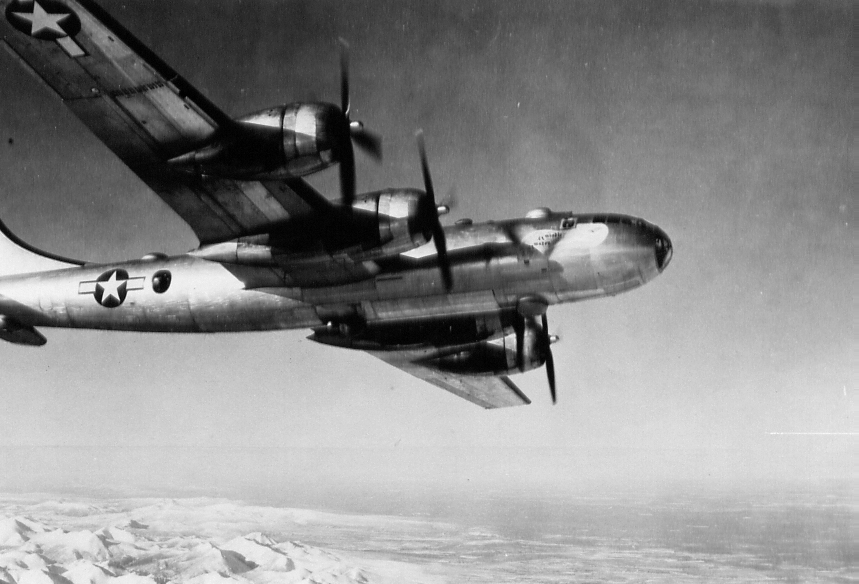
Kee Bird in flight

The Kee Bird was a United States Army Air Forces Boeing B-29 Superfortress, serial 45-21768, of the 46th Reconnaissance Squadron, that became marooned after making an emergency landing in northwest Greenland during a secret Cold War spying mission on 21 February 1947. While the entire crew was safely evacuated after spending three days in the isolated Arctic tundra, the aircraft itself was left at the landing site. It lay there undisturbed until 1994, when a privately funded mission was launched to repair and return it. During the attempted recovery, on 21 May 1995, a fire broke out, resulting in the destruction and loss of the airframe on the ground.

== Mission background ==
In the early years of the Cold War, some of the most important strategic reconnaissance was carried out by Strategic Air Command units deployed to Ladd Army Airfield, near Fairbanks, Alaska Territory. One of the SAC's initial missions was to plan strategic aerial reconnaissance on a global scale. The first efforts were in photo-reconnaissance and mapping. Along with the photo-reconnaissance mission, a small electronic intelligence (ELINT) cadre was operating. Weather reconnaissance was part of the effort, as was long-range detection, the search for Soviet atomic explosions.

In the late 1940s, strategic intelligence on Soviet capabilities and intentions was scarce. Before the development of the Lockheed U-2 high-altitude spy plane and orbital reconnaissance satellites, technology and politics limited American reconnaissance efforts to the borders, and not the heartland, of the Soviet Union. Ladd Field was one of the important staging areas for gathering what strategic intelligence could be obtained along Soviet borders.

Assigned to the 46th Reconnaissance Squadron, the Kee Bird was originally a standard Block 95 B-29 Superfortress bomber manufactured at Boeing's Wichita, Kansas, plant in 1945, c/n 13662, one of the last B-29s manufactured at the plant. It was delivered to the United States Army Air Forces as serial 45-21768, on August 9, 1945. Once delivered, though, it was placed in storage at Davis-Monthan Army Airfield in Tucson, Arizona, until mid-1946, when the 46th RS was formed. Nineteen B-29s were assigned to the 46th RS, and at that time, 768 was one of six squadron aircraft that was fitted with special camera installations for photo-reconnaissance work. It carried three K-17B, two K-22, and one K-18 cameras with provisions for others. With the reconnaissance equipment, it was redesignated an F-13 (in the F- for photo reconnaissance series). The standard B-29 bombing equipment and defensive armament were retained.

With growing tensions in US-Soviet relations, SAC explored the possibility of attacking Soviet targets via great circle routes over the North Pole as part of "Project Nanook". The 46th was engaged in mapping the northern section of Greenland and also to search for any Soviet military activity in this uninhabited area. The squadron was assigned to Ladd Field, near Fairbanks, Alaska, in June 1946, and began operational missions later that month. Its flights were used to develop accurate polar navigation, survey and map the Arctic, perform comprehensive weather studies, test its men and equipment in Arctic conditions, train in polar navigation and operations, and fly long-range photographic intelligence flights with B-29/F-13A Superfortresses.

== Last flight ==
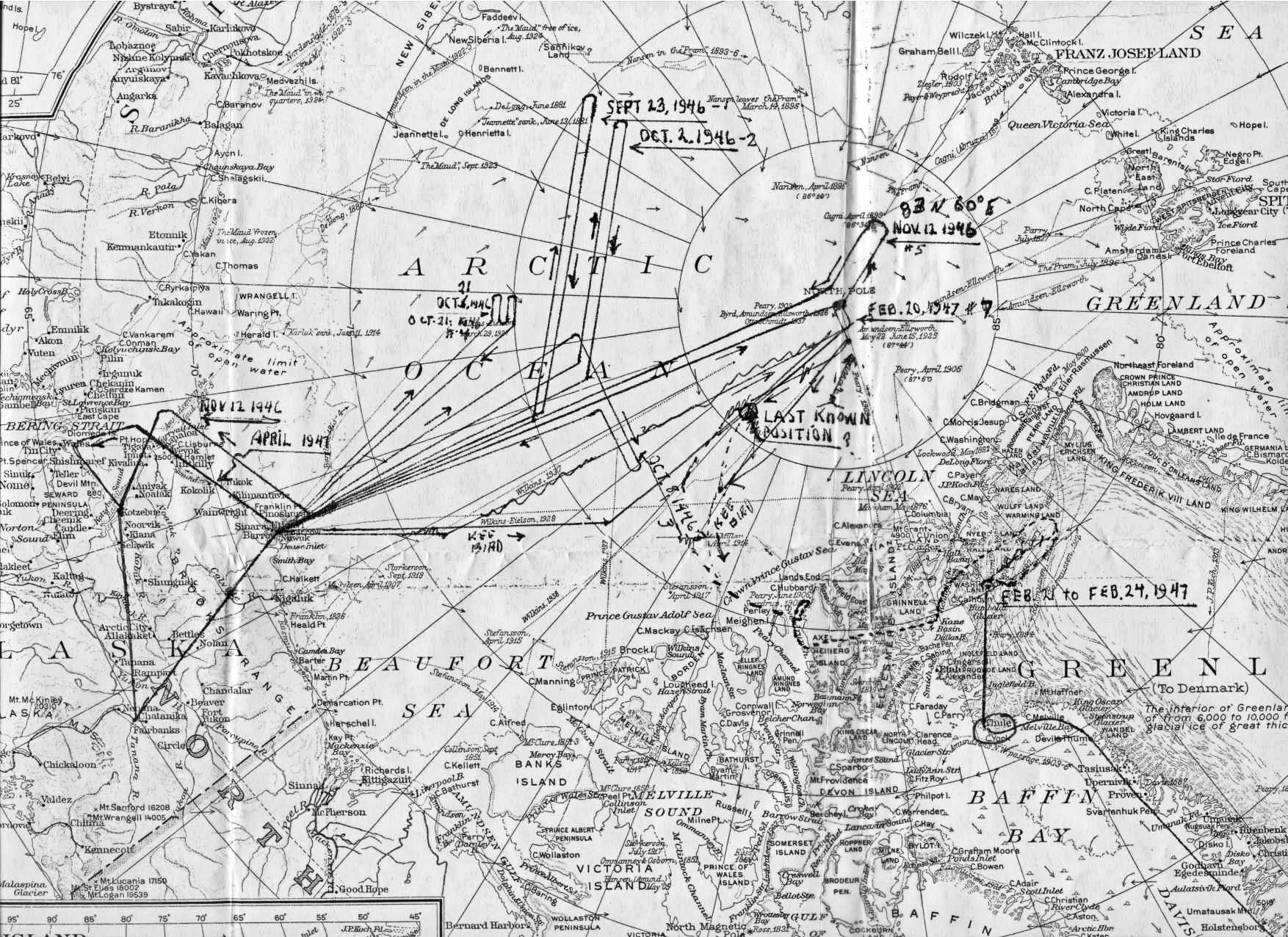
Route of the final flight of Kee Bird

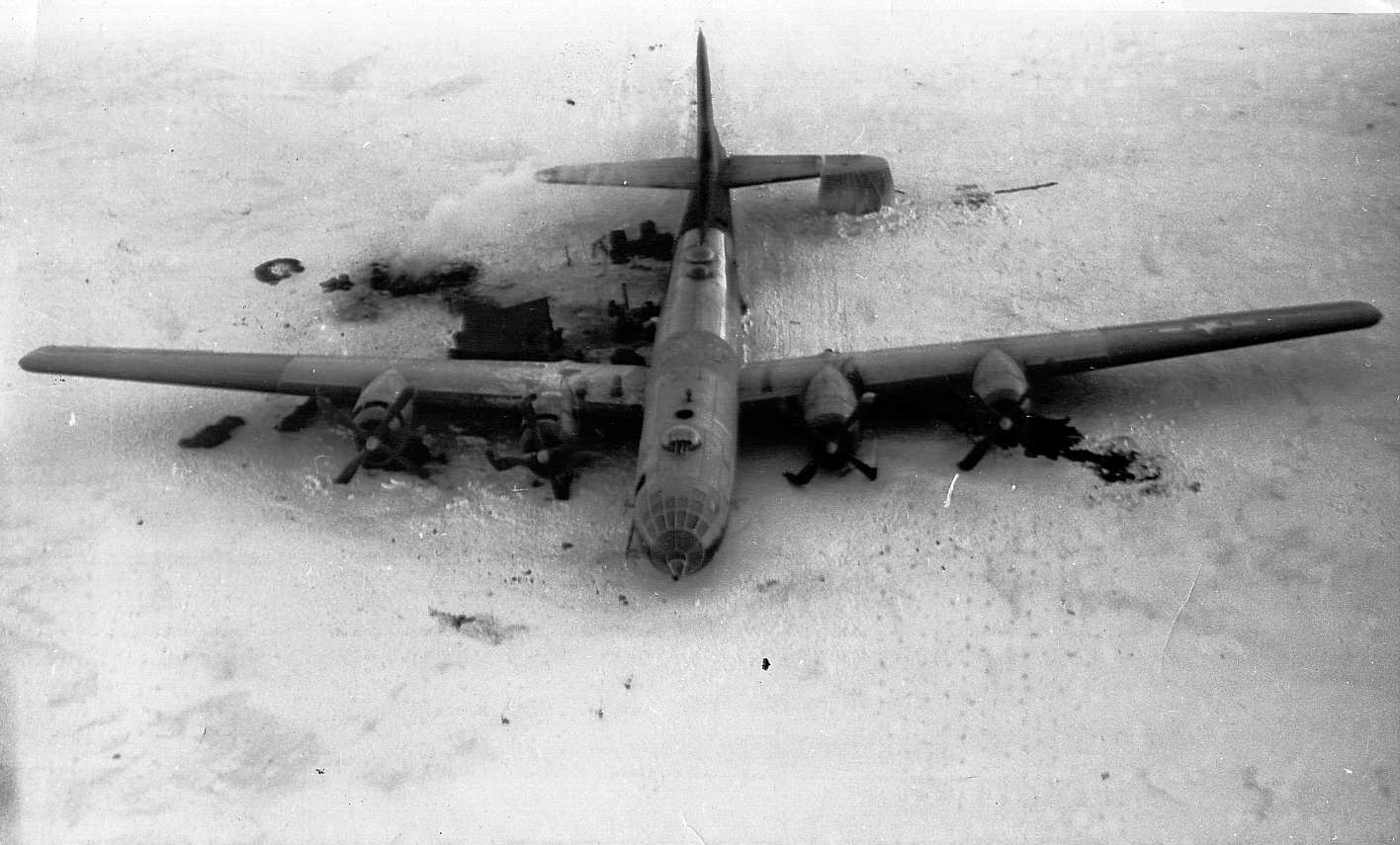
Kee Bird crash site, taken February 1947

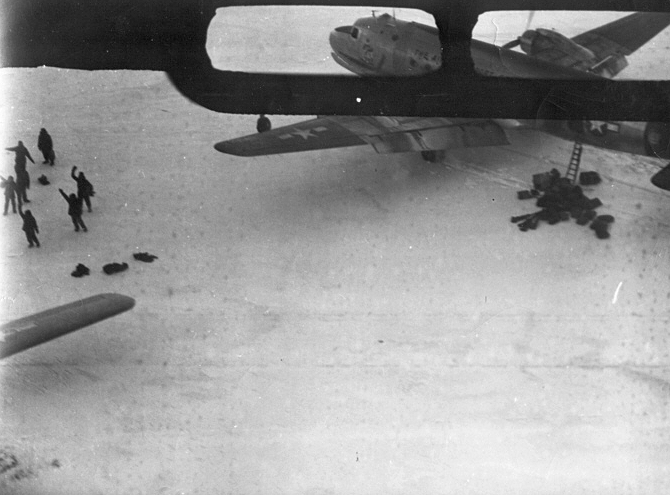
The Kee Bird rescue: A C-54 rescue plane is preparing to pick up the aircrew, shown on the ice waving to the photo plane flying over. The boarding ladder is in place, and take-off from the crash site is imminent.

On 20 February 1947, Lt. Vern H. Arnett took Kee Bird off on a routine mission with a crew of 11 men. This was its seventh mission. All of its missions were classified "top secret". The mission on this occasion was to fly to the geographic North Pole, then fly a return route back to Ladd Field. The aircraft was carrying enough fuel to stay airborne for about 26 hours under normal conditions, having been configured for very long range missions with extra fuel tanks in the unused bomb bays. The mission was expected to last from 12 to 20 hours, making estimated arrival time at Ladd Field around 10:00 am Alaska Standard Time (AT) on 21 February 1947.

"All missions were flown with radio silence to avoid detection. No further report was received on this flight until 0756 AT, 21 February 1947, when Point Barrow CAA Radio Station picked up a radio message from Kee Bird stating that they had no means of steering as the sun was too low." Two minutes later, Arnett reported he had hit a bad storm at 24,000 feet (7,300 m) and was "over land but do not know where". "From this information, it was obvious that an emergency existed and plans were immediately made for starting a search-and-rescue mission if the need developed."

"Other reports were received between 0950 and 0958 AT from 768 stating that 4 minutes of fuel remained, and a crash landing would be made on land or ice. Since no position was given, it was believed that they were lost, and search areas were drawn to aid in locating the crew. From all the information available, it was reasonable to assume that the airplane had landed somewhere along the northern coast of Alaska on their return flight from the Pole".

Lt. Arnett and crew had survived the crash landing without sustaining any injuries. They had landed on a small frozen lake in northern Greenland, which was covered with 2 to 10 in (51 to 254 mm) of hard-packed snow. A later debriefing of the crew indicated that the aircraft had reached the Pole, then made a 70° turn to the southeast, then a 120° turn to the southwest. The pilot became disoriented over the polar icepack just north of 85°N, then began to fly to the south, then east until turning west over northern Greenland, where an emergency landing was successful. The crew had sufficient food and clothing to last them about two weeks.

== Rescue ==
Search aircraft were dispatched from Ladd Field on 21 February. Two B-29's (45-21871 and 45-21761), one B-17 Flying Fortress, and one long-range OA-10A Catalina reconnaissance aircraft were launched. Also available was an Air Transport Command C-74 Globemaster, which was at Ladd in temporary status from Morrison Field, Florida, performing cold-weather testing. All other long-range aircraft in Alaska were alerted for the search, and nine B-29s of the 28th Bomb Group at Elmendorf Field responded to the call to aid in the search, and arrived at Ladd Field on 22 February 1947. Since these aircraft were not equipped with bomb-bay fuel tanks, though, they did not have sufficient range to fly to Greenland. The aircraft returned to their proper station on 23 February 1947. The first plane to take off on the search was the B-17, flown by personnel of the 5th Emergency Rescue Squadron. This plane went directly to Point Barrow and originally was to have participated in the coastline search, but due to later developments, returned to Ladd Field and was not active in the search mission.

The first B-29 to take off was 45-21871. This crew was to search an area from MacKenzie Bay westward for about 50 miles (80 km) inland. When the flight arrived in its search area, a report was received from Barrow Airways stating that they were in contact with a crashed airplane, and a position report would follow shortly. This position report was received about 10 minutes later, and when plotted, indicated that the missing airplane was down on Daugaard-Jensen Land, Greenland, at position 80°N, 61°W, roughly 280 mi (450 km) north of Thule, Greenland (Bluie West Six).

Course was set for the last position received, after consulting the flight engineer about the fuel situation. The coast of Greenland was reached about 2345 AT and a systematic search was started. The twilight period was just beginning when the aircraft reached the search area, which added to the difficulty of sighting activity from the aircraft to the ground. At the completion of the last flight line, at 0130 AT, 22 February 1947, a message was received from the Barrow Airways with instructions for the aircraft to discontinue its search and start its return flight to Ladd Field.

The second search flight took off at 2310 AT, 21 February 1947, in B-29 45-21761 (Boeing's Boner). As the Kee Bird's navigators were constantly making celestial observations to aid the search planes in locating them, the mission was much easier, since more information was received as to the lost airplane's approximate position. In addition, more time was available in which to plan the mission, and a direct course was set to Greenland. On reaching the area where Kee Bird had landed at 0745 AT, a search was started, with information from the lost crew. The first actual sighting was made at 0830 AT. Eight runs were made over the downed plane, dropping the supplies carried for that purpose. Kee Bird's crew requested that some coal be dropped to them so they could build a fire for warmth and cooking. The crew was instructed to destroy the radar, Loran, and the IFF sets, and to bring back, when they were evacuated, all exposed film, airplane files, and maps. The 21761 then returned to Ladd and landed safely.

Around 1900Z, 22 February 1947, Headquarters, Air Transport Command received notification that a SAC B-29 very long range reconnaissance aircraft had made a crash landing in Greenland, at position 80°N, 61°W, about 280 miles (450 km) north of Thule (Bluie West Six). This was the first information received by the Atlantic Division, and plans were made to give every possible assistance.

Two C-54D Skymaster aircraft (42-72640, 42-72643) were alerted for immediate departure from Westover Field, Massachusetts, to Thule (Bluie West Six). The first aircraft, 2640, carried JATO rockets and was ordered to proceed directly to Thule via Goose Bay Airfield, Labrador, with whatever survival equipment and Arctic kits were available at Westover and pick up any additional equipment at Goose Bay flown there from Stephenville by Newfoundland Base Command aircraft. The aircraft was then to proceed direct to Thule and from there to the scene of the crash and search until contact was established. Radio frequencies of the B-29 aircraft were to be furnished as soon as they became available. When contact with the downed B-29 was established, the crew of the C-54 was to airdrop such survival equipment as was available. The aircraft was then to return to Thule for additional supplies as required to be air dropped.

A 1993 photo of Kee Bird, buried in snow

As the aircraft appeared in 1994, prior to the restoration to flying condition

The second C-54 aircraft (2643) was to load Arctic kits at Westover, proceed to Goose Bay, and then proceed to Thule and assist the first aircraft in shuttling between Westover. Goose Bay, Bluie West-1, Bluie West-8, and Bluie West-6 (Thule) for the purpose of laying down Arctic kits, survival equipment, and supplies that may be needed to aid in the rescue of the B-29 crew. The plan of operation was confirmed by teletype to Newfoundland Base Command and all base units in Newfoundland and Greenland Base Command areas.

Lt Bobbie J Cavnar, the pilot of 2640, landed at Thule at 0131Z on 24 February. A ski-equipped C-47 from Ladd Field had arrived at Crystal II, and was requested to stand by if needed. According to the narrative report, "En route from BW-8, the B-29 was contacted and it was discovered that the B-29 was actually on the lake where it was planned to land the C-54. "A mistake of one (1) degree longitude had been made in reporting the plane's position. The mistake was discovered when the pilot of the B-29 reported that the plane was on the lake. Further information from the B-29 indicated the lake was covered with smooth-rolling snow drifts varying from two (2) to ten (10) inches [50–250 mm] in depth with a hard wind crust top". As the underlying ice supported the weight of the B-29, the thickness should be sufficient to support the C-54. A C-54 had the capability to land in up to 10 inches (250 mm) of snow, so the really only unknown factor would be the approaches for landing and take-off from the lake, and this was to be determined by making low passes over the lake.

Discussions were held with "Mr. Edward Goodale, an Arctic specialist, who was the officer in charge of the U.S. Weather Bureau Station at BW-6". He agreed to accompany the C-54 to the scene to assist if anything went wrong. "He also supplied shovels in the event they were needed to clear a runway for take-off after landing. The take-off was planned for the following morning about 09:30 local time to arrive at the scene at high noon when the light would be best." At Thule, the sun appeared above the horizon for the first time on February 24.

JATO bottles were fitted to 2640 at Thule and take-off was made at 1410Z. The 2643 accompanied the rescue aircraft. "The B-29 was easily located due to the fact that the B-29 crew had built a fire of engine oil and rubber rafts which threw off a column of black smoke. Lt Cavnar made two (2) passes over the scene and then landed with very little difficulty at 1543Z. He then taxied up and down to break out a take-off runway. Upon completion of this, all non-essential equipment not required for the flight was removed from the C-54"

"The pilot of the B-29 had already destroyed all classified material and equipment by burning and smashing with an axe." Capt. Setterich in the second C-54 (2643) circled the two planes, taking pictures and making general observations. The crew of the Kee Bird boarded the C-54 and took off at 1625 from the frozen lake assisted by the JATO rockets with all survivors aboard. "After take-off, Lt Pope, Medical Officer from BW-8, examined the survivors but found no frozen parts, but did find mild cases of shock and exposure." After that, all survivors stretched out on sleeping bags and kapok mattresses, and slept as much as possible during the return flight. At 1840, the C-54 landed at Thule, and the survivors and the rescue aircraft crew were given a steak dinner. At 2200, the C-54s departed Thule for nonstop flight to Westover Field, Massachusetts, with all survivors and crew members aboard, arriving at 1243 24 February. The B-29 aircraft was written off and abandoned, and dropped from Air Force inventory records.

== 1947 crew ==
The flight crew for the Kee Bird's final Cold War mission were:

- Vern Arnett, pilot
- Russell S. Jordan, copilot
- Talbert Gates, copilot
- John G. Lesman, astral navigator
- Burl Cowan, D.R. navigator
- Robert "Lucky" Luedke, flight engineer
- Howard Adams, radar observer
- Lawrence Yarborough, gunner
- Ernie Stewart, gunner
- Paul McNamara, gunner
- Robert "Bucky" Leader, radio operator

== Recovery and restoration attempt and fate ==
Photo of the aircraft as it appeared in 1995 just prior to the take-off attempt

Kee Bird on fire on 21 May 1995

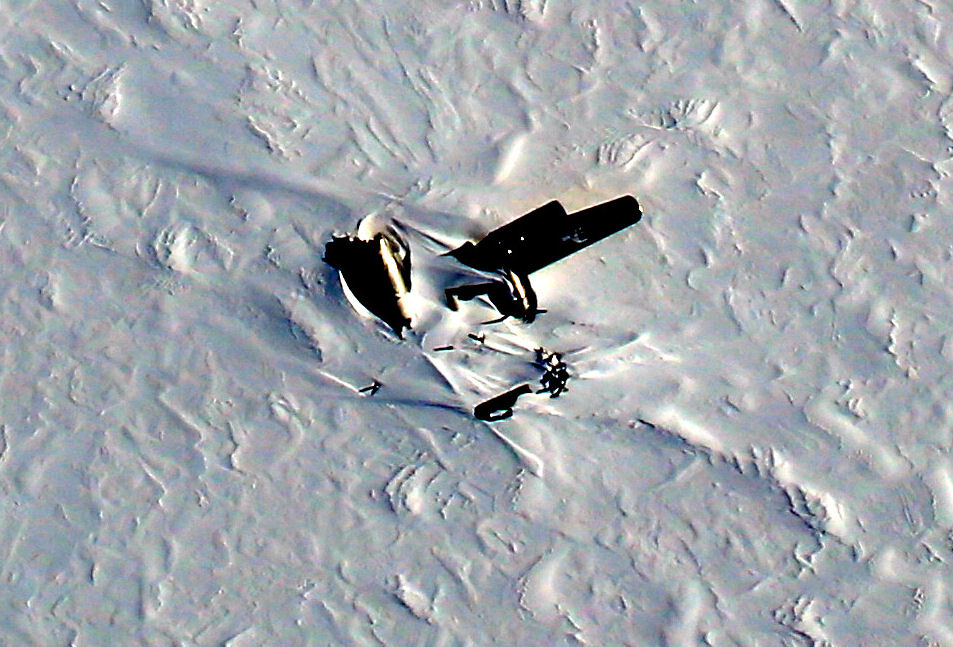
NASA photo showing the remains of Kee Bird, 1 May 2014

In July 1994, a team of aircraft restorers operating as Kee Bird, LLC, was led by Darryl Greenamyer to the emergency landing site. The aircraft had made a successful landing on the frozen lake and had remained relatively intact at the site ever since. The USAF had also surrendered any claim to the B-29. The plane was thought to be able to be put into flying condition, flown out of the site, and ferried to Thule AB, Greenland, where further repairs could be made before flying back to the United States.

Using a 1962 de Havilland Caribou as a shuttle plane, the team departed the U.S. Armed Services base at Thule and flew in tools and equipment to the Kee Bird. Over the summer, the team transported four remanufactured engines, four new propellers, an engine hoist, and new tires, as well as a small bulldozer, to the remote site. The team successfully replaced the engines and propellers, mounted the new tires, and resurfaced the aircraft's control surfaces. As the winter snows began to fall, the chief engineer, Rick Kriege, fell ill and was transported to a hospital in Iqaluit, Canada, where he died from a blood clot two weeks later. Although the plane was nearly ready to fly, Greenamyer's team was compelled by weather to leave the site.

In May 1995, Greenamyer returned with additional personnel. The repairs were completed and the aircraft prepared to take off from the frozen lake on 21 May 1995. A crude runway was carved out of the snow on the ice using the small bulldozer that had been ferried into the site. The new engines were successfully started for the take-off attempt. As Darryl Greenamyer was taxiing the aircraft onto the frozen lake, the jury-rigged fuel tank of the B-29's "putt-putt" auxiliary power unit began to leak gasoline into the rear fuselage. Fire broke out and quickly spread to the rest of the aircraft. The cockpit crew escaped unharmed, but cook/mechanic Bob Vanderveen, who was visually monitoring the engines from the rear of the aircraft, suffered smoke inhalation and flash burns.

Despite attempts to extinguish it from outside the plane, the fire raged and spread through the fuselage. The aircraft was largely destroyed on the ground, with the Kee Bird's fuselage being almost completely destroyed. When the lake thawed in the spring, it was feared that the wreckage (with nearly intact wing panels and engines) would sink to the bottom.

As of 2014, the aircraft sat, broken, crumpled, and burnt in shreds on an ice shelf on the surface.

== In the media ==
The attempted repair and return of the Kee Bird was documented in the British Channel 4 Encounters episode "Treasure of the Humboldt Glacier" first shown on April 23, 1995; it was later shown in the US as "B-29 Frozen in Time" on an episode of the series NOVA on January 30, 1996. The effort to recover the aircraft was also documented in the book Hunting Warbirds: The Obsessive Quest for the Lost Aircraft of World War II by Carl Hoffman, published in 2001.

== Restoration team ==
The restoration team were:

- Darryl Greenamyer, expedition leader and pilot
- Rick Kriege, chief engineer, fell ill at site, died in hospital
- Cecilio Grande, engineer's assistant
- Vernon Rich, toolmaker and machinist
- Roger Von Grote, supply shuttle pilot
- Bob Vanderveen, cook/mechanic

== See also ==
- Glacier Girl, a P-38 Lightning that was rescued from the Greenland ice cap
- My Gal Sal, a B-17E-BO Flying Fortress whose pilot was forced to land it on the Greenland icecap
