= Lost Squadron =

Lost Squadron may refer to:

- The Lost Squadron, 1932 American action film
- Flight 19, five United States Navy aircraft that disappeared over the Bermuda Triangle in 1945
- Glacier Girl and seven other United States Air Force aircraft abandoned in Greenland in 1942
