= Bobbie J Cavnar =

Bobbie Joe Cavnar (October 19, 1924 – February 14, 2002) was a Colonel in the United States Air Force, pilot and the co-founder of The Christian Community of God's Delight.

== Rescue of Kee Bird crew ==
Lt. Bobbie J Cavnar, at the time 22 years old, was the pilot of the C-54 #2640 plane that rescued the 11-man crew of Kee Bird, which was a USAF Boeing B-29 Superfortress, that was marooned in northern Greenland during the Cold War. Lt Cavnar landed the large four-engine transport on an ice-covered lake and took off again. The aircraft was in a standard configuration with wheels for normal ground landings. After circling may times to pick the best possible landing place, he set the plane down successfully. The surface he picked ended up being a frozen lake that was covered with snow drifts. Once landed the stranded 11-man crew was all rescued and flown to Thule, Greenland, which is about 220 miles south of the crash location.

Major General William H. Tunner recommended that Cavnar receive the Distinguished Flying Cross (DFC). Cavnar received his DFC and he and his crew received a tickertape parade in New York City, were decorated by the Chief of Staff of the Air Force, and honored by a joint session of Congress and by President Harry Truman.

== The Christian Community of God's Delight ==
Bobbie Cavnar was a co-founder of The Christian Community of God's Delight (CCGD) which was founded in March 1973. In the early 1970s, Margaret and Bob, with their children, became active in the Catholic charismatic renewal movement. They worked together in spiritual renewal and evangelization ministries for the next 30 years. The CCGD got its name in which the leadership group through prayer received a scripture that mentions a new name of "My Delight".

== Personal life ==
Bobbie J. Cavnar was born in Oklahoma City, October 19, 1924, the son of Byron P. Cavnar and Donnia Mayberry Cavnar. He enlisted in the Army Air Corps in 1942, one day after his eighteenth birthday. Cavnar was married to Margaret Louise Nishimuta. Margaret became a registered nurse and worked as a hospital nurse until her marriage in 1944. She then moved around the country as a military wife during Cavnar's 20-year career in the Air Force. His duty postings included eight years flying the B-36 long-range bomber with the Strategic Air Command in Fort Worth, four years at the Pentagon, and management responsibilities for the Titan Missile program from 1960 to 1964. He was promoted to colonel in 1957 at the age of 33. Amongst his service decorations were the Distinguished Flying Cross, the Legion of Merit, and a special commendation by the Secretary of Defense before Congress in 1964. He retired from the Air Force in 1964.

== Later life ==
After his retirement in 1964, Col. (Ret.) Cavnar and his wife Margaret settled in Dallas, Texas, where they lived until his death in 2002. Col. (Ret.) Bobbie Joe Cavnar was buried in Section: 11 Site: 99 DFW-Ft. Worth National Cemetery. When Margaret Cavnar died in 2006, she was buried next to her husband.
