= My Gal Sal (aircraft) =

Historical B-17 aircraft

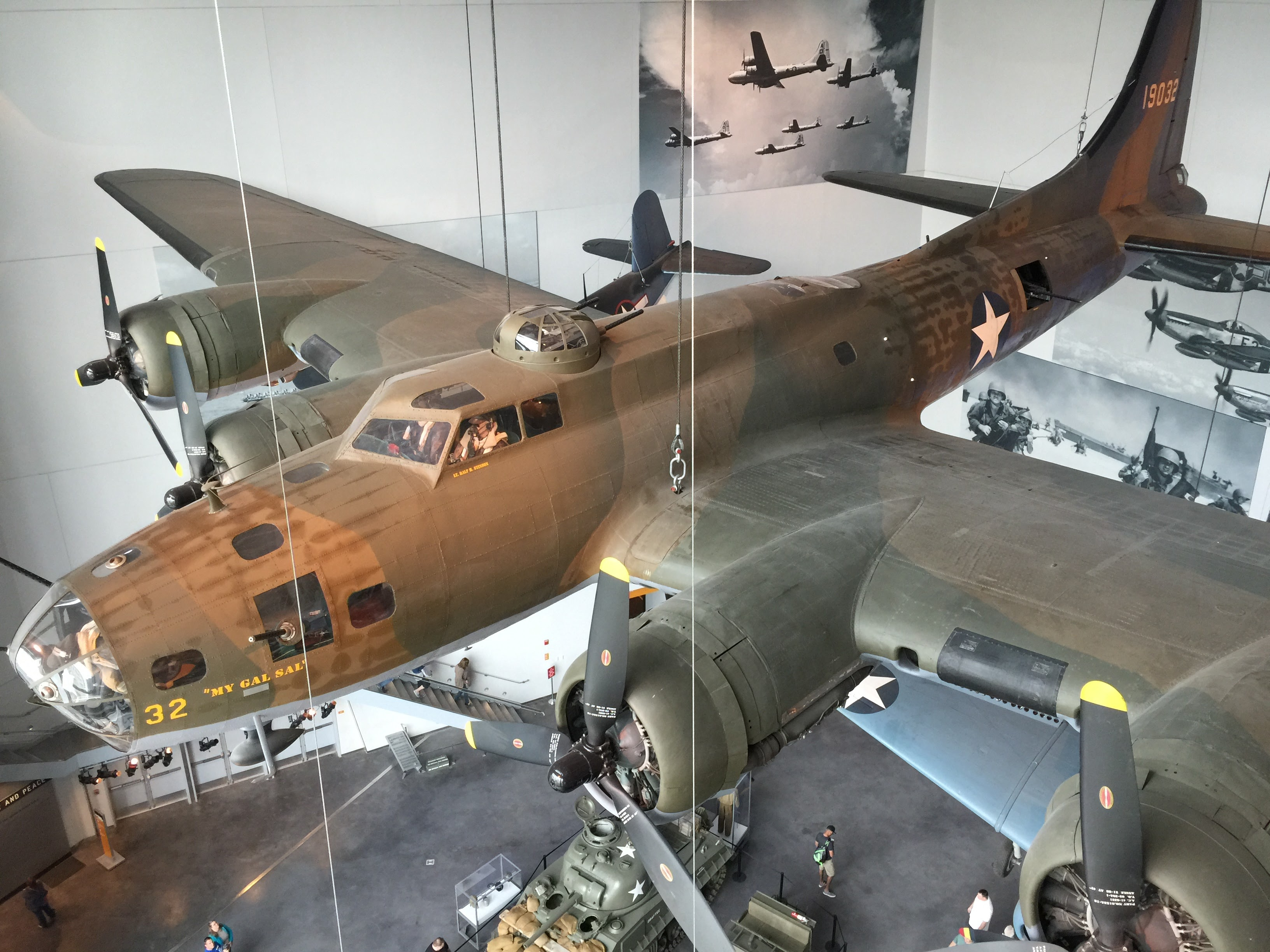
- My Gal Sal at the National World War II Museum

General information
- Type: B-17E-BO Flying Fortress
- Manufacturer: Boeing
- Owners: USAAF
- Serial: 41-9032

History
- In service: 1942
- Preserved at: National World War II Museum, New Orleans, Louisiana

My Gal Sal is a B-17E-BO Flying Fortress whose pilot was forced to land it on the Greenland icecap during World War II. Many years later, it was recovered and returned to the United States to be restored. It is one of only four surviving B-17Es in existence.

== History ==
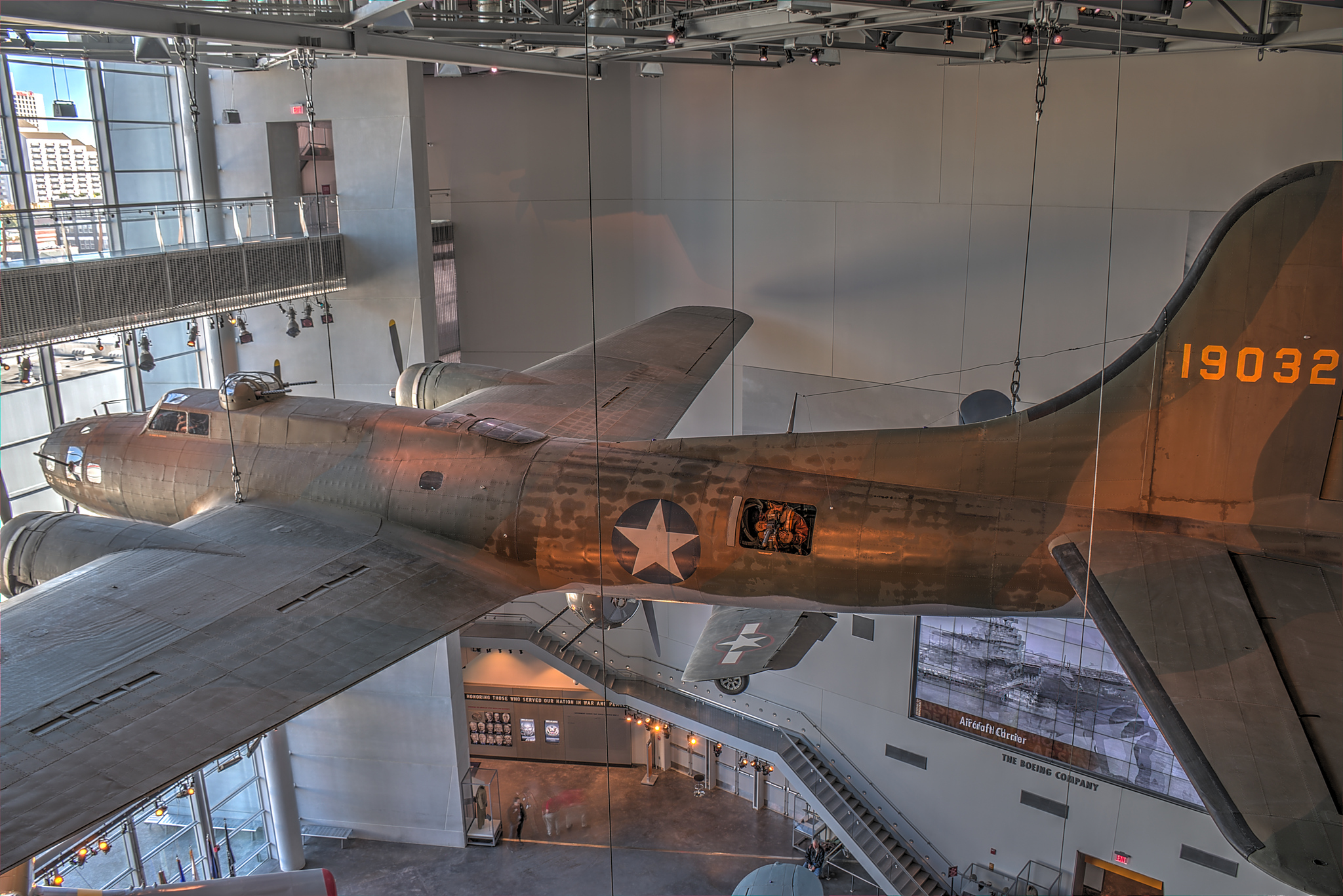
Side view of My Gal Sal

On 27 June 1942, B-17E serial number 41-9032 named My Gal Sal—part of the 342d Bombardment Squadron of the 97th Bombardment Group—was one of 13 B-17s flying the Labrador-to-Greenland leg of a ferry flight to the United Kingdom as part of Operation Bolero, the military build-up in Europe. Inclement weather broke up the flight; five B-17s returned to Labrador, while the remainder continued on to Greenland. Over Greenland three of the aircraft were forced to land by the weather, including My Gal Sal.

The airplane's propellers were damaged by the landing, which kept the engines from being run to generate power needed to use the radio. It took an entire day, but the crew cut off the tips of one of the propellers so that an engine could be run and they were able to make contact. The aircraft's crew camped in the B-17 for nine days until a rescue airplane could arrive. They had to hike the 26 miles (42 km) to a lake where the rescue airplane had been able to land.

The aircraft was abandoned, not to be seen again until a 1964 overflight by a USAF reconnaissance aircraft. At that time, My Gal Sal appeared to be intact.

In 1965, with USAF cooperation, the Society of Automotive Engineers sent a representative to the crash site to gather various materials from My Gal Sal, such as hydraulic fluid, navigational equipment, and rubber. The team wished to understand the long-term effects on the materials from harsh environment of the Arctic and applied these findings to such military programs as the Titan and Minuteman ballistic missiles being maintained in underground silos.

In 1995 My Gal Sal was recovered from the ice, although high winds and the movement of ice over the 53 years since its abandonment had damaged the airframe, separating the tail section of fuselage from the rest of the aircraft and causing additional damage throughout.

The plane was restored to a static configuration at Cincinnati-Blue Ash Airport (ICAO designation: KISZ) in Cincinnati, Ohio, and is now part of the collection of the National World War II Museum in New Orleans, Louisiana.

== See also ==
- Kee Bird, a B-29 Superfortress that made an emergency landing in northwest Greenland after running out of fuel in February 1947
- Glacier Girl, a P-38 Lightning whose pilot was forced to land it on the Greenland icecap in July 1942
