= 46th Reconnaissance Squadron =

46th Expeditionary Reconnaissance Squadron
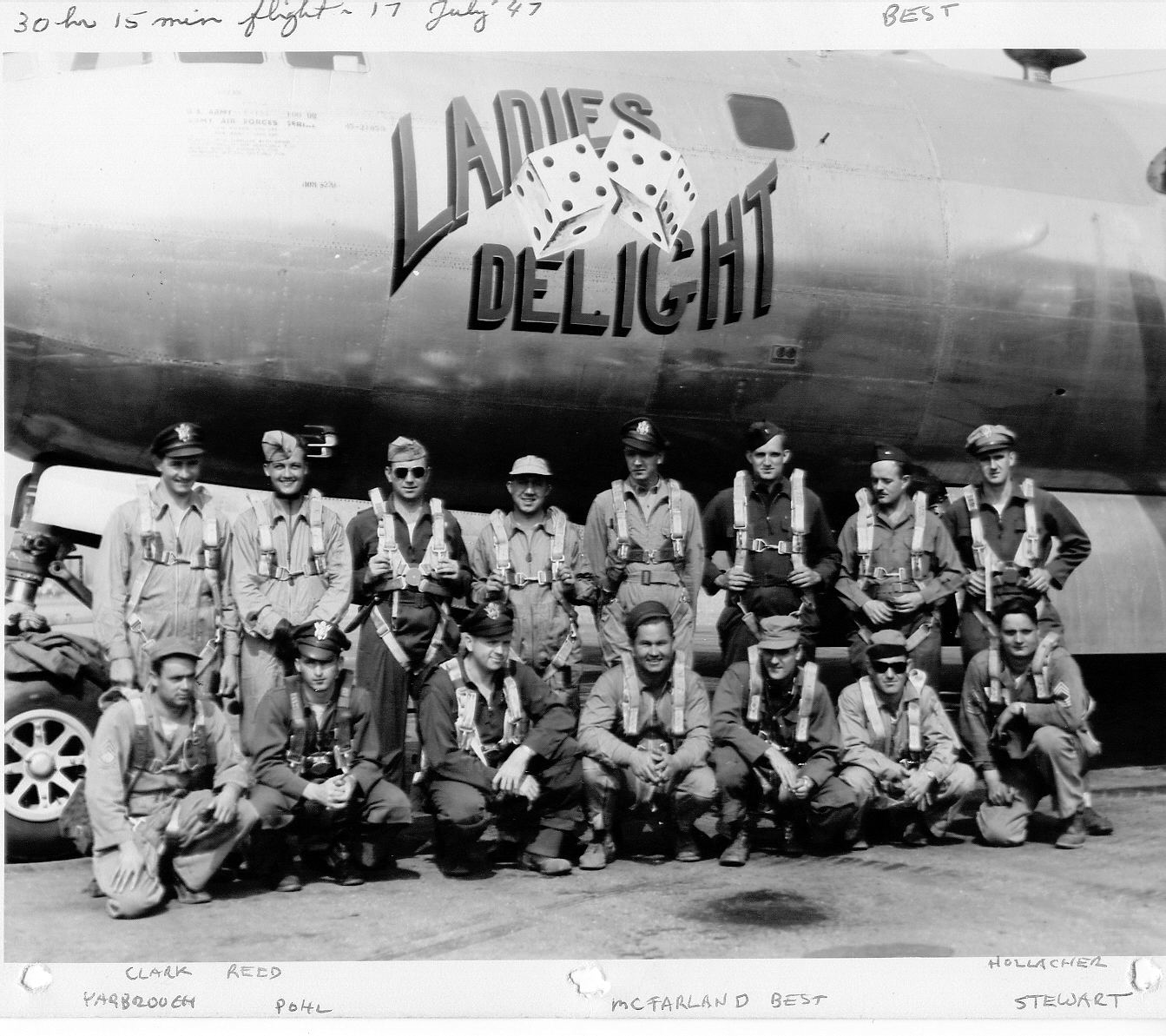
- Crew of USAF Superfortress after record 30-hour, 15-minute flight on 17 July 1947 (Note: Aircraft is Boeing B-29-100-BW Superfortress, serial 45-21869, Ladies Delight. Later modified as EB-29. Baugher, Joe (23 May 2023). "1945 USAF Serial Numbers". Joe Baugher.)
- Active: 1943–1945; 1945–1947; 2003-2011; c. 2013–present
- Country: United States
- Branch: United States Air Force
- Role: Reconnaissance
- Part of: Air Combat Command
- Garrison/HQ: Balad Air Base
- Engagements: European Theater of Operations; Mediterranean Theater of Operations
- Decorations: Distinguished Unit CitationAir Force Meritorious Unit Award; Air Force Outstanding Unit Award

Insignia
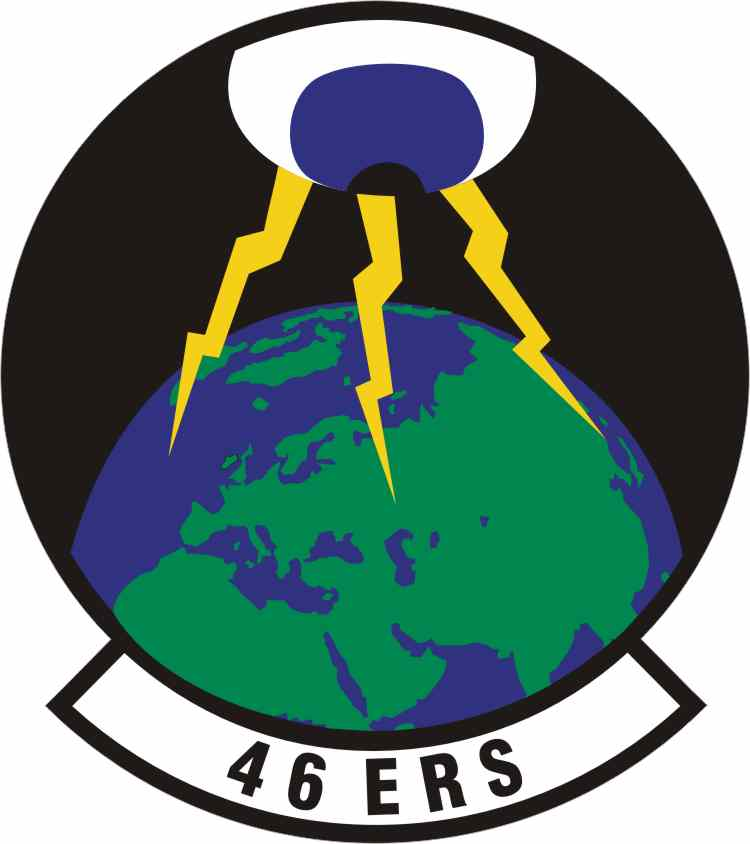
- 46th Expeditionary Reconnaissance Sq emblem

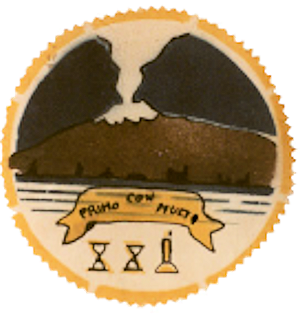
- 719th Bombardment Squadron emblem (World War II)

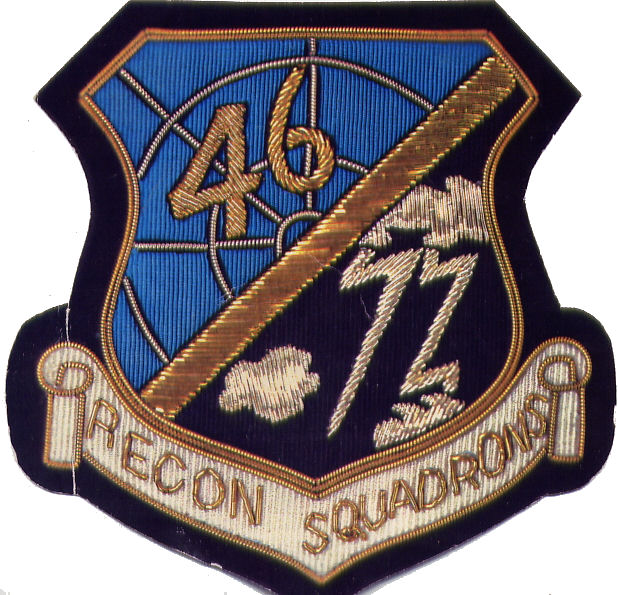
- Patch with unofficial 46th/72d Reconnaissance Squadron emblem

Aircraft flown
- Reconnaissance: MQ-1, MQ-9

The 46th Expeditionary Reconnaissance Squadron is an active Central Command unit of the United States Air Force.

The squadron was first activated as the 719th Bombardment Squadron in May 1943. After training in the United States, the squadron deployed to the Mediterranean Theater of Operations, where it participated in the strategic bombing campaign against Germany. The squadron was awarded two Distinguished Unit Citations for its actions during the war. Following V-E Day, the 716th returned to the United States and was inactivated in June 1945.

The squadron was activated again in September and trained with Boeing B-29 Superfortresses. It was redesignated the 46th Reconnaissance Squadron two months later, becoming one of the first long range reconnaissance units in Strategic Air Command (SAC). In August 1946, the squadron deployed to Ladd Field, Alaska Territory, where it conducted long range aerial reconnaissance over the Arctic. The 46th squadron flew "Project Nanook" to assess the Soviet threat in the Arctic at the beginning of the Cold War. The unit developed the grid system of Navigation which made Arctic navigation routine. The squadron's F-13, serial 45-21848 was the first aircraft to fly over the North Pole on 16 October 1946. It was inactivated on 13 October 1947 and transferred its assets to the 72d Reconnaissance Squadron.

The squadron was converted to provisional status and reformed in 2004 and deployed to Iraq and, later, to Afghanistan.

== History ==
=== World War II ===
The squadron was first activated in May 1943 at Davis-Monthan Field, Arizona as the 719th Bombardment Squadron, one of the four original squadrons of the 449th Bombardment Group. It trained with Consolidated B-24 Liberators at Alamogordo Army Air Field, New Mexico and Bruning Army Air Field, Nebraska before departing for the Mediterranean Theater of Operations in November 1943.

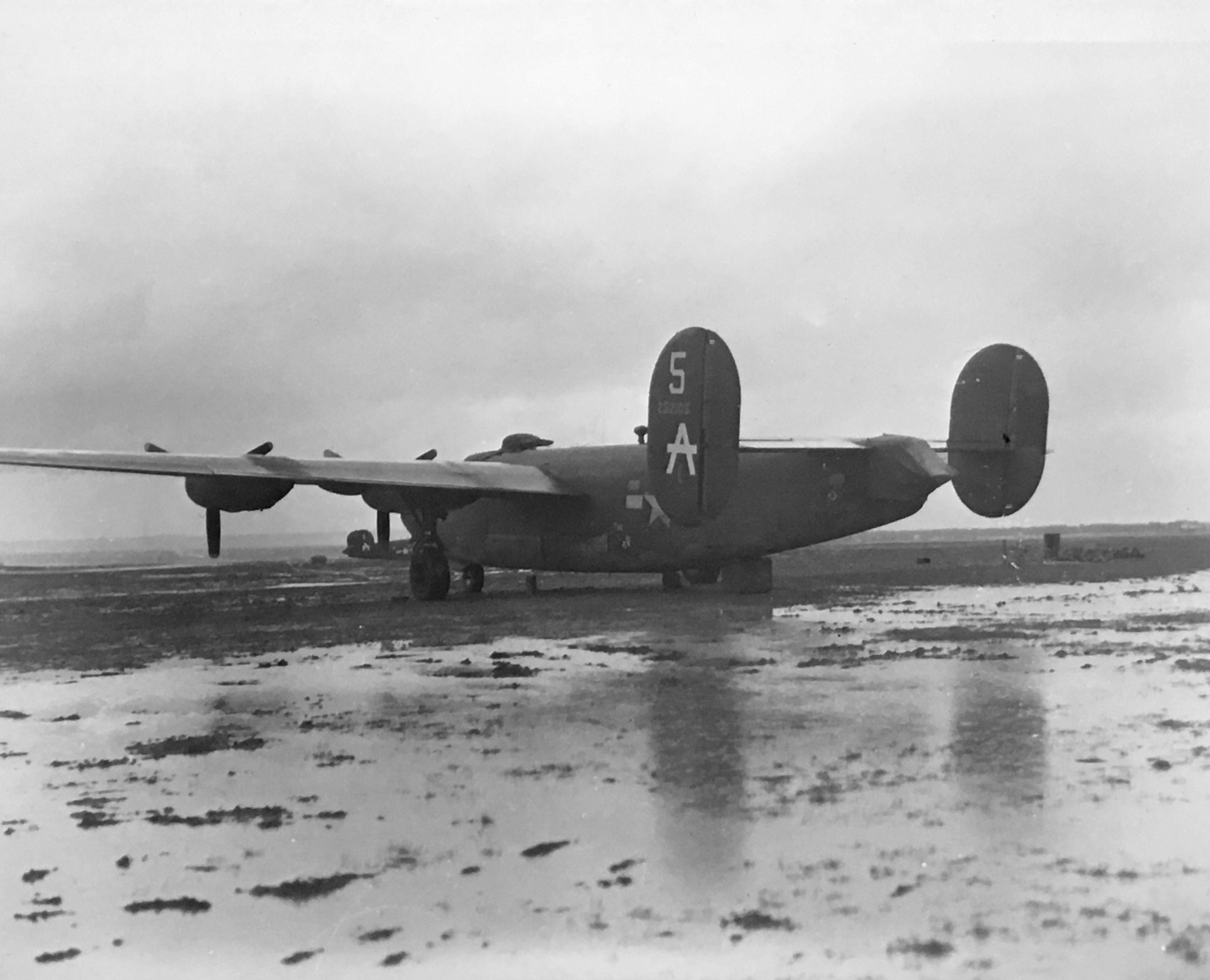
449th Group B-24 in Italy

The squadron assembled at its combat station, Grottaglie Airfield in Southern Italy, in early January 1944, from which it operated primarily on strategic bombing missions. It attacked oil refineries, communications centers, aircraft factories and industrial facilities in Italy, Germany, Czechoslovakia, Hungary, Romania, Albania and Greece. The squadron was awarded a Distinguished Unit Citation (DUC) for its actions on 4 April 1944, when the squadron, along with the other elements of the 449th Group, operated without fighter escort in an attack on railroad marshalling yards near Bucharest. The attacking group was heavily outnumbered by German interceptor aircraft, but not only succeeded in destroying its assigned target, but inflicted heavy losses on the defending fighters. It was awarded a second DUC for an attack against oil refineries near Ploesti, attacking through heavy smoke that obscured the target area and despite intense enemy fire.

The squadron attacked gun emplacements to support Operation Dragoon, the invasion of southern France in August 1944. It attacked troop concentrations, bridges and viaducts during Operation Grapeshot, the Fifteenth Army Group offensive in Northern Italy in the spring of 1945. Shortly after V-E Day, in May 1945, the squadron returned to the United States.

The squadron reformed at Sioux Falls Army Air Field, South Dakota at the end of May. The 449th Group began training with Boeing B-29 Superfortress very heavy bombers. However, very heavy bomber groups were authorized three squadrons, rather than the four squadrons of heavy bomber groups, and the squadron was inactivated In June 1945.

=== Arctic reconnaissance ===
Media related to 46th Reconnaissance Squadron at Wikimedia Commons

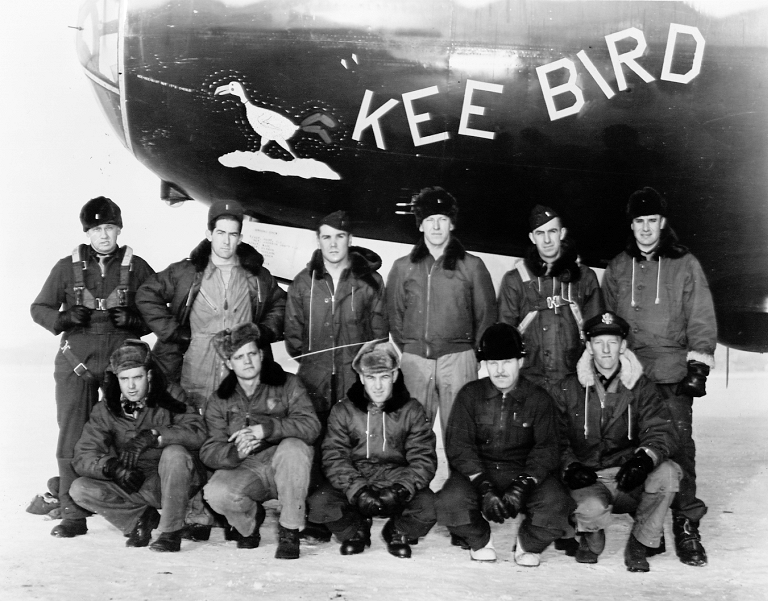
Crew of the Kee Bird which crash-landed in Greenland, February 1947 (Note: The aircraft was a Boeing B-29-95-BW Superfortress, serial 45-21768, later modified as an F-13. The aircrew was rescued and the aircraft was abandoned. A restoration was performed on the aircraft in 1994/95 and the plane was given the civil registration N70887. An attempt was made to fly it from the crash site to Thule Air Base, however a fire occurred during the takeoff attempt and the aircraft was destroyed. Baugher, 1945 USAF Serial Numbers.)

The squadron was reactivated in September 1945 Grand Island Army Air Field, and began training on the B-29. It was redesignated the 46th Reconnaissance Squadron in June 1946. Its new mission was to provide very long range reconnaissance as part of the newly established Strategic Air Command (SAC). The 46th Reconnaissance Squadron was SAC's first operational unit. The squadron was equipped with eighteen reconnaissance-modified Superfortresses. Eight of the aircraft were modified into the F-13A reconnaissance configuration, being fitted with special camera installations for photographic mapping and aerial reconnaissance work. The F-13As carried three K-17B, two K-22 and one K-18 cameras with provisions for others. However, the standard B-29 bombing equipment and defensive armament were retained.

Simultaneously with its redesignation, the squadron moved to Ladd Field, Alaska with a mission to fly reconnaissance and photographic mapping missions over the Arctic and perform reconnaissance along the northern border of Soviet territory in the Arctic, as well as deep-penetration reconnaissance flights. All of its missions were classified as Top Secret, the classification wasn't dropped until 2001. In August, the squadron was transferred from SAC to Alaskan Air Command.

The squadron flew its first operational mission on 2 August 1946 from its base at Ladd, eventually flying more than 5,000 hours in the Arctic and over 1,000,000 miles in its first year of operations, testing material and the limits of flying personnel in the Arctic. It made the first aircraft flight over the Geographic North Pole on 16 October 1946, eventually accomplishing over 100 flights to the pole and its immediate vicinity. It performed photo mapping of 5,500,000 square miles of the Arctic, including areas for the strategic location of defense components, and future locations of radar sites along the northern Canadian region. Exploratory flights were made to obtain information necessary to establish commercial airline service over the Arctic.

When the squadron arrived in Alaska, large areas of the territory and northern Canada were largely unexplored. The squadron developed means of polar navigation necessary due to the unreliability of magnetic compasses, and many existing maps of the region were unreliable. The grid system of navigation was developed which enabled navigators to navigate to locations within one mile of accuracy.

The squadron was inactivated on 13 October 1947. Its mission, personnel and equipment were transferred to the 72d Reconnaissance Squadron, which was simultaneously activated. The 72d continued the arctic reconnaissance mission until moving to the United States in June 1949. The two units are sometimes referred to as the 46th/72d Reconnaissance Squadron and a former alumni group was titled the 46th/72d Recon Association.

=== Expeditionary operations ===
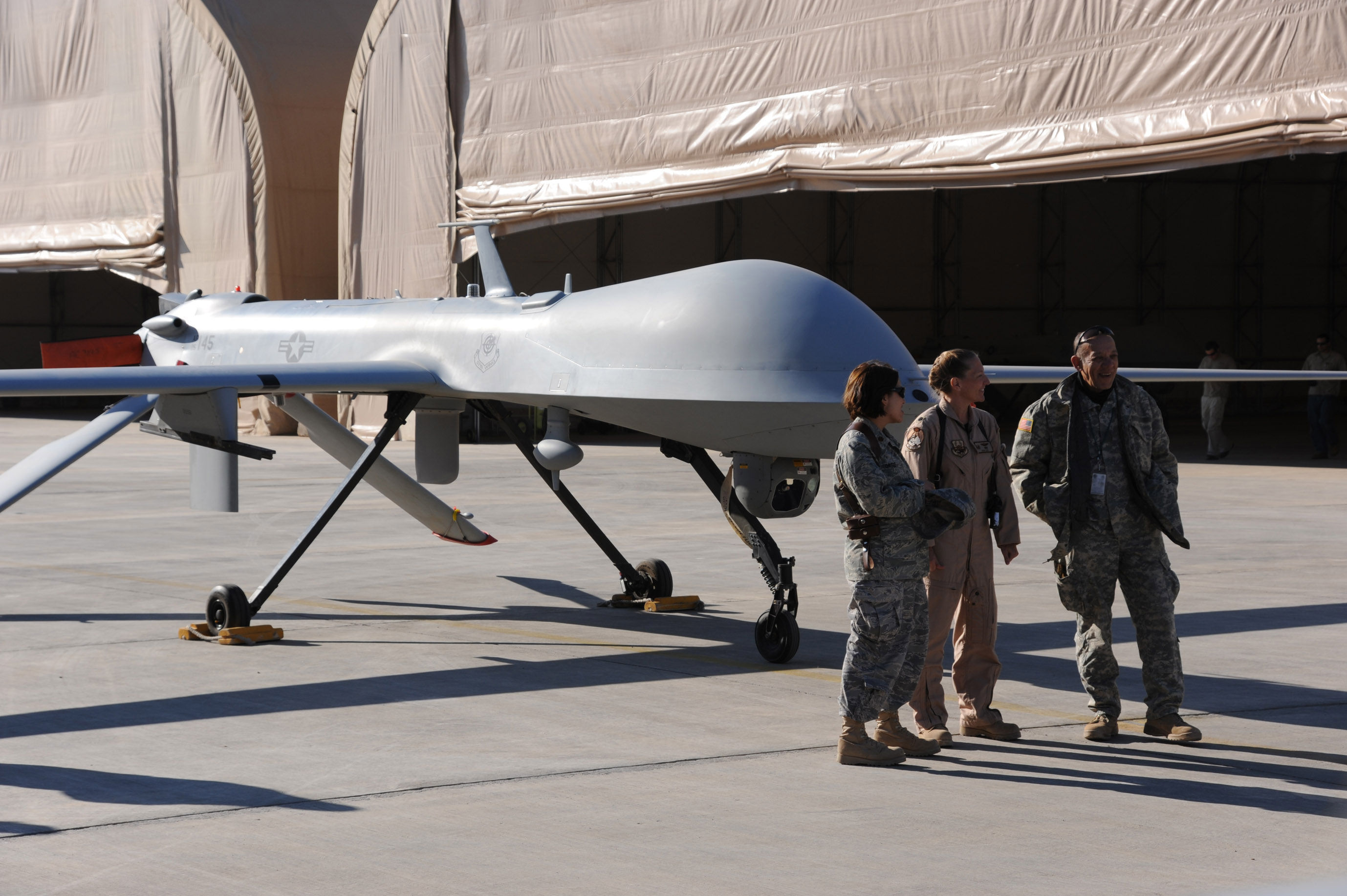
46th Expeditionary Reconnaissance Squadron MQ-1B Predator at Balad AB Iraq

The squadron was converted to provisional status as the 46th Expeditionary Reconnaissance Squadron and was assigned to the 332d Expeditionary Operations Group. It deployed to Tallil Air Base, Iraq with the General Atomics MQ-1 Predator as part of Operation Iraqi Freedom under the command of the 332d Air Expeditionary Wing. Sometime between then and June 2004 the unit moved to Joint Base Balad. Sometime between June 2004 and 2009 the unit was renamed to "46th Expeditionary Reconnaissance and Attack Squadron". During May 2016 the unit was noticed operating from Ali Al Salem Airbase, Kuwait, against Da'esh as part of the Military intervention against ISIL operating over Iraq and Syria under the 386th Air Expeditionary Wing.

The squadron replaced its Predators with General Atomics MQ-9 Reapers, becoming the 46th Expeditionary Attack Squadron. It carried out its first mission with the Block 5 Reaper in support of Operation Inherent Resolve on 20 October 2017. Squadron members prepare its UAVs for missions and control their takeoff and landing, During flight, they are handed off to pilots and sensor operators in the United States for control through satellite systems. Local control by the 46th is required during takeoff and landing due to the short delay inherent in the satellite based communications links used by controllers at Creech Air Force Base, Nevada.

== Lineage ==
- Constituted as the 719th Bombardment Squadron (Heavy) on 6 April 1943

Activated on 1 May 1943
Redesignated 719th Bombardment Squadron, Very Heavy on 7 September 1945
Inactivated on 11 June 1945

- Redesignated 719th Bombardment Squadron, Very Heavy on 7 September 1945

Activated on 17 September 1945
Redesignated 46th Reconnaissance Squadron (Very Long Range, Photographic) on 1 June 1946
Inactivated on 13 October 1947

- Converted to provisional status and redesignated: 46th Expeditionary Reconnaissance Squadron c. 2003

Activated c. 10 September 2003
Inactivated c. 2011

- Redesignated 46th Expeditionary Attack Squadron

Activated c. 2013

=== Assignments ===
- 449th Bombardment Group, 1 May 1943 – 11 June 1945
- 449th Bombardment Group, 17 September 1945
- Fifteenth Air Force (SAC), 4 August 1946
- Alaskan Air Command, 19 August 1946
- Yukon Sector, Alaskan Air Command, 1 October 1946 – 13 October 1947
- 332d Expeditionary Operations Group, 10 September 2003 – c. 2011
- 386th Air Expeditionary Wing, unknown - present

=== Stations ===
- Davis-Monthan Field, Arizona, 1 May 1943
- Alamogordo Army Air Field, New Mexico, 5 July 1943
- Bruning Army Air Field, Nebraska, 12 September–26 November 1943
- Grottaglie Airfield, Italy, 3 January 1944 – 15 May 1945
- Sioux Falls Army Air Field, South Dakota, 29 May-11 June 1945
- Grand Island Army Air Field, Nebraska, 17 September 1945
- Ladd Field, Alaska, 1 June 1946 – 13 October 1947
- Ali Air Base, Iraq, c. 10 September 2003
- Balad Air Base, Iraq, June 2004 - c. 2011
- Ali Al Salem Air Base, Kuwait, c. 2013 – present

=== Aircraft ===
- Consolidated B-24 Liberator, 1943–1945
- Boeing B-17 Flying Fortress, 1945
- Boeing B-29 Superfortress, 1945–1947
- Boeing F-13 Superfortess, 1945–1947
- General Atomics MQ-1 Predator, 2004–present
- General Atomics MQ-9 Reaper, unknown-present

=== Awards and campaigns ===
Award streamer	Award	Dates	Notes
	Distinguished Unit Citation	4 April 1944	Bucharest, Rumania 719th Bombardment Squadron
	Distinguished Unit Citation	9 July 1944	Ploesti, Rumania 719th Bombardment Squadron
	Air Force Meritorious Unit Award	1 June 2009-31 May 2010	46th Expeditionary Reconnaissance Squadron
	Air Force Meritorious Unit Award	1 June 2010-31 May 2011	46th Expeditionary Reconnaissance Squadron
	Air Force Meritorious Unit Award	1 June 2011-19 December 2011	46th Expeditionary Reconnaissance Squadron
	Air Force Meritorious Unit Award	1 June 2011-31 May 2012	46th Expeditionary Reconnaissance Squadron
	Air Force Meritorious Unit Award	1 June 2015-31 May 2016	46th Expeditionary Reconnaissance Squadron

Campaign Streamer	Campaign	Dates	Notes
	American Theater without inscription	1 May 1943 – 26 November 1943	719th Bombardment Squadron
	Air Offensive, Europe	c. 6 January 1944 – 5 June 1944	719th Bombardment Squadron
	Naples-Foggia	c. 6 January 1944 – 21 January 1944	719th Bombardment Squadron
	Air Combat, EAME Theater	c. 6 January 1944 – 11 May 1945	719th Bombardment Squadron
	Anzio	22 January 1944 – 24 May 1944	719th Bombardment Squadron
	Rome-Arno	22 January 1944 – 9 September 1944	719th Bombardment Squadron
	Central Europe	22 March 1944 – 21 May 1945	719th Bombardment Squadron
	Normandy	6 June 1944 – 24 July 1944	719th Bombardment Squadron
	Northern France	25 July 1944 – 14 September 1944	719th Bombardment Squadron
	Southern France	15 August 1944 – 14 September 1944	719th Bombardment Squadron
	North Apennines	10 September 1944 – 4 April 1945	719th Bombardment Squadron
	Rhineland	15 September 1944 – 21 March 1945	719th Bombardment Squadron
	Po Valley	3 April 1945 – 8 May 1945	719th Bombardment Squadron
	Iraqi Governance	29 June 2004 – 15 December 2005	46th Expeditionary Reconnaissance Squadron
	National Resolution	16 December 2005 – 9 January 2007	46th Expeditionary Reconnaissance Squadron
	Iraqi Surge	10 January 2007 – 31 December 2008	46th Expeditionary Reconnaissance Squadron
	Iraqi Sovereignty	1 January 2009 – 31 August 2010	46th Expeditionary Reconnaissance Squadron
	New Dawn	1 September 2010 – 31 December 2011	46th Expeditionary Reconnaissance Squadron
	Consolidation III	1 December 2006 – 30 June 2011	46th Expeditionary Reconnaissance Squadron
	Global War on Terror Expeditionary Medal		46th Expeditionary Reconnaissance Squadron

== See also ==
- Kee Bird
