= Operation Bolero =

US military building up in the UK in WWII

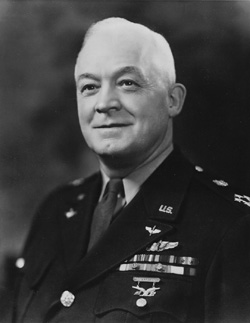
Major General Henry H. Arnold.

Operation Bolero was the commonly used reference for the code name of the United States military troop buildup in the United Kingdom during World War II in preparation for the initial cross-channel invasion plan known as Operation Roundup, to be implemented in mid-1943. Also for its lesser contingency alternative, Operation Sledgehammer, to be executed in the fall of 1942 in the event of German setbacks or to ease Axis pressure on the Eastern Front. ("Bolero" was the code name used in official communications to stand in for "United Kingdom" when describing the theater or movements.)

What later became the Bolero plan – the buildup of a strategic air force in the United Kingdom, in preparation for Roundup – was first submitted by Commanding General of the U.S. Army Air Forces, Henry H. Arnold, to General George Marshall, the U.S. Army Chief of Staff, on April 12, 1942, and set in motion a huge movement of men and material that laid the groundwork for Operation Overlord.

To complement the Roundup invasion plan, planning for the movement and basing of U.S. forces in the United Kingdom was begun at the end of April 1942 and given the code name of Bolero. A combined committee of key British and American logistical officers worked in both Washington, D.C., and London planning the build-up, to co-ordinate the effort on the highest level. On 5 May 1942, Gen. George Marshall and Commanding General, Services of Supply, Lt. Gen. Brehon B. Somervell named Major General John C. H. Lee as Commanding General, Services of Supply, U.S. Army Forces, British Isles. Lee would spend two weeks in Washington on initial planning and selecting key staff, and then fly to England on 24 May 1942 to commence the operation, and begin work on the hundreds of bases, airfields, warehouses, depots, hospitals, and storage tanks that would support the 3 million U.S. military personnel eventually coming overseas.

In May 1942, with a tentative target date for Roundup of April 1943, the Operations Division of the War Department and USAAF Headquarters drafted plans to transport and house a million American troops: 525,000 ground troops, 240,000 air force troops, and 235,000 from Services of Supply. Arnold's plan to Marshall called for the basing by 1 April 1943, of 21 heavy bomb groups (Boeing B-17 Flying Fortress and Consolidated B-24 Liberator), 8 medium bomb groups (Martin B-26 Marauder and North American B-25 Mitchell), 9 light bomb groups (Douglas A-20 Havoc), 17 fighter groups (Lockheed P-38 Lightning, Bell P-39 Airacobra, Curtiss P-40 Warhawk, and Republic P-47 Thunderbolt), 6 observation groups, and 8 transport groups—a total of 69 combat groups plus their service units.

General Arnold met with RAF Air Chief Marshal Charles Portal at the end of May 1942 and presented the U.S. schedule for the arrival of U.S. Army Air Forces into the theater by March 1943, totalling 3,649 aircraft. The proposed build-up anticipated 15 groups in July, 35 by November and 66 by March, excluding observation squadrons. Arnold anticipated that by the April 1 deadline, the combat units of the Eighth Air Force would have 800 heavy bombers, 600 medium bombers, 342 light bombers, and 960 fighters. (At the time the actual strength of the Eighth in the United Kingdom was 1,871 troops and no aircraft).

== Bolero movement of air groups ==
The movement of the assigned air combat groups began in May 1942 with the shipment by fast troopships (usually former ocean liners) of their ground echelons. The movement of their aircraft began in June after the decision was made that the most efficient and rapid buildup could be made by having the groups themselves ferry their planes overseas. Fighters, having only a single crewman and not equipped with proper navigational and communications equipment for trans-oceanic flights, were to be divided into flights of four and escorted by single bombers navigating the route for them.

Three groups were assigned for the first phase of movement: the 97th Bomb Group (B-17 Flying Fortress), 1st Fighter Group (P-38 Lightning), and 60th Troop Carrier Group (Douglas C-47 Skytrain). These groups were gathered on the east coast in what was termed the "concentration area" to stage for the overseas flights via the northern ferry route. Ironically, all of these groups, originally tasked for the Eighth Air Force, saw limited duty in England and were transferred to the Twelfth Air Force.

An anticipated loss rate of 10% for the first movement did not materialize and instead was 5.2%. The largest loss occurred July 15, 1942, when six P-38s of the 94th Fighter Squadron, 1st Fighter Group, and two B-17s of the 97th Bomb Group, on the Greenland-to-Iceland leg, were forced by weather to attempt to return to Greenland. Running low on fuel, all eight force-landed on the Greenland ice cap. The aircraft, although apparently recoverable, were abandoned after all of their crews had been safely recovered. One of the P-38s, subsequently named Glacier Girl, was recovered from under ice in 1992, and has been restored to flying condition.

By the end of August 1942, the Bolero movement had transferred 386 airplanes: 164 P-38's of the 1st and 14th Fighter Groups; 119 B-17's of the 97th, 301st, and 92nd Bomb Groups; and 103 C-47's of the 60th and 64th Troop Carrier Groups, all of which became part of the Twelfth Air Force in Africa before the end of the year. 920 airplanes had been sent from the United States to England by the end of 1942, and 882 had arrived safely, almost all of them delivered by their combat crews and not specialized ferry command personnel.

== Bolero superseded ==
By July 1, demands from other theaters had caused a downward revision of the Bolero build-up to a total of 54 groups and 194,332 men. Later that month USAAF Headquarters estimated that by December 31, 1943, the Bolero build-up could have in place 137 groups (approximately half of the entire projected strength of the USAAF), including 74 bomb groups of all types and 31 fighter groups. It estimated that 375,000 airmen would comprise the force, 197,000 in combat units and 178,000 in the service organizations. The estimate proved to be remarkably close, particularly the size of the heavy bomber force, to the actual strength of the combined Eighth and Ninth Air Forces at the time of Operation Overlord.

In London the Bolero Committee drew up plans for the accommodation of 1,147,000 troops, including 137,000 replacements, in the United Kingdom by the end of March 1943. But by the end of July, plans for Sledgehammer had been abandoned and Roundup postponed until 1944 in favor of Operation Torch, an invasion of North Africa to establish a base of operations for the invasion of Southern Europe. The Bolero committee thus found its work limited to providing assistance in the planning for Torch. Buildup plans for the invasion of Europe later became the province of the Overlord planners.

== Sources and links ==
- The Army Air Forces in World War II online
- Orders to 1st FG for Bolero movement
