= Project Nanook =

Cold War reconnaissance effort of the United States

Project NANOOK was a Cold War reconnaissance effort of the United States that used the 1st RB-29 missions for mapping and visual reconnaissance in the Arctic and along the Northern Soviet Coast.
