= Operation Roundup (1942) =

Allied plan to invade Northern France in WWII

Operation Roundup was the codename for a plan to invade Northern France in the spring of 1943 prepared by Allied forces during World War II.

== History ==
Overseen by Brigadier General Dwight D. Eisenhower, the plan was developed in early 1942 and reflected American enthusiasm for an early entry into Europe.

Shortages of merchant shipping, landing craft, and other resources caused the plan for Roundup to be considered as unrealistic. It called for a force consisting of 48 Allied divisions and 5,800 aircraft, with a landing on broad beachheads between the French ports of Boulogne and Le Havre. (Note: By comparison, the eventual Normandy landings, which occurred over a year later in June 1944, and the subsequent campaign, featured only 39 Allied divisions.) Senior British commanders and politicians were reluctant to commit themselves to the invasion plan; mindful of the painful losses during the First World War's Battle of the Somme (where, on the first day of the battle, the British Army had suffered almost 60,000 casualties) and Battle of Passchendaele.

Winston Churchill, the Prime Minister of the United Kingdom, preferred a strategy of attacking the Wehrmacht, the German forces, in the Mediterranean Sea instead (which he referred to as the "soft underbelly"). Churchill's plan would allow relatively inexperienced American forces to gain experience in a less risky theatre of war while they gradually built up to be overwhelming before they engaged Germany head on.

After Churchill pressed for a landing in French North Africa in 1942, General George Marshall, the U.S. Army Chief of Staff, suggested instead to U.S. President Franklin Roosevelt for the United States to abandon the Germany-first strategy and take the offensive in the Pacific War. Roosevelt "disapproved" the proposal, saying it would do nothing to help the Soviet Union. Instead, with Roosevelt's support and Marshall unable to persuade the British to change their minds, the decision was made at the Second Claridge Conference in late July 1942 to carry out Operation Torch, the Allied invasion of French North Africa. That was a compromise by allowing the U.S. to engage in the fight against Nazi Germany on a limited scale and to meet the British objective of securing victory in North Africa. Most of the troops and supplies accumulated for Roundup were used to implement Torch with preparations for Roundup given lower priority because of the uncertainties of Allied strategy.

In November 1942, Eisenhower, now a lieutenant general, told Churchill that no major operation on the Continent could be carried out before 1944. Briefings concerning the plan brought Eisenhower’s organizational and diplomatic skills to the attention of senior civil and military leaders in the United States and Europe, launching his meteoric rise to Supreme Allied Commander in Europe.

Operation Roundup included Operation Sledgehammer and the later variant, Operation Roundhammer. British Lieutenant General Frederick E. Morgan incorporated aspects of the plan into the earliest version of the plan that became Operation Overlord.

== See also ==
- Diplomatic history of World War II
- List of Allied World War II conferences
- Operation Bolero
