= Glacier Girl =

Restored Lockheed P-38 Lightning

Coordinates: 65.2999°N 40.0666°W

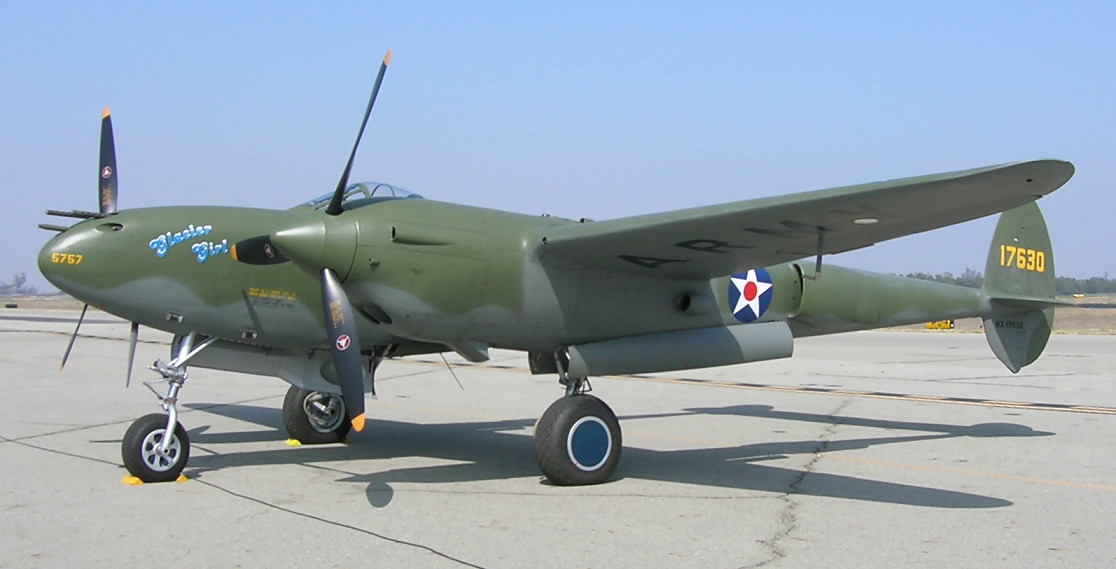
- Glacier Girl

General information
- Type: Lockheed P-38F-1-LO Lightning
- Manufacturer: Lockheed Corporation
- Owners: United States Army Air Forces
- Serial: 41-7630

Glacier Girl is a Lockheed P-38 Lightning, World War II fighter plane, 41-7630, c/n 222-5757, restored to flying condition after being buried beneath the Greenland ice sheet for over 50 years.

Glacier Girl was part of the Lost Squadron.

== Operational history ==
On 15 July 1942, due to poor weather and limited visibility, six P-38 fighters of 94th Fighter Squadron/1st FG and two B-17 bombers of a bombardment squadron were forced to return to Greenland en route to Great Britain during Operation Bolero and made emergency landings on the ice field. All the crew members were subsequently rescued, but Glacier Girl, along with the unit's five other fighters and the two B-17's, were eventually buried under 268 feet (82 m) of snow and ice that built up over the ensuing decades.

== Recovery and restoration ==
Fifty years later, in 1992, the plane was brought to the surface by members of the Greenland Expedition Society after years of searching and excavation. The aircraft was eventually transported to Middlesboro, Kentucky, where it was restored to flying condition. The excavation of Glacier Girl was documented in an episode of the History Channel's Mega Movers series, titled "Extreme Aircraft Recovery".

The Lightning returned to the air in October 2002.

On June 22, 2007, Glacier Girl departed Teterboro Airport, New Jersey, in an attempt to fly across the Atlantic Ocean to Duxford, England, to complete the flight it had begun 65 years earlier. On 28 June, however, a coolant leak in the number-two (right) engine grounded the plane in Happy Valley-Goose Bay, Labrador. On July 22, 2007, repairs were completed in Labrador, which included installation of two overhauled Allison engines. Glacier Girl returned to the U.S. on July 23, and can now be seen at air shows in the USA.

In 2007, Glacier Girl was sold to Lewis Energy's CEO, Rodney Lewis.

== Return mission in 2016 ==
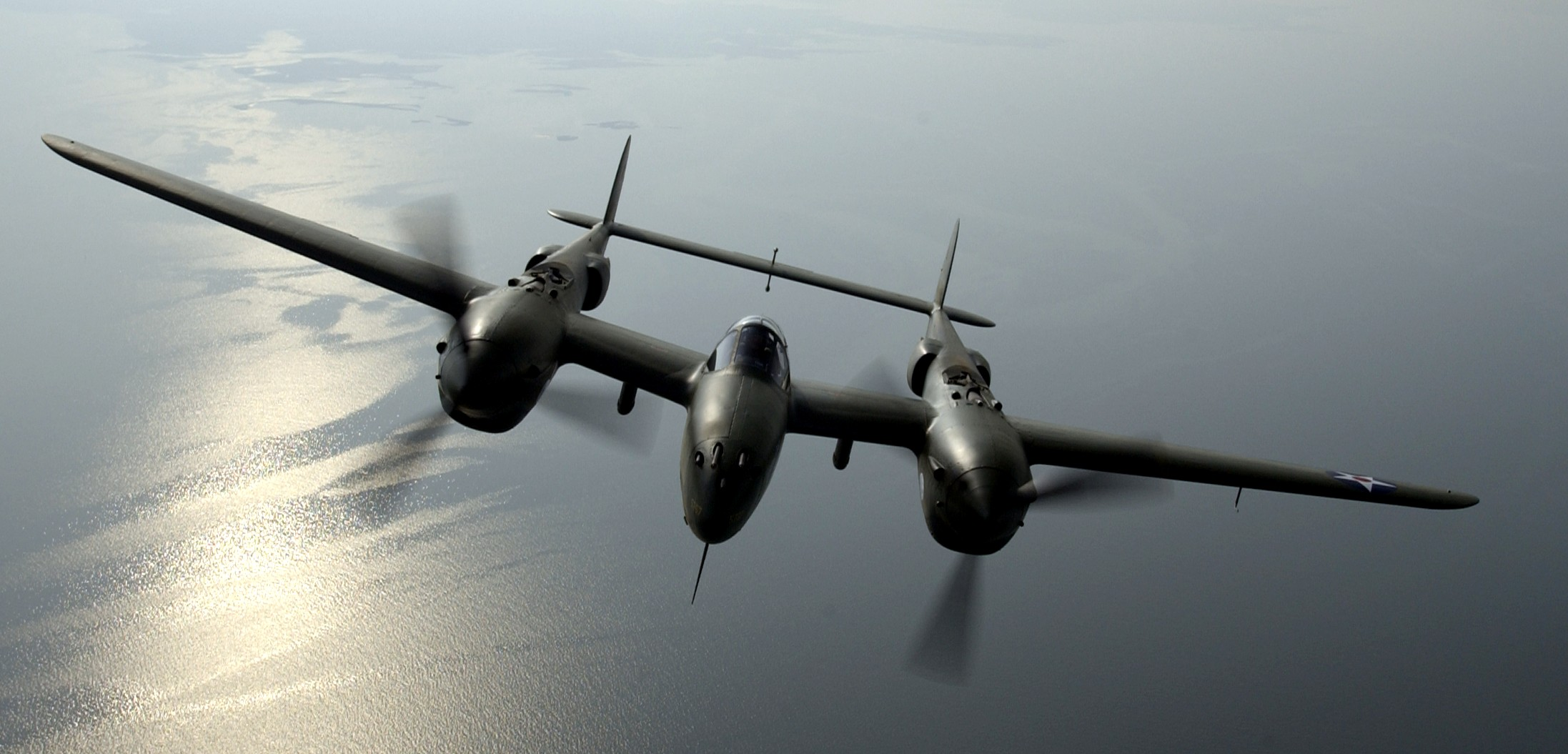
The restored Glacier Girl in flight

In April 2016, a team en route to the crash site in Greenland and under the guidance of veteran pilot and explorer, Ron Sheardown, was interviewed while at the airport in Saint-Hyacinthe, Quebec, Canada, regarding plans to recover a second P-38.

The team planned to extract another P-38 from the ice between May and August 2016. The glacier is drifting towards the sea, leaving most of the planes near or in a crevasse field too dangerous for a salvage mission.

Led by entrepreneurs Ken McBride and Jim Salazar, the group of a dozen Canadian and American explorers who have been working on the project since 2010 will attempt to extract the P-38 Echo, piloted by Capt. Robert Wilson and the second plane of the squadron to attempt landing, and donate it to a museum. Wilson's P-38 was the first to land wheels up after the first P-38, piloted by Brad McManus, flipped over when the front gear penetrated the ice on roll out and collapsed. The rest of the squadron successfully landed wheels up.

== 2018 mission ==
In July 2018, it was announced that Ken McBride and Jim Salazar had found a P-38 in the glacier, called Echo, and piloted by Lt. Robert Wilson. Excavation was scheduled for some point in 2019, with the team working with the United Kingdom, Greenland and the United States. As of May 2025, the P-38 "Echo" has not been recovered, but future expeditions and attempts at extraction are planned for the summer.

== 2024 display ==
The restored plane was temporarily put on display for the first time at the Lone Star Flight Museum at Ellington Airport in Houston, Texas, starting in December 2023, and ending in January 2024.

== See also ==
- Kee Bird, a Boeing B-29 Superfortress that made an emergency landing in northwest Greenland after running out of fuel
- My Gal Sal, a Boeing B-17 Flying Fortress which was forced to land on the Greenland icecap
