= Operation Sledgehammer =

Planned World War II military operation

Operation Sledgehammer was an Allied plan for a cross-Channel invasion of Europe during World War II, as the first step in helping to reduce pressure on the Soviet Red Army by establishing a Second Front. It was to be executed in 1942 and acted as a contingency alternative to Operation Roundup, the original Allied plan for the invasion of Europe in 1943. Allied forces were to seize the French Atlantic ports of either Brest or Cherbourg and areas of the Cotentin Peninsula during the early autumn of 1942, and amass troops for a breakout in the spring of 1943.

The operation was eagerly pressed for by both the United States military and the Soviet Union, but rejected by the British, who concluded a landing in France was premature, and hence impractical. As a result, Sledgehammer was never carried out, and instead the British proposal for an invasion of French North Africa took place in November 1942 under the code name Operation Torch.

== History ==
=== Background ===
After the United States entered World War II in December 1941, the U.S. Joint Chiefs of Staff pressed for an invasion of mainland Europe via the English Channel "as soon as possible". In March 1942, in a letter to British Prime Minister Winston Churchill, U.S. President Franklin Roosevelt wrote:

I am becoming more and more interested in the establishment of a new front this summer on the European continent, certainly for air and raids. From the point of view of shipping and supplies it is infinitely easier for us to participate in because of a maximum distance of about three thousand miles. And even though losses will doubtless be great, such losses will be compensated by at least equal German losses and by compelling the Germans to divert large forces of all kinds from the Russian front.

— Roosevelt to Churchill, 9 March 1942

On 8 April, General George C. Marshall and Harry Hopkins arrived in Britain to press the case for two possible American plans for a landing in occupied France, Operation Roundup and Operation Sledgehammer.

=== Operation Roundup plan ===
Roundup was the original Allied plan for the invasion of continental Europe. It was to be mounted before April 1943 and executed by 48 divisions, 18 of which would be British.

=== Operation Sledgehammer plan ===
Some American officials, including Marshall, encouraged the execution of a plan, later codenamed Operation Sledgehammer, to capture the French cities of Brest or Cherbourg in the latter half of 1942, as a staging ground for more extensive operations in 1943. Sledgehammer was also supported by some Soviet officials, including Foreign Minister Vyacheslav Molotov, who tried to convince both British and American officials, ultimately with little success.

Because American troops were not readily available, British troops would have been primarily responsible for the operation. British officials did not believe in the proposal's feasibility; some historians, including Robin Neillands, have considered the plan "little short of blackmail" and "lunacy", especially considering potential German resistance.

=== Course of events ===
British officials pressed for action in North Africa, which would allow relatively inexperienced American forces to gain experience in a less risky theatre and the gradual buildup of overwhelming force before Germany was engaged head on. At the Second Washington Conference in June 1942, Roosevelt and Churchill decided to postpone the cross-English Channel invasion until 1943 and make the first priority the opening a second front in North Africa. At the Second Claridge Conference in London, 20–26 July, Churchill and Roosevelt and Harry Hopkins agreed to substitute Operation Torch, the invasion of French North Africa, for US reinforcement of the Western Desert campaign.

Senior U.S. commanders expressed strong opposition to the landings and after the western Allied Combined Chiefs of Staff (CCS) met in London on 30 July, Marshall and Admiral Ernest King declined to approve the plan. Marshall and other U.S. generals continued to advocate Operation Sledgehammer, which the British rejected. After Churchill pressed for a landing in French North Africa in 1942, Marshall suggested instead to Roosevelt that the U.S. abandon the Germany first strategy and take the offensive in the Pacific. Roosevelt said it would do nothing to help Russia. With Marshall unable to persuade the British to change their minds, Roosevelt gave a direct order that Torch was to have precedence over other operations and was to take place at the earliest possible date, one of only two direct orders he gave to military commanders during the war. Torch met the British objective of securing victory in North Africa and the American objective to engage in the fight against Nazi Germany on a limited scale.

In the interim, a large-scale Canadian-led raid on the French coast was planned to take some of the pressure off the Soviet Union.

In November 1942 Eisenhower, now a lieutenant general, told Churchill that no major operation on the Continent could be carried out before 1944.

== See also ==
- Diplomatic history of World War II
- Operation Bolero
