= Skokie =

Skokie may refer to

- Skokie, Illinois, a village in Cook County, Illinois
  - National Socialist Party of America v. Village of Skokie
  - Skokie (film), a movie about the NSPA Controversy in Skokie
- Skokie (rocket), a parachute test rocket used by the U.S. Air Force
- Skokie Lagoons, a nature preserve in Cook County, Illinois
