= Cherokee (rocket) =

Experimental rocket

- Function: Experimental rocket
- Manufacturer: Cook Electric Co.
- Country of origin: United States

Size
- Height: 7.6 metres (25 ft)
- Diameter: 1,300 millimetres (51 in)
- Mass: 2,000 kilograms (4,500 lb)
- Stages: One

Launch history
- Status: Retired
- Launch sites: Edwards Air Force Base; Holloman Air Force Base
- Total launches: 4
- Partial failure(s): 4
- First flight: January 26, 1954
- Last flight: April 3, 1956

First stage
- Powered by: 1
- Maximum thrust: 222 kN (50,000 lb_{f})
- Burn time: 3 seconds
- Propellant: Solid

The Cherokee was an experimental rocket built by the Cook Electric Co. for use by the United States Air Force during the 1950s for the testing of ejection seats.

== History ==
Made from aluminum, Cherokee was a blocky, simple design that was designed for air-launch from a B-29 bomber. It was operated as part of Project Whoosh, an effort to determine if the use of ejection seats at supersonic speeds was feasible.

Launched from the B-29 mothership at an altitude of 6 miles (9.7 km) it would fire a solid-fueled rocket to accelerate to supersonic speed, at which point the ejection seat, containing an anesthetized chimpanzee as a test subject, would be fired. The first test took place on January 26, 1954, at Edwards Air Force Base; another test in June was held before the project moved to Holloman Air Force Base, with two further tests being carried out in July 1955 and April 1956. None of the four chimpanzees used in the tests survived due to difficulties with the ejection system, however the project was considered a partial success.
