= Boeing B-29 Superfortress =

US heavy bomber aircraft (1944–1960)

B-29 Superfortress
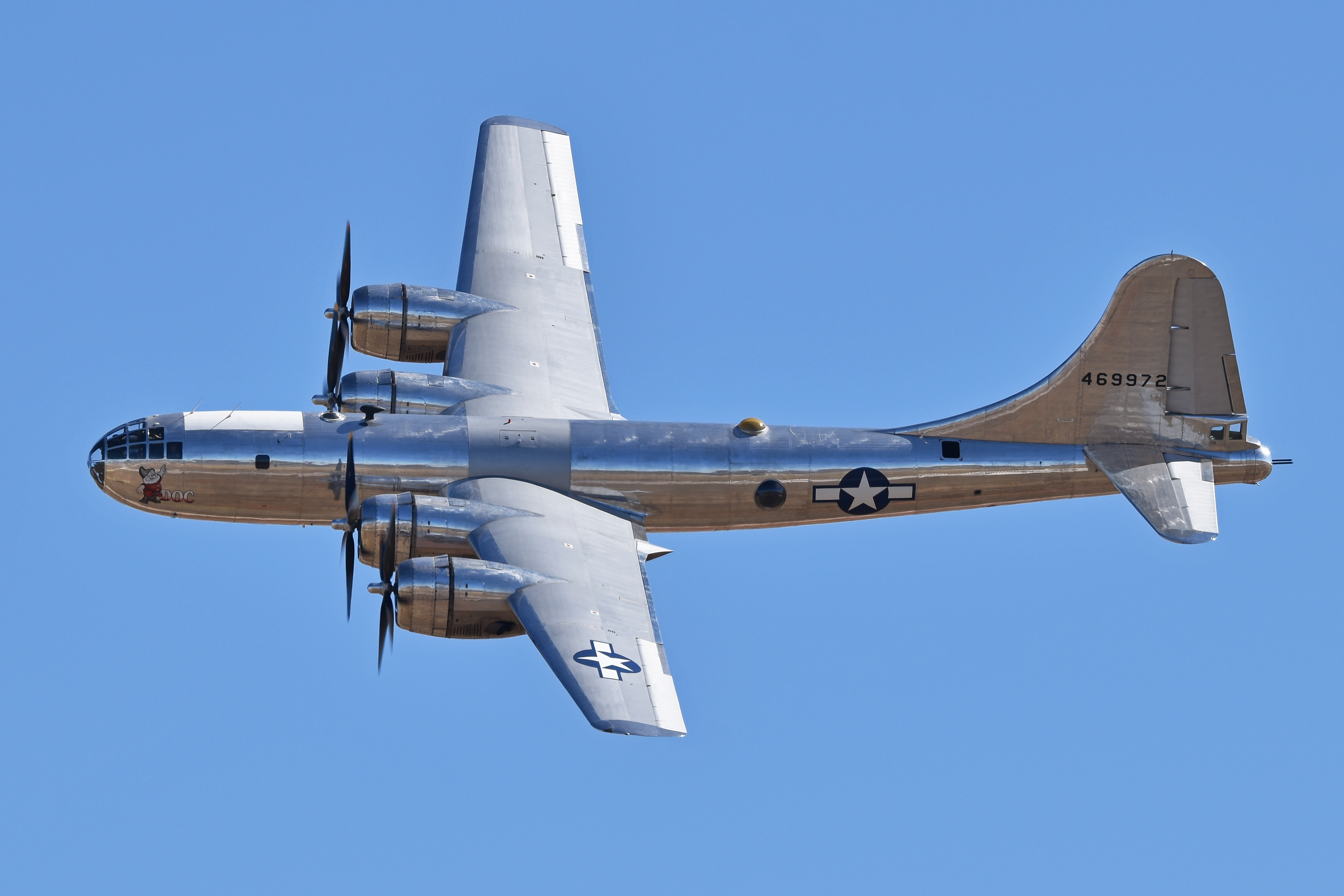
- Boeing B-29-70-BW Superfortress 469972 Doc – one of only two surviving airworthy models

General information
- Type: Strategic bomber, heavy bomber
- National origin: United States
- Manufacturer: Boeing
- Status: Retired from military use; two in service for airshows, rides and tours
- Primary users: United States Army Air Forces: United States Air Force; Royal Air Force
- Number built: 3,970

History
- Manufactured: 1943–1946
- Introduction date: 8 May 1944
- First flight: 21 September 1942
- Retired: 21 June 1960
- Variants: All models; Boeing KB-29 Superfortress; XB-39 Superfortress; Boeing XB-44 Superfortress; Tupolev Tu-4
- Developed into: Boeing C-97 Stratofreighter; Boeing 377 Stratocruiser; Boeing B-50 Superfortress

The Boeing B-29 Superfortress is a retired American four-engined propeller-driven heavy bomber, designed by Boeing and flown primarily by the USAAF and USAF during World War II and the Korean War. Named in allusion to its predecessor, the Boeing B-17 Flying Fortress, the Superfortress was designed for high-altitude strategic bombing, but also excelled in low-altitude night incendiary bombing and in dropping naval mines to blockade Japan. Silverplate B-29s dropped the atomic bombs on Hiroshima and Nagasaki, and remain the only system to deliver nuclear weapons in combat.

One of the largest aircraft of World War II, the B-29 was designed with state-of-the-art technology, which included a pressurized cabin, dual-wheeled tricycle landing gear, and an analog computer-controlled fire-control system that allowed one gunner and a fire-control officer to direct four remote machine gun turrets. The $3 billion cost of design and production (equivalent to $54 billion in 2025), far exceeding the $1.9 billion cost of the Manhattan Project, made the B-29 program the most expensive of the war. The B-29 remained in service in various roles throughout the 1950s, being retired in the early 1960s after 3,970 had been built. A few were also used as flying television transmitters by the Stratovision company. The Royal Air Force flew the B-29 with the service name Washington from 1950 to 1954, when the jet-powered Canberra entered service.

The B-29 was the progenitor of a series of Boeing-built bombers, transports, tankers, reconnaissance aircraft, and trainers. For example, the re-engined B-50 Superfortress Lucky Lady II became the first aircraft to fly around the world non-stop, during a 94-hour flight in 1949. The Boeing C-97 Stratofreighter airlifter, which was first flown in 1944, was followed in 1947 by its commercial airliner variant, the Boeing Model 377 Stratocruiser. In 1948, Boeing introduced the KB-29 tanker, followed in 1950 by the Model 377 derivative KC-97. A line of outsized-cargo variants of the Stratocruiser is the Guppy / Mini Guppy / Super Guppy, which remain in service with NASA and other operators. The Soviet Union produced 847 Tupolev Tu-4s, an unlicensed reverse-engineered copy of the B-29. Twenty-two B-29s have survived to preservation. The majority are on static display at museums, while two airframes – FIFI and Doc – still fly.

== Design and development ==
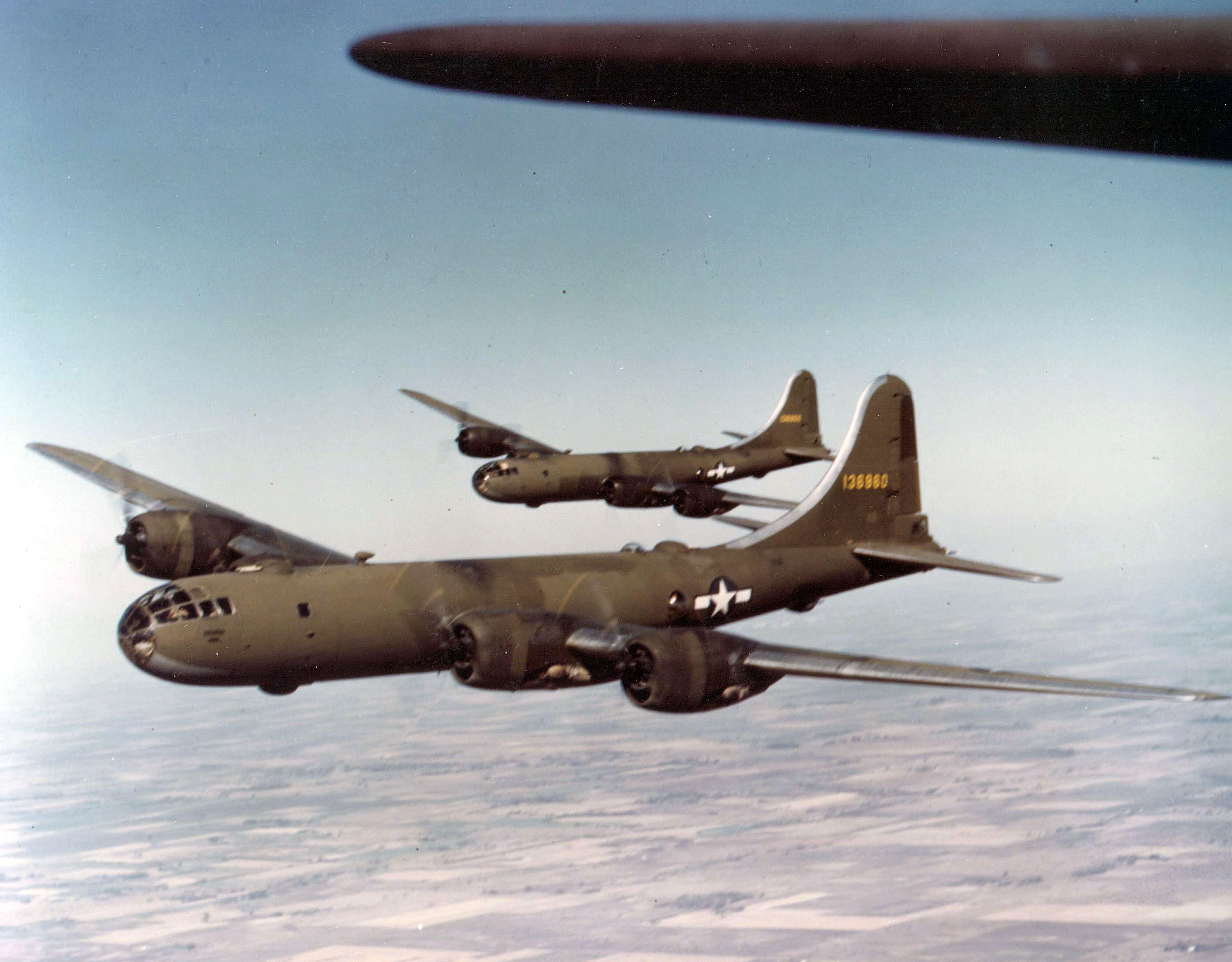
YB-29 Superfortresses in flight

Boeing began work on long-range bombers in 1938. Boeing's design study for the Model 334 was a pressurized derivative of the Boeing B-17 Flying Fortress with nosewheel undercarriage. Although the Air Corps lacked funds to pursue the design, Boeing continued development with its own funds as a private venture. In December 1939, the Air Corps issued a formal specification for a so-called "superbomber" that could deliver 20,000 lb (9,100 kg) of bombs to a target 2,667 mi (4,292 km) away, and at a speed of 400 mph (640 km/h). Boeing's previous private venture studies formed the starting point for its response to the Air Corps formal specification.

On 29 January 1940, the United States Army Air Corps issued a request to five major aircraft manufacturers to submit designs for a four-engine bomber with a range of 2,000 miles (3,200 km). Boeing submitted its Model 345 on 11 May 1940, in competition with designs from Consolidated Aircraft (the Model 33, which later became the B-32), Lockheed (the Lockheed XB-30), and Douglas (the Douglas XB-31).

Douglas and Lockheed soon abandoned work on their projects, but Boeing received an order on 24 August 1940 for two flying prototypes, which were given the designation XB-29, and an airframe for static testing. The order was revised to add a third flying aircraft on 14 December. Consolidated continued to work on its Model 33, as it was seen by the Air Corps as a backup if there were problems with Boeing's design. These designs were evaluated, and on 6 September orders were placed for two experimental models each from Boeing and Consolidated, which became the Boeing B-29 Superfortress and the Consolidated B-32 Dominator. These were known as very long range (VLR) bombers; the name "Superfortress" was not assigned until March 1944. On 17 May 1941, Boeing received an initial production order for 14 service test aircraft and 250 production bombers; this being increased to 500 aircraft in January 1942.

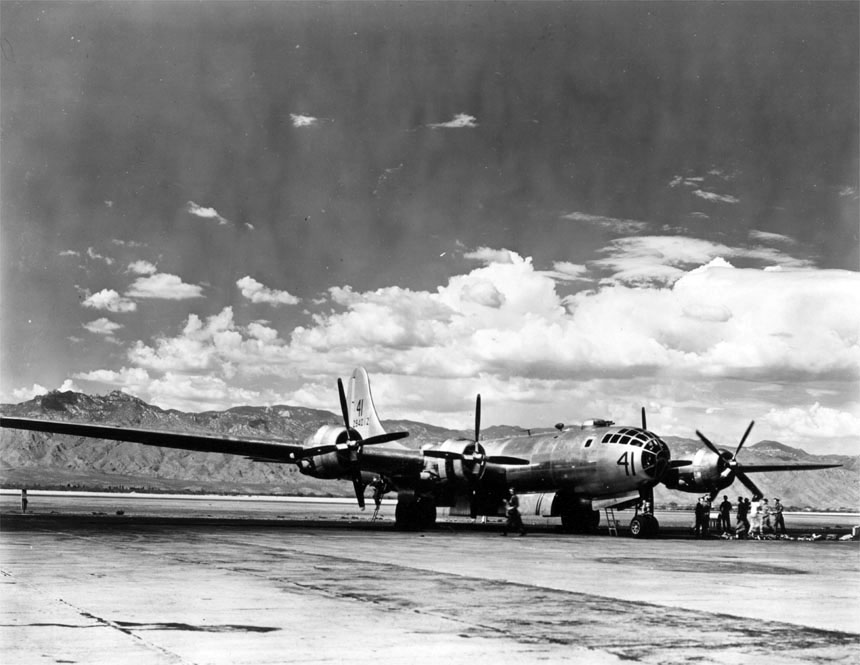
The length of the 141-foot (43 m) wing span of a Boeing B-29 Superfortress based at Davis-Monthan Field is vividly illustrated here with the cloud-topped Santa Catalina Mountains as a contrasting background.

Manufacturing the B-29 was a complex task that involved four main-assembly factories. There were two Boeing operated plants at Renton, Washington (Boeing Renton Factory), and one in Wichita, Kansas, a Bell plant at Marietta, Georgia, near Atlanta ("Bell-Atlanta"), and a Martin plant at Bellevue, Nebraska ("Martin-Omaha" – Offutt Field). Thousands of subcontractors were also involved in the project. The first prototype made its maiden flight from Boeing Field, Seattle, on 21 September 1942. The combined effects of the aircraft's highly advanced design, challenging requirements, immense pressure for production, and hurried development caused setbacks. Unlike the unarmed first prototype, the second was fitted with a Sperry defensive armament system using remote-controlled gun turrets sighted by periscopes. It first flew on 30 December 1942, although the flight was terminated due to a serious engine fire.

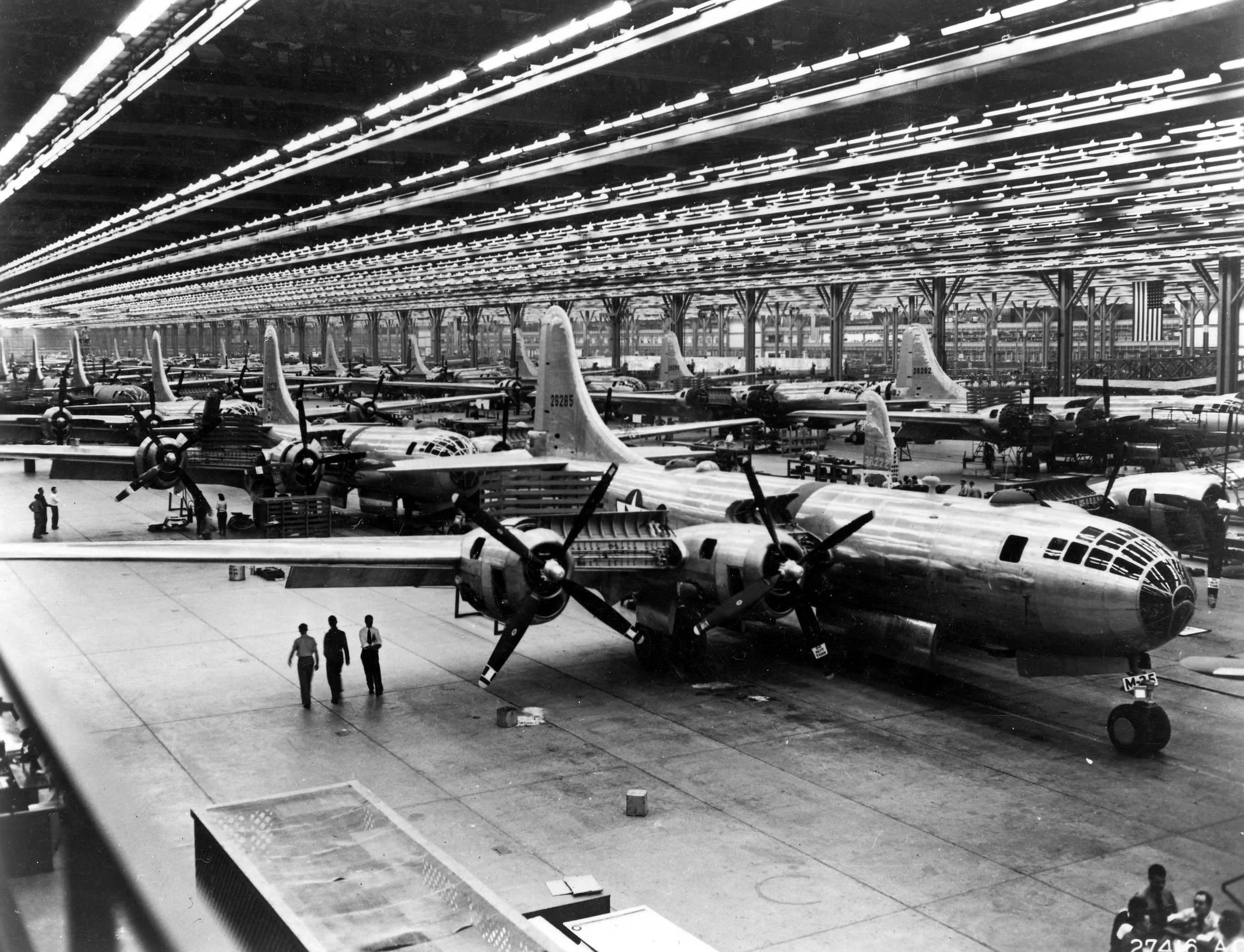
Boeing assembly line at Wichita, Kansas (1944)

On 18 February 1943, the second prototype, flying out of Boeing Field in Seattle, experienced an engine fire and crashed. The crash killed Boeing test pilot Edmund T. Allen and his 10-man crew, 20 workers at the Frye Meat Packing Plant, and a Seattle firefighter. Changes to the production craft came so often and so fast that, in early 1944, B-29s flew from the production lines directly to modification depots for extensive rebuilds to incorporate the latest changes. AAF-contracted modification centers and its own air depot system struggled to handle the scope of the requirements. Some facilities lacked hangars capable of housing the giant B-29, requiring outdoor work in freezing weather, further delaying necessary modification. By the end of 1943, although almost 100 aircraft had been delivered, only 15 were airworthy. This prompted an intervention by General Hap Arnold to resolve the problem, with production personnel being sent from the factories to the modification centers to speed availability of sufficient aircraft to equip the first bomb groups in what became known as the "Battle of Kansas". This resulted in 150 aircraft being modified in five weeks, between 10 March and 15 April 1944.

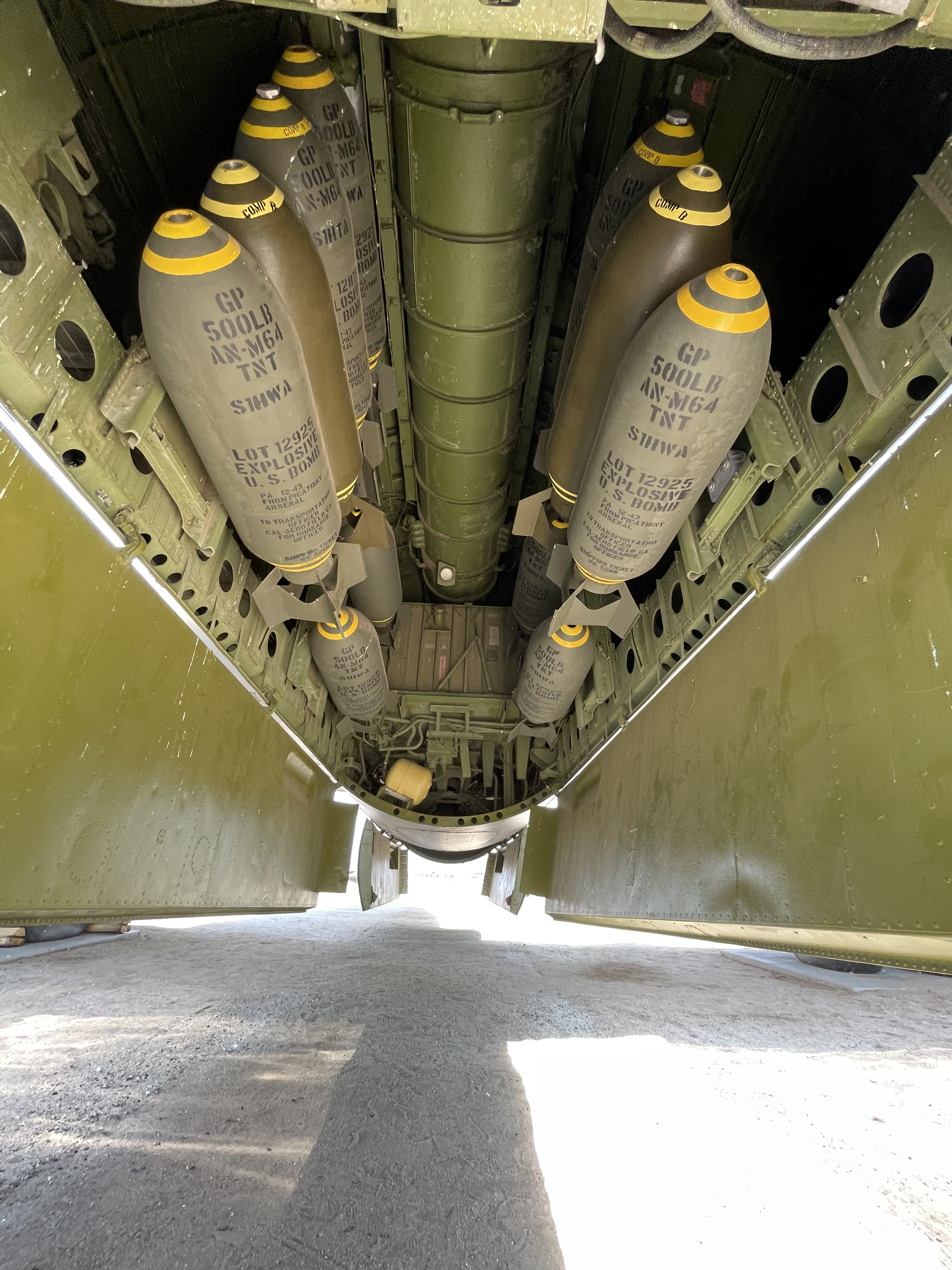
B-29 Weapons Bay with General-Purpose AN-M64 TNT 500 LB bombs

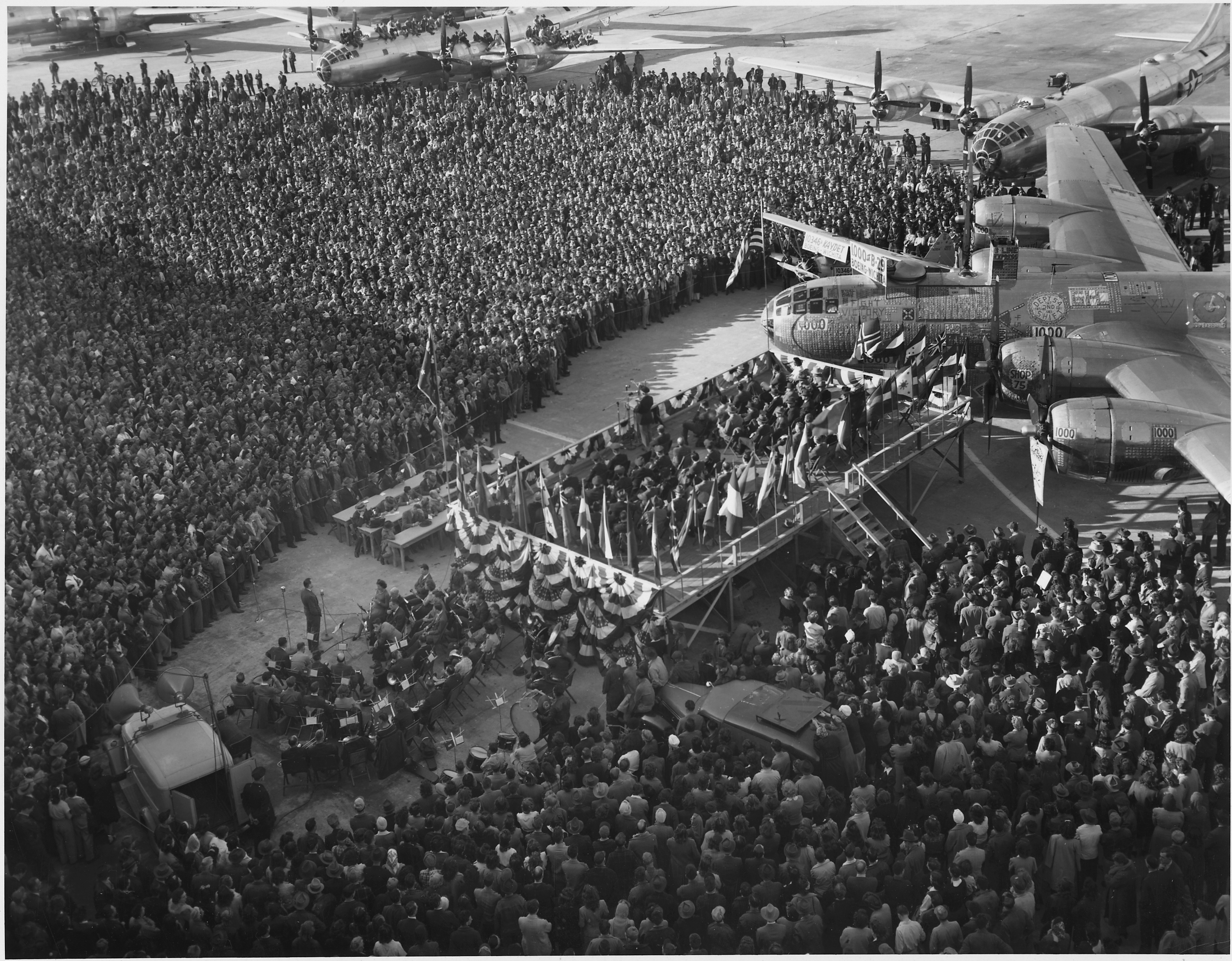
1000th B-29 delivery ceremony at the Boeing Wichita plant in February 1945

The most common cause of maintenance headaches and catastrophic failures was the engines. Although the Wright R-3350 Duplex-Cyclone radial engines later became a trustworthy workhorse in large piston-engined aircraft, early models were beset with dangerous reliability problems. This problem was not fully cured until the aircraft was fitted with the more powerful Pratt & Whitney R-4360 "Wasp Major" in the B-29D/B-50 program, which arrived too late for World War II. Interim measures included cuffs placed on propeller blades to divert a greater flow of cooling air into the intakes, which had baffles installed to direct a stream of air onto the exhaust valves. Oil flow to the valves was also increased, asbestos baffles were installed around rubber push rod fittings to prevent oil loss, thorough pre-flight inspections were made to detect unseated valves, and mechanics frequently replaced the uppermost five cylinders (every 25 hours of engine time) and the entire engines (every 75 hours). (Note: As efforts were made to eradicate the problems a succession of engine models were fitted to B-29s. B-29 production started with the −23, which were all modified to the "war engine" −23A. Other versions were −41 (B-29A), −57, −59.)

During development, the high-altitude performance of the B-29's Wright R-3350 engines was severely limited by turbine blade failures inside their dual General Electric turbosuperchargers, where exhaust gases exceeded 1,500 °F (815 °C). To survive these extreme temperatures without warping or undergoing thermal creep, GE aviation pioneer Dr. Sanford Moss introduced Vitallium (later designated Haynes Stellite 21), a high-strength cobalt-chromium-molybdenum superalloy. Originally developed in 1932 by Austenal Laboratories as a lightweight, biocompatible, and corrosion-resistant material for dental dentures and orthopedic implants, Vitallium possessed the precise high-temperature metallurgical stability required for aviation. Utilizing the same "lost-wax" precision investment casting technique employed by the dental industry, GE was able to mass-produce the alloy into highly durable turbine "bucket wheels." This cross-industry metallurgical innovation provided the B-29 with reliable high-altitude turbocharging capabilities, giving the United States a critical strategic advantage over Axis powers, who lacked access to the strategic cobalt and chromium reserves needed to manufacture comparable high-temperature alloys.

Pilots, including the present-day pilots of the Commemorative Air Force's Fifi, one of the last two remaining flying B-29s, describe flight after takeoff as being an urgent struggle for airspeed (generally, flight after takeoff should consist of striving for altitude). Radial engines need airflow to keep them cool, and failure to get up to speed as soon as possible could result in an engine failure and risk of fire. One useful technique was to check the magnetos while already on takeoff roll rather than during a conventional static engine-runup before takeoff.

The $3 billion cost of design and production (equivalent to $54 billion in 2022), far exceeding the $1.9 billion cost of the Manhattan Project, made the B-29 program the most expensive of the war. The unit cost was $639,188 ($11.4 million in 2025), and the prototype cost was $3,392,396.60 ($60.7 million in 2025).

== Features ==
=== Defensive gun turret emplacements ===
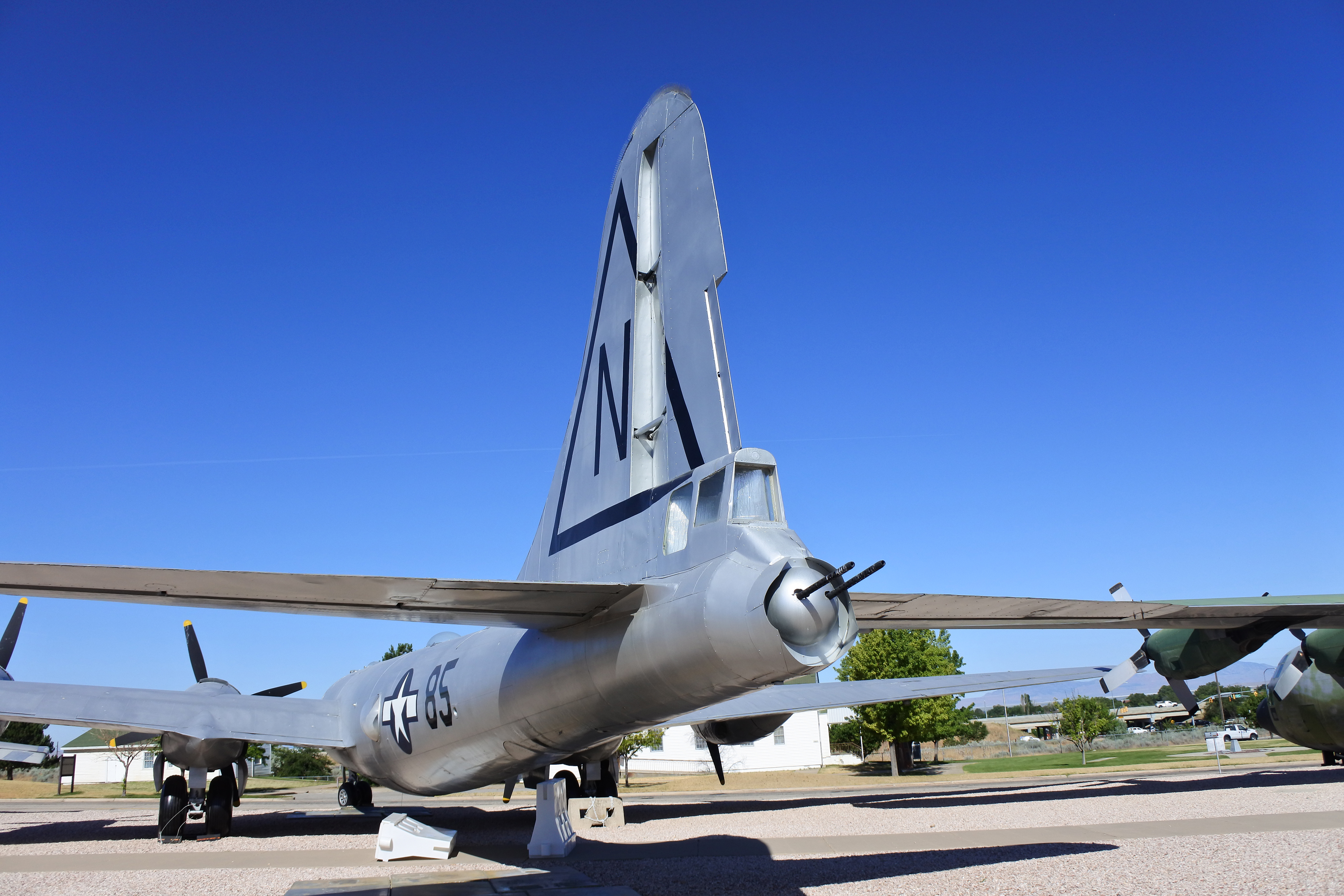
Tail armament, B-29 Superfortress, Hill Aerospace Museum

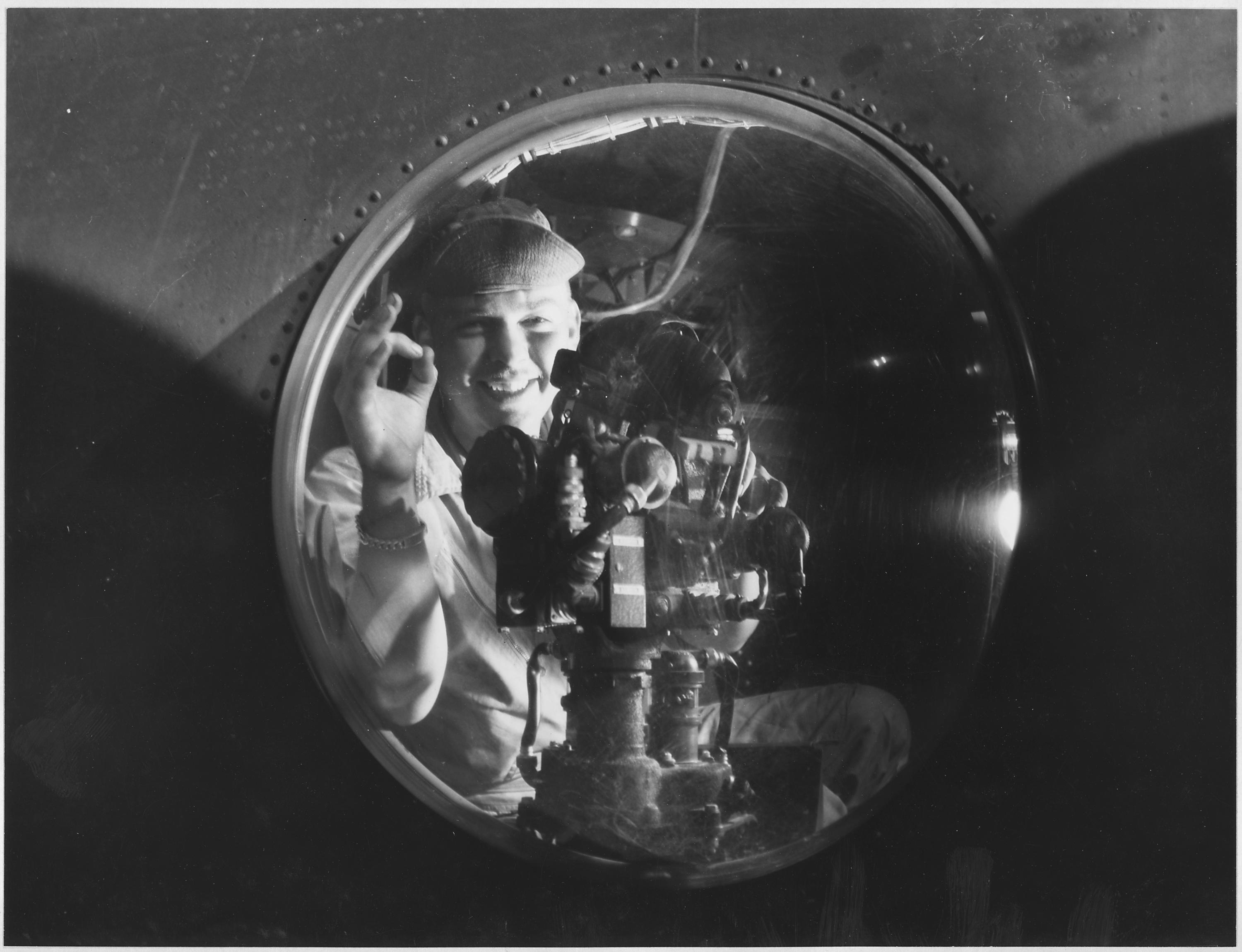
Gunner sighting station blister

In wartime, the B-29 was capable of flight at altitudes up to 31,850 feet (9,710 m), at speeds of up to 350 mph (560 km/h; 300 kn) (true airspeed). This was its best defense because Japanese fighters could barely reach that altitude, and few could catch the B-29 even if they did attain that altitude.

The General Electric Central Fire Control system on the B-29 directed four remotely controlled turrets armed with two .50 Browning M2 machine guns each. (Note: The forward upper turret's armament was later doubled to four .50 Brownings.) All weapons were aimed optically, with targeting computed by analog electrical instrumentation. There were five interconnected sighting stations located in the nose and tail positions and three Plexiglas blisters in the central fuselage. (Note: The nose sighting station was operated by the bombardier) Five General Electric analog computers (one dedicated to each sight) increased the weapons' accuracy by compensating for factors such as airspeed, lead, gravity, temperature and humidity. The computers also allowed a single gunner to operate two or more turrets (including tail guns) simultaneously.

The gunner in the upper position acted as fire control officer, managing the distribution of turrets among the other gunners during combat. The tail position initially had two .50 Browning machine guns and a single M2 20 mm cannon, and had the ability to override control of the two rear turrets if a target exceeded the maximum angle of the tail weaponry. If the tail gunner or nose gunner are not using the forward or tail weaponry, control is automatically transferred to the waist gunners, who have full 360 degree targeting ability, but limited to 60 degrees of vertical targeting movement. Later aircraft had the 20 mm cannon removed, sometimes replaced by a third machine gun.

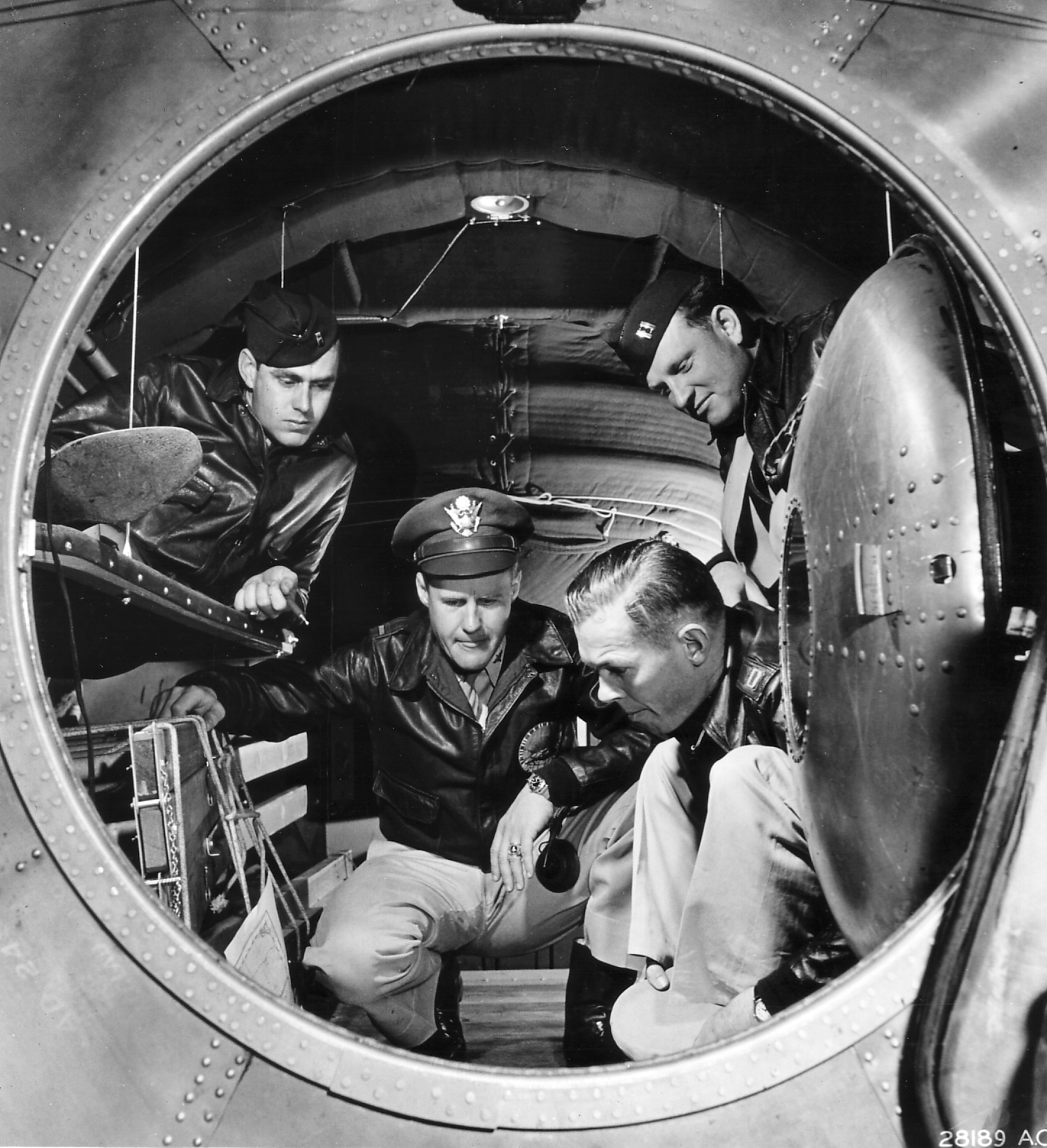
Interior photo of the rear pressurized cabin of the B-29 Superfortress, June 1944

Gunnery in the B-29 (1945) – official de-classified USAAF remote turret fire-control training film reel

In early 1945, Major General Curtis LeMay, commander of XXI Bomber Command—the Marianas-based B-29-equipped bombing force—ordered most of the defensive armament and remote-controlled sighting equipment removed from the B-29s under his command. The affected aircraft had the same reduced defensive firepower as the nuclear weapons-delivery intended Silverplate B-29 airframes and could carry greater fuel and bomb loads as a result of the change. The lighter defensive armament was made possible by a change in mission from high-altitude, daylight bombing with high explosive bombs to low-altitude night raids using incendiary bombs. As a consequence of that requirement, Bell Atlanta (BA) produced a series of 311 B-29Bs that had turrets and sighting equipment omitted, except for the tail position, which was fitted with AN/APG-15 fire-control radar. That version could also have an improved APQ-7 "Eagle" bombing-through-overcast radar fitted in an airfoil-shaped radome under the fuselage. Most of those aircraft were assigned to the 315th Bomb Wing, Northwest Field, Guam.

=== Pressurization ===
The crew would enjoy, for the first time in a bomber, full-pressurization comfort. This first-ever cabin pressure system for an Allied production bomber was developed for the B-29 by Garrett AiResearch. (Note: Boeing had previously built the 307 Stratoliner, which was the first commercial airliner with a fully pressurized cabin. Only 10 of these aircraft were built. While other aircraft such as the Ju 86P were pressurized, the B-29 was designed from the outset with a pressurized system.) Both the forward and rear crew compartments were to be pressurized, but the designers had to decide whether to have bomb bays that were not pressurized or a fully pressurized fuselage that would have to be de-pressurized prior to opening the bomb bay doors. The solution was to have bomb bays that were not pressurized and a long tunnel joining the forward and rear crew compartments. Crews could use the tunnel if necessary to crawl from one pressurized compartment to the other.

== Operational history ==
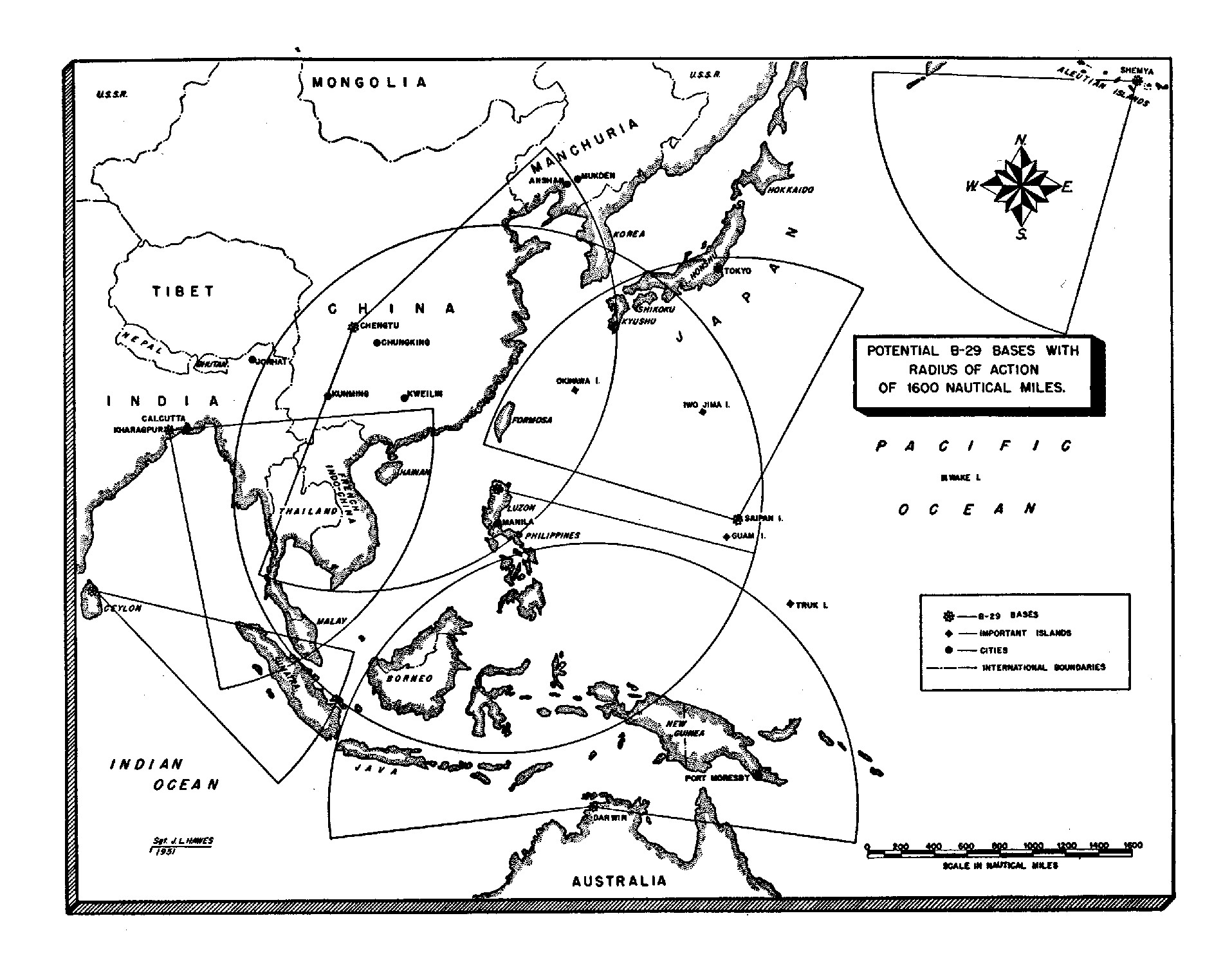
Radius of operations for B-29 bases

=== World War II ===
In September 1941, the United States Army Air Forces' (AAF) plans for war against Germany and Japan proposed basing the B-29 in Egypt for operations against Germany, as British airbases were likely to be overcrowded. Air Force planning throughout 1942 and early 1943 continued to have the B-29 deployed initially against Germany, transferring to the Pacific only after the end of the war in Europe. By the end of 1943, plans had changed, partly due to production delays, and the B-29 was dedicated to the Pacific Theater. A new plan implemented at the direction of President Franklin D. Roosevelt as a promise to China, called Operation Matterhorn, deployed the B-29 units to attack Japan from four forward bases in southern China, with five main bases in India, and to attack other targets in the region from China and India as needed. The Chengdu region was eventually chosen over the Guilin region to avoid having to raise, equip, and train 50 Chinese divisions to protect the advanced bases from Japanese ground attack. The XX Bomber Command, initially intended to be two combat wings of four groups each, was reduced to a single wing of four groups because of the lack of availability of aircraft, automatically limiting the effectiveness of any attacks from China.

This was an extremely costly scheme, as there was no overland connection available between India and China, and all supplies had to be flown over the Himalayas, either by transport aircraft or by B-29s themselves, with some aircraft being stripped of armor and guns and used to deliver fuel. B-29s started to arrive in India in early April 1944. The first B-29 flight to airfields in China (over the Himalayas, or "The Hump") took place on 24 April 1944. The first B-29 combat mission was flown on 5 June 1944, with 77 out of 98 B-29s launched from India bombing the railroad shops in Bangkok and elsewhere in Thailand. Five B-29s were lost during the mission, none to hostile fire.

==== Forward base in China ====
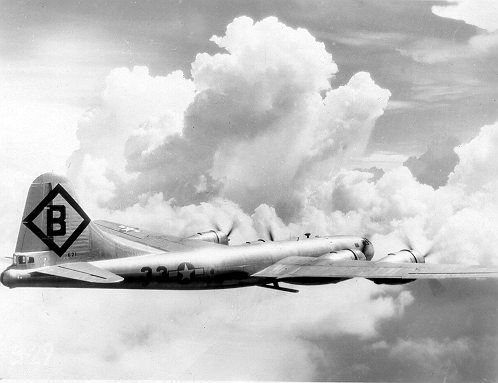
B-29 of the 16th Bombardment Group during World War II in 1944

On 5 June 1944, B-29s raided Bangkok, in what is reported as a test before being deployed against the Japanese home islands. Sources do not report from where they launched and vary as to the numbers involved—77, 98, and 114 being claimed. Targets were Bangkok's Memorial Bridge and a major power plant. Bombs fell over 1.2 miles (2 km) away, damaged no civilian structures, but destroyed some tram lines, and destroyed both a Japanese military hospital and the Japanese secret police headquarters. On 15 June 1944, 68 B-29s took off from bases around Chengdu, 47 B-29s bombed the Imperial Iron and Steel Works at Yawata, Fukuoka Prefecture, Japan. This was the first attack on Japanese islands since the Doolittle Raid in April 1942. The first B-29 combat losses occurred during this raid, with one B-29 destroyed on the ground by Japanese fighters after an emergency landing in China, one lost to anti-aircraft fire over Yawata, and another, the Stockett's Rocket (after Capt. Marvin M. Stockett, aircraft commander) B-29-1-BW 42-6261, (Note: The suffix −1-BW indicates that this B-29 was from the first production batch of B-29s manufactured at the Boeing, Wichita plant. Other suffixes are BA = Bell, Atlanta; BN = Boeing, Renton, Washington; MO = Martin, Omaha, Nebraska.) disappeared after takeoff from Chakulia, India, over the Himalayas (12 KIA, 11 crew and 1 passenger). This raid, which did little damage to the target, with only one bomb striking the target factory complex, nearly exhausted fuel stocks at the Chengdu B-29 bases, resulting in a slow-down of operations until the fuel stockpiles could be replenished. Starting in July, the raids against Japan from Chinese airfields continued at relatively low intensity. Japan was bombed on:

- 7 July 1944 (14 B-29s)
- 29 July (>70)
- 10 August (24)
- 20 August (61)
- 8 September (90)
- 26 September (83)
- 25 October (59)
- 12 November (29)
- 21 November (61)
- 19 December (36)
- 6 January 1945 (49)

B-29s were withdrawn from airfields in China by the end of January 1945. Throughout the prior period, B-29 raids were also launched from China and India against many other targets throughout Southeast Asia, including a series of raids on Singapore and Thailand. On 2 November 1944, 55 B-29s raided Bangkok's Bang Sue marshaling yards. Seven RTAF Nakajima Ki-43 Hayabusas from Foong Bin (Air Group) 16 and 14 IJAAF Ki-43s attempted to intercept. RTAF Flt Lt Therdsak Worrasap attacked a B-29, damaging it, but was shot down by return fire. One B-29 was lost, possibly the one damaged by Flt Lt Therdsak. (Note: The biggest raid on Bangkok during the war occurred on 2 November 1944, when the marshaling yards at Bang Sue were raided by 55 B-29s ...) On 14 April 1945, a second B-29 raid on Bangkok destroyed two key power plants and was the last major attack conducted against Thai targets. The B-29 effort was gradually shifted to the new bases in the Mariana Islands in the Central Pacific, with the last B-29 combat mission from India flown on 29 March 1945.

==== New Mariana Islands air bases ====
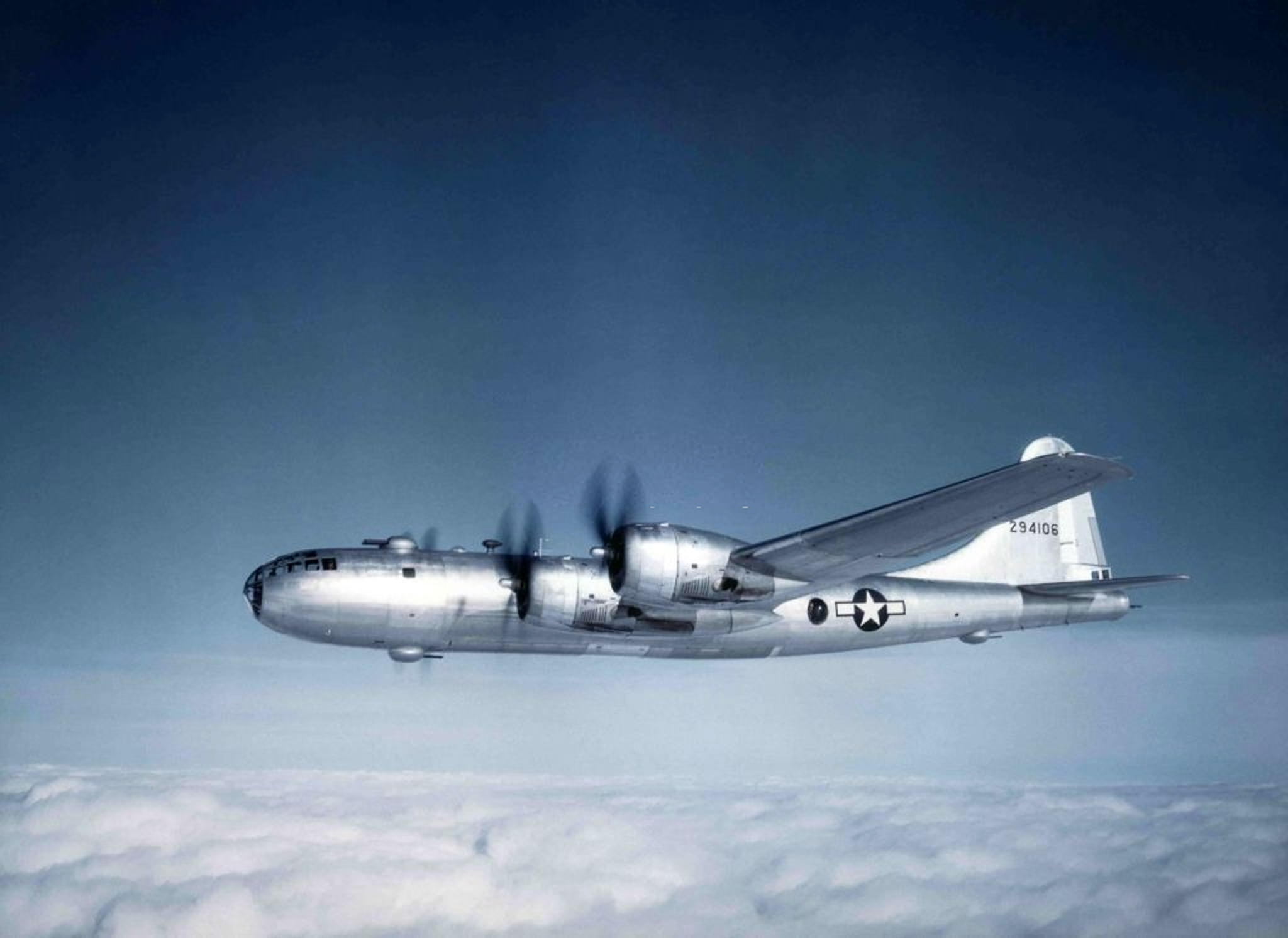
B-29A-30-BN, 42-94106, on a long-range mission

In addition to the logistical problems associated with operations from China, the B-29 could reach only a limited part of Japan while flying from Chinese bases. The solution to this problem was to capture the Mariana Islands, which would bring targets such as Tokyo, about 1,500 mi (2,400 km) north of the Marianas within range of B-29 attacks. The Joint Chiefs of Staff agreed in December 1943 to seize the Marianas.

US forces invaded Saipan on 15 June 1944. Despite a Japanese naval counterattack which led to the Battle of the Philippine Sea and heavy fighting on land, Saipan was secured by 9 July. Operations followed against Guam and Tinian, with all three islands secured by August. Naval construction battalions (Seabees) began at once to construct air bases suitable for the B-29, commencing even before the end of ground fighting. In all, five major airfields were built: two on the flat island of Tinian, one on Saipan, and two on Guam. Each was large enough to eventually accommodate a bomb wing consisting of four bomb groups, giving a total of 180 B-29s per airfield. These bases could be supplied by ship and, unlike the bases in China, were not vulnerable to attack by Japanese ground forces.

"B-29 Flight Procedure And Combat Crew Functioning" (1944) – official USAAF de-classified training reel

The bases became the launch sites for the large B-29 raids against Japan in the final year of the war. The first B-29 arrived on Saipan on 12 October 1944, and the first combat mission was launched from there on 28 October 1944, with 14 B-29s attacking the Truk atoll. The 73rd Bomb Wing launched the first mission against Japan from bases in the Marianas, on 24 November 1944, sending 111 B-29s to attack Tokyo. For this first attack on the Japanese capital since the Doolittle Raid in April 1942, 73rd Bomb Wing wing commander Brigadier General Emmett O'Donnell Jr. acted as mission command pilot in B-29 Dauntless Dotty.

The campaign of incendiary raids started with the bombardment of Kobe on 4 February 1945, then peaked early with the most destructive bombing raid in history (even when the later Silverplate-flown nuclear attacks on Hiroshima and Nagasaki are considered) on the night of 9–10 March 1945 on Tokyo. From then on, the raids intensified, being launched regularly until the end of the war. The attacks succeeded in devastating most large Japanese cities (with the exception of Kyoto and four that were reserved for nuclear attacks), and gravely damaged Japan's war industries. Although less publicly appreciated, the mining of Japanese ports and shipping routes (Operation Starvation) carried out by B-29s from April 1945 reduced Japan's ability to support its population and move its troops.

==== Nuclear weapons ====
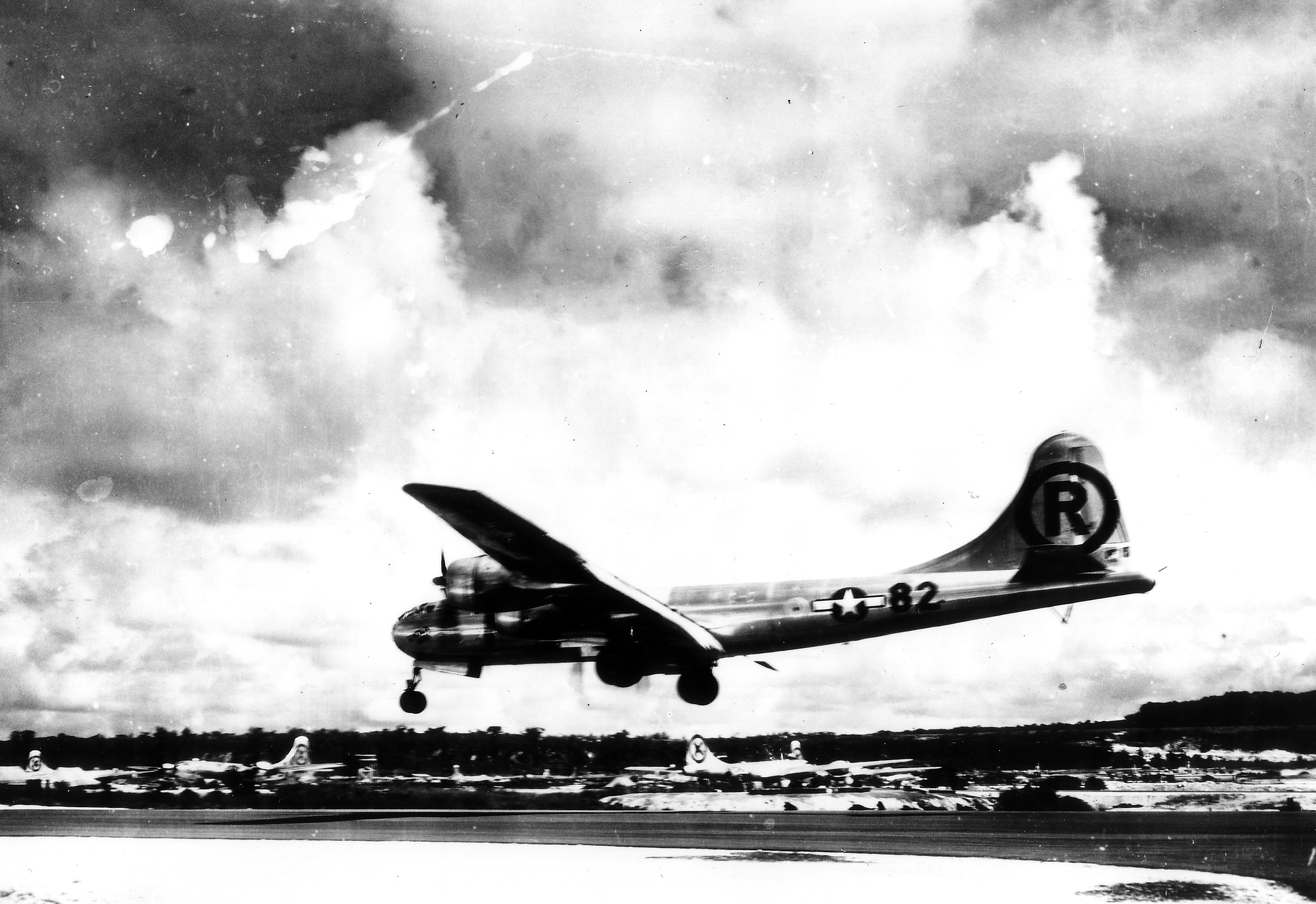
Enola Gay, a Silverplate version of the Boeing B-29 Superfortress landing after delivering Little Boy over Hiroshima

The most famous B-29s were the Silverplate series, being extensively modified to carry nuclear weapons. Early consideration was given to using the British Lancaster as a nuclear bomber, as this would require less modification. However, the superior range and high-altitude performance of the B-29 made it a much better choice, and after the B-29 began to be modified in November 1943 for carrying the atomic bomb, the suggestion for using the Lancaster never came up again.

The most significant modification was the enlargement of the bomb bay enabling each aircraft to carry either the Little Boy or Fat Man weapons. These Silverplate bombers differed from other B-29s then in service by having fuel injection and reversible props. Also, to make a lighter aircraft, the Silverplate B-29s were stripped of all guns, except for those on the tail. Pilot Charles Sweeney credits the reversible props for saving Bockscar after making an emergency landing on Okinawa following the Nagasaki bombing.

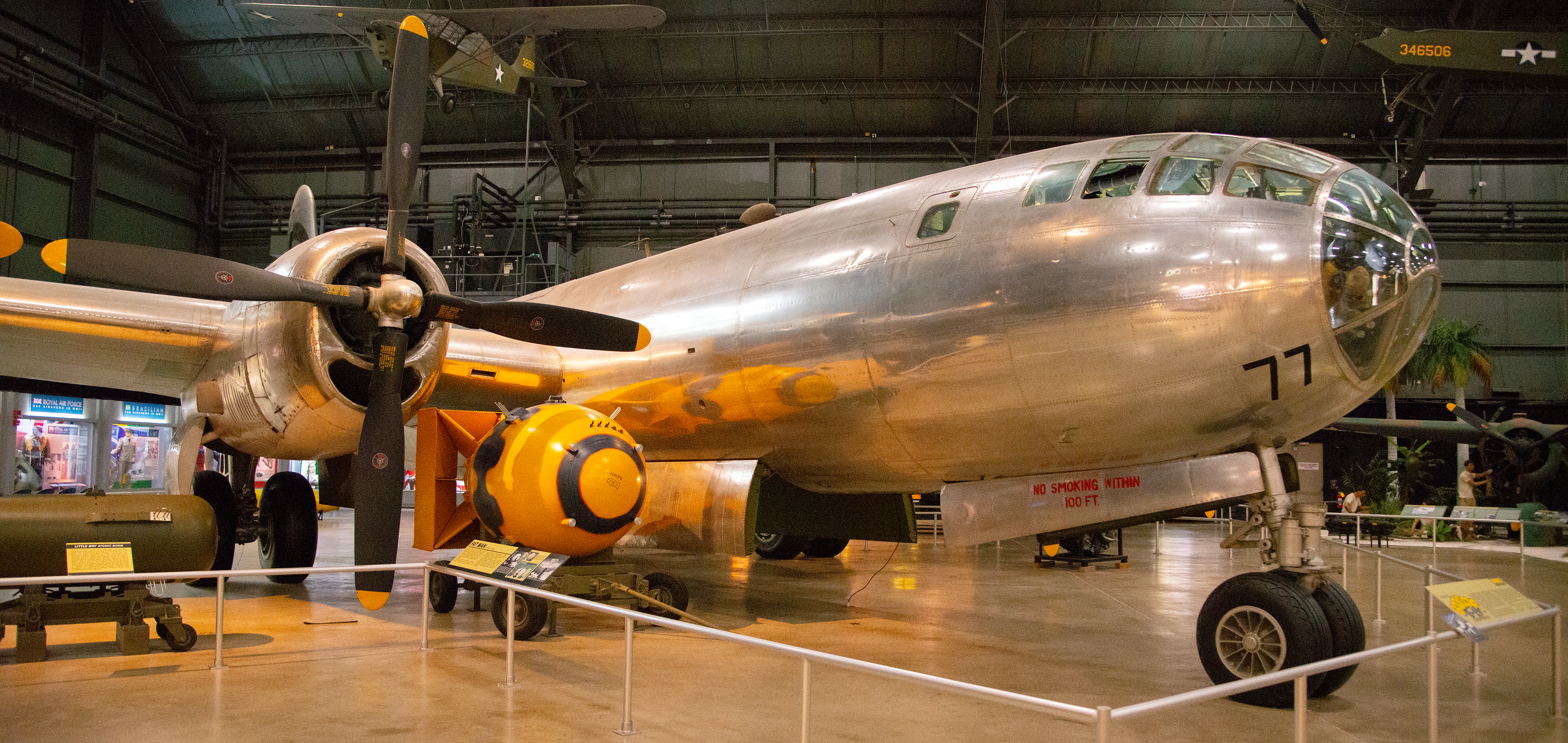
Bockscar and a post-war Mk III nuclear weapon painted to resemble the Fat Man bomb

Enola Gay, flown by Colonel Paul Tibbets, dropped the first bomb, called Little Boy, on Hiroshima on 6 August 1945. Enola Gay is fully restored and on display at the Smithsonian's Steven F. Udvar-Hazy Center, outside Dulles Airport near Washington, D.C. Bockscar, piloted by Major Charles W. Sweeney, dropped the second bomb, called Fat Man, on Nagasaki three days later. Bockscar is on display at the National Museum of the United States Air Force.

Following the surrender of Japan, called V-J Day, B-29s were used for other purposes. A number supplied POWs with food and other necessities by dropping barrels of rations on Japanese POW camps. In September 1945, a long-distance flight was undertaken for public relations purposes: Generals Barney M. Giles, Curtis LeMay, and Emmett O'Donnell Jr. piloted three specially modified B-29s from Chitose Air Base in Hokkaidō to Chicago Municipal Airport, continuing to Washington, D.C., the farthest nonstop distance (6,400 miles or 10,300 kilometers) to that date flown by US Army Air Forces aircraft and the first-ever nonstop flight from Japan to Chicago. (Note: "The straight line distance between Chitose Japanese Air Self Defense Force and Chicago, Chicago Midway Airport is approximately 5,839 miles or 9,397 kilometres.") Two months later, Colonel Clarence S. Irvine commanded another modified B-29, Pacusan Dreamboat, in a world-record-breaking long-distance flight from Guam to Washington, D.C., traveling 7,916 miles (12,740 km) in 35 hours, with a gross takeoff weight of 155,000 pounds (70,000 kg). Almost a year later, in October 1946, the same B-29 flew 9,422 miles (15,163 km) nonstop from Oahu, Hawaii, to Cairo, Egypt, in less than 40 hours, demonstrating the possibility of routing airlines over the polar ice cap.

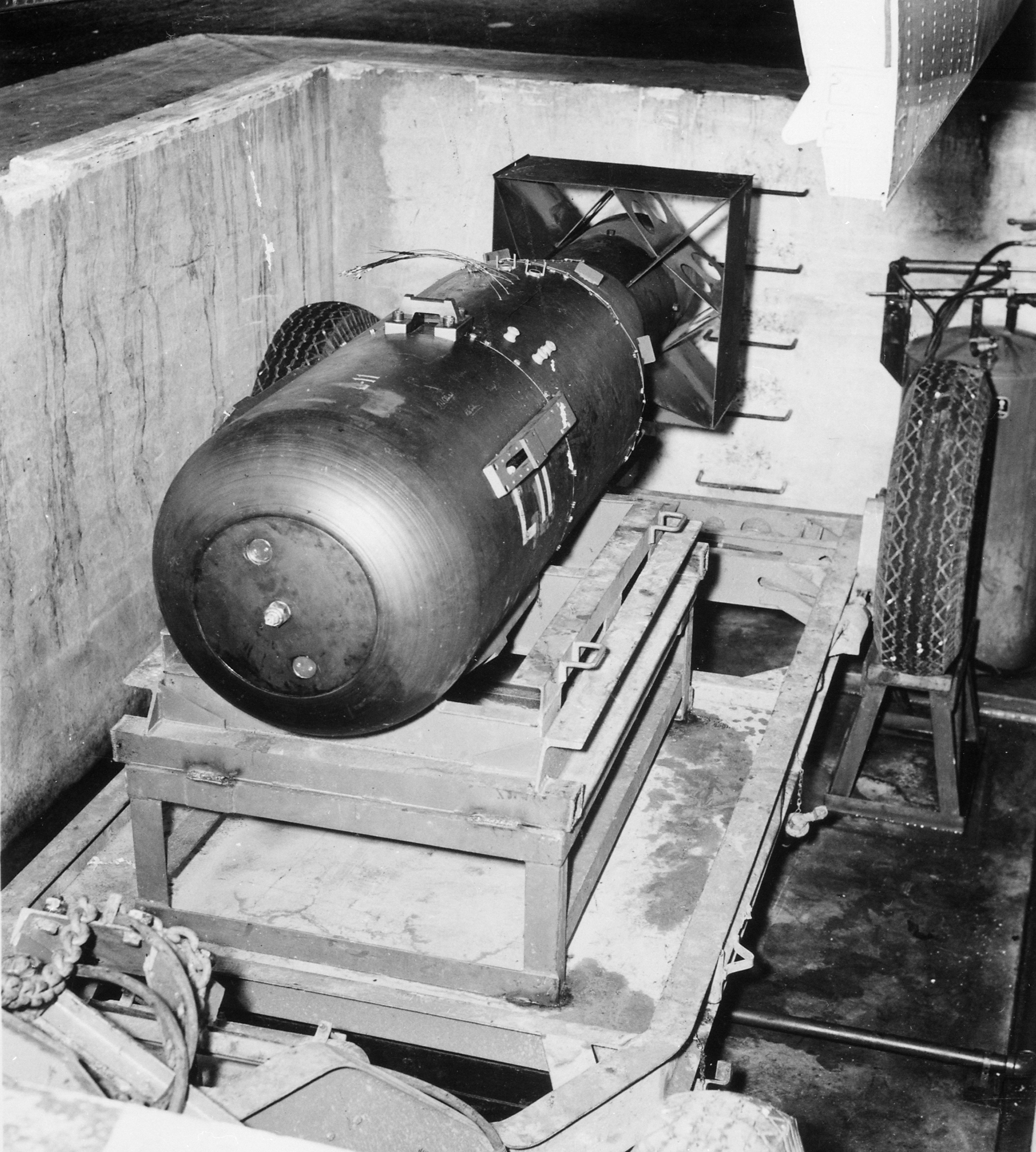
"Little Boy" in the bomb pit on Tinian island, prior to loading aboard Enola Gay

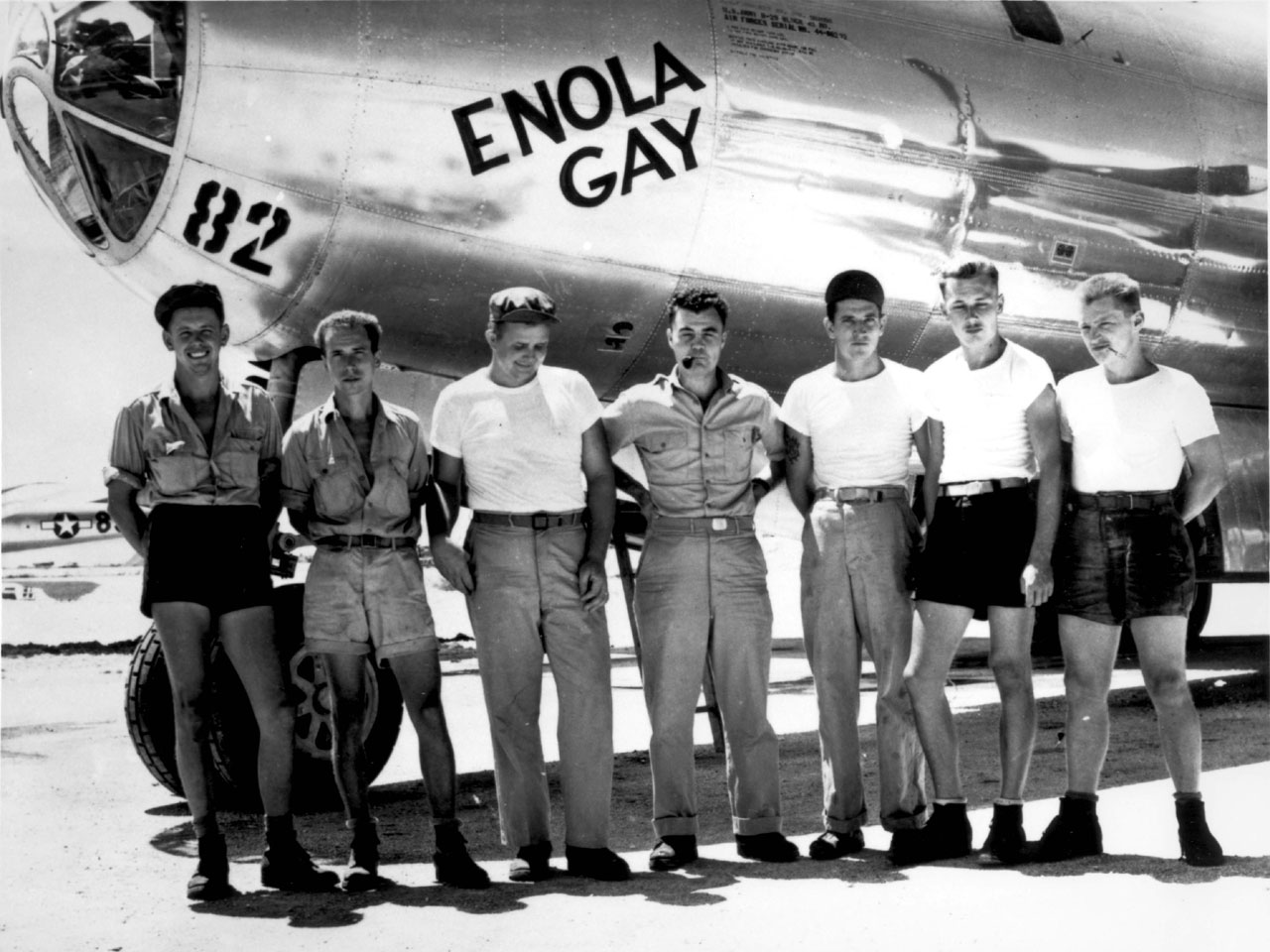
The Enola Gay dropped the "Little Boy" atomic bomb on Hiroshima. Paul Tibbets (center in photograph) can be seen with six members of the ground crew.

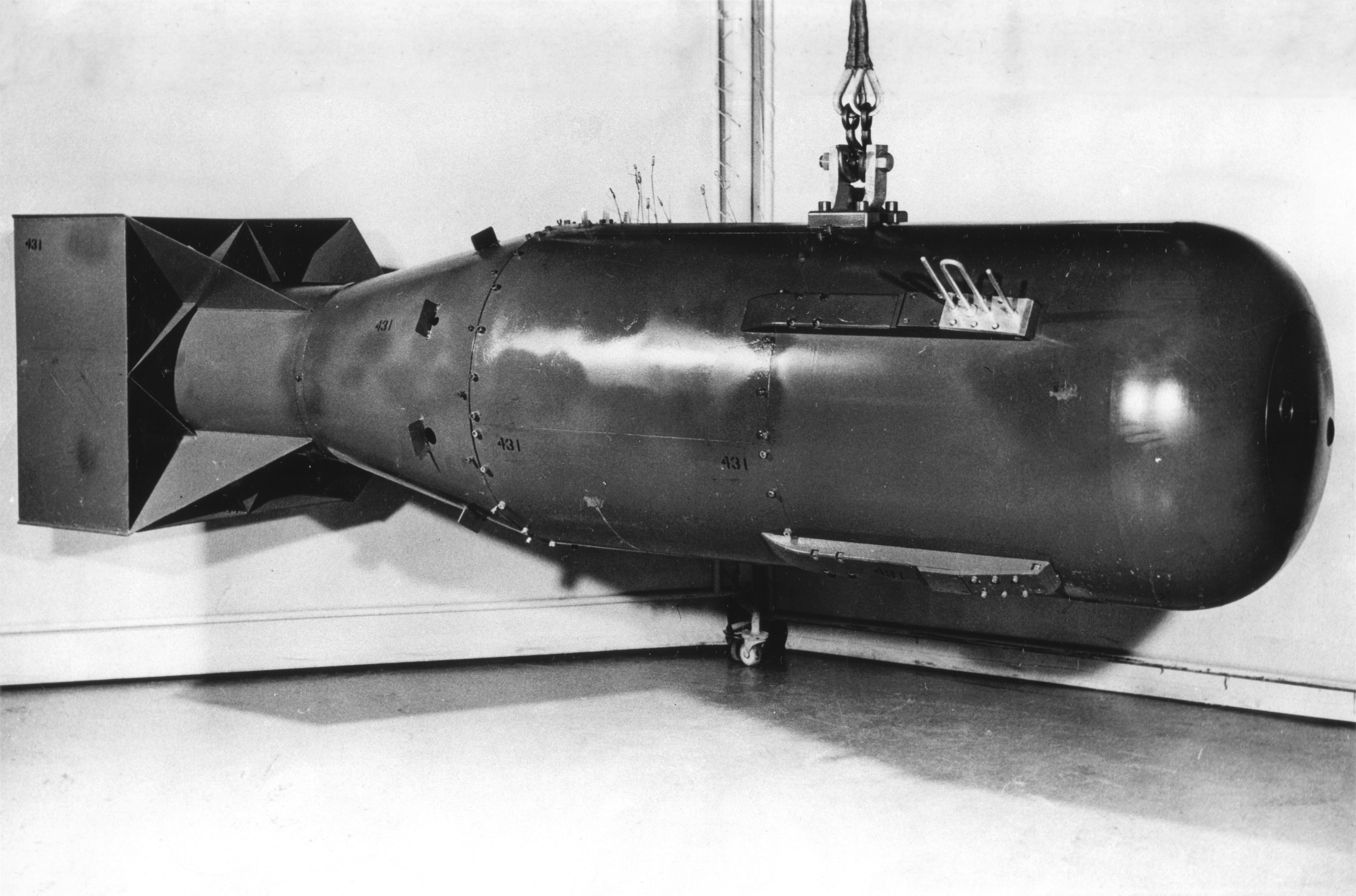
The Mark I "Little Boy" bomb – the model deployed by the B-29 Enola Gay over Hiroshima

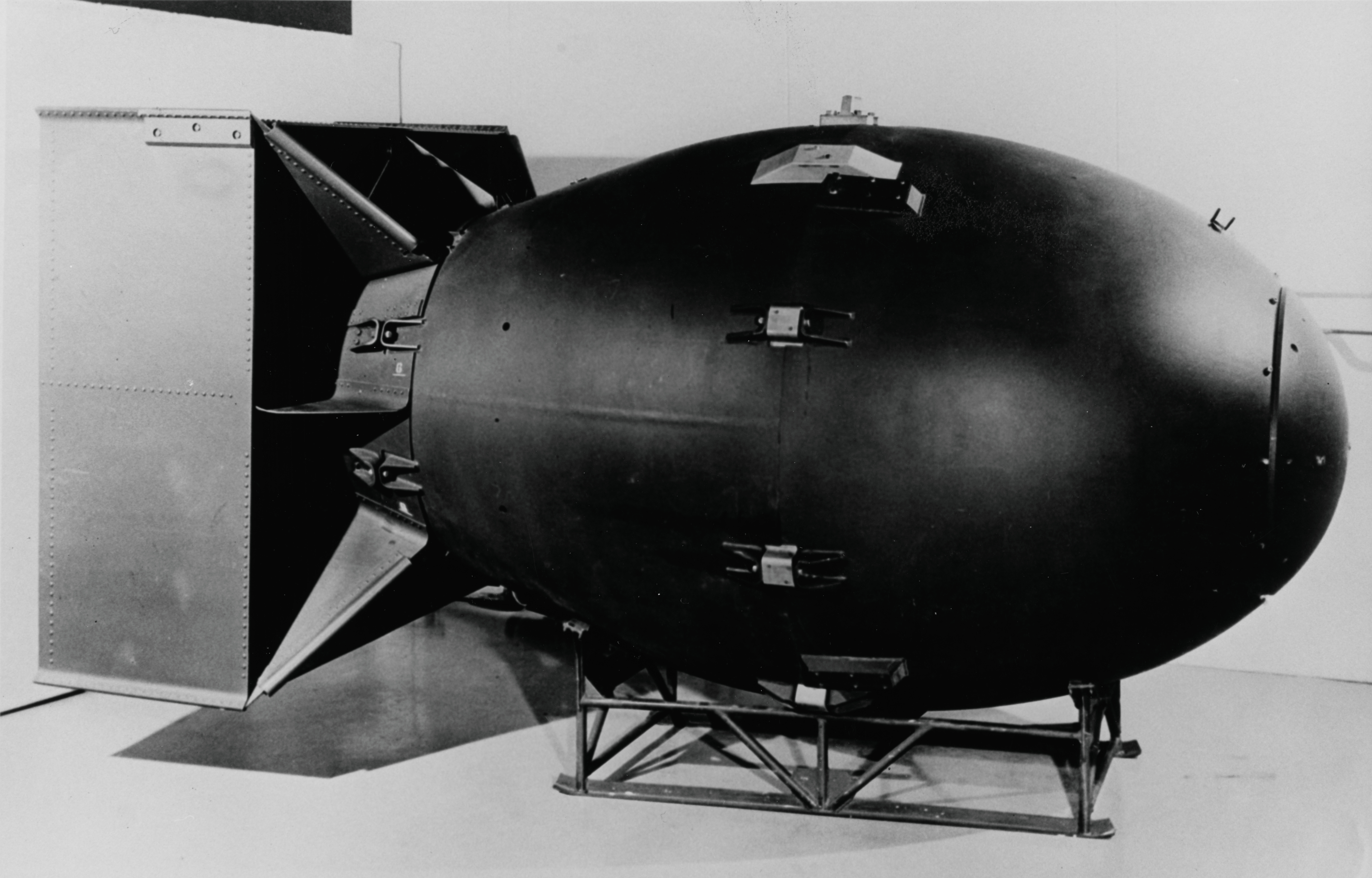
The Mark III "Fat Man" bomb – the model deployed by the B-29 Bockscar over Nagasaki

==== B-29s in Europe and Australia ====
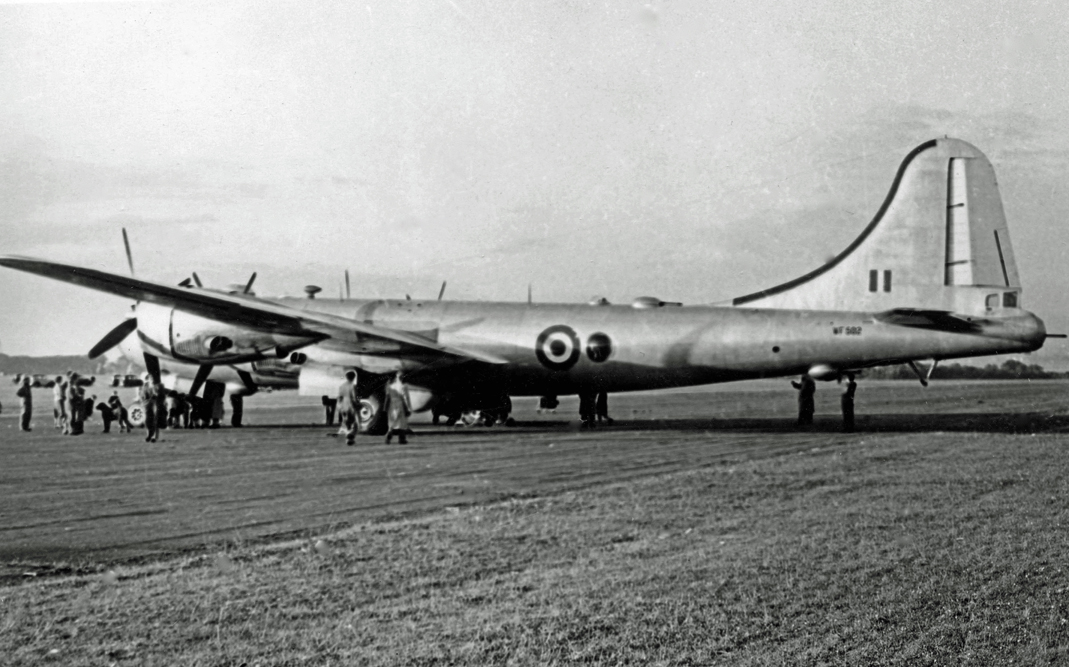
Royal Air Force Washington B.1 of No. 90 Squadron RAF based at RAF Marham

Although considered for other theaters, and briefly evaluated in the UK, the B-29 was exclusively used in World War II in the Pacific Theatre. The use of YB-29-BW 41-36393, the so-named Hobo Queen, one of the service test aircraft flown around several British airfields in early 1944, was part of a "disinformation" program from its mention in an American-published Sternenbanner German-language propaganda leaflet from Leap Year Day in 1944, meant to be circulated within the Reich, with the intent to deceive the Germans into believing that the B-29 would be deployed to Europe.

American post-war military assistance programs loaned the RAF 87 Superfortresses, to equip eight RAF Bomber Command squadrons. The aircraft was known as the Washington B.1 in RAF service and served from March 1950 until the last bombers were returned in March 1954. Deployment was restricted to long-range training for strategic attacks against the Soviet Union, which was beyond the range of the RAF's Avro Lincolns. The phase-out was occasioned by deliveries of the English Electric Canberra bombers.

Three Washingtons modified for ELINT duties and a standard bomber version used for support by No. 192 Squadron RAF were decommissioned in 1958, being replaced by de Havilland Comet aircraft. Two British Washington B.1 aircraft were transferred to the Royal Australian Air Force (RAAF) in 1952. They were attached to the Aircraft Research and Development Unit and used in trials conducted on behalf of the British Ministry of Supply. Both aircraft were placed in storage in 1956 and were sold for scrap in 1957.

=== Soviet Tupolev Tu-4 ===
At the end of World War II, Soviet development of modern four-engine heavy bombers lagged behind the West. The Petlyakov Pe-8—the sole heavy bomber operated by the Soviet Air Forces—first flew in 1936. Intended to replace the obsolete Tupolev TB-3, only 93 Pe-8s were built by the end of the war. During 1944 and 1945, four B-29s made emergency landings in Soviet territory after bombing raids on Japanese Manchuria and Japan. In accordance with Soviet neutrality in the Pacific War, the bombers were interned by the Soviets despite American requests for their return. Rather than return the aircraft, the Soviets reverse engineered the American B-29s and used them as a pattern for the Tupolev Tu-4.

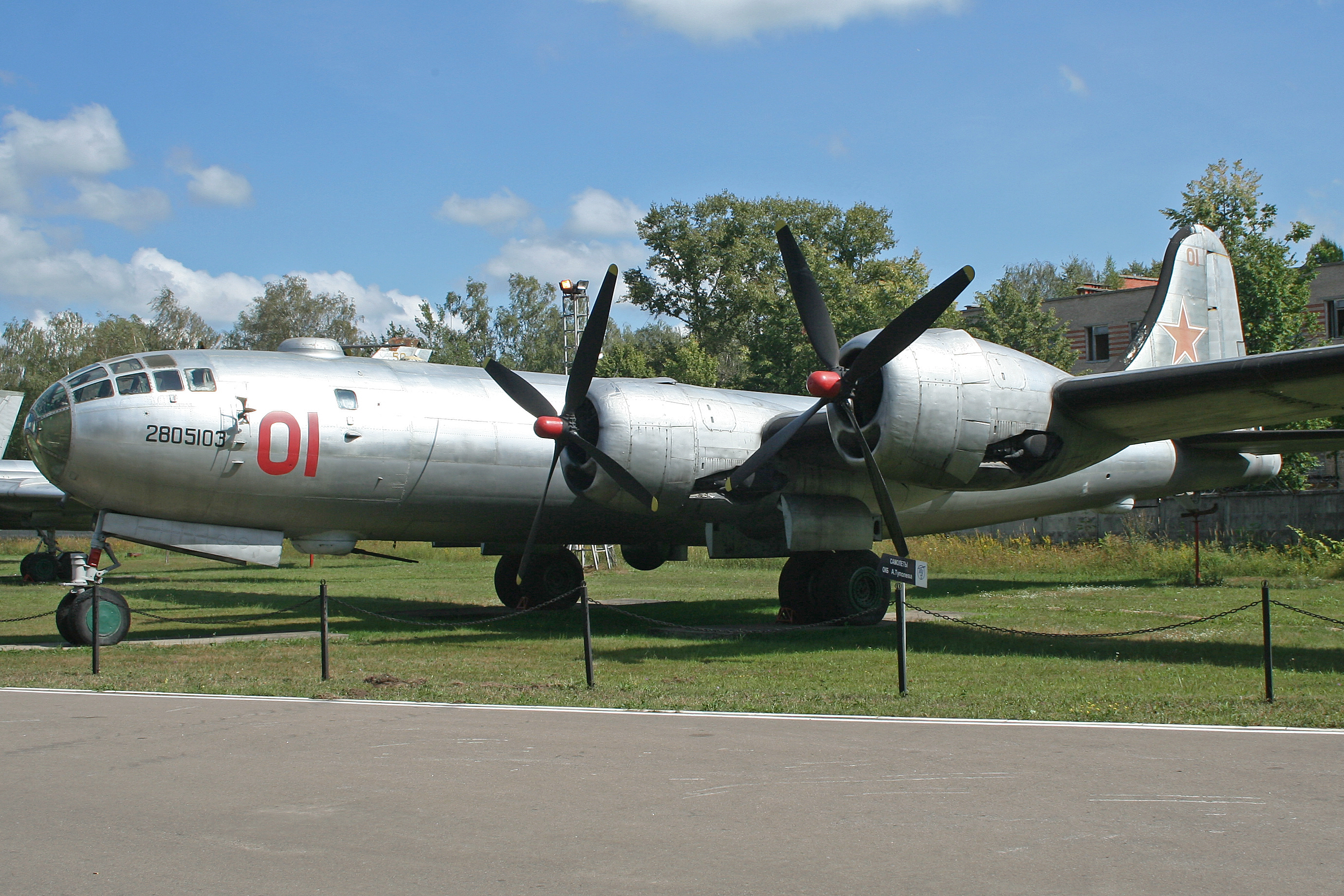
Tupolev Tu-4 at Monino museum

On 31 July 1944, Ramp Tramp (serial number 42-6256), of the United States Army Air Forces 462nd (Very Heavy) Bomb Group was diverted to Vladivostok, Russia, after an engine failed and the propeller could not be feathered. (Note: The drag of the windmilling propeller critically reduced the range of the B-29. Because of this "Ramp Tramp" was unable to reach home base at Chengdu, China, and the pilot opted to head for Vladivostok.) This B-29 was part of a 100-aircraft raid against the Japanese Showa steel mill in Anshan, Manchuria. On 20 August 1944, Cait Paomat (42-93829), flying from Chengdu, was damaged by anti-aircraft gunfire during a raid on the Yawata Iron Works. Due to the damage it sustained, the crew elected to divert to the Soviet Union. The aircraft crashed in the foothills of Sikhote-Alin mountain range east of Khabarovsk after the crew bailed out. On 11 November 1944, during a night raid on Omura in Kyushu, Japan, the General H. H. Arnold Special (42-6365) was damaged and forced to divert to Vladivostok in the Soviet Union. The crew was interned. On 21 November 1944, Ding How (42-6358) was damaged during a raid on an aircraft factory at Omura and was also forced to divert to Vladivostok. The interned crews of these four B-29s were allowed to escape into American-occupied Iran in January 1945, but none of the B-29s were returned after Stalin ordered the Tupolev OKB to examine and copy the B-29 and produce a design ready for quantity production as soon as possible. (Note: Ramp Tramp was also used during 1948–49 as a drop ship for underwing launching of 346P glider. The 346P was a development of the German DFS 346 rocket-powered aircraft. The complete wing and engines of Cait Paomat were later incorporated into the sole Tupolev Tu-70 transport aircraft.) Because aluminum in the USSR was supplied in different gauges from that available in the US (metric vs imperial), the entire aircraft had to be extensively re-engineered. In addition, Tupolev substituted his own favored airfoil sections for those used by Boeing, with the Soviets themselves already having their own Wright R-1820-derived 18 cylinder radial engine, the Shvetsov ASh-73 of comparable power and displacement to the B-29's Duplex Cyclone radials available to power their design. In 1947, the Soviets debuted both the Tupolev Tu-4 (NATO ASCC code named Bull), and the Tupolev Tu-70 transport variant. The Soviets used tail-gunner positions similar to the B-29 in many later bombers and transports. (Note: The Soviets interned another B-29 when, on 29 August 1945, a Soviet Air Force Yak-9 damaged a B-29 dropping supplies to a POW camp in Korea, and forced it to land at Konan (now Hŭngnam), North Korea. The 13-man crew of the B-29 was not injured in the attack and was released after being interned for 13 days.)

"Birth of the B-29" (1945) – official Boeing company promotional film reel

=== Transition to USAF ===
Production of the B-29 was phased out after World War II, with the last example completed by Boeing's Renton factory on 28 May 1946. Many aircraft went into storage, being declared excess inventory, and were ultimately scrapped as surplus. Others remained in the active inventory and equipped the Strategic Air Command when it formed on 21 March 1946. In particular, the "Silverplate" modified aircraft of the 509th Composite Group remained the only aircraft capable of delivering the atomic bomb, and so the unit was involved in the Operation Crossroads series of tests, with B-29 Dave's Dream dropping a Fat Man bomb in Test Able on 1 July 1946.

Some B-29s, fitted with filtered air sampling scoops, were used to monitor above-ground nuclear weapons testing by the US and the USSR by sampling airborne radioactive contamination. The USAF also used the aircraft for long-range weather reconnaissance (WB-29), for signals intelligence gathering (EB-29) and photographic reconnaissance (RB-29).

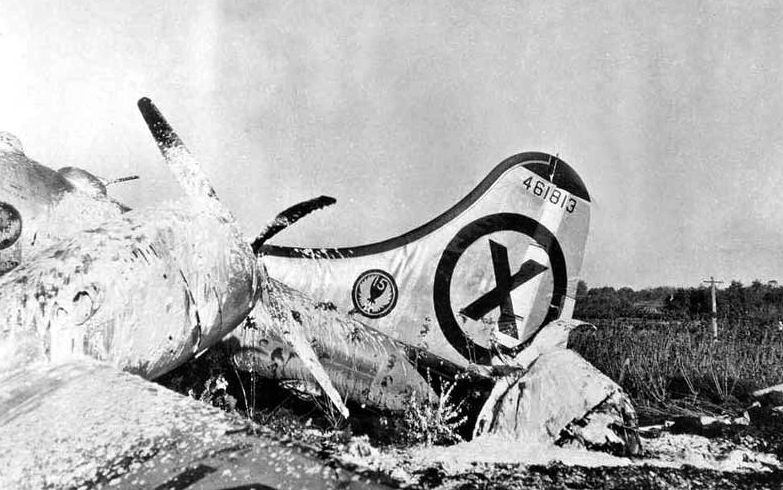
Photo-reconnaissance B-29 that crashed on final approach to Iruma Air Base, Japan, after an attack by several MIG-15's over the Yalu River. Five crew died. The tail gunner shot down a MiG, and the remaining Migs were engaged by their P-51 escort (9 November 1950).

=== Korean War and postwar service ===
The B-29 was used in 1950–1953 in the Korean War. At first, the bomber was used in normal strategic bombing day-missions, although North Korea's few strategic targets and industries were quickly destroyed. More importantly, in 1950 numbers of Soviet MiG-15 jet fighters appeared over Korea, and after the loss of 28 aircraft, future B-29 raids were restricted to night missions, largely in a supply-interdiction role. The B-29 dropped the 1,000 lb (450 kg) VB-3 "Razon" (a range-controllable version of the earlier Azon guided ordnance device) and the 12,000 lb (5,400 kg) VB-13 "Tarzon" MCLOS radio-controlled bombs in Korea, mostly for demolishing major bridges, like the ones across the Yalu River, and for attacks on dams. The aircraft also was used for numerous leaflet drops in North Korea, such as those for Operation Moolah.

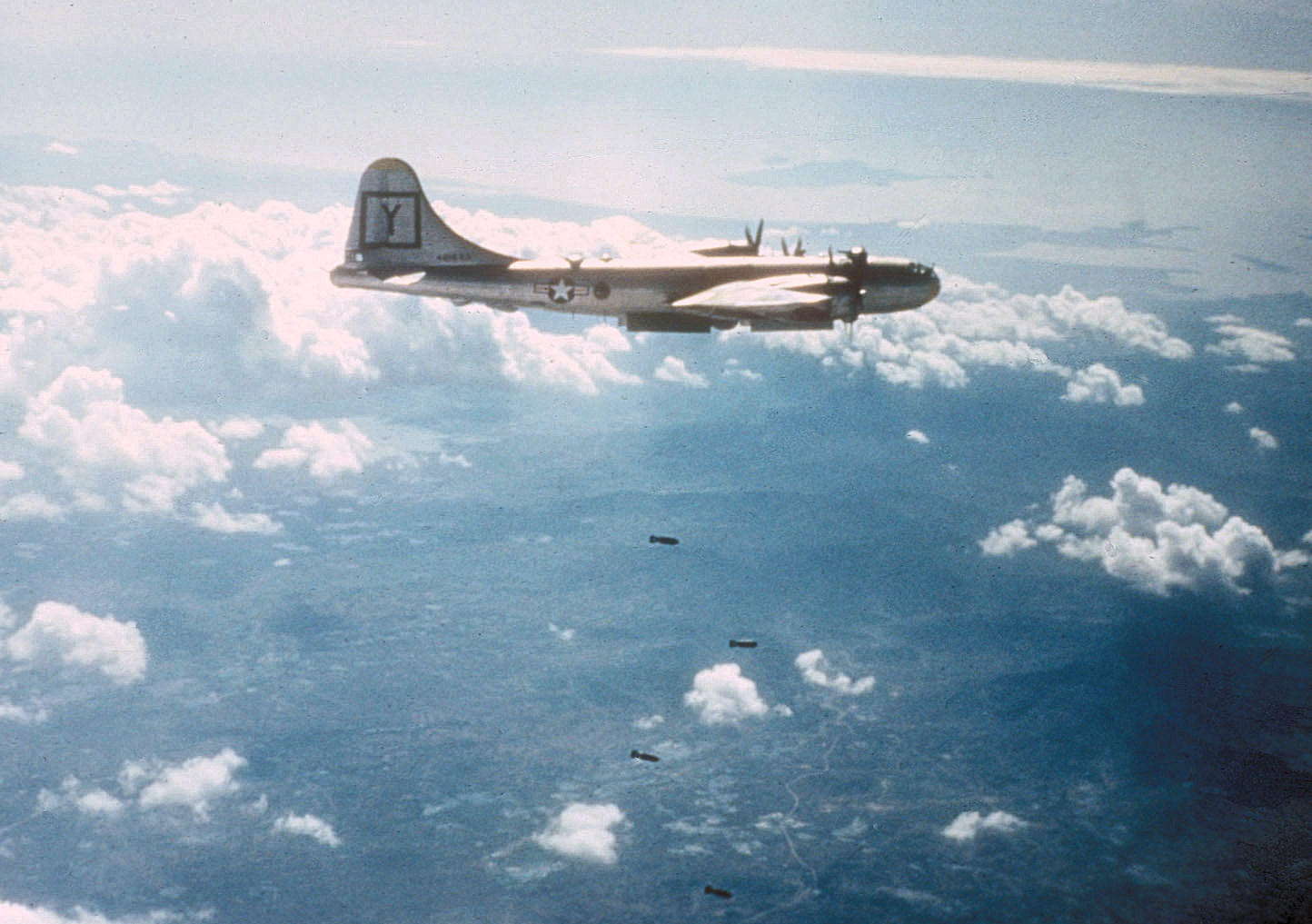
A 307th Bomb Group B-29 bombing a target in Korea, c. 1951

Over the course of the war, B-29s flew 20,000 sorties and dropped 220,000 short tons (200,000 t) of bombs in Korea. B-29 gunners were credited with shooting down 27 enemy aircraft. In turn 78 B-29s were lost; 57 B-29 and reconnaissance variants were lost in action and 21 were non-combat losses. Soviet records show that one MiG-15 jet fighter was shot down by a B-29 during the war. This occurred on 6 December 1950, when a B-29 shot down Lieutenant N. Serikov. A Superfortress of the 91st Strategic Reconnaissance Squadron flew the last B-29 mission of the war on 27 July 1953.

With the arrival of the mammoth Convair B-36, the B-29 was reclassified as a medium bomber by the Air Force. The later B-50 Superfortress variant (initially designated B-29D) was able to handle auxiliary roles such as air-sea rescue, electronic intelligence gathering, air-to-air refueling, and weather reconnaissance. The B-50D was replaced in its primary role during the early 1950s by the Boeing B-47 Stratojet, which in turn was replaced by the Boeing B-52 Stratofortress. The final active-duty KB-50 and WB-50 variants were phased out in the mid-1960s, with the final example retired in 1965. A total of 3,970 B-29s were built.

== Variants ==
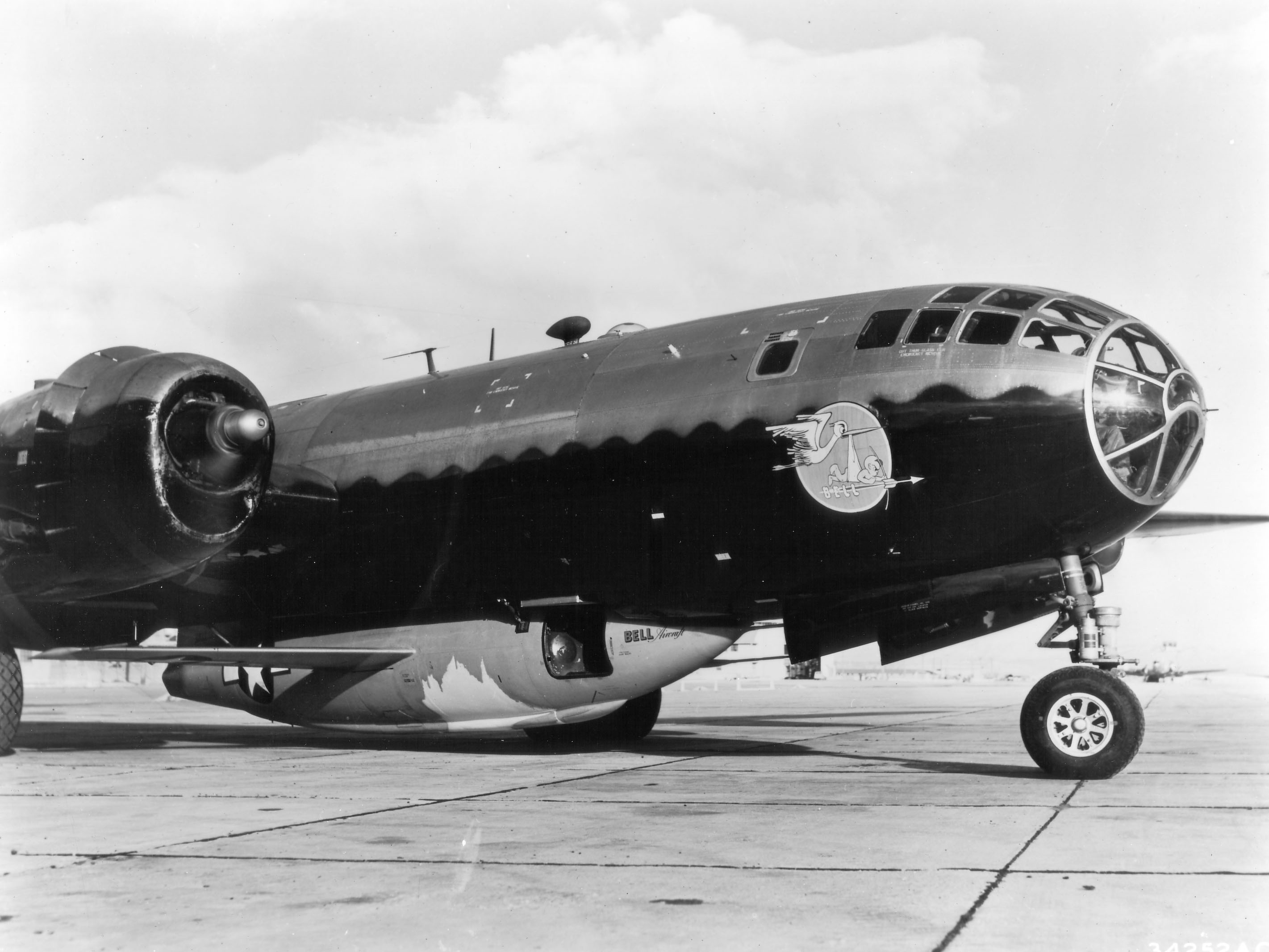
Bell X-1 and its B-29 mother ship

The variants of the B-29 were outwardly similar in appearance but were built around different wing center sections that affected the wingspan dimensions. The wing of the Renton-built B-29A-BN used a different subassembly process and was a foot longer in span. The Georgia-built B-29B-BA weighed less through armament reduction. A planned C series with more reliable R-3350s was not built. Moreover, engine packages changed, including the type of propellers and range of the variable pitch. A notable example was the eventual 65 airframes (up to 1947's end) for the Silverplate and successor-name "Saddletree" specifications built for the Manhattan Project with Curtiss Electric reversible pitch propellers.

"Breaking the Sound Barrier" (1947) Official USAF Bell X-1 promotional film reel.

The Silverplate aircraft had significantly modified electronics and armament. The jammers were removed and replaced with additional AN/APR-4 radio frequency monitoring equipment, because the atomic bombs used a modified tail radar for a radar altimeter, and the lack of delayed arming could cause unintended detonation immediately after release. This was due to the C-3A release mechanism arming the weapon immediately upon release with no delay, making it absolutely necessary to monitor the frequencies used by the radar altimeters. Targeting was accomplished using a license built version of the British H2S, designated the AN/APQ-13 in American service. This provided both guidance and targeting, as well as timing the bomb release precisely.

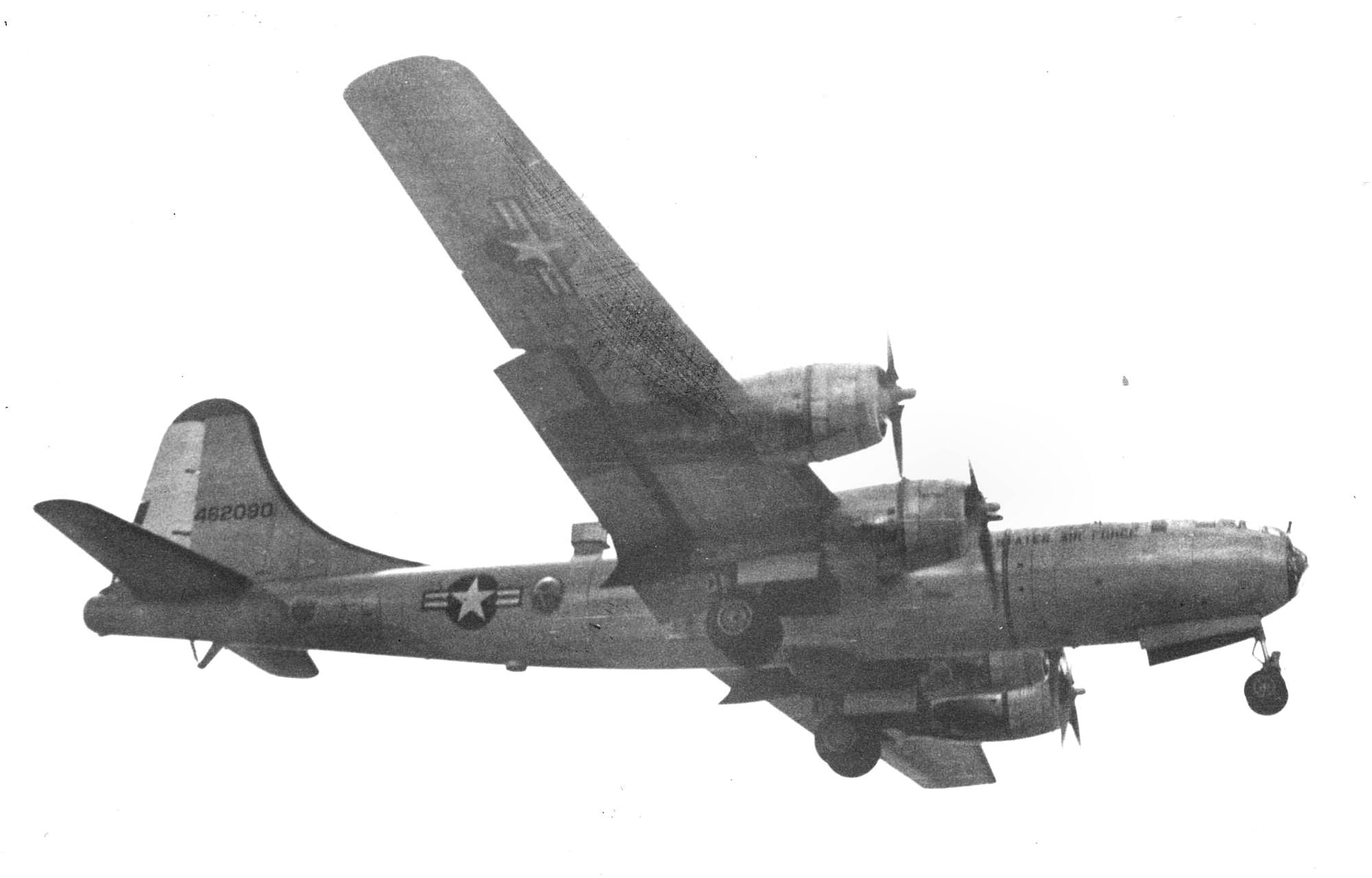
WB-29A of the 53d Weather Reconnaissance Squadron in 1954 showing the fuselage-top observation station

The other differences came through added equipment for varied mission roles. These roles included cargo carriers (CB); rescue aircraft (SB); weather ships (WB); and trainers (TB); and aerial tankers (KB). Some were used for odd purposes such as flying relay television transmitters under the name of Stratovision. Another role was as a mothership. This included being rigged for carrying the experimental parasite fighter aircraft, such as the McDonnell XF-85 Goblin and Republic F-84 Thunderjets as in flight lock on and offs. It was also used to develop the Airborne Early Warning program; it was the ancestor of various modern radar picket aircraft. A B-29 with the original Wright Duplex Cyclone powerplants was used to air-launch the Bell X-1 supersonic research rocket aircraft, as well as Cherokee rockets for the testing of ejection seats.

The B-29D led progressively to the XB-44, and the family of B-50 Superfortress (which was powered by four 3,500 hp (2,600 kW) Pratt & Whitney R-4360-35 Wasp Major engines). Some B-29s were modified to act as testbeds for various new systems or special conditions, including fire-control systems, cold-weather operations, and various armament configurations. Several converted B-29s were used to experiment with aerial refueling and re-designated as KB-29s. Perhaps the most important tests were conducted by the XB-29G. It carried prototype jet engines in its bomb bay, and lowered them into the air stream to conduct measurements.

== Operators ==
Australia

- Royal Australian Air Force (two former RAF aircraft for trials)

United Kingdom

- Royal Air Force (87 loaned from the USAF as the Washington B.1)

United States

- United States Army Air Forces
- United States Air Force
- United States Navy (four former USAF aircraft designated as P2B patrol bombers)

Soviet Union

- Soviet Air Forces (three USAAF B-29s made emergency landings in the USSR during World War II, and were never returned; they were reverse-engineered to make the Soviet Tupolev Tu-4 "Bull" bomber.)

== Surviving aircraft ==
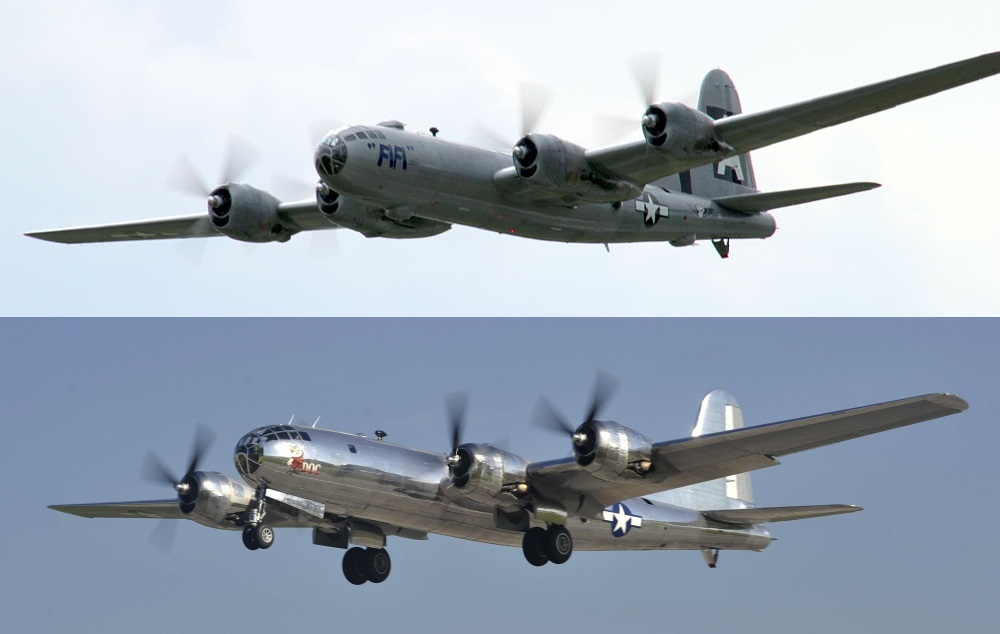
The two remaining flyable B-29s: FIFI (top) and Doc (bottom)

Twenty-two B-29s are preserved at various museums worldwide, including two flying examples; FIFI, which belongs to the Commemorative Air Force, and Doc, which belongs to Doc's Friends. Doc made its first flight in 60 years from Wichita, Kansas, on 17 July 2016. The public is being invited to inspect and take a short paid flight in Doc and Fifi at various venues.

Three of the Silverplate B-29s modified to drop nuclear bombs survived. Superfortress 44-86292 Enola Gay (nose number 82), which dropped the first atomic bomb, was fully restored and placed on display at the Smithsonian's Steven F. Udvar-Hazy Center of the National Air & Space Museum near Washington Dulles International Airport in 2003. The B-29 that dropped Fat Man on Nagasaki, Superfortress 44-27297 Bockscar (nose number 77), is restored and on display at the National Museum of the United States Air Force at Wright-Patterson AFB in Dayton, Ohio, posed with a replica of the Mark 3 Fat Man nuclear bomb. The third is Superfortress 45-21748, which was delivered on 9 August 1945 and is on display at the National Museum of Nuclear Science and History in Albuquerque, New Mexico.

Only two of the twenty-two museum aircraft are outside the United States: It's Hawg Wild at the Imperial War Museum Duxford and another at the KAI Aerospace Museum in Sachon, South Korea.

== Accidents and incidents ==
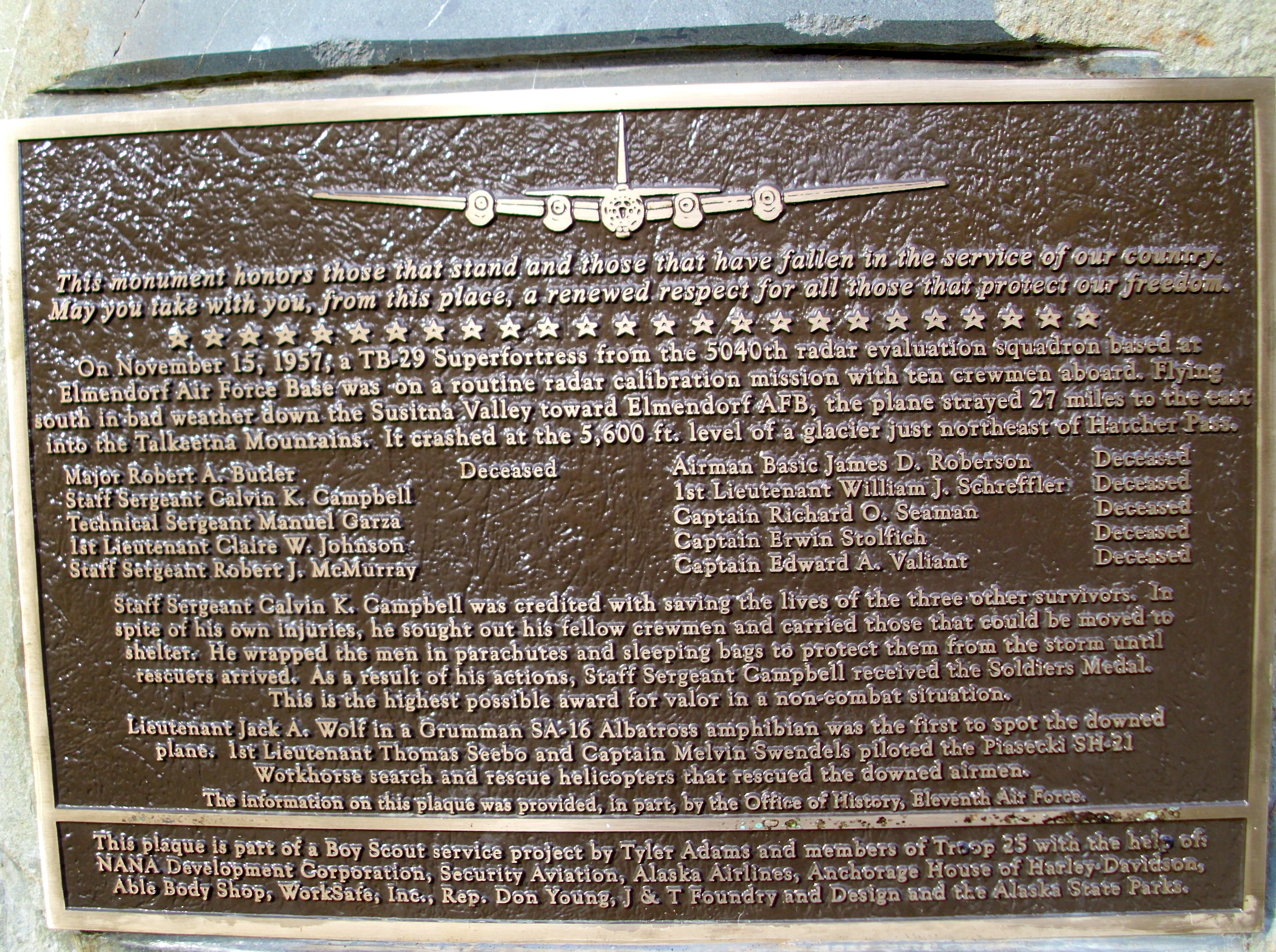
Memorial at the Alaska Veterans Memorial to the victims in a B-29 crash in the Talkeetna Mountains in 1957

Notable accidents and incidents involving B-29s include:

- The 1947 crash of the Kee Bird in Greenland during a flight to the geographic North Pole, and its subsequent destruction in 1995 during a recovery attempt.
- The 1948 Waycross B-29 crash, which resulted in the United States v. Reynolds lawsuit regarding state secrets privilege.
- The 1948 Lake Mead Boeing B-29 crash during the "Sun Tracker" project that aimed to develop an intercontinental ballistic missile guidance system that used the sun for direction and positioning.
- The 3 November 1948 crash at Bleaklow moor near Glossop, Derbyshire, England. Much of the wreckage is still exposed and can be reached by a 2-mile (3.2 km) walk from the summit of Snake Pass, starting along the Pennine Way footpath through Devil's Dyke.
- On 11 April 1950 a B-29 departed Kirtland Air Force Base and crashed into a mountain on Manzano Base approximately three minutes later, killing the crew. Detonators were installed in the nuclear bomb on the aircraft. The bomb case was demolished and some high-explosive (HE) material burned in the fire. Both the weapon and the capsule of nuclear material were on board but the capsule was not inserted in the bomb for safety reasons, so no nuclear detonation was possible.
- On 5 August 1950, a B-29 carrying a Mark 4 nuclear bomb crashed shortly after takeoff from Fairfield-Suisun Air Force Base with 20 men on board. Twelve men were killed in the crash, including Brigadier General Robert F. Travis, and another seven on the ground when the aircraft exploded. The base was later renamed after Travis.

== Specifications ==
Boeing B-29 Superfortress three-view drawing

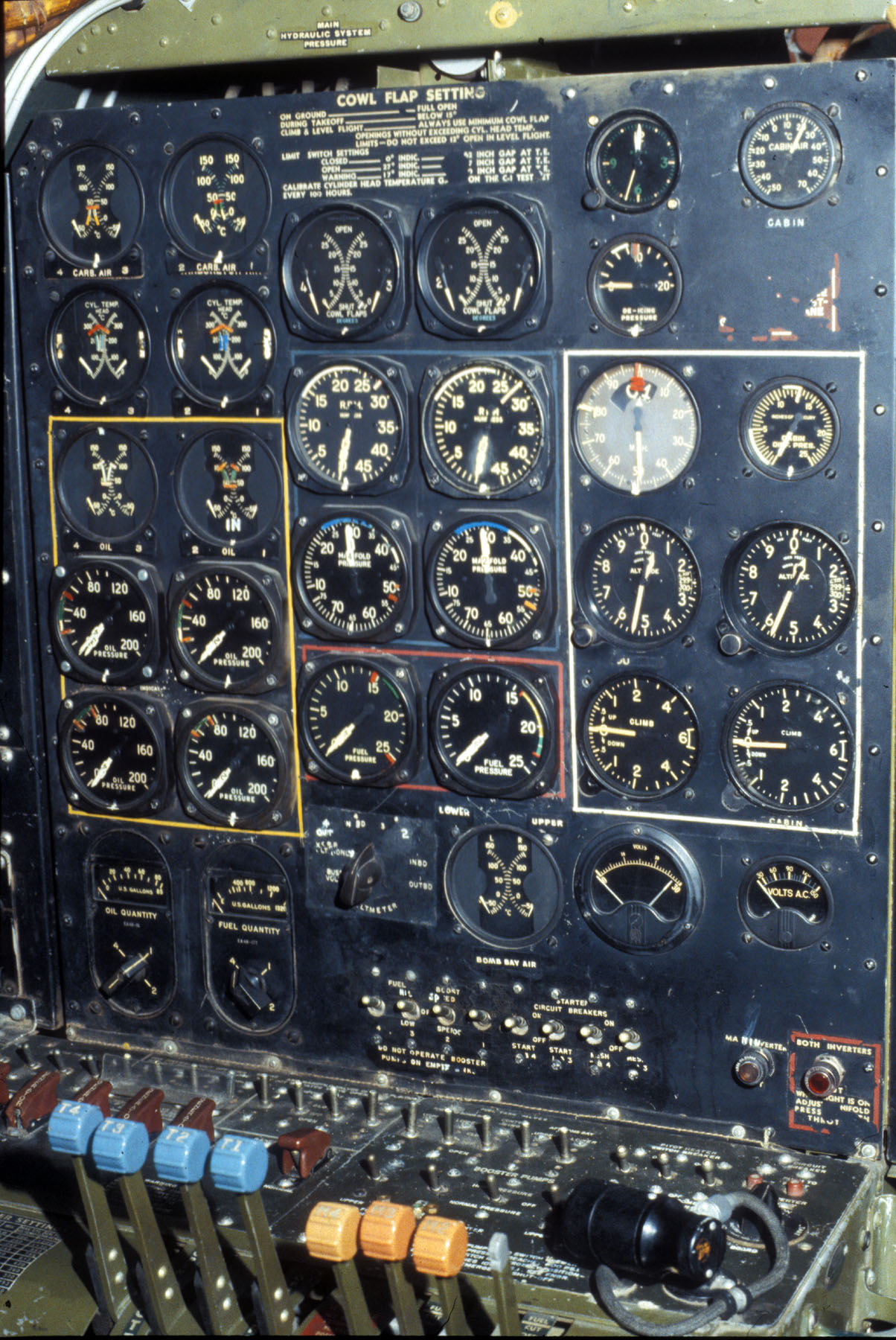
Flight engineer's station of Bockscar

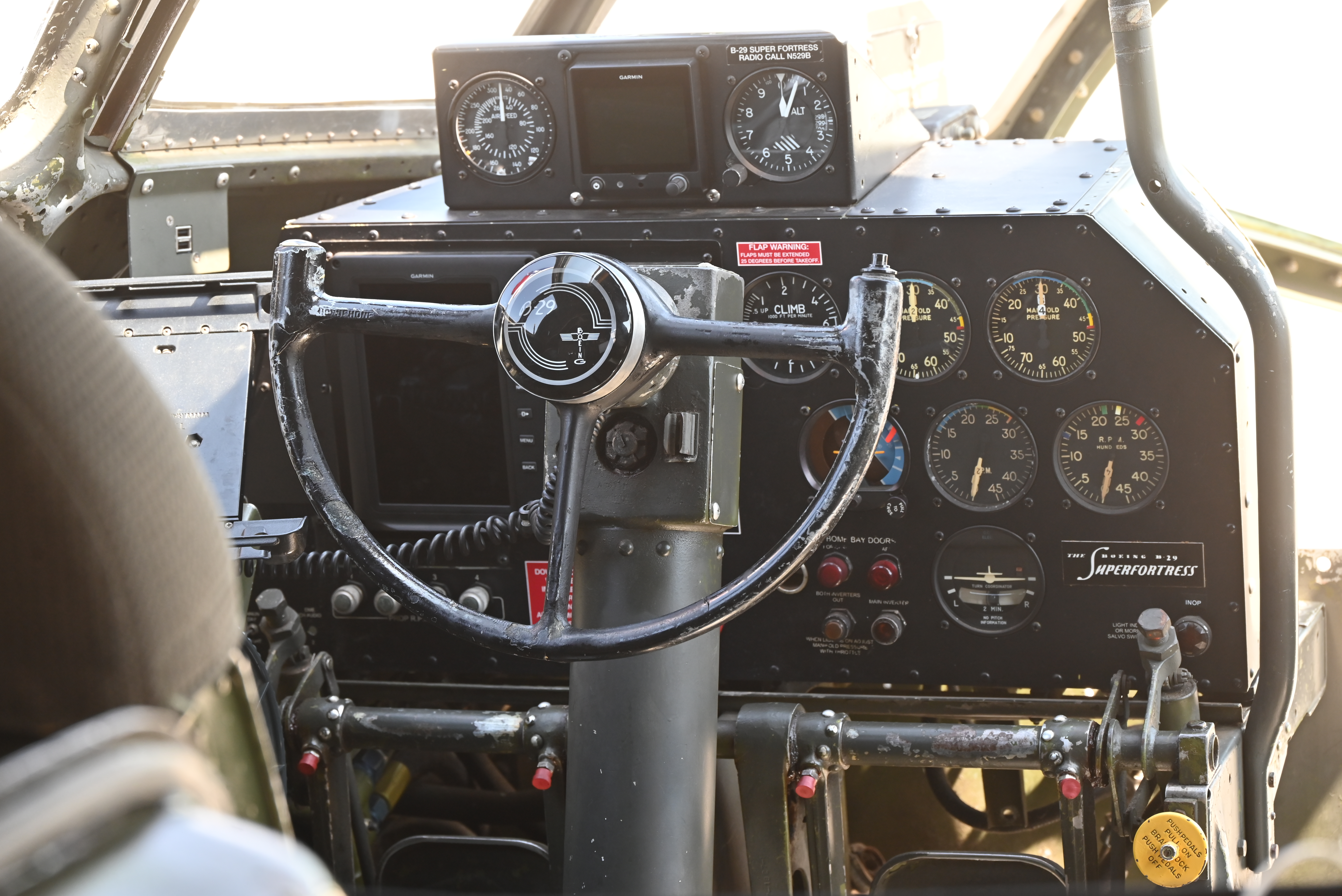
Cockpit in FIFI

Data from Quest for Performance

General characteristics

- Crew: 11 (Pilot, co-pilot, bombardier, flight engineer, navigator, radio operator, radar observer, right gunner, left gunner, central fire control, tail gunner)
- Length: 99 ft 0 in (30.18 m)
- Wingspan: 141 ft 3 in (43.05 m)
- Height: 27 ft 9 in (8.46 m)
- Wing area: 1,736 sq ft (161.3 m^{2})
- Aspect ratio: 11.5
- Airfoil: root: Boeing 117 (22%); tip: Boeing 117 (9%)
- Zero-lift drag coefficient: 0.0241
- Frontal area: 41.16 ft^{2} (3.824 m^{2})
- Empty weight: 74,500 lb (33,793 kg)
- Gross weight: 120,000 lb (54,431 kg)
- Max takeoff weight: 133,500 lb (60,555 kg)

135,000 lb (61,000 kg) combat overload

- Powerplant: 4 × Wright R-3350-23 Duplex-Cyclone 18-cylinder air-cooled turbosupercharged radial piston engines, 2,200 hp (1,600 kW) each
- Propellers: 4-bladed constant-speed fully-feathering propellers, 16 ft 7 in (5.05 m) diameter

Performance

- Maximum speed: 357 mph (575 km/h, 310 kn)
- Cruise speed: 220 mph (350 km/h, 190 kn)
- Stall speed: 105 mph (169 km/h, 91 kn)
- Range: 3,250 mi (5,230 km, 2,820 nmi)
- Ferry range: 5,600 mi (9,000 km, 4,900 nmi)
- Service ceiling: 31,850 ft (9,710 m)
- Rate of climb: 900 ft/min (4.6 m/s)
- Lift-to-drag: 16.8
- Wing loading: 69.12 lb/sq ft (337.5 kg/m^{2})
- Power/mass: 0.073 hp/lb (0.120 kW/kg)

Armament

- Guns:
  - 10 × .50 in (12.7 mm) Browning M2/ANs in remote-controlled turrets. (omitted from Silverplate B-29s)
  - 2 × .50 BMG and 1× 20 mm M2 cannon in tail position (the cannon was later removed) (Note: For the B-29B-BW all armament and sighting equipment was removed except for tail position; initially 2 x .50 in M2/AN and 1× 20 mm M2 cannon, later 3 × 2 × .50 in M2/AN with APG-15 gun-laying radar fitted as standard.)
- Bombs:
  - 5,000 lb (2,300 kg) over 1,600 miles (2,600 km; 1,400 nmi) radius at high altitude
  - 12,000 lb (5,400 kg) over 1,600 miles (2,600 km; 1,400 nmi) radius at medium altitude
  - 20,000 lb (9,100 kg) maximum over short distances at low altitude
  - Could be modified to carry two 22,000 lb (10,000 kg) Grand Slam bombs externally, or one 44,600 pound T-12 Cloudmaker deep penetration bomb.
  - Mark I, Mark III, Mark 4 and Mark 6 nuclear bombs (only Silverplate versions of the aircraft).

== See also ==
- Air warfare of World War II
- AN/APQ-13

Aircraft of comparable role, configuration, and era

- Amerikabomber
- Avro Lincoln
- Nakajima G8N Renzan
- Heinkel He 277
- Junkers Ju 290
- Messerschmitt Me 264
- Victory Bomber

Related lists

- List of aircraft of World War II
- List of bomber aircraft
- List of military aircraft of the United States
