= Skokie (rocket) =

Family of research vehicles

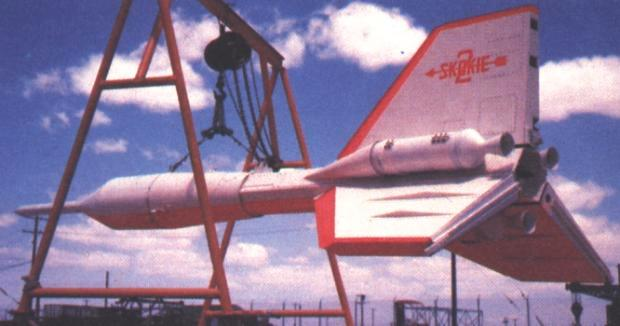
- Skokie 2
- Function: Experimental rocket
- Manufacturer: Cook Electric Co.
- Country of origin: United States

Size
- Height: Skokie 1: 7.6 metres (25 ft); Skokie 2: 9.8 metres (32 ft)
- Diameter: Skokie 1: 510 millimetres (20 in)
- Mass: Skokie 1: 1,100 kilograms (2,400 lb); Skokie 2: 1,400 kilograms (3,000 lb)
- Stages: One

Launch history
- Status: Retired

First stage – JATO
- Powered by: 3
- Maximum thrust: 49 kN (11,000 lb_{f}) each
- Propellant: Solid

Skokie was a family of research vehicles developed by the Cook Electric Co. for the United States Air Force during the mid to late 1950s. Launched from a B-29 bomber, Skokie 1 was an unpowered, ballistic vehicle, while Skokie 2 was rocket-propelled; both were used for evaluating and testing high-speed parachute recovery systems.

== Design and development ==
Intended for use in evaluating high-speed parachute systems for the recovery of missiles and unmanned aircraft, Skokie was a simple, inexpensively-designed vehicle, consisting of a tube with a long spike on the nose to reduce damage while landing under parachute. Named after the hometown of the Cook Electric Co., their manufacturer, Skokie 1 had four aft-mounted stabilizing fins; Skokie 2 had a tri-fin arrangement, with three solid-propellant rockets, of a type similar to that used for rocket-assisted take offs, externally mounted between them. The vehicle was equipped with instrumentation to record the deployment of the two-stage parachute; a high-speed camera was also fitted. Skokie I descended ballistically at high subsonic speed; the rocket-powered Skokie II could reach Mach 2 before deploying its parachute.

== Mission profile ==
Skokie was launched from a Boeing B-29 Superfortress bomber at 30,000 feet (9.1 km) in altitude. On each drop, the vehicle would deploy an initial parachute to calibrate the onboard equipment, following which it would be released to allow the vehicle to build up speed. A drogue parachute would be deployed once the vehicle reached a speed slightly below terminal velocity; after deceleration, the main parachute of 88 feet (27 m) in diameter would deploy.
