= List of surviving Boeing B-29 Superfortresses =

The Boeing B-29 Superfortress is a United States heavy bomber used by the United States Army Air Forces in the Pacific Theatre during World War II, and by the United States Air Force during the Korean War. Of the 3,970 built, 26 survive in complete form today, 24 of which reside in the United States, and two of which are airworthy.

== Background ==
In September 1945, following the surrender of Japan, all contracts for further production of the B-29 were terminated, after 3,970 aircraft (2,766 by Boeing Aircraft, 668 by Bell Aircraft, and 536 by Glenn L. Martin Co.) had been accepted by the USAAF. Uncompleted airframes at the Boeing plant in Wichita, Kansas, were stripped of all government-furnished equipment and scrapped on site.

A vast majority of the B-29s were stored by a new process of cocooning. However, this process trapped heat and moisture inside the fuselage, resulting in damage to numerous airframes, primarily the avionics and instruments. Between 1946 and 1949, many early and high-time combat veteran aircraft were sold or scrapped. None were released to civilian use.

The majority of the surviving B-29s came from airframes that had served with the United States Navy at NAWS China Lake as target-tow aircraft, then unmanned target aircraft, and finally as ground targets. Additional B-29s were used at Aberdeen Proving Ground as ground targets and for survivability studies. Since the early 1970s, various B-29s have been recovered from China Lake and Aberdeen for museum displays – the last B-29 (Doc) removed from China Lake in 2000 was restored to flying condition.

Additional aircraft have been discovered at both post-war crash sites and near World War II Pacific airfields. There is a search for the first B-29 to bomb Japan, Dauntless Dotty which crashed into the Pacific Ocean on take-off during her return flight to the United States. If the airplane is found, there are plans to recover and restore it for display. In 1995, an attempt to recover the Kee Bird, which had crashed in 1947 in northern Greenland, resulted in the almost complete destruction of the plane's fuselage by fire, started by a malfunctioning auxiliary power unit in the tail.

== Surviving aircraft ==
=== Surviving aircraft by manufacturers ===
Plant	Number produced	Number surviving (complete)	Number surviving (partial)
Boeing Renton (BN)	1,122	9	3
Boeing Wichita (BW)	1,644	9	3
Bell Atlanta (BA)	668	2	1
Martin Omaha (MO)	536	5	0
	3,970	25	7

=== Surviving aircraft ===
Serial	Photo	Geographic location	Institutional location	Status	History
42-24791		(United States) College Park, Maryland	QuestMasters Museum	Undergoing restoration	Built at Boeing Wichita as a B-29. Delivered on 17 October 1944, it was assigned to the 1st Bomb Squadron, 9th Bomb Group. Nicknamed "The Big Time Operator". It flew 46 combat missions from North Field, Tinian over Japan. Stricken in 1950 and sent to Naval Air Weapons Station China Lake. Its nose section was recovered and placed at Edward F. Beale Museum until 2001. The Museum of Flight used it as a parts source for the restoration of 44-69729, and later the New England Air Museum scavenged parts from it to restore Jack’s Hack. QuestMasters Museum acquired the nose section of the aircraft in November 2012.
42-65281		(United States) Fairfield, California	Travis Air Force Base Aviation Museum	Static display	Built at Martin Omaha as B-29. Delivered to USAAF on 11 December 1944. Assigned to 24th Bombardment Squadron, 6th Bombardment Group, 313th Bombardment Wing. Piloted by Bruce R. Alger who named the plane "Miss America '62" after his newborn daughter, who would be 18 years old in 1962. Flew 30 combat missions from North Field, Tinian. Returned to US in October 1945. Used at various bases until the late 1950s. Used as target at Naval Air Weapons Station China Lake from 1960 to 1985. Removed in 1986 and sent to Travis AFB for restoration, which was completed in 1994. At unveiling on 18 June 1994, Alger's wife Linda spoke.
42-93967		(United States) Cordele, Georgia	Georgia Veterans Memorial State Park	Static display	Built at Boeing Renton as B-29A. Subsequently converted to RB-29A. Flown on combat reconnaissance missions with the 19th Bombardment Group from North Field, Guam. Carried name "City of Lansford, PA".
44-27297		(United States) Dayton, Ohio	National Museum of the United States Air Force	Static display	Built at Martin Omaha as B-29 and modified to a Silverplate during production. Delivered to USAAF on 19 March 1945 and assigned to Frederick C. Bock at Wendover AAF in April. Given the name "Bockscar" by her crew. Arrived in Tinian 16 June for service with the 393d Bombardment Squadron, 509th Composite Group. On 9 August was flown by Charles W. Sweeney and dropped the Fat Man atomic bomb on Nagasaki. Returned to the US in November and sent to Roswell AAF. Placed in storage at Davis-Monthan AAF in 1946. In September 1961 flown to National Museum, where it has been on display since.
44-27343		(United States) Oklahoma City, Oklahoma	Tinker Air Force Base	Static display	Built at Martin Omaha as B-29. Later converted to WB-29, she operated in the 57th Weather Reconnaissance Squadron in the early to mid 1950s. In 1955 sent to Aberdeen Proving Ground for use as a target. Recovered in 1985, restored, and placed on display.
44-61535		(United States) Atwater, California	Castle Air Museum	Static display	Built at Boeing Renton as B-29A. During the Korean War was part of the 28th Bombardment Squadron, 19th Bombardment Group and flew from Kadena Airbase. Given the name "Raz'n Hell" by her crew. Flew roughly 50 combat missions. Returned to US after war. In 1958 sent to Naval Air Weapons Station China Lake for use as a target. Recovered in 1980 and put on display. Uses tail of 44–61535, outer wings of 44–84084, and fuselage and inner wings of 44–70064.
44-61669		(United States) Riverside, California	March Field Air Museum	Static display	Built at Boeing Renton as B-29A. Delivered to USAAF 5 May 1945. Flew with 457th Bombardment Squadron, 330th Bombardment Group, 314th Bombardment Wing from North Field, Guam. Coded as "K 15". During the Korean War assigned to 581st Air Resupply Group at Kadena Air Base, Okinawa. Sent to Naval Air Weapons Station China Lake in 1956 for use as a target. Recovered in 1975 by David Tallichet and Yesterday's Air Force. Transferred to March Field in 1981. From 1981 to 2003 wore the livery of 44-27263 "Mission Inn." From 2003 to 2022, it wore the markings of 44-61668 "Flagship 500" and "Three Feathers". Now restored in its original 457th Bomb Squadron markings of K 15.
44-61671		(United States) Knob Noster, Missouri	Whiteman AFB	Static display	Built at Boeing Renton as B-29A. Wears livery of 44–27353, "The Great Artiste", which flew as an observation aircraft during the bombing of Hiroshima and the bombing of Nagasaki.
44-61739		(United States) Warner Robins, Georgia	Museum of Aviation	Static display	Built at Boeing Renton as B-29A. This aircraft survives only as a nose section, recovered from the Aberdeen Proving Ground in Maryland.
44-61748		(United Kingdom) Duxford, Cambridgeshire	Imperial War Museum Duxford	Static display	Built at Boeing Renton as B-29A. Assigned to 371st Bombardment Squadron, 307th Bombardment Group, 307th Bombardment Wing at Kadena AB, Okinawa in March 1952. Named "It's Hawg Wild" by her crew. Flew 105 missions over North Korea. Sent to Naval Air Weapons Station China Lake in November 1956 to be used as a target. Recovered from China Lake in 1979 and donated to Imperial War Museum. Arrived in Duxford 2 March 1980.
44-61975		(United States) Windsor Locks, Connecticut	New England Air Museum	Static display	Built at Boeing Renton as B-29A. In 1956 sent to Aberdeen Proving Ground for use as a target. Recovered in 1973 by Bradley Air Museum. Damaged by a tornado in 1979. Wears livery of "Jack's Hack" (serial unknown).
44-62022		(United States) Pueblo, Colorado	Pueblo Weisbrod Aircraft Museum	Static display	Built at Boeing Renton as B-29A. Later sent to Naval Air Weapons Station China Lake for use as a target. Recovered in 1972. Wears livery of a B-29 piloted by Lt. Robert T. Haver and named "Peachy" (serial 44-62022).
44-62070		(United States) Dallas, Texas	Commemorative Air Force	Airworthy	Built at Boeing Renton as B-29A. Served as an administrative aircraft before being stored. Returned to service in 1953. Used until 1958, at which point it was sent to Naval Air Weapons Station China Lake for use as a ballistic missile target. Acquired by the Commemorative Air Force in 1971, then known as the Confederate Air Force, and flown to Harlingen, Texas that August. A restoration was completed in 1974 and the plane was named "FIFI " after Josephine O'Connor (1919-2007), the wife of Victor Neils Agather (1912-2000), who was instrumental in acquiring the plane. After being grounded in 2006, she returned to the air in 2010. Registered with the FAA as N529B.
44-62112		(United States) Chino, California	Aero Trader	In storage	Built at Boeing Renton as B-29A. One of four B-29s obtained by Disney from China Lake for use in the movie The Last Flight of Noah's Ark. The other three were: 44-62222 (reported destroyed off the coast of Hawaii), 44-70049 and 44–84084. Nose section only, now owned by Kermit Weeks and in storage at Aero Trader, Chino, California.
44-62139		(United States) Dayton, Ohio	National Museum of the United States Air Force	Static display	Built at Boeing Renton as B-29A. The walk-through B-29 fuselage is painted to represent 44-87657 "Command Decision" from 28th Bomb Squadron, 19th Bomb Group. The original "Command Decision" was named after a popular 1948 film about the difficult decisions and heavy casualties of bomber operations over Europe in World War II. It became famous for shooting down five MiG-15s, unofficially making it a bomber "Ace," and flew in 121 missions during the Korean War. It was . .
44-62220		(United States) San Antonio, Texas	Lackland AFB	Static display	Built at Boeing Renton as B-29A. Sent to Aberdeen Proving Ground in 1960 for use as a target. Recovered in 1985 and put on display at Kelly AFB. After Kelly's closure, moved to Lackland AFB. Wears livery of "Joltin' Josie the Pacific Pioneer".
44-69729		(United States) Seattle, Washington	Museum of Flight	Static display	Built at Boeing Wichita as B-29. Assigned to the 875th Bomb Squadron, 498th Bomb Group, 73d Bomb Wing and completed 37 bombing missions before it was converted to a KB-29 aerial refueling tanker in June 1949. In 1986 it was removed from the Naval Air Weapons Station China Lake, California and transported to the Lowry Heritage Museum at the then-Lowry Air Force Base, Colorado; now the Wings Over the Rockies Air and Space Museum. No. 54 went through its initial level of restoration in 1987 with museum volunteers and was readied for Lowry AFB's 50th anniversary and the 40th anniversary of the USAF on 2 October 1987. It was restored to its 1944 markings with the "T Square 54" on its vertical stabilizer. In 1995, the USAF Museum transferred T-Sq-54 to the Museum of Flight in Seattle, Washington. After another level of restoration and change in its markings, it was displayed again in 1996. She was shrink wrapped, 2011, in white plastic for 5 years and unwrapped on 6 Apr 2016 under the new open-side outdoor Pavilion.
44-69972		(United States) Wichita, Kansas	Doc's Friends	Airworthy	Built at Boeing Wichita as B-29. In 1951 converted to a radar calibration plane and was based at Griffiss Air Force Base with the 4713th Radar Evaluation Squadron. Squadron named planes after characters from Snow White and the Seven Dwarfs, and this plane acquired the name "Doc." B-29 number 44-70016 was also in this squadron. Struck off in 1956 and sent to Naval Air Weapons Station China Lake for use as a target. Removed in 1998 and restored at the Boeing plant in Wichita, Kansas where it was originally built. Moved in March 2007 to the Kansas Aviation Museum. In February 2013, the aircraft was acquired by the non-profit organization Doc's Friends. On 11 May 2016, the restoration crew performed the first of many low-speed taxi tests as the final preparations were underway before first flight. The plane received a certificate of airworthiness from the Federal Aviation Administration on May 20, 2016 allowing it be flown. On 17 July 2016, "Doc" flew for the first time since 1956, flown by members of "Fifi" flight crews. It is registered with FAA as N69972.
44-70016		(United States) Tucson, Arizona	Pima Air and Space Museum	Static display	Built at Boeing Wichita as B-29. Delivered to the USAAF 6 April 1945, and later assigned to the 330th Bombardment Group based out of North Field, Guam, for combat service. Assigned to the 330th's 458th Bombardment Squadron, it began to regularly fly on combat missions, and was later dubbed "Sentimental Journey." By the war's end, "Sentimental Journey" had flown a total of 30 Missions with the 458th, and was placed into storage. In March 1954, it was renamed "Dopey" and assigned to 4713th Radar Evaluation Squadron, at Griffiss Air Force Base in Rome, New York, flying radar defense evaluation flights until 1959. In June 1959, S/N 44-70016 was finally retired from the air force, and sent to Davis-Monthan Air Force Base in Tucson, Arizona for storage. Then, in 1969 the B-29 was donated to the National Museum of the U.S. Air Force (then the U.S. Air Force Museum), and later placed on loan to the Pima Air and Space Museum (then the Tucson Air Museum Foundation of Pima County).
44-70049		(United States) Ocotillo Wells, California	Aero Trader	In storage	Built at Boeing Wichita as B-29. One of four B-29s obtained by Disney from China Lake for use in the movie The Last Flight of Noah's Ark. The other three were: 44–62112, 44-62222 (reported destroyed off the coast of Hawaii) and 44–84084. Now owned by Kermit Weeks and in storage at Aero Trader, Ocotillo Wells, California.
44-70102		(United States) Ridgecrest, California	Naval Air Weapons Station China Lake	In storage	"Here's Hopin" was built at Boeing Wichita and flew in 25 combat missions while assigned with the 678th Bombardment Squadron of the 444th Bombardment Group out of West Field, Tinian. It was transferred to China Lake in 1960. This aircraft is not complete, having been stripped for parts to restore other B-29s recovered from China Lake.
44-70113		(United States) Marietta, Georgia	Dobbins ARB	Static display	Built at Boeing Wichita as B-29. Flew with the 883rd Bomb Squadron of the 500th Bombardment Group in the 73d Bombardment Wing of the 20th Air Force, and flew 27 bombing missions before the end of World War II, carrying the name "Marilyn Gay." This B-29 is credited with shooting down a confirmed three Japanese fighter planes, with 3 more probable fighter kills. After the end of the war, this B-29 was renamed "Hoof Hearted," and served in Great Britain before it was decommissioned in 1956 and sent to the Aberdeen Proving Ground in Maryland. In 1973, the B-29 was recovered by the now defunct Florence Air & Missile Museum in Florence, South Carolina for restoration. In 1994, the Marietta B-29 Association sponsored restoration and put it on display at Dobbins ARB, Georgia as "Sweet Eloise."
44-84053		(United States) Warner Robins, Georgia	Museum of Aviation	Static display	Built at Bell Atlanta as B-29B. In 1956 sent to Aberdeen Proving Ground for use as a target. Recovered in 1983 and put on display.
44-84076		(United States) Ashland, Nebraska	Strategic Air Command and Aerospace Museum	Static display	Built at Bell Atlanta as B-29. Delivered 4 August 1945 to Walker AAF. Used by multiple units throughout the United States until 1959. Struck off command in July 1959 and transferred to SAC Museum. Formerly displayed as "Man o' War." Recently restored and painted as "Lucky Lady."
44-84084		(United States) Ocotillo Wells, California	Aero Trader	In storage	Built at Bell Atlanta as B-29. Acquired by USAAF on 31 July 1945. In January 1950, it was assigned to Tinker AFB. Removed from service on 15 September 1954 and transferred to Naval Air Weapons Station China Lake. One of four B-29s obtained by Disney from China Lake for use in the movie The Last Flight of Noah's Ark. The other three were: 44–62112, 44-62222 (reported destroyed off the coast of Hawaii) and 44–70049. Parts of this aircraft were used to restore Raz'n Hell in the 1980s. The rest of this aircraft now sits in storage, owned by Aero Trader.
44-86292		(United States) Chantilly, Virginia	Steven F. Udvar-Hazy Center	Static display	Built at Martin Omaha as B-29 and modified to a Silverplate during production. While still on the assembly line, personally selected on 9 May 1945 by Colonel Paul W. Tibbets Jr. for use with the 509th Composite Group. Taken on strength 18 May, assigned to the 393d Bombardment Squadron and on 14 June flown by Robert A. Lewis to Wendover AAF. On 31 May flown to Guam for bomb-bay modification. On 6 July flown to North Field, Tinian. Flew training and combat missions during July. On 5 August Tibbets took command of the plane, and named it "Enola Gay" after his mother. The name was painted on that same day. On 6 August, accompanied by "The Great Artiste" and "Necessary Evil," "Enola Gay" dropped the Little Boy atomic bomb on Hiroshima. Returned to the US on 6 November and kept at Roswell AAF. In May 1946 sent to Kwajalein Atoll for atomic tests, but was not used. Returned to Fairfield-Suisin AAF. In August 1946 given to Smithsonian Institution. After being left outside for some time, dismantled and put in storage at Suitland, Maryland in 1961. Restoration began in December 1984 and was completed in December 2003.
44-86408		(United States) Ogden, Utah	Hill Aerospace Museum	Static display	Built at Martin Omaha as B-29. Used for air sampling during atomic tests in the Pacific. After being stationed at various bases across the US, sent to Dugway Proving Ground for chemical testing, and then abandoned. Recovered in 1983 and placed on display at Hill AFB. Originally displayed as "Hagarty's Hag", it is currently painted to resemble "Straight Flush".
44-87627		(United States) Bossier City, Louisiana	Barksdale Global Power Museum	Static display	Built at Boeing Wichita as TB-29. In 1956 sent to Aberdeen Proving Ground for use as a target. Recovered in 1985 and put on display.
44-87779		(United States) Rapid City, South Dakota	South Dakota Air and Space Museum	Static display	Built at Boeing Wichita as B-29. Sent to Naval Air Weapons Station China Lake in 1956 for use as a target. Recovered in 1985. Wears livery of "Legal Eagle II."
45-21739		(South Korea) Sachon, South Gyeongsang	KAI Aerospace Museum	Static display	Built at Boeing Wichita as B-29. Sent to Naval Air Weapons Station China Lake. Recovered in 1972 and sent to Seoul. Museum named the plane "Unification."
45-21748		(United States) Albuquerque, New Mexico	National Museum of Nuclear Science and History	Static display	"Duke of Albuquerque" was built at Boeing Wichita as TB-29. Served with 509th Bombardment Group from 1946 to 1947. Later used as a ground training aircraft at Chanute AFB. Put on display wearing livery of Enola Gay.
45-21787		(United States) Polk City, Florida	Fantasy of Flight	Dismantled and in storage	Built at Boeing Wichita as B-29. Delivered to USAAF in September 1945. Sold to USN in 1947. Later transferred to National Advisory Committee for Aeronautics where it acquired the name "Fertile Myrtle." Used to carry the Douglas D-558-II Skyrocket research aircraft. Donated to the American Air Museum in Oakland, California in 1969. Used in the flying sequences of the 1980 Walt Disney film The Last Flight of Noah's Ark. Sold to Kermit Weeks in 1984. In 1992 the plane was severely damaged when the Weeks Air Museum was wrecked during Hurricane Andrew. The forward fuselage has subsequently been restored and was on static display. Other parts in storage. Although not presently airworthy, it is registered with FAA as N29KW.

== Known wrecks ==
Serial	Location	Coordinates	History	Photo
42-24815	(Japan) Akizuma, Ōra District	36.283766°N 139.454089°E (approx.)	A B-29 nicknamed "Deaner Boy" was rammed by a Japanese fighter causing it to collide with another B-29 (42-24784) on 10 February 1945. Both planes crashed into the fields of Akizuma. The crash took the lives of all 11 crew members of Deaner Boy.	
42-24784	(Japan) Akizuma, Ōra District	36.283895°N 139.452664°E (approx.)	A B-29 nicknamed "Slick's Chicks" collided with a B-29 (42-24815) on 10 February 1945. Both planes crashed into the fields of Akizuma. The bomber had broken up into two pieces not far from each other, fuselage landing at a paddy field while the tail landed next to the Akizuma Bridge. The crash took the lives of all 12 crew members of Slick's Chicks.	
42-65287	(Puerto Rico) Aguadilla	18.438175°N 67.239733°W	Built at Martin Omaha as B-29. Assigned to 17th Bombardment Operational Training Wing (Very Heavy), 246th AAF Base Unit, Pratt Army Airfield, Kansas. Ditched near Aguadilla, Puerto Rico on 31 May 1945 due to engine failure following departure from nearby Borinquen Army Airfield. Ten crew members survived and three were killed.	
42-65348	(Japan) Mount Ōmine, Nara Prefecture		A B-29 assigned to the 869th Bombardent Squadron, 497th Bombardment Group crashed into Mount Ōmine after being hit in the plane's number 1 engine on 1 June 1945. The bomber successfully crash landed but the crew members were all executed by the Japanese. On 1 June 2007, one of the bomber's engine was recovered and placed inside the Tenkawa Village Museum.	
42-94052	(United States) Dugway Proving Ground, Utah	40.084606°N 113.332895°W	Built at Boeing Renton as B-29A. Assigned to 330th Bombardment Group (VH) based at North Field, Guam. Nicknamed "Star Dust" and "City of Terre Haute, IN". Later transferred to the Royal Air Force as Washington B.1 WF444 in 1950. Returned to the United States in 1953 for disposal, and subsequently flown to Dugway Proving Ground for use as a target, and then abandoned. Remains on bombing range, as of October 2023.	
44-61554	(Japan) Oyajiyama, Nishiusuki District	32.807629°N 131.339466°E (approx.)	A B-29 crashed into Sobo Mountain due to poor visibility on 30 August 1945. The crash took the lives of all 12 crew members of the bomber. A monument called "Prayer of Peace" has been erected on the mountain with remains of the planes scattered around it.	
44-61999	(United Kingdom) Higher Shelf Stones, Bleaklow	53.450559°N 1.864932°W	Built at Boeing Renton as B-29A. Nicknamed "Over-Exposed!" after photographing the Bikini Atoll atomic tests in 1946. On a 3 November 1948 flight from RAF Scampton to RAF Burtonwood, crashed near Higher Shelf Stones, Bleaklow, killing all 13 crew members.	
44-62134	(United States) China Lake, California	35.52444444°N 117.17055556°W	Built at Boeing Renton as B-29A. Later flown to Naval Air Weapons Station China Lake for use as a target, and subsequently abandoned. Still on bombing range, as of October 2023, and can be clearly seen in satellite imagery.	
44-62214	(United States) Fairbanks, Alaska	64.703131°N 147.126900°W	Built at Boeing Renton as B-29A. Submerged in a lake at Eielson AFB, south of Fairbanks, Alaska, where it was placed after being a "hangar queen" (1954) and having been cannibalized for parts. It was moved to its present location (possible between 1955 and 1956) and is believed to have been used for water ditching training exercises for aircrew members. 44-62214 is the first aircraft to detect a Soviet atomic detonation. It is not a wrecked aircraft inasmuch as it is an abandoned aircraft. Has acquired the nickname "Lady of the Lake."	
44-62276	(United Kingdom) Stob na Boine Druim-fhinn, Scotland	56.1763476°N 4.9639196°W	Delivered to the USAAF on 15 February 1946. Assigned to 31st Bomb Squadron, 301st Bomb Wing, Smoky Hill AFB, Kansas. On the morning of January 17, 1949, it took off from RAF Scampton in Lincolnshire, England, on a return trip to her airfield at Smoky Hill AFB with 20 passengers and crew on board. The crew were reported to be on leave, having previously been involved in the Berlin Airlift. The planned route was overland via Scotland, then on to Keflavik, Iceland, where they would stop to refuel and take on supplies. The weather was variable, and as it reached Strathclyde, falling temperatures and cloud began to cause icing of their wings and control surfaces. At 09:50, it crashed into the side of Stob na Boine Druim-fhinn, a hill in Succoth Glen, spreading wreckage in the valley between Stob na Boine and Beinn Tharsuinn. All 20 passengers and crew perished, with the aircraft being consumed by the resultant fire.	
44-69957	(United States) China Lake, California	35.90222222°N 117.72388889°W	Built at Boeing Wichita as B-29. Assigned to 499th Bombardment Group based at Isley Field, Saipan. Nicknamed "The Hot Number". Later flown to Naval Air Weapons Station China Lake and used as a target before being abandoned. Still on bombing range, as of February 2020, and can be clearly seen in satellite imagery.	
44-70039	(United States) Talkeetna, Alaska	61.85083333°N 149.13388889°W (approx.)	Built at Boeing Wichita as B-29. Crashed at Lynx Peak 15 November 1957. Four crew members were killed and six survived.	
44-83899	(Northern Mariana Islands) Mt. Tapochau, Saipan	15.188331°N 145.741161°E (approx.)	Built at Bell Atlanta as B-29B. Crashed near Mount Tapochau on Saipan 27 August 1945. All 10 crew members were killed on impact.	
44-84149	(United States) Talkeetna, Alaska	61.714050°N 149.506617°W	Built at Bell Atlanta as B-29B. Later converted to KB-29P. Crashed near Talkeetna on 26 December 1956. All 8 crew members were killed on impact.	
44-86333	(United States) Talihina, Oklahoma		Built at Martin Omaha as B-29. Assigned to 352nd Bombardment Squadron, 301st Bombardment Wing, Smoky Hill AFB, Kansas. The plane had an explosive decompression on 26 September 1949. All 13 crew members were killed in the crash. A memorial plaque is at the Talihina Chamber Visitors Center.	
44-86334	(United States) Marshall County, Kentucky	36.788899°N 88.429065°W	Built at Martin Omaha as B-29. Assigned to Combat Crew Training Squadron, 237th AAF Base Unit, Kirtland AAF, New Mexico. The plane had disintegrated mid-air and crashed at Soldier Creek. Only 1 out of the 10 crew survived the crash as he was thrown out of the aircraft with the tail section. A memorial is now erected on the crash site.	
45-21768	Greenland	80.262814°N 60.530831°W	Built at Boeing Wichita as B-29. Assigned to the 46th Reconnaissance Squadron based out of Ladd Army Airfield in Fairbanks, Alaska as part of Project Nanook in early 1946. Named "Kee Bird" by her crew. After crashing on a frozen lake in northwest Greenland on 21 February 1947 during a secret mission, it was abandoned almost intact in the arctic. In 1994, retired Lockheed test pilot Darryl Greenamyer led an expedition to recover the aircraft via repairing it on site and flying it out. The project was abandoned however after the B-29 caught fire and was severely damaged just prior to takeoff. It is currently sitting on the edge of a lake in far northwest Greenland. The attempt to rescue Kee Bird was the subject of a Nova episode entitled "B-29: Frozen in Time." The aircraft's remains are a protected site under Greenland's heritage laws, and claimed by the Greenland National Museum in Nuuk, Greenland.	
45-21847	(United States) Lake Mead, Nevada	36.272131°N 114.397675°W	Built at Boeing Wichita as B-29. Converted to B-29F electronic reconnaissance plane. On 21 July 1948 crashed in Lake Mead near Las Vegas, Nevada. Discovered intact in 2002 at a depth of 118 feet. In 2011 the plane was placed on the U.S. National Register of Historic Places. Although the plane is the most intact of the remaining known wrecks, no plans have been made to recover it. Private dive tours are permitted.	
45-21854	(United States) Manzano Mountains, New Mexico		A B-29 crashed into the Manzano Mountains which later led to a Broken Arrow incident as it was carrying a nuclear weapon during the accident on 11 April 1950. All 13 crew members were killed in the crash alongside the disintegration of the nuclear weapon. The wreckage still lies in pieces on the mountain. A marker was erected on the Manzano Mountains on 11 April 2019.	
Unknown	(Northern Mariana Islands) Tinian	15.069857°N 145.684423°E (approx.)	A sunken B-29 bomber was picked up by sonar from NOAA Ship Okeanos Explorer mapped around the north end of Tinian on 9 July 2016. A ROV, named Deep Discoverer was sent to inspect the wreck but with no luck identifying the bomber. There are sunken B-29s in the area including 42–65347, 42–98958, 44-27315 and many more.	
Unknown	(Northern Mariana Islands) Saipan	15.2443971°N 145.7233466°E (approx.)	Off Mañagaha Marine Conservation Area, a sunken B-29 bomber sits 8-12m on the sea bed which is now a popular diving location. No identifications were gathered from the aircraft.	
