= FIFI (aircraft) =

Airworthy Boeing B-29 Superfortress

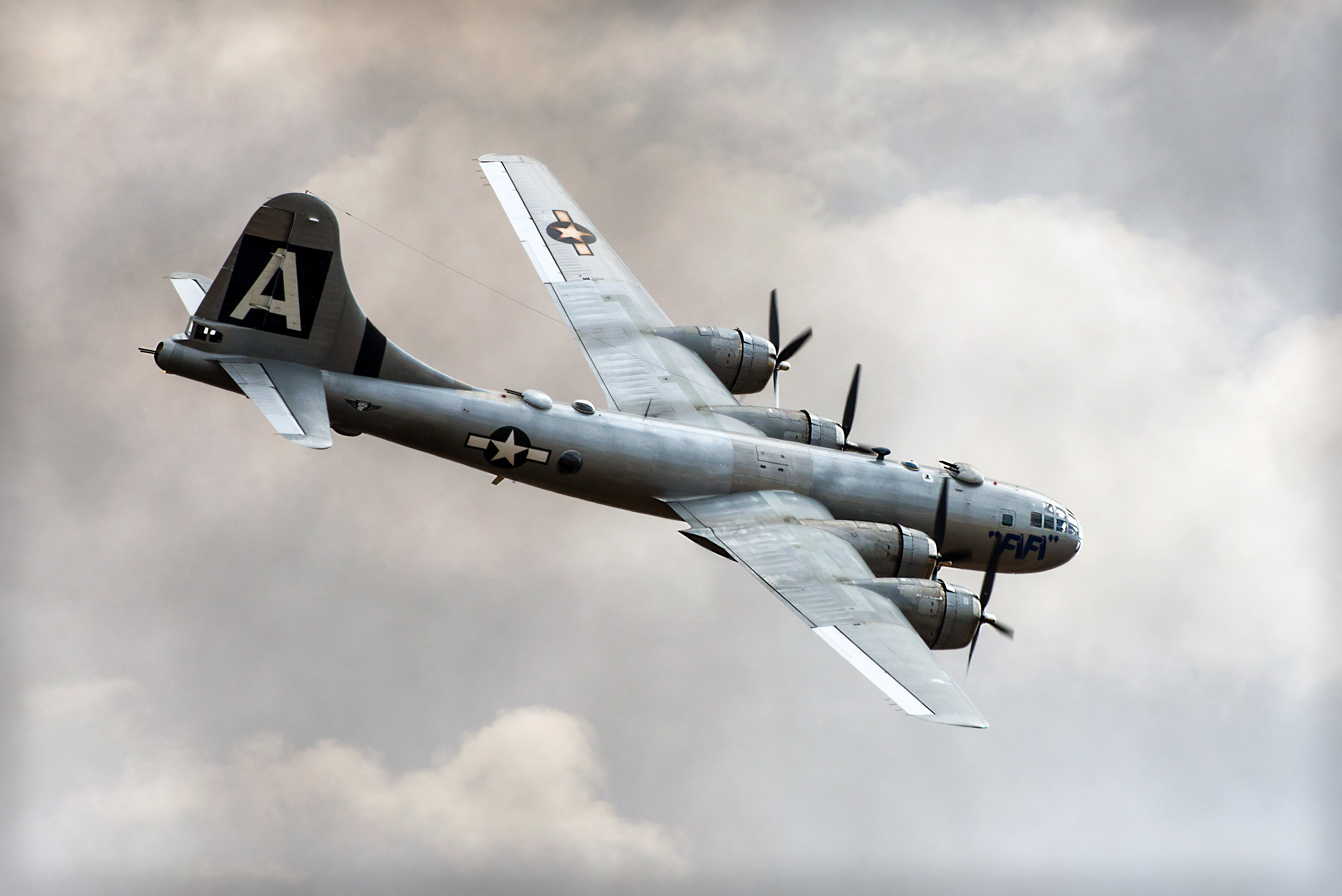
- FIFI in flight

General information
- Type: Boeing B-29A-60-BN Superfortress
- Manufacturer: Boeing
- Status: Airworthy
- Owners: Commemorative Air Force
- Construction number: 11547
- Registration: N529B
- Serial: 44-62070 USAAF

History
- Manufactured: 1945
- In service: 1945–1958, 1971–present
- Preserved at: Dallas, Texas

FIFI is a Boeing B-29 Superfortress. It is one of two B-29s in the world flying as of 2024 (with Doc being the other). It is owned by the Commemorative Air Force and is based at the Victor N. Agather Hangar at Dallas Executive Airport in Dallas, Texas.

FIFI tours the United States and Canada annually. It takes part in various air shows and offers rides.

== History ==
Built by Boeing at the Renton factory in Washington, B-29A serial number 44-62070 was delivered to the USAAF in Kansas in 1945. Modified to a TB-29A standard, it served as an administrative aircraft before being placed in "desert storage". It was returned to active duty in 1953.

The airplane was retired in 1958 and placed at the U.S. Navy Naval Weapons Center and bombing range at China Lake Naval Air Weapons Station in California as part of a group of 36 B-29s. The Commemorative Air Force, then known as the Confederate Air Force, acquired it in 1971 and registered it as a civilian aircraft. It was flown to CAF headquarters at Harlingen, Texas on 3 August 1971 and re-registered as N529B in August 1981.

== Commemorative Air Force ==
The CAF had been actively searching for a B-29 for their use. Through Vic Agather they had an agreement that should one be found that was owned by the government but not in use, it would be turned over to the CAF.

In 1971, a CAF pilot in the National Guard reported sighting a number of what might be B-29s on the California desert near China Lake. The CAF learned the aircraft were indeed Superfortresses that had been parked at a US Navy weapons center for 17 years. The aircraft had been used for gunnery targets and abused by heat, sand and vandals. After much negotiation (the US Air Force owned the aircraft; the Navy had to agree to release one), much paperwork and a painstaking search for the best survivor, the CAF became the owner of s/n 44-62070, officially acquiring a title on 23 March 1971, registering it as N4249.

A CAF maintenance team arrived at China Lake on 31 March 1971 and in only nine weeks, with the help of more CAF volunteers, they restored all systems and replaced fuel, oil and hydraulic hoses. The restoration process involved cannibalizing parts from other B-29s at China Lake, installing instruments, having new window bubbles made and restoring controls to working order. After the CAF technicians ran the engines, tested propellers and landing gear, N4249 was made ready to fly again by 3 August 1971. They had a permit to make a single ferry flight out of China Lake, although once it landed, the B-29 would be grounded.

The ferry crew took on enough fuel to fly non-stop 1,250 miles to CAF Headquarters, then in Harlingen, Texas, lifted off at 7:48 a.m. and in a six-hour, 38-minute flight, brought home the last flying B-29 Superfortress without incident. The complete restoration to CAF standards of airworthiness was a long and expensive project involving more than three years of fund raising and hard work. Late in 1974, the CAF's B-29 was christened FIFI and joined the other World War II fighters and bombers to continue the CAF mandate "to preserve the memories and teach of lessons of mankind's greatest war."

Besides air displays, FIFI has appeared in several films, including Enola Gay: The Men, The Mission, and the Atomic Bomb (1980), Roswell (1994), and The Right Stuff (1983), standing in for the Bell X-1's "mothership". FIFI was also featured in "Fifi", season 2 episode 8 of the AMC series Better Call Saul.

=== Air show career ===
Throughout the years of air displays across the country, the CAF and the many volunteers kept FIFI in the air. In 2006, however, following a series of engine problems, including engine failure occurring during an airshow, the B-29/B-24 Squadron chose to ground the aircraft until more reliable engines could be fitted. In a joint press release, dated 21 January 2008, the Commemorative Air Force and the Cavanaugh Flight Museum announced a pledge of $1.2 million to re-engine FIFI.

Over the next three plus years, the original Wright R-3350-57AM engines were exchanged for new engines built using parts from later model engines that powered the Douglas A-1 Skyraider and Fairchild C-119 Flying Boxcar during the Vietnam War, a custom built combination of the Wright R-3350-95W and Wright R-3350-26WD engines.

After the $3,000,000 restoration project was completed, FIFI was flown for the first time in several years on 5 August 2010. In 2010, "FIFI" was pronounced once again ready to perform at airshows and in feature films and documentaries throughout the Western Hemisphere. FIFI, and Ol' 927 until 2013, were based in Addison, Texas, at the Cavanaugh Flight Museum, the facilities owned by Jim Cavanaugh, a major donor and supporter of FIFI. Since 2013, FIFI was relocated to the Vintage Flying Museum, Meacham International Airport, Fort Worth, Texas.

On 26 March 2021, FIFI made her first appearance at her new home during the CAF's Ribbon Cutting Ceremony of the Henry B. Tippie National Aviation Education Center (NAEC) at Dallas Executive Airport (KRBD).

== Photos ==
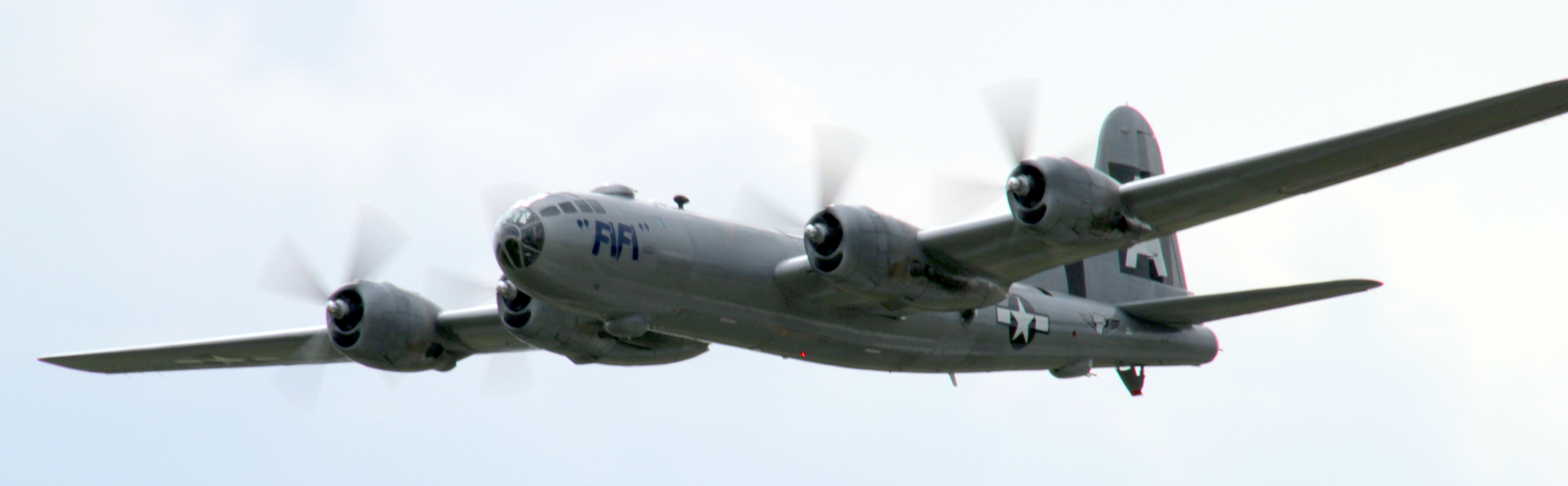
B-29 "FIFI" in flight at the World War II Weekend in Reading, Pennsylvania, 4 June 2011.

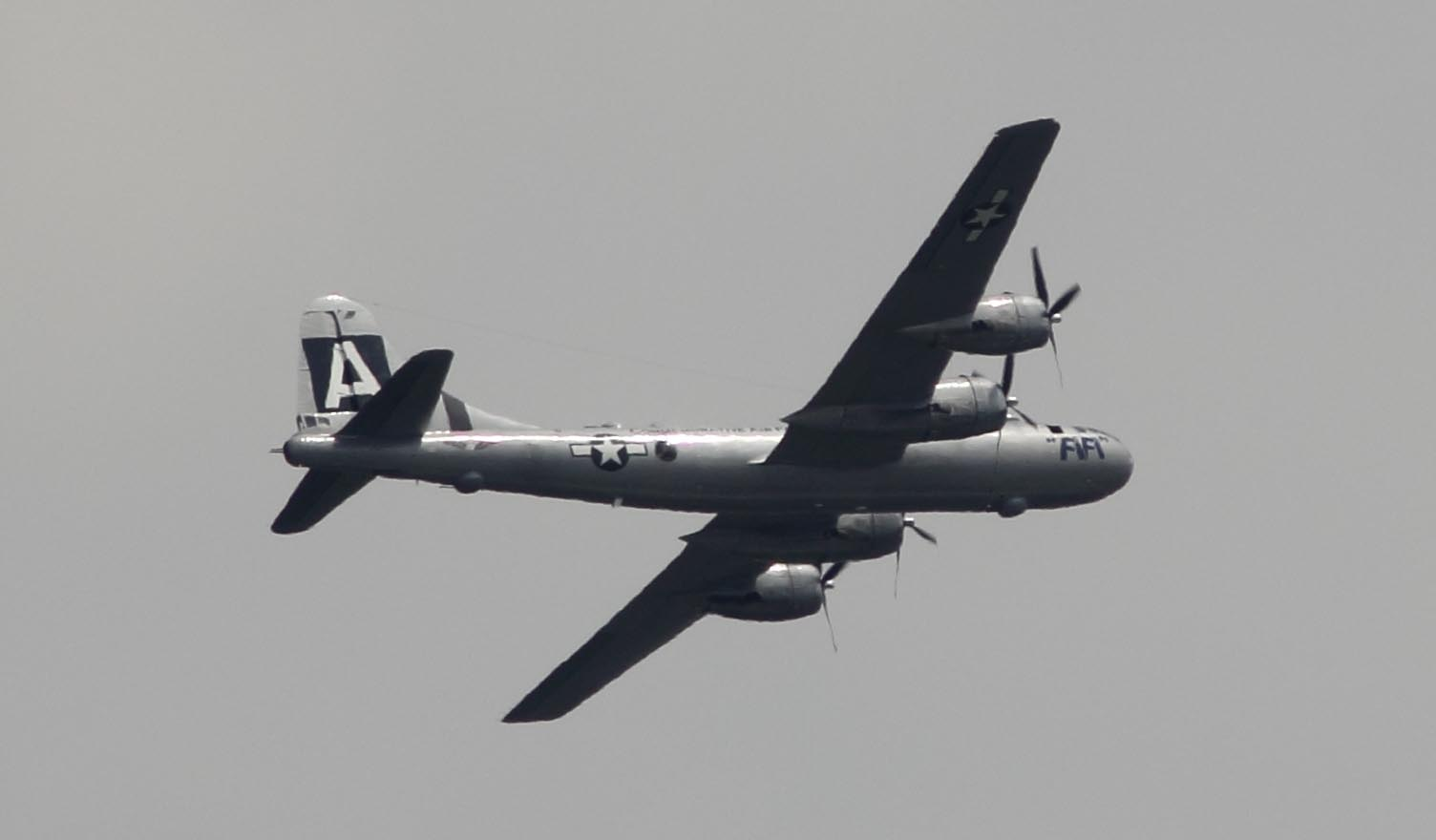
FIFI from the DC Flyover, 5/8/2015.

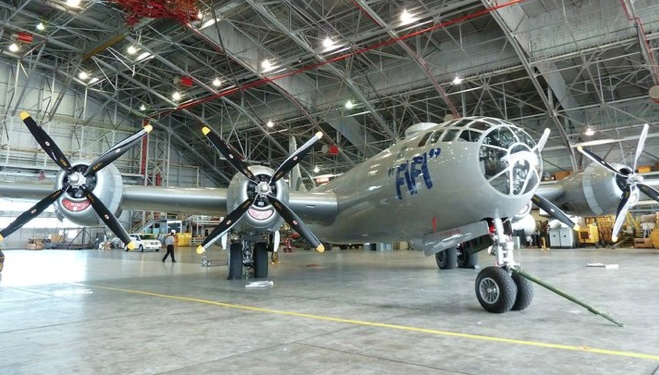
During the 2011 air show season, FIFI spent a few days in the NASA Langley hangar, avoiding storms

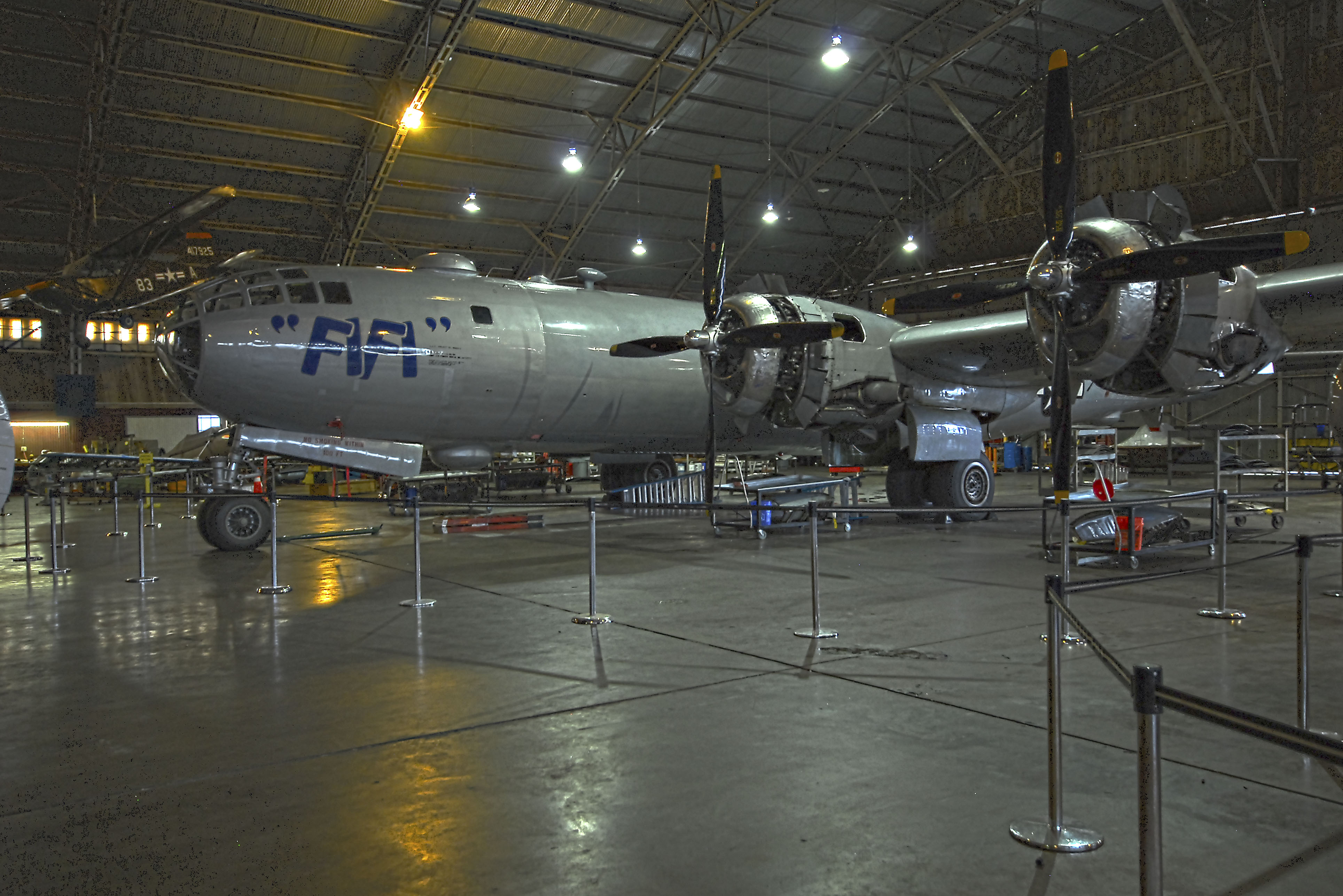
FIFI undergoing maintenance at the Vintage Flying Museum at Fort Worth Meacham International Airport in October of 2015

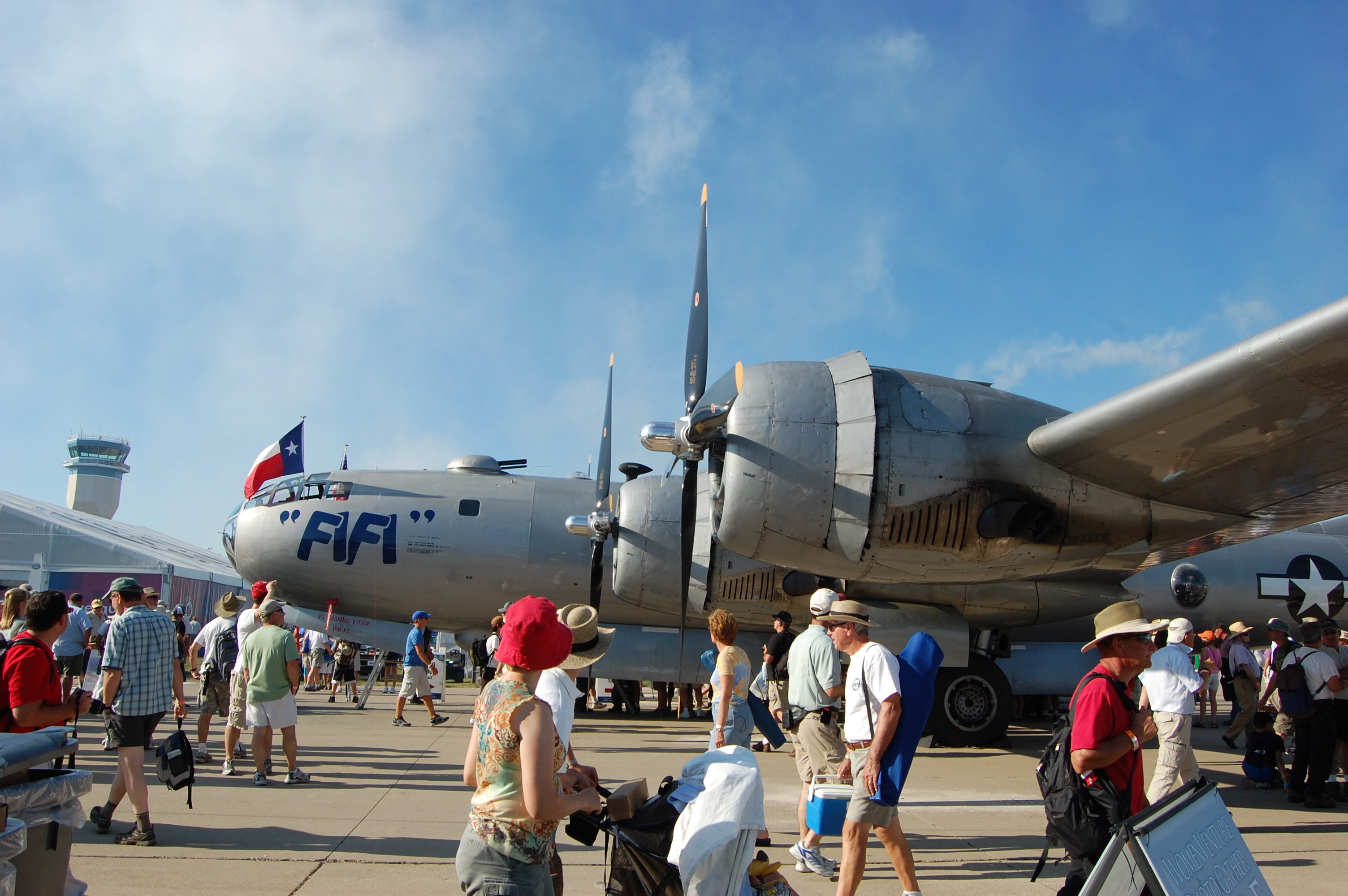
FIFI, as seen at EAA AirVenture 2011

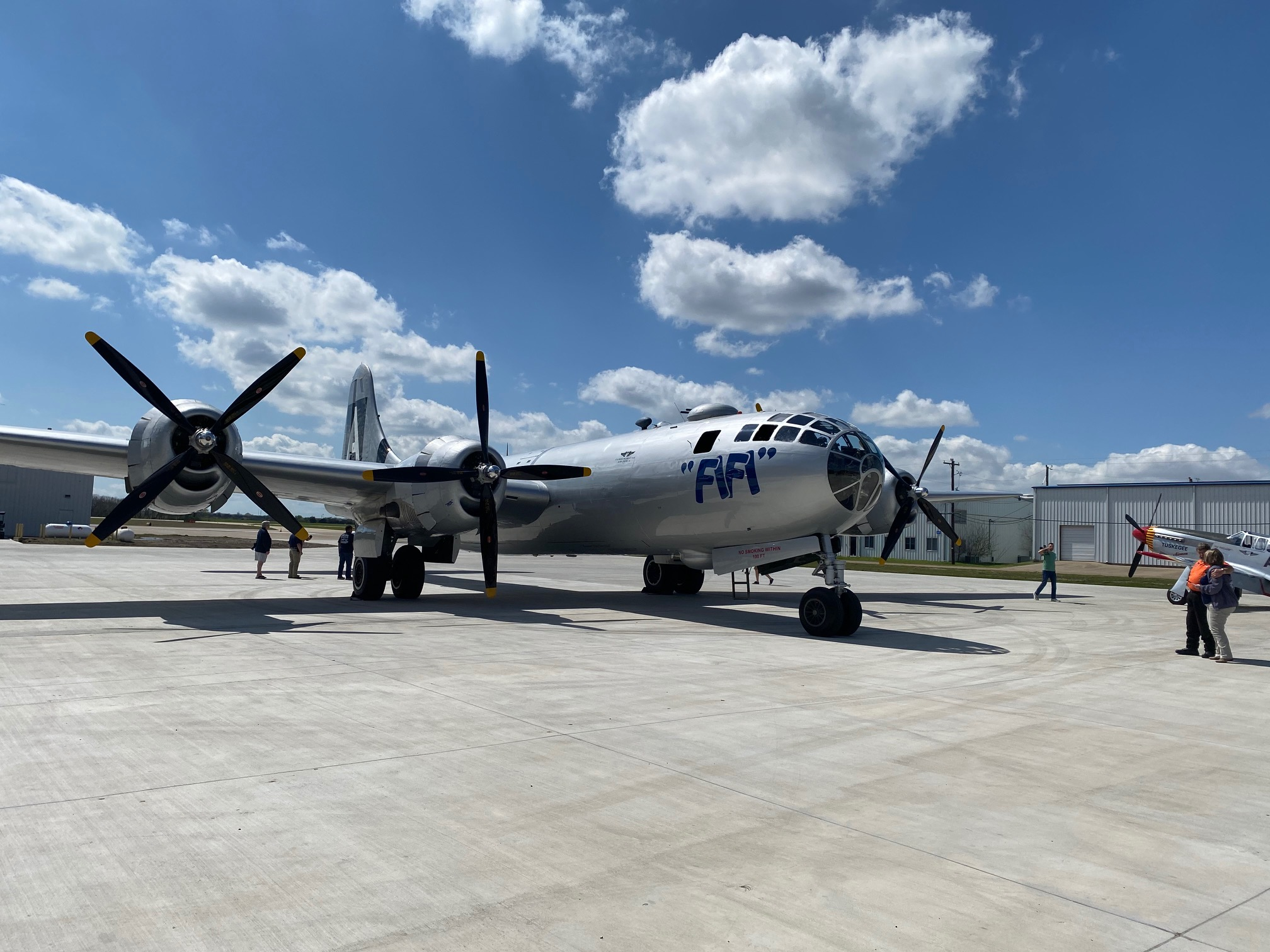
At CAF National Airbase in Dallas, Texas

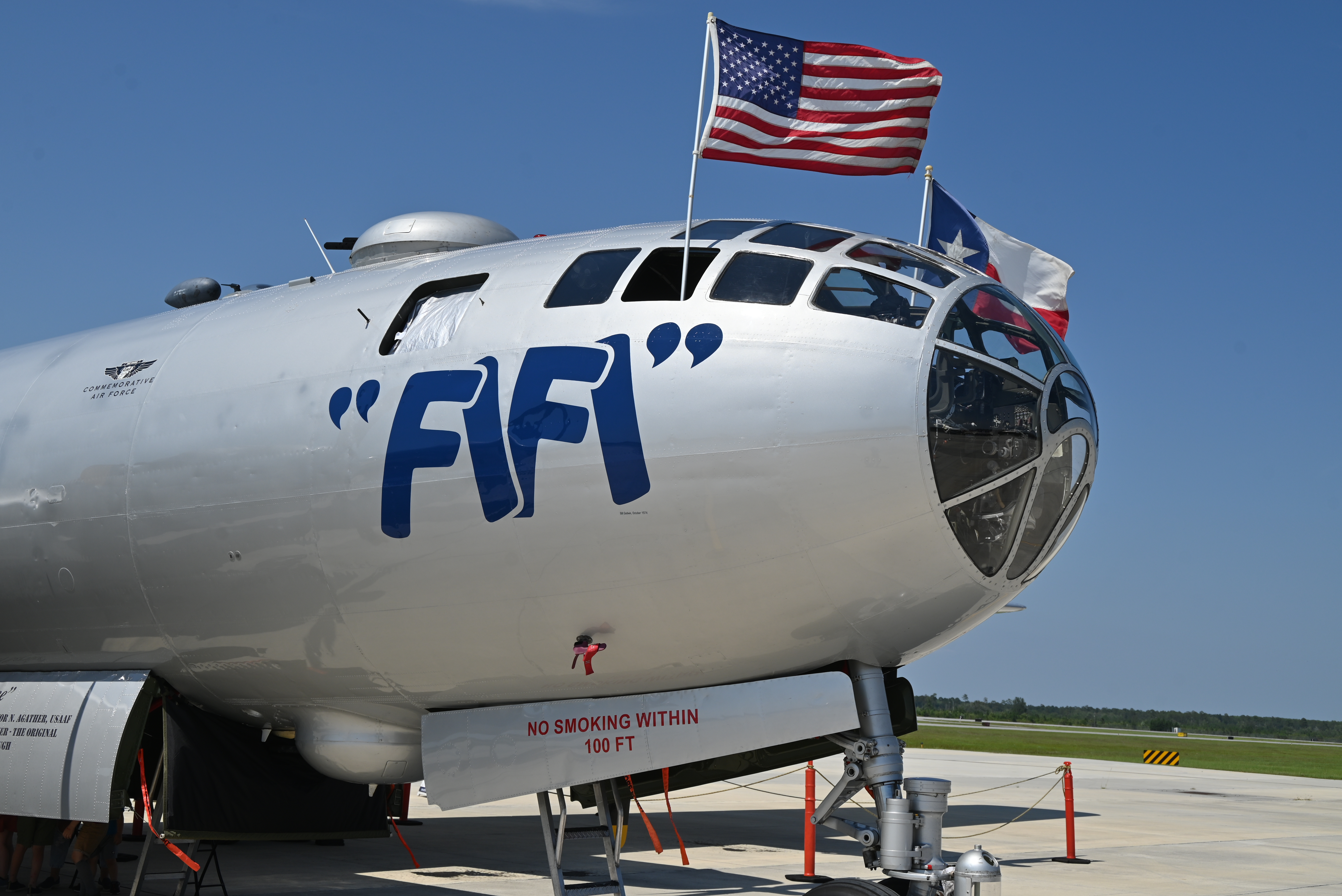
FIFI's nose

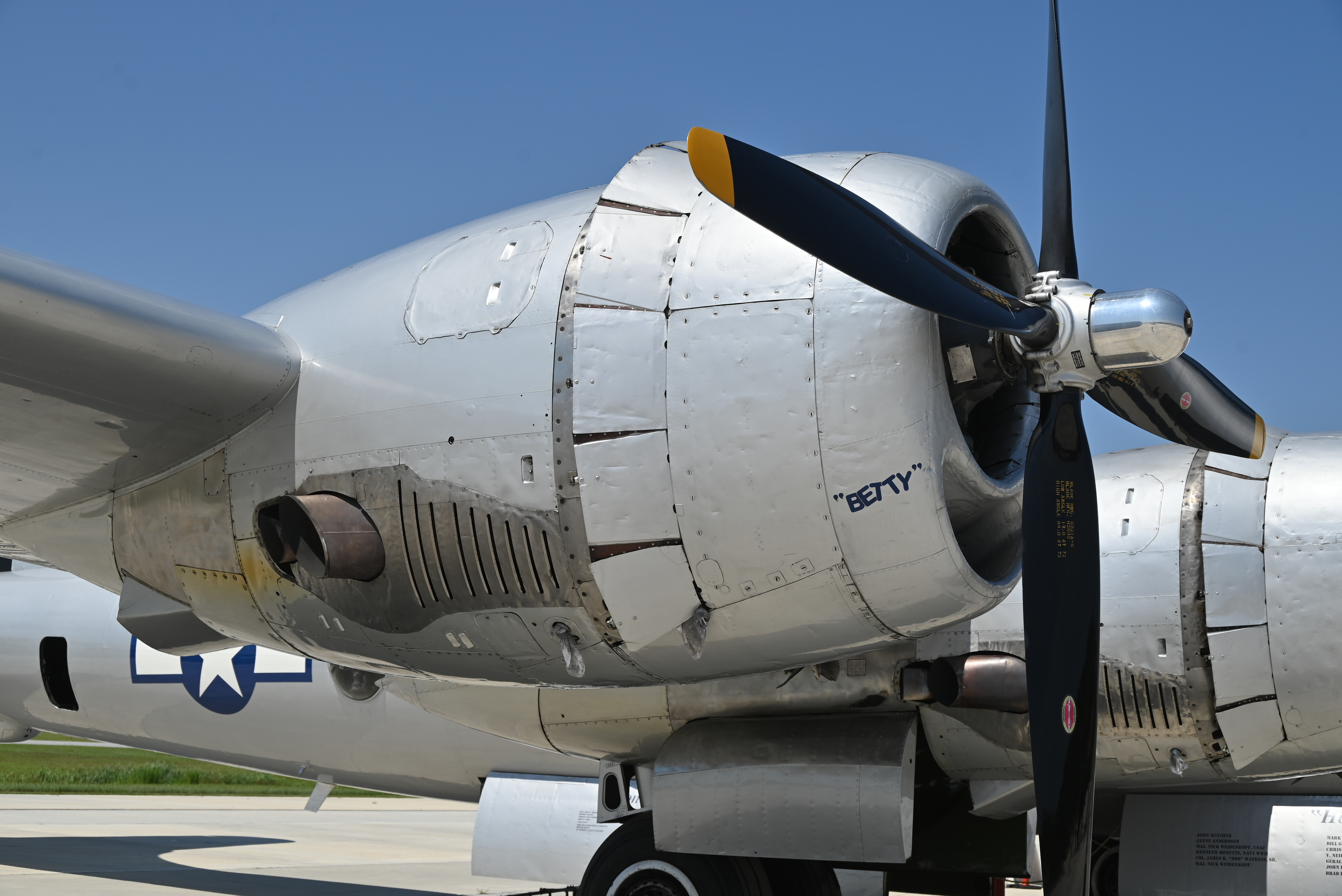
Engine

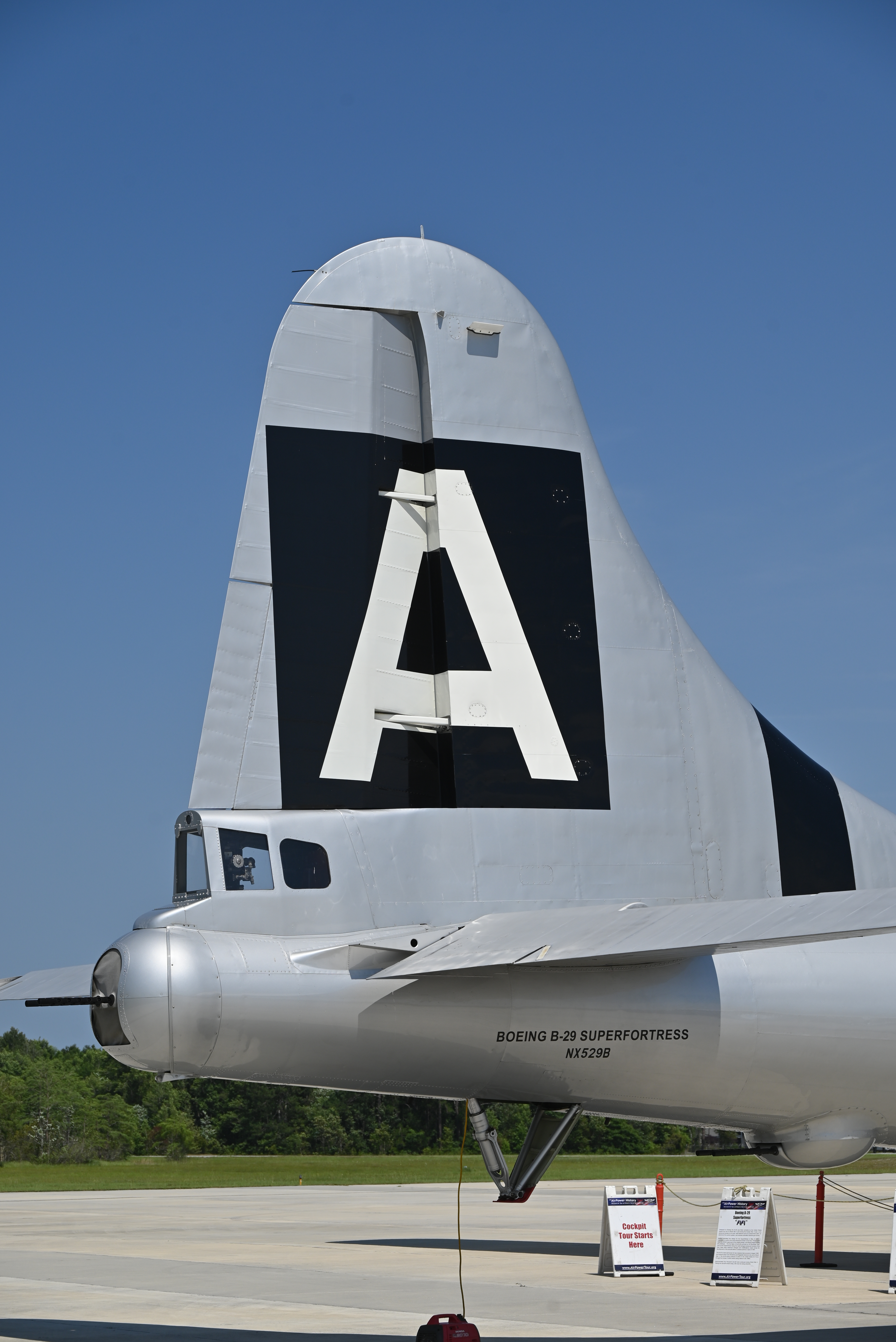
Tail

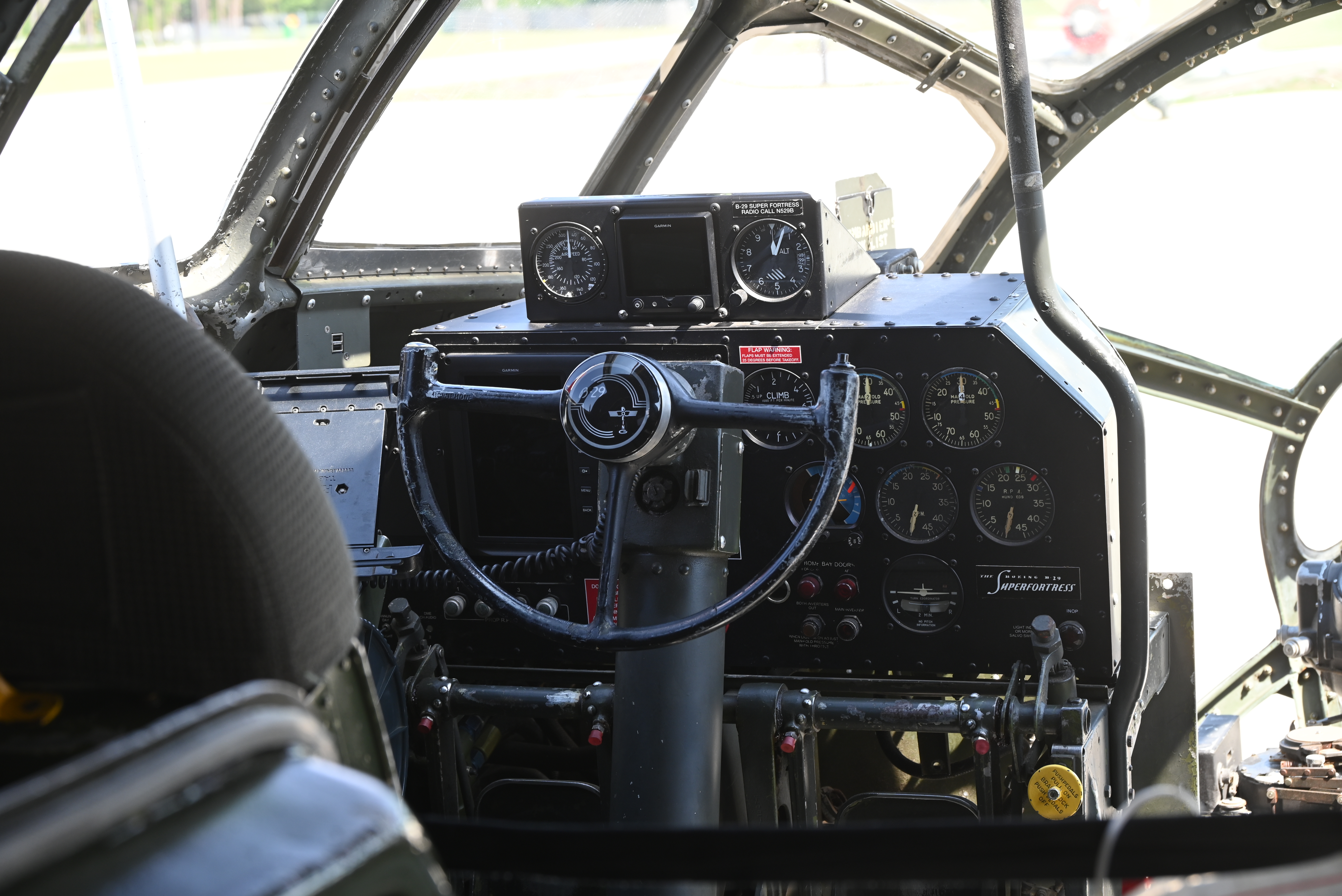
Cockpit

== See also ==
- List of surviving B-29 Superfortresses
