= Doc (aircraft) =

One of two currently flying Boeing B-29 Superfortress bombers

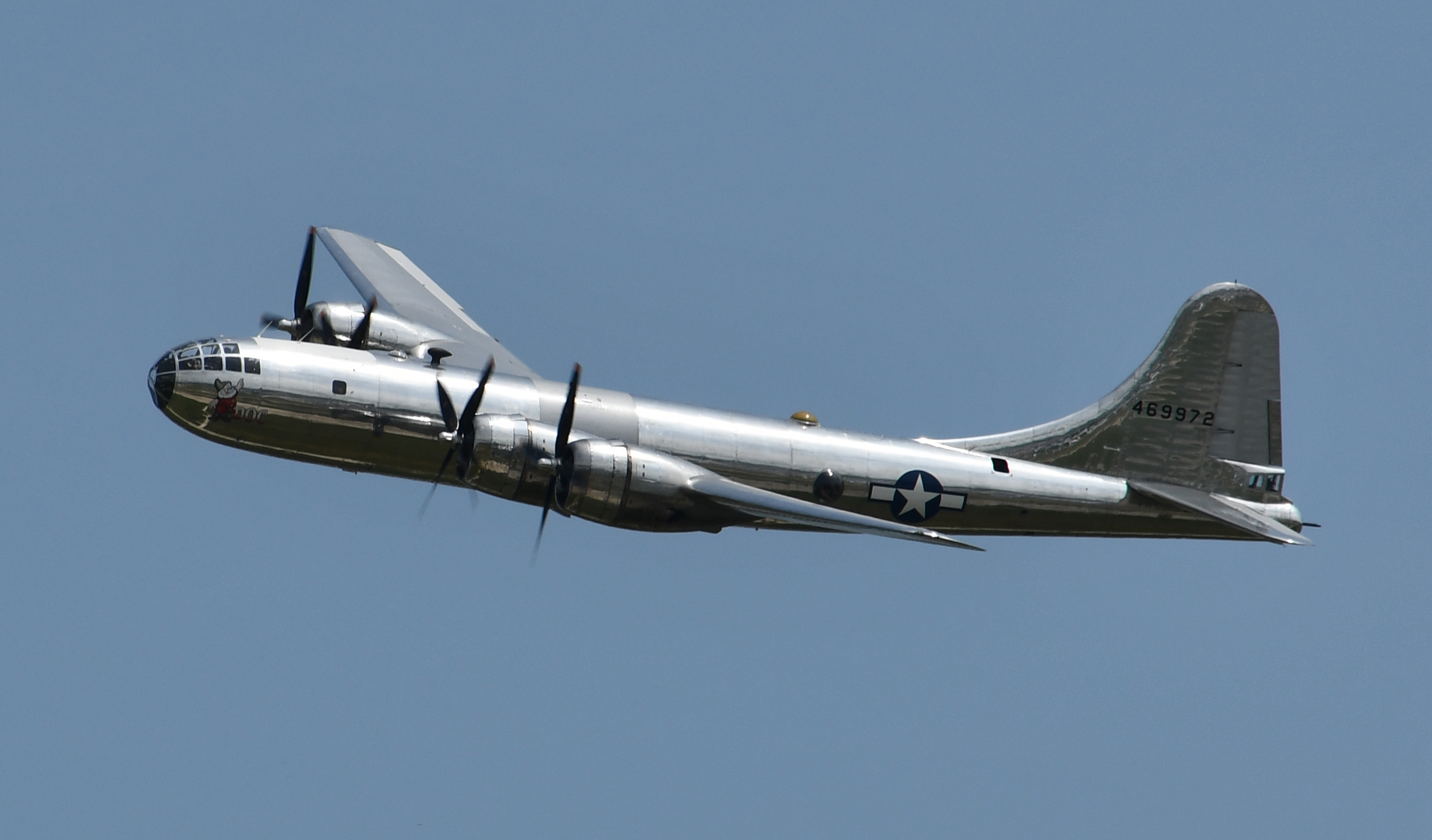
- Doc flying at EAA AirVenture Oshkosh in 2019

General information
- Type: Boeing B-29-70-BW Superfortress
- Manufacturer: Boeing
- Status: Airworthy
- Owners: United States Army Air Forces; United States Air Force; United States Aviation Museum; Doc's Friends, Inc.
- Registration: N69972
- Serial: 44-69972 United States Army Air Forces

History
- Manufactured: 1944
- In service: 1945–1956

Doc is a Boeing B-29 Superfortress. It is one of two that are flying in the world (the other B-29 being FIFI). It is owned by Doc's Friends, Inc., a non-profit organization based in Wichita, Kansas, United States.

Doc attends various air shows and offers rides.

== Military career ==
The B-29 was built in 1944 as part of a production run of 1,620 aircraft built by Boeing at Wichita, Kansas, and allocated the military Serial Number 44-69972. It was delivered to the United States Army Air Forces in March 1945. The aircraft did not see combat and was converted to a radar calibration aircraft in 1951 and based at Griffiss Air Force Base, New York. While based at Griffiss, the squadron's members named their B-29s after characters in the Disney movie Snow White and the Seven Dwarfs, and 44-69972 became Doc. In 1955, the aircraft, modified as a TB-29, was moved to Yuma County Airport in Arizona to be used as a target tug. Retired from the United States Air Force in 1956, it was sent to the Naval Air Weapons Station China Lake for use as a ballistic missile target.

== Restoration ==
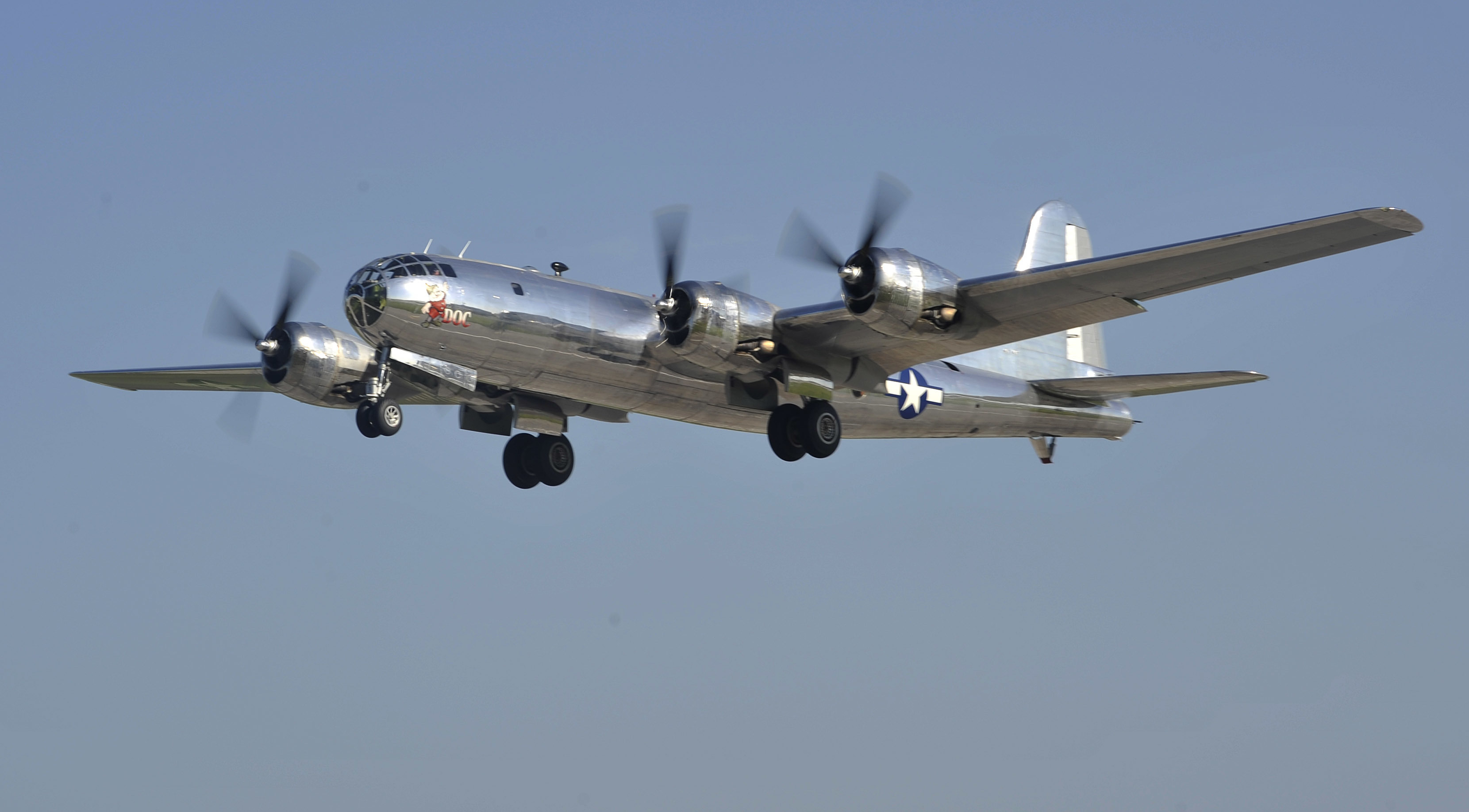
Doc over McConnell Air Force Base, Kansas, on July 17, 2016

Preparations to return Doc to flight began in 1987 under the direction of Tony Mazzolini, an Air Force veteran who later worked for Continental Airlines. After inquiring about the possibility of acquiring the bomber, the Navy agreed to release the aircraft under the condition that Mazzolini provide a restored B-25 Mitchell medium bomber in exchange, to supplement the collection of the National Naval Aviation Museum. After locating a suitable aircraft in South America and restoring it to the Navy's satisfaction, the transfer was ultimately completed in 1998. Doc was then towed to the nearby Inyokern Airport, where it was dismantled for transport to Wichita for restoration.

The airframe was acquired by the United States Aviation Museum of Cleveland, Ohio, for restoration to flight status. After extensive restoration work at the Boeing plant in Wichita, Kansas, where it was originally built, the aircraft was moved in March 2007 to the Kansas Aviation Museum. In February 2013, the aircraft was acquired by the non-profit organization "Doc's Friends". As of June 2014, all four overhauled engines and propellers had been reinstalled, a spokesperson for the group stating at that time that the aircraft would be airborne by the end the year. This timetable was not achieved, with the aircraft being towed out of the workshop for the first time on March 23, 2015. A few months after the rollout, the first post-restoration flight was anticipated to take place by the end of the year. At 8 a.m. on September 18, 2015, Doc successfully completed its first engine starts and testing of all four engines in Wichita. On May 11, 2016, the restoration crew performed the first of many low-speed taxi tests as the final preparations for the post-restoration flight began. This marked the first time since 1956 that the B-29 moved under its own power. Doc traveled more than a half mile during the taxi test and the crew was able to successfully test the brakes and steering. The aircraft received a certificate of airworthiness from the Federal Aviation Administration on May 20, 2016, allowing it to be flown.

On July 17, 2016, the aircraft flew for the first time since 1956, piloted by members of FIFI's flight crews. Take off was delayed due to issues with the forward bomb bay doors latching shut, and the flight was conducted with the undercarriage down. The event was livestreamed on YouTube and the Doc's Friends website.

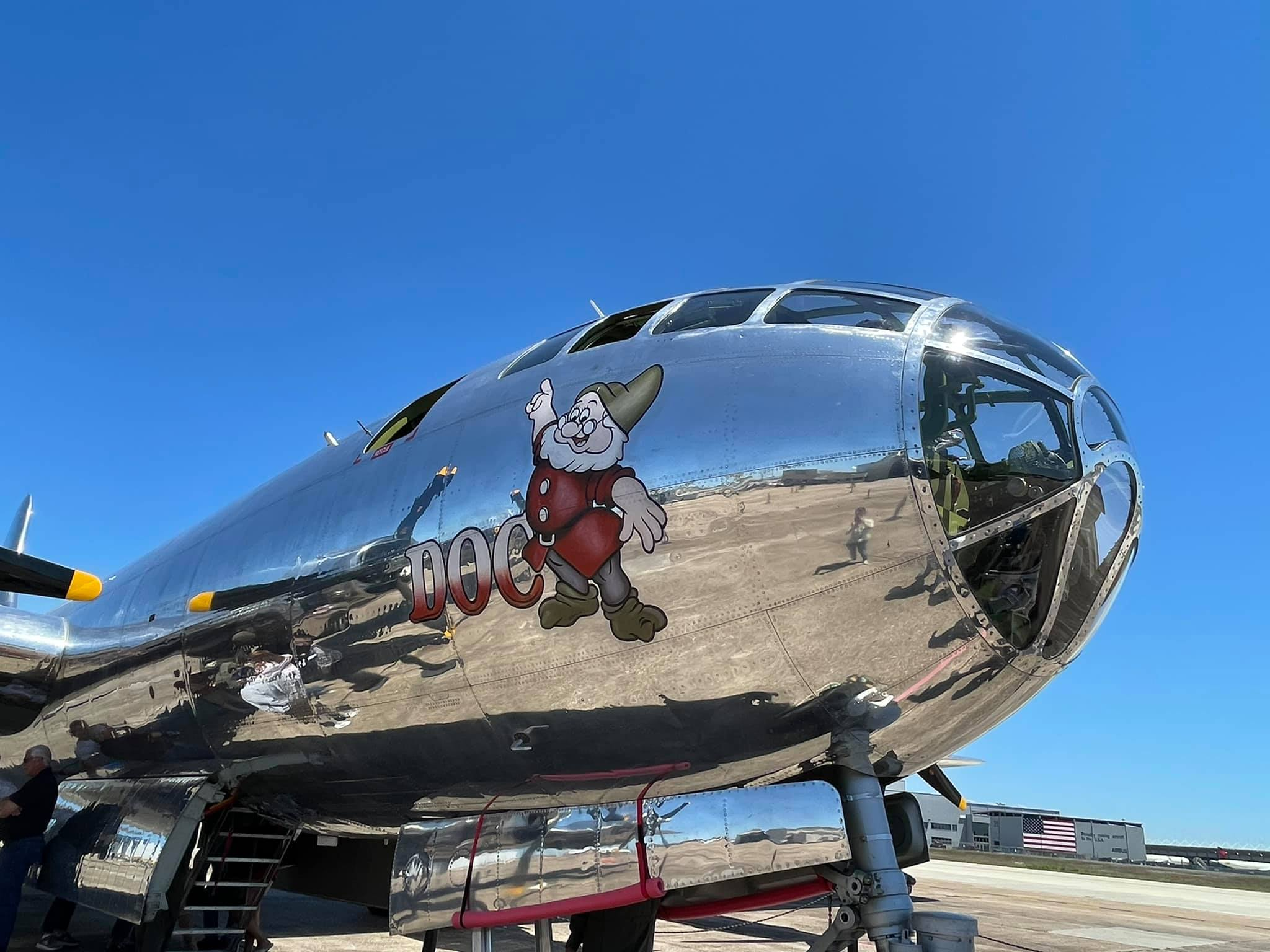
The nose art for Doc

Doc participated in its first airshow since the restoration, the Defenders of Liberty Airshow, on May 6 and 7, 2017, at Barksdale Air Force Base near Shreveport, Louisiana. Two months later, it participated in EAA AirVenture Oshkosh with the only other flying B-29, FIFI.

== See also ==
- List of surviving B-29 Superfortresses
