= United States Air Force Plant 4 =

Aerospace facility in Texas, US

- Part of Air Force Materiel Command (AFMC)
- 1 Lockheed Boulevard, White Settlement, Texas 76108
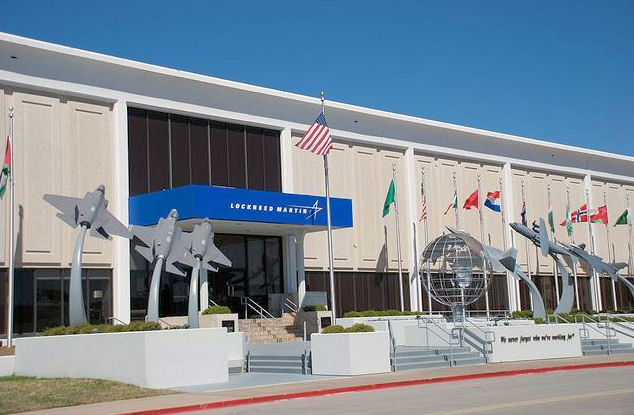
- United States Air Force Plant 4

Site information
- Type: United States Government manufacturing facility
- Owner: United States Air Force
- Controlled by: Air Force Materiel Command

Location
- Location within Texas
- Coordinates: 32°46′20″N 097°26′59″W

Site history
- Built: 1941
- In use: 1942-Present

Garrison information
- Occupants: Air Force Materiel Command

Air Force Plant 4 is a government-owned, contractor-operated aerospace facility in Fort Worth, Texas, currently owned by the U.S. Air Force and operated by Lockheed Martin Aeronautics. It is home to the F-16 and F-35 fighter aircraft. Military aircraft have been manufactured at the plant since 1942. Plant 4 is next to Naval Air Station Joint Reserve Base Fort Worth, formerly Carswell Air Force Base.

== Overview ==
With a staff of about 17,000 people, Air Force Plant 4 is one of the largest employers in the Dallas-Fort Worth-Arlington Metropolitan Statistical Area.

== History ==
In May 1940, as the Army Air Corps began planning a massive expansion, the Fort Worth Chamber of Commerce was trying to convince aircraft manufacturers to build an aircraft assembly plant in the Fort Worth area.

Fleet and Consolidated Aircraft, which wanted to build a heavy bomber plant in Fort Worth, suggested to the Air Corps that they jointly build an airfield next to the factory. Local officials promised to spend money to build an airport on the land next to the plant and lease it to the Air Corps. After some objections to this, another suggestion to deed the Air Corps the land was accepted, and on 16 June 1941, President Franklin D. Roosevelt approved $1.75 million to construct a military airfield (Fort Worth Army Airfield) next to the Consolidated manufacturing plant.

=== World War II ===
The B-24 Liberator was first proposed to the Air Corps in 1938, and with the start of World War II in Europe, the French government placed an order for 60 aircraft, sight unseen. In 1940, Britain ordered 164. These large foreign orders were placed well before the U.S. military placed similar-sized orders, and helped to get the B-24 project going.

To meet the projected demand for the B-24, in early 1941 the U.S. government established the Liberator Production Pool Program. Under this program, Consolidated would produce Liberators at the new plant in Fort Worth to supplement the B-24 production in its main San Diego plant. Sub-assemblies and components of B-24Ds would first be sent to Fort Worth and assembled from smaller plants until Fort Worth could produce the complete aircraft. Three designations of the Liberator, B-24D, B-24E, and B-24G would be flown to Fort Worth from Consolidated production lines in San Diego, Willow Run, Michigan and North American Aircraft in Dallas. At Fort Worth, the aircraft would be processed through what was called a "modification center" where the aircraft would be updated with the latest modifications before being turned over to the Air Force and flown out from the Fort Worth Army Airfield, which it shared a common airfield with. Over 3,000 B-24 aircraft were manufactured, assembled and modified during the war.

In February 1943, the Army directed Consolidated to shift its production of the B-32 Dominator very heavy bomber from San Diego to Fort Worth, to streamline PBY Catalina production in San Diego for the Navy. The B-32 program, however, was beset with technical problems and by the end of December 1944, only five aircraft had been delivered. In comparison, the B-29 Superfortress had been in combat for nearly six months. Before the program's termination in September 1945, only 124 B-32s were produced in Fort Worth.

=== Cold War ===
In 1942, Consolidated decided to manufacture its very long range bomber, the XB-36 Peacemaker, in Fort Worth. Although the USAAF approved this plan, it caused a delay of several months in the XB-36 project; since all the drawings, the mockup, the engineers, and the tooling had to be moved from San Diego to Texas. Unfortunately, progress on the XB-36 was still slow, and by the middle of 1944, B-29s were attacking Japan regularly from bases in the Mariana Islands. Although the B-36 project would still continue, it would now do so with a lower priority. Following the surrender of Germany and the end of the war in Europe, aircraft production contracts were drastically cut back. However, the contract for the B-36 was untouched. The enormous losses suffered in seizing island bases in the Pacific convinced the USAAF that there was still a definite need for a very long-range bomber.

The first XB-36 (42-13570) was rolled out of the Fort Worth factory on 8 September 1945, and took off from Fort Worth on its maiden flight on 8 August 1946. The B-36 was in production at Fort Worth until the last B-36J was rolled out on 14 August 1954; 385 of these were ultimately built.

Consolidated Aircraft became Convair, following a merger in 1943. Convair was itself acquired by General Dynamics in 1953.

Beginning in the late 1940s, Air Materiel Command, requested that work begin on a new jet- powered medium bomber that would be ready for service by the late 1950s. After years of development, a medium jet bomber Convair's XB-58, was accepted by the Air Force in December 1955 for thirteen aircraft, which would be built at Plant 4 in Fort Worth. Technical problems and testing by Air Force Systems Command meant that the first production aircraft were not delivered until 1959. The aircraft remained in production until 1964 when the Air Force decided to phase the aircraft out of the inventory.

The company's proposal for the Tactical Fighter Experimental project (TFX) was accepted in 1962, with the fighter seeing production as the General Dynamics F-111. By 1966, the plant had expanded to 4.7 million square feet, and by 1968 it had expanded further to 6.5 million square feet, to accommodate production of the F-111. Plant 4 built 562 of the aircraft by the time production ended, in 1976.

In the early 1970s, the YF-16 was designed and built at Fort Worth, and the USAF accepted its first F-16 on August 17, 1978. The Fighting Falcon is one of the most successful military aircraft ever produced, with major production continuing until the early 2000s and support components of the aircraft still being produced.

=== Current use ===
When General Dynamics sold its aircraft manufacturing interests to Lockheed Martin it included the operation of Plant 4, which eventually would house Lockheed Martin Aeronautics' divisional headquarters. As of the end of the Cold War, the plant was fabricating, assembling, and testing the F-16 for the USAF and many allied nations. The last of 3,620 F-16s was built there in late 2017 after more than 39 years and then production moved to another factory in Greenville, South Carolina. In March 1992 Lockheed began to produce F-22 Raptor aircraft components at the facility. Additionally, the plant produces spare aircraft parts, radar units, and missile components.

Today the F-35 Lightning II Joint Strike Fighter is being produced on the assembly line at the plant.

=== Pollution ===
Air Force Plant 4 has been listed as a Superfund site since 1990. It was discovered a significant trichloroethylene plume had contaminated local soil and groundwater. Remediation efforts are still underway.

== Gallery ==
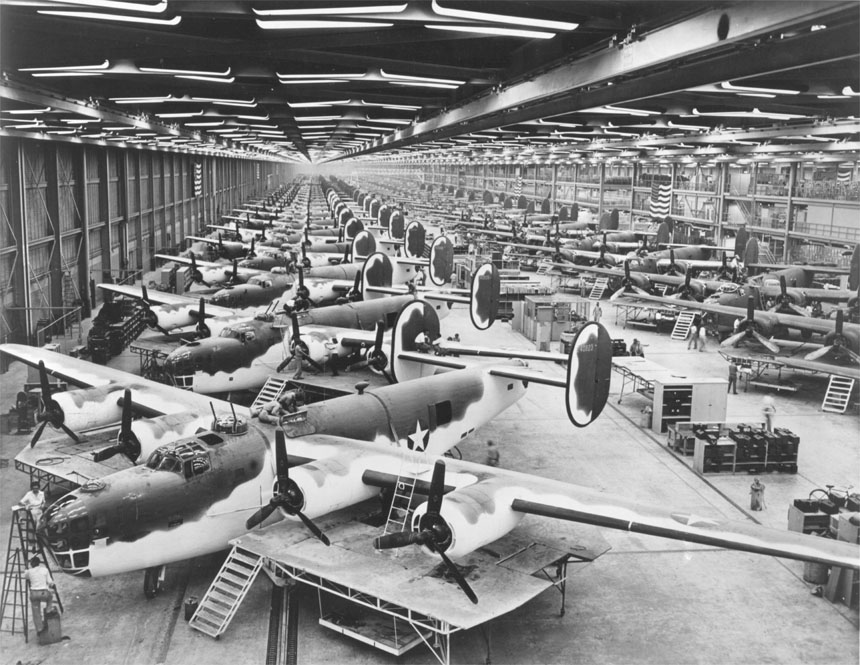
B-24s & C-87s 1943

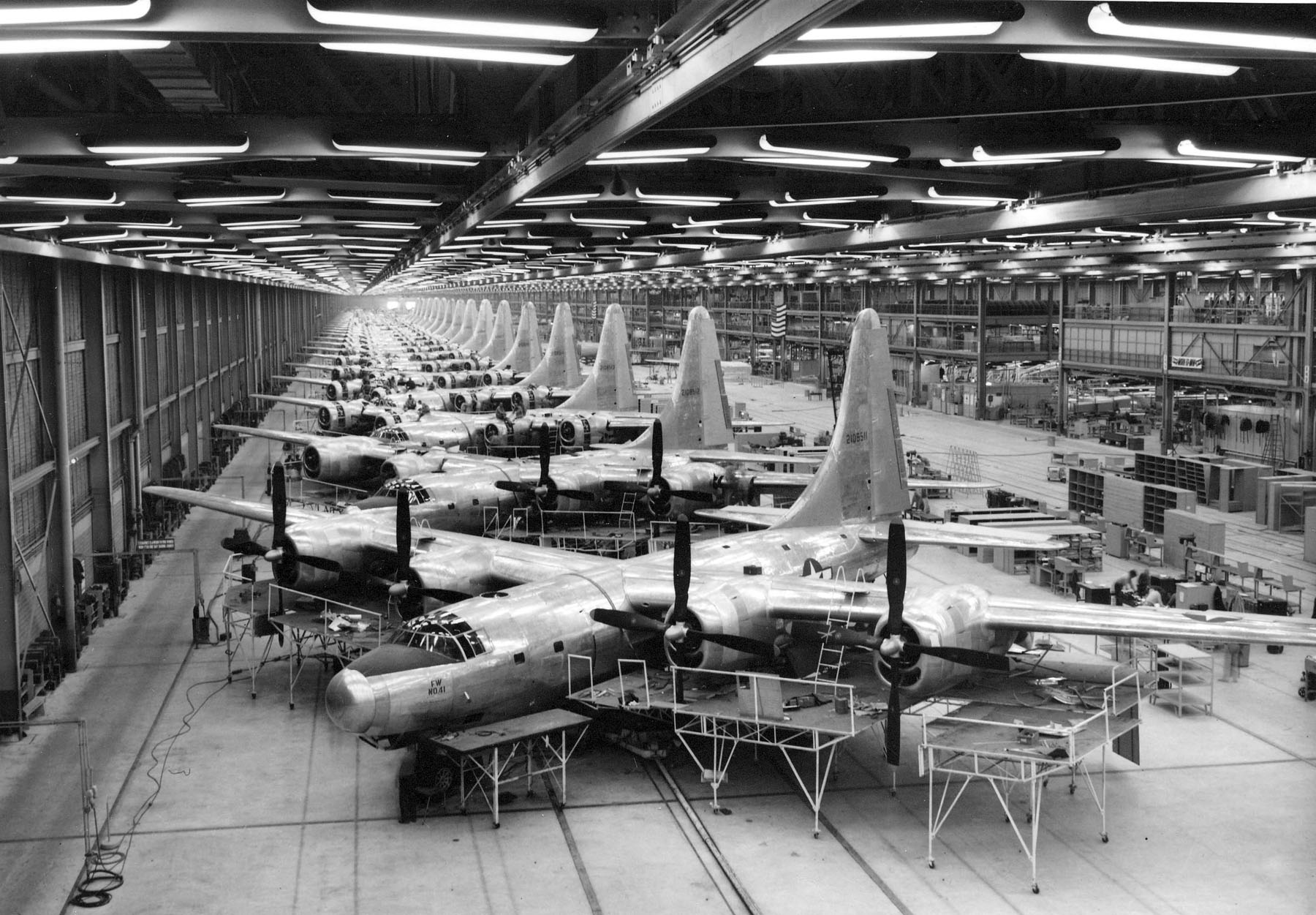
TB-32s being assembled

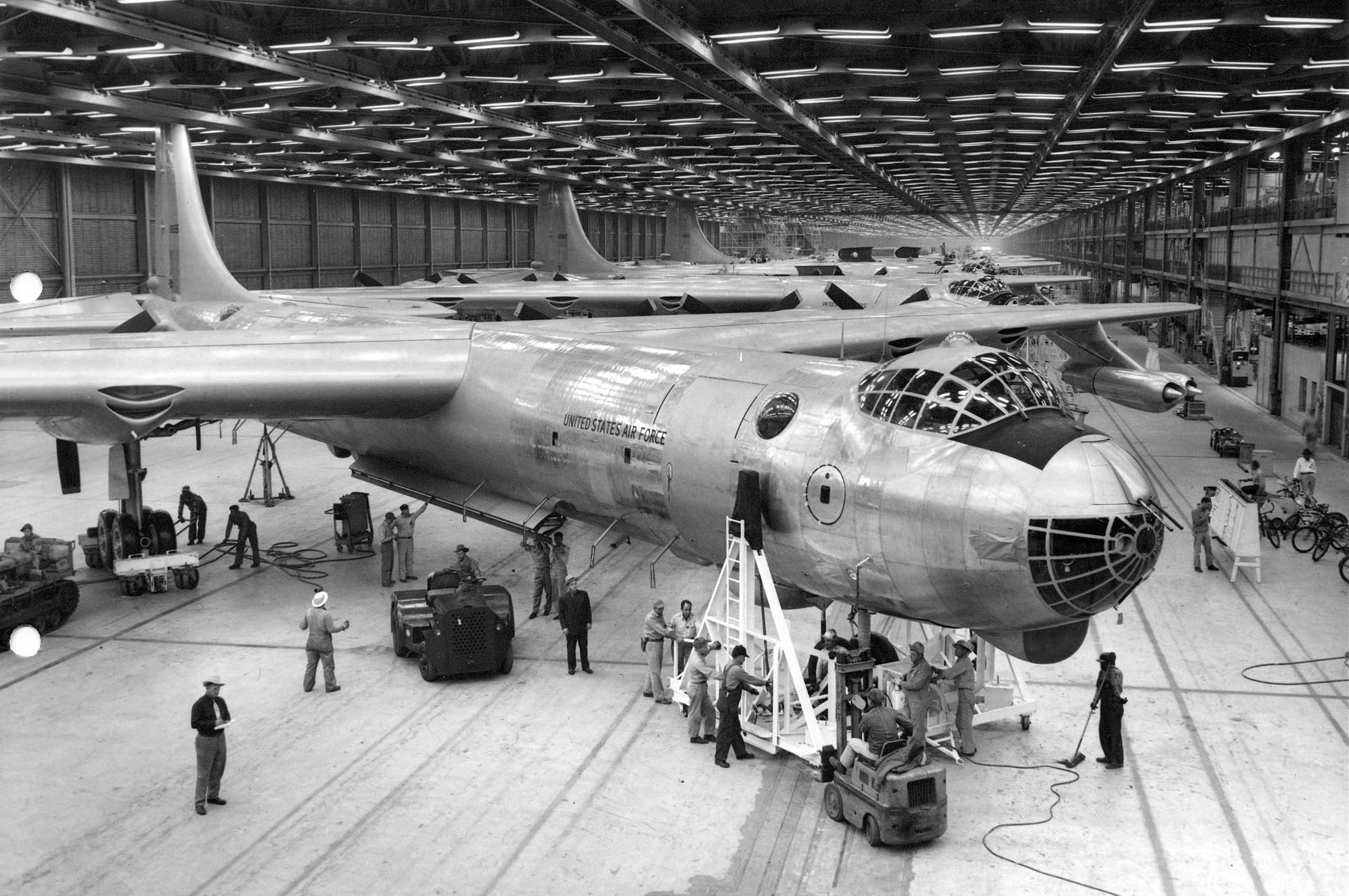
RB-36Ds

B-36 video clip

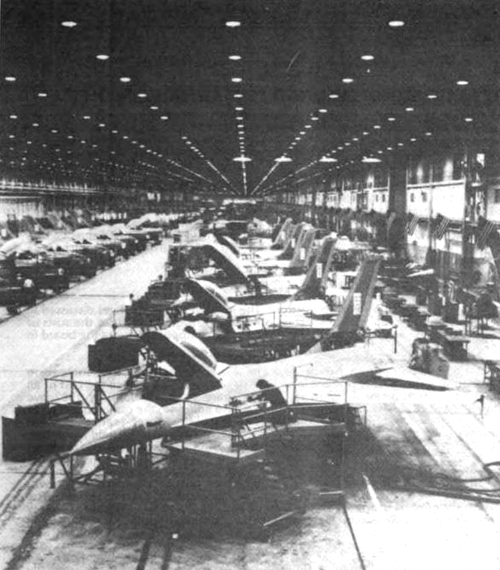
F-16s 1986

== See also ==
- Air Force Plant 6, Marietta, Georgia
- Air Force Plant 42, Palmdale, California
- Naval Air Station Fort Worth Joint Reserve Base
- Carswell Air Force Base
