= Glenn L. Martin Bomber Plant =

Former aerospace facility in Nebraska, US

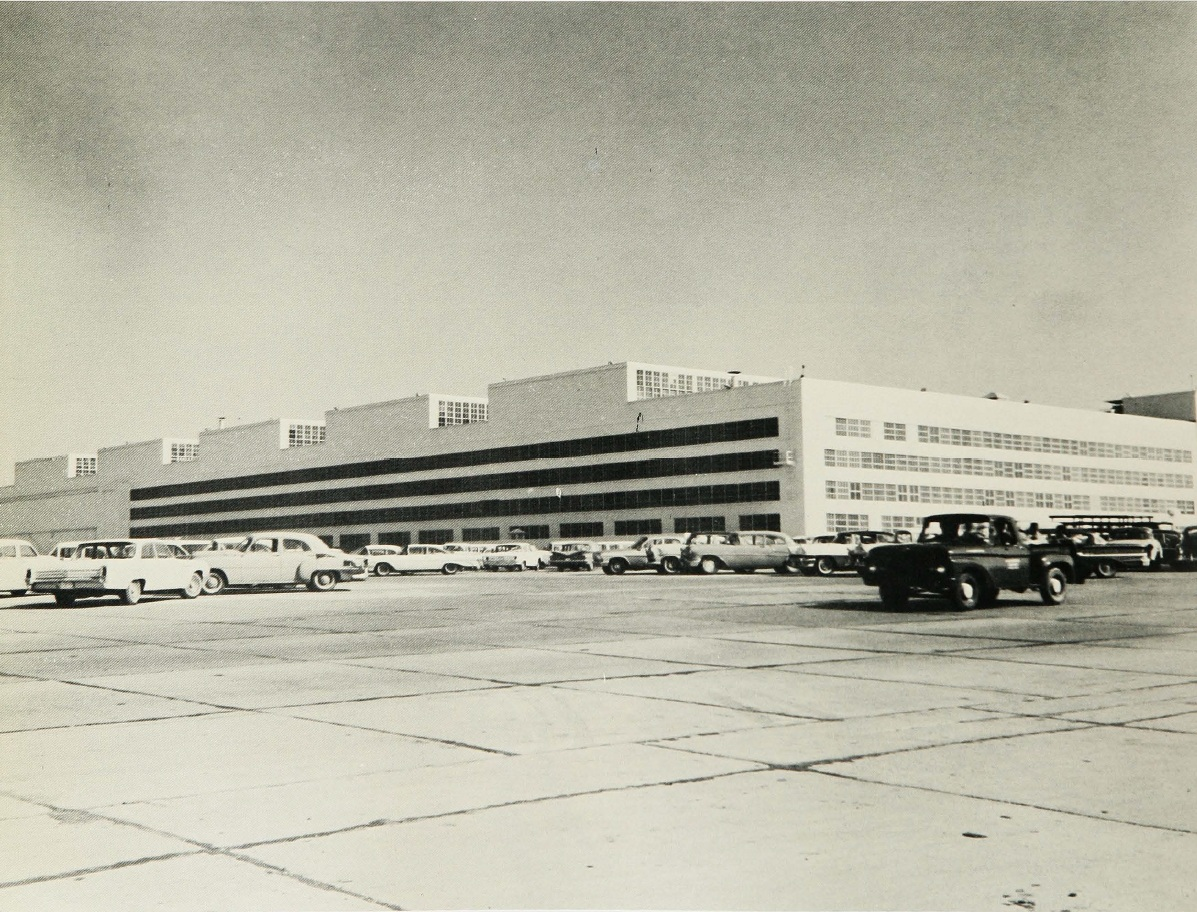
- Glenn L. Martin Plant, Omaha
- Built: 1940–1942
- Location: Offutt Field (now Air Force Base) Sarpy County, Nebraska, U.S.
- Coordinates: 41.13°N 95.92°W
- Industry: Military aircraft - bombers
- Products: Martin B-26 Marauder (1,585); Boeing B-29 Superfortress (531)
- Area: 1,700,000 sq ft (39 acres; 0.16 km^{2})
- Defunct: 1945; 81 years ago

Location in the United States

The Glenn L. Martin Bomber Plant (also known as Air Force Plant 1) was an aircraft manufacturing facility in the central United States, located at Offutt Field, Nebraska, south of Omaha. Adjacent to suburban Bellevue in Sarpy County, the plant was operational during World War II, from 1942 to 1945.

== Background ==
In 1940, as American involvement in World War II loomed, the U.S. Army Air Corps chose Offutt Field as the site for a new bomber plant that was to be operated by the Glenn L. Martin Company. The plant's construction included a two-mile-long (3.2 km) concrete runway, six large hangars, and a 1,700,000-square-foot (39-acre; 160,000 m^{2}) aircraft assembly building.

=== B-26 ===
Martin began producing its bombers in January 1942, with the plant reaching full-scale production 8 June 1942. Initially producing B-26 Marauder medium bombers, 1,585 Marauders were built at this plant. The Army Air Forces designated the military personnel assigned to the plant as the 83d Army Air Force Technical Training Detachment, later re-designated as Sq L, Government-Owned Assembly Plant No. 1, WD-101, Army Air Forces Material Command. President Franklin D. Roosevelt toured the plant on 26 April 1943 with Nebraska Governor Dwight Griswold and plant owner Glenn L. Martin.

=== B-29 ===
Production switched to B-29 Superfortresses in 1944, and 531 of the Boeing-designed very heavy bombers were produced at the Nebraska site. Among these were the Enola Gay and Bockscar, the aircraft that dropped the first atomic weapons to be used in a military action (against the cities of Hiroshima and Nagasaki, Japan). Both were built and modified (Silverplate) at the base. Paul Tibbets personally selected the Enola Gay from the assembly line.

Production ended on 18 September 1945, when the last B-29 rolled out of the assembly building. With the manufacturing plant's closure, custody of the airfield and ground facilities were assumed by the 4131st Army Air Force Base Unit, Air Materiel Command.

The building's use continued at Offutt AFB into the 21st century.

== Demolition ==
Due its proximity to the main runway at Offutt, the building was scheduled to be demolished as a safety risk.
