= United States Air Force Plant 6 =

Aerospace facility in the United States

- Part of Air Force Materiel Command (AFMC)
- Located near: Marietta, Georgia
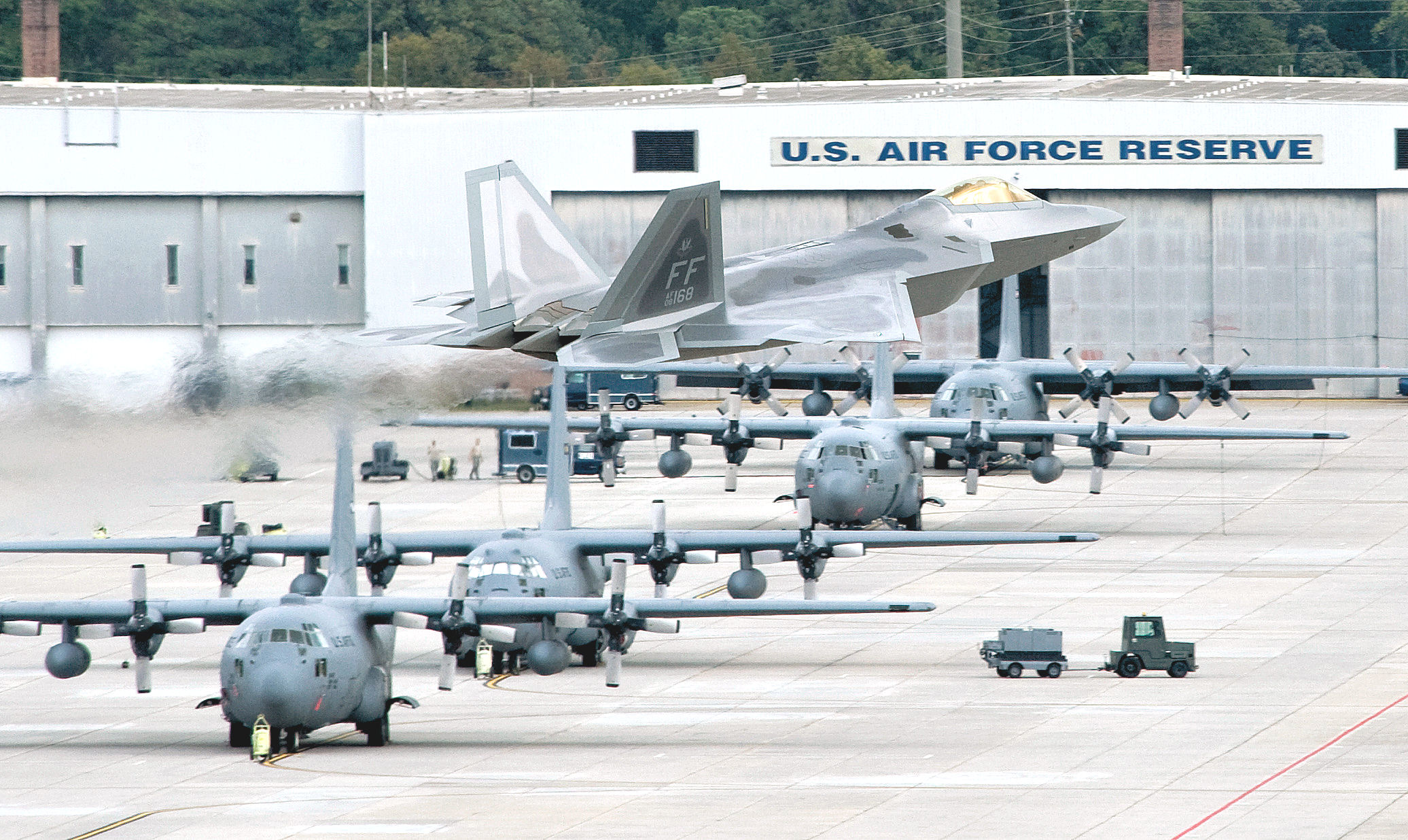
- An F-22A Raptor from the 1st Fighter Wing, Langley AFB, Virginia taking off in front of a C-130H Hercules of the Air Force Reserve 94th Airlift Wing at Dobbins ARB, Georgia. Plant #6 is located at Dobbins ARB

Site information
- Type: United States Government manufacturing facility
- Owner: United States Air Force
- Controlled by: Air Force Materiel Command

Location
- Location within Georgia
- Coordinates: 33°55′35″N 084°32′05″W

Site history
- Built: 1942
- In use: 1942–present

Garrison information
- Occupants: Air Force Materiel Command

Air Force Plant 6, known during World War II as the Bell Bomber Plant, is a government-owned, contractor-operated aerospace facility at Dobbins Air Reserve Base in Marietta, Georgia, currently owned by the United States Air Force and operated by Lockheed Martin Aeronautics. The plant, originally occupied by Bell Aircraft, began operation in April 1943 and was intended specifically to produce B-29 Superfortresses under license from Boeing. During the course of the War, the factory produced 668 B-29s for the United States Army Air Forces, and at its peak had a work force of approximately 28,000. After the War the factory was mothballed, but with the United States's entrance into the Korean War, in January 1951 the plant was turned over to Lockheed who began refurbishing B-29s. The plant remains in use today by Lockheed.

== History ==
Two weeks after the attack on Pearl Harbor, Bell Aircraft of Buffalo, New York was selected to produce B-29 Superfortresses under license from Boeing. Bell had been founded in 1935 by Lawrence D. Bell, and at the time of the United States's entrance into the War, had a workforce of around 1,000. As the nation prepared to expand its military production, the Roosevelt Administration believed that it was important to situate aircraft plants inland, away from vulnerable coastal positions. Atlanta had a pre-existing airport – Candler Field – and extensive railroad network, and thus seemed a logical choice for a new factory. In September 1940 Roosevelt had appointed Marietta native Lucius D. Clay head of a large airport construction programme, which included Marietta's Rickenbacker Field. After Bell was given the B-29 contract, Clay, along with Cobb County officials lobbied the Government to award the new plant to Marietta over other Atlanta suburbs. On 19 February 1942 the Government announced that Marietta would be the site of the new factory. That same day the Government announced it was taking control of Rickenbacker Field, which it would rename Marietta Army Airfield

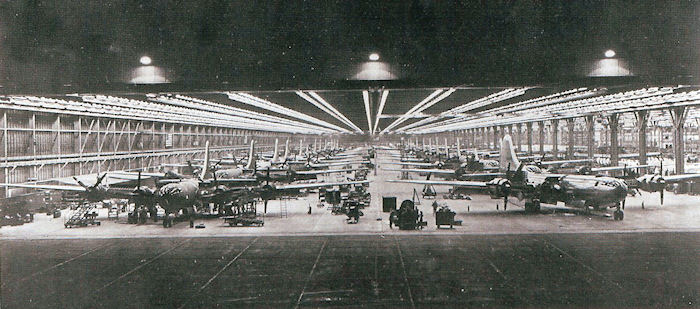
B-29s in the main assembly building.

Construction of the plant began on 30 March 1942. Located at the northwest corner of airstrip, the complex consisted of four main buildings:

- B-1 – main assembly
- B-2 – administration
- B-3 – hangar (armament assembly)
- B-4 – hangar (radio and radar assembly)

On 15 April 1943 the plant officially opened, and the first Bell B-29 was flown on 4 November 1943. During the War the plant had a succession of four general managers: Captain Harry E. Collins, Omer Woodson, Carl Cover, and James V. Carmichael. At its peak in February 1945 the plant employed over 28,000 workers. Roughly 37 percent of the workforce was female, and 8 percent African American. During the War the factory was racially segregated. On 28 November 1944 Bob Hope gave a performance at the plant. By the summer of 1945 Bell began to scale back production and by the fall only had a couple thousand employees. In 1946 the factory was fully closed, after having produced a total of 668 B-29s. After closing, building B-1 was used for storage, while building B-2 was occupied by the Veterans' Administration.

Two Marietta-built B-29s survive today: 44–84076, which is located at the Strategic Air Command and Aerospace Museum in Ashland, Nebraska, and 44–84053, which is located at the Museum of Aviation in Warner Robins, Georgia.

In January 1951 the Government turned the plant over to Lockheed for the purpose of refurbishing B-29 to go into service in the Korean War. During the 1950s Lockheed also produced 394 B-47 Stratojets at the plant. Today the site is used for the fabrication and assembly of large aircraft. Plant 6 provides repair, retrofit and overhaul of F-22A, C-130 and other Air Force aircraft currently in the inventory, as well as providing technical support.

== Bibliography ==
- Bell Aircraft Corporation Motion Picture Division. B-29s over Dixie.
- Bell Aircraft Georgia Division (Marietta) Collection, 1942-1945. Kennesaw State University Archives.
- Holland, Jeffrey L. Under One Roof: The Story of Air Force Plant 6. Dayton: Aernonautical Systems Center, 2006.
- Kirby, Joe. The Bell Bomber Plant. Charleston: Arcadia Publishing, 2008.

== See also ==
- Air Force Plant 42, Palmdale, California
- Air Force Plant 4, Fort Worth, Texas
- Dobbins Air Reserve Base
