= Stob na Boine Druim-fhinn =

Mountain in Argyll and Bute, Scotland

Coordinates: 56°10′49″N 4°57′3″W

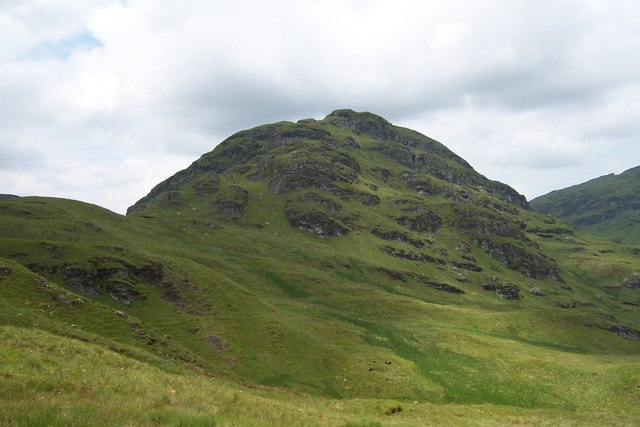
- Stob na Boine Druim-fhinn from the east

Highest point
- Elevation: 658.4 m (2,160 ft)
- Prominence: 149.6 m

Naming
- English translation: peak of the white-backed cow

Geography
- Location: Argyll and Bute, Scotland
- Parent range: Arrochar Alps
- OS grid: NN168025

Stob na Boine Druim-fhinn is a mountain on the Cowal peninsula in Argyll, Scotland, northwest of Lochgoilhead.

On 17 January 1949, a United States Army Air Forces Boeing B-29 Superfortress (44-62279) of the 31st Test and Evaluation Squadron was on a flight from RAF Scampton, England, to Reykjavík, Iceland. At 9:50am, the B-29 crashed into the side of Stob na Boine Druim-fhinn, killing all twenty passengers and crew. The cause of the crash was not determined, but the adverse weather and heavy icing were deemed to be contributory factors.
