= Boeing Renton Factory =

Airplane assembly facility in Renton, Washington

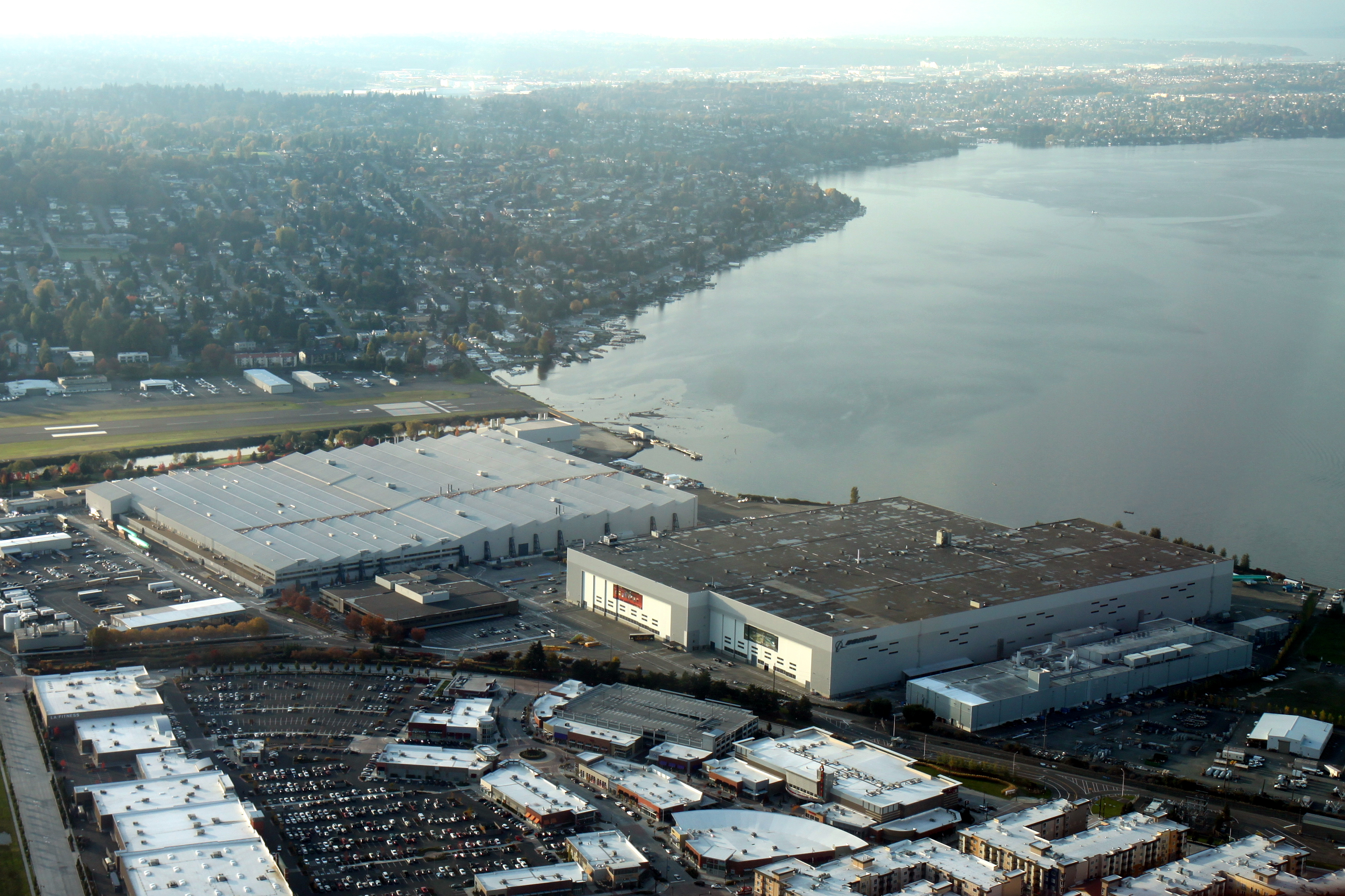
- Aerial view of Boeing Renton Factory adjacent to the Renton Municipal Airport in 2011
- Built: 1941
- Operated: 1941–July 1946, 1949–Present
- Location: Renton, Washington
- Coordinates: 47.4993°N 122.209°W
- Industry: Aerospace
- Products: Boeing 737 MAX; Boeing P-8 Poseidon
- Employees: 12,000 (2025)
- Area: 1,100,000 square feet (100,000 m^{2})
- Owner: Boeing Commercial Airplanes

The Boeing Renton Factory is the Boeing Company's manufacturing facility for narrow-body commercial airliners, and their military derivatives. Production includes the Boeing 737 MAX passenger airliner and the Boeing P-8 Poseidon military patrol aircraft. The factory covers 1,100,000 square feet (100,000 m^{2}) of floor space. The factory lies adjacent to Renton Municipal Airport.

== Background ==
The Boeing Renton Factory is built on land reclaimed by the lowering of the level of Lake Washington in 1916. At that time, it was purchased by industrialist Charles H. Burnett who intended to use it for coal storage and shipment. Those plans never came to be, and the semi-swampland was used as a hay farm. In 1936, Burnett's daughter Amy Louise Burnett Bond, transferred the land back to the state of Washington. Coincidentally, Burnett Bond was a close friend of Bertha Potter (wife of William E. Boeing), being both her godmother, and living with her family while she attended finishing school.

At the start of World War II, the property was transferred from the state to the federal government. Due to its location on a large body of water, the Navy Department worked to establish a flying boat aircraft factory on the land for production of the Boeing XPBB Sea Ranger. This order was cancelled, however, to free the factory for production of the Boeing B-29 Superfortress, the factory being transferred to the Army in exchange for use of the North American Aviation's Kansas City factory for production of the land-based B-25 Mitchell for the Marine Corps.

After the end of World War II, the Superfortress production line was no longer necessary, and the plant closed in July 1946. The building was used for other purposes, including as a temporary home for a circus. Boeing reopened the Renton plant in 1949 to build the Boeing C-97 Stratofreighter and it has been in use since.

The Renton plant would also be used as a shipbuilding facility from 1974 to 1985, building the Pegasus-class hydrofoil for the Navy, and commercial Boeing 929 jetfoils alongside the aircraft production lines.

The factory has its own rail spur where BNSF Railway trains can deliver parts to the factory. This practice started in the 1960s during the construction of the 707, but has become most prominent during the construction of the 737, with the entire fuselage being delivered to the factory by rail.

== Aircraft production history ==
=== Boeing B-29 Superfortress ===
At the start of World War II, the factory was used for production of the Boeing B-29 Superfortress. A total of 1,119 B-29s were built in the Renton plant.

=== Boeing C-97 Stratofreighter ===
The plant was briefly closed at the end of World War II, but by 1949 it was re-opened to build the Boeing C-97 Stratofreighter for the United States Air Force. In all, 943 C-97s were built in the Renton plant.

=== Boeing 707/KC-135 Stratotanker ===
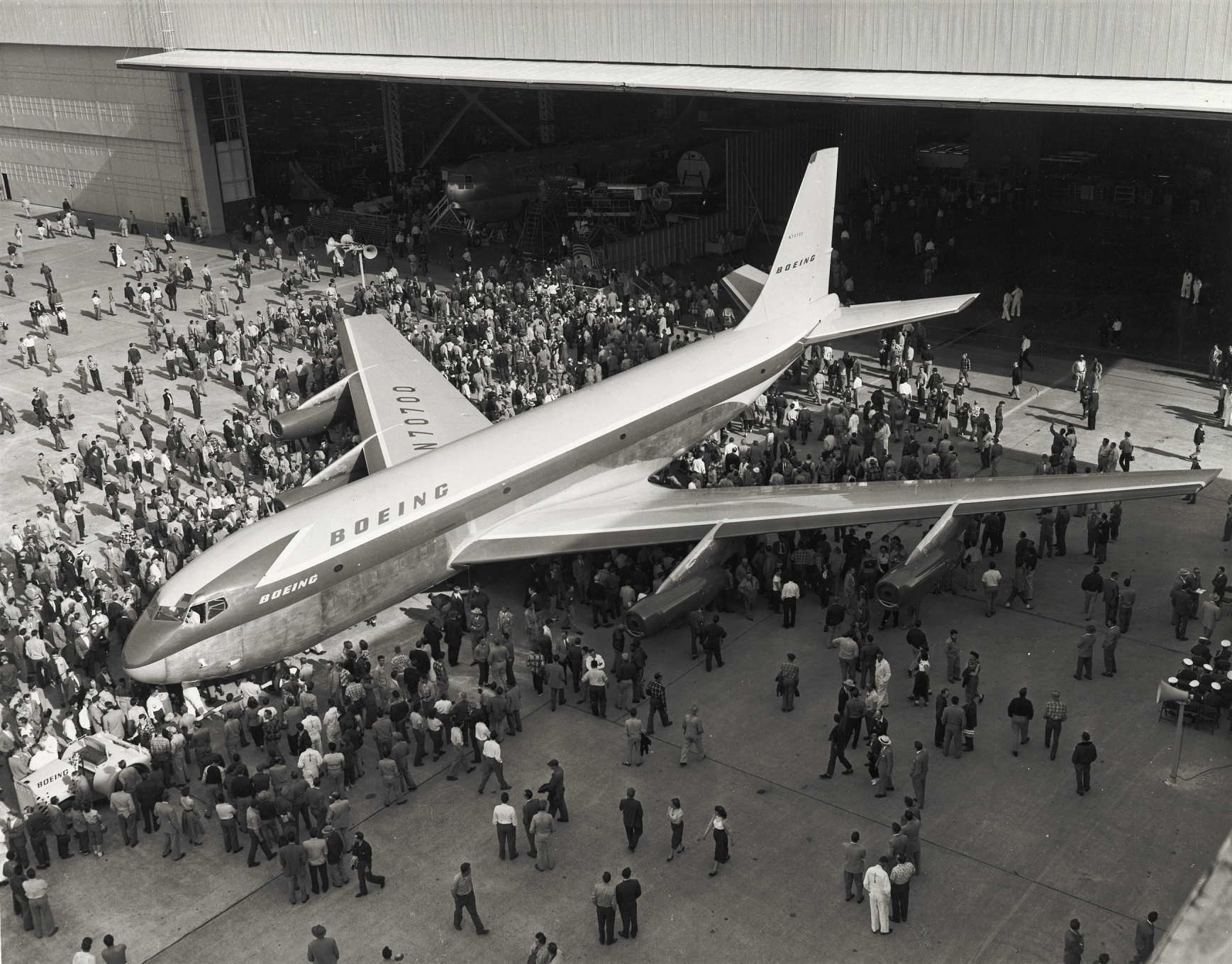
The Boeing 367-80 during its roll-out from Renton in May 1954

In 1952, Boeing began developing the Boeing 367-80, to demonstrate the advantages of jet propulsion for commercial aviation. Nicknamed the "Dash 80," the prototype rolled out of the Renton factory in May 1954 and would become the basis for two different production aircraft: the military KC-135 Stratotanker and the 707, the first successful commercial jetliner.

Production of the KC-135 Stratotanker began first, and the initial aircraft to roll out in August 1956 was named City of Renton. A total of 803 Stratotankers would be built, and as of 2022, many remain in service.

The first production Boeing 707 was rolled out at Renton on October 28, 1957, and helped lead exponential growth in air travel. The 707 would prove to be a victim of its own success, too small to handle the increased numbers of passengers it had ushered in, and its design did not allow for a stretching of the fuselage. Commercial sales of the Boeing 707 ceased in 1978 after a total of 865 had been built.

The airframe would continued to be built in limited numbers until April 30, 1991, for conversion into the E-3 Sentry and C-137 Stratoliner military aircraft.

=== Boeing 727 ===
In 1963, Boeing introduced the 727, a lighter tri-jet. Compared to the heavier 707 quad-jet, the 727 could operate on shorter flight lengths from smaller airports (sometimes called "short and thin" routes). The aircraft became the best-selling jetliner of the 1960s and a mainstay of the U.S. domestic airline market. A total of 1,832 aircraft were produced at the Renton plant before it was discontinued in 1984 in favor of the Boeing 757.

=== Boeing 737 ===
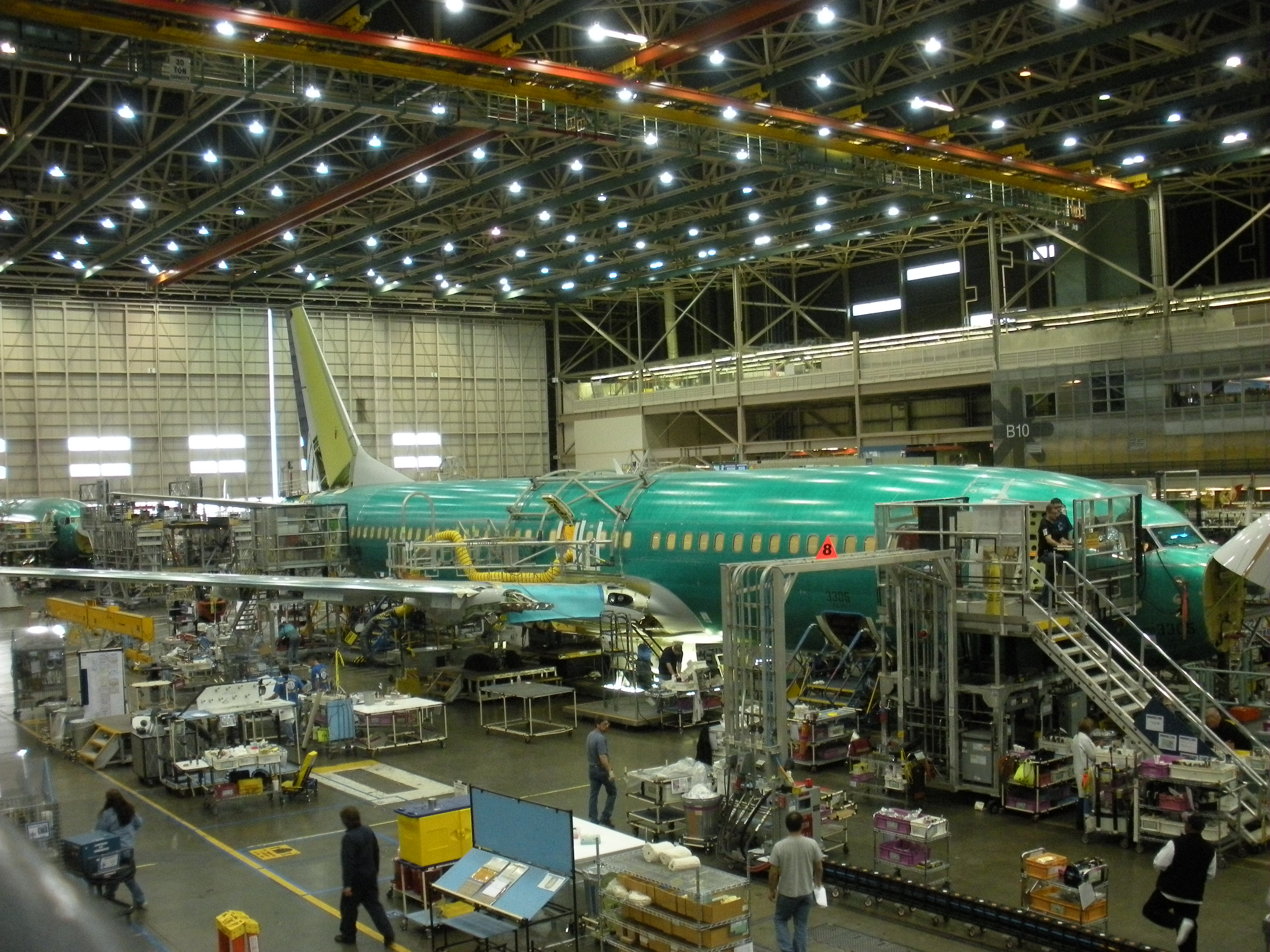
Assembly of a 737 in the Renton Factory

In 1967, Boeing introduced the 737, envisioned as a complement to the 727 that could operate on even shorter and thinner routes. The 737 would retain the 707 fuselage cross-section, but with only two engines.

The aircraft proved extremely popular and as of March 2022, a total of 10,963 have been built across four generations, offering several variants for 85 to 215 passengers.

The Renton factory also produces airframes for the P-8 Poseidon, a maritime patrol "submarine hunter" aircraft for the United States Navy.

Boeing 737 aircraft typically leave the Renton factory complete, but not yet ready for customer delivery. After a first test flight, the aircraft land at Boeing Field in Seattle, where final preparations for delivery are made including aircraft painting, interior fitting installation, and test flights. For customers based in China, the final preparations are made at Boeing's completion center in Zhoushan, China.

=== Boeing 757 ===
In 1982, Boeing introduced the 757, a twinjet successor to the 727. The aircraft was longer than the 737, offering additional capacity, and was capable of operating over longer routes. A total of 1,049 aircraft were produced before the model was cancelled due to declining sales. The last aircraft rolled off the line on October 28, 2004.

== See also ==
- Boeing Everett Factory – The company's wide-body aircraft manufacturing facility located north of Seattle
- Boeing South Carolina – The company's manufacturing facility for the 787 Dreamliner
- Airbus Mobile – A competing narrow-body aircraft manufacturing facility
