= 301st Operations Group =

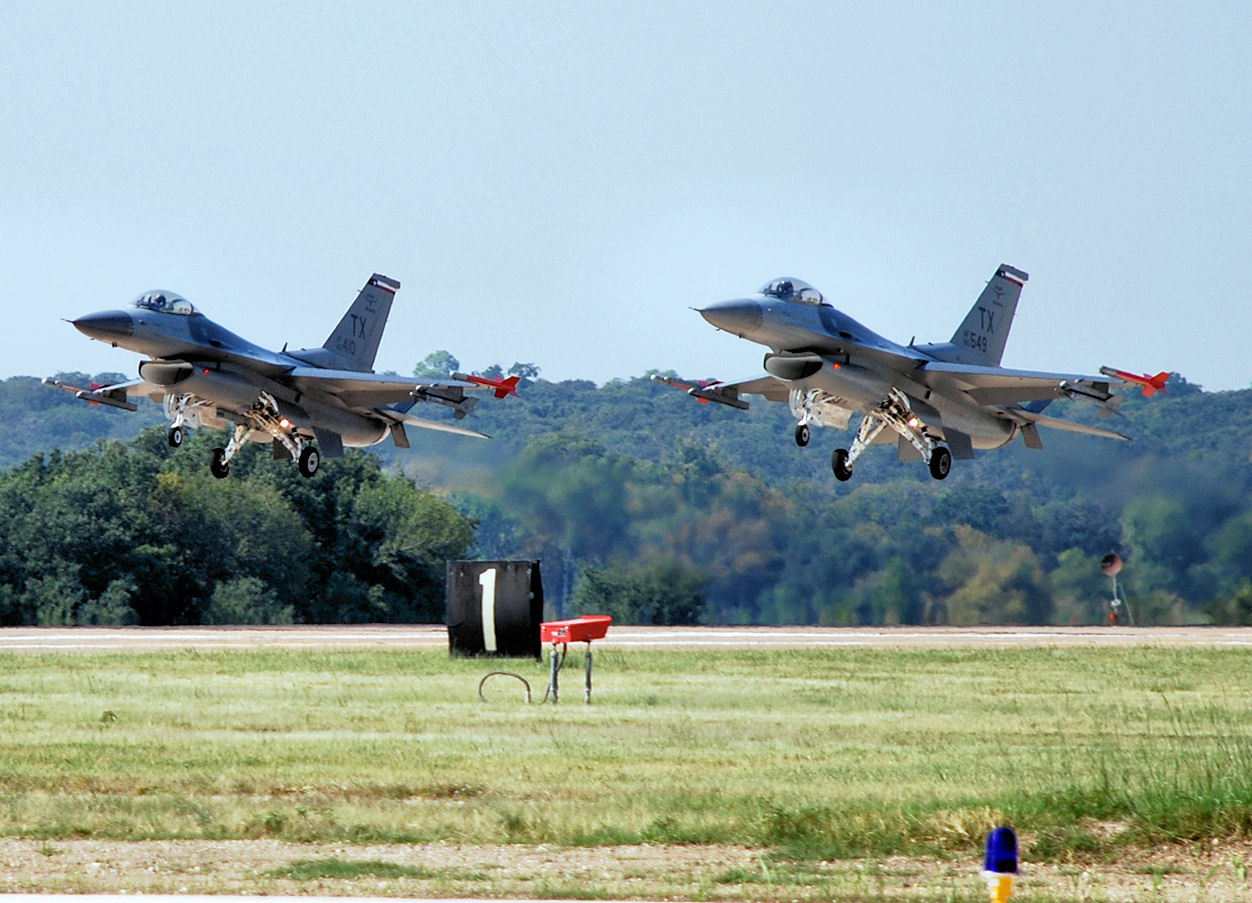
- 457th Fighter Squadron F-16s taking off from Carswell Field
- Active: 3 February 1942 – present
- Country: United States
- Branch: United States Air Force
- Type: Group
- Role: Fighter
- Part of: Air Force Reserve Command
- Garrison/HQ: Carswell Field, Naval Air Station Joint Reserve Base Fort Worth, Texas
- Tail Code: Texas flag tail stripe "TX" "Texas Longhorns"
- Engagements: World War II – American Campaign (Antisubmarine); World War II – EAME Theater

- Decorations: Distinguished Unit Citation (2x); Air Force Outstanding Unit Award (5x)

Insignia
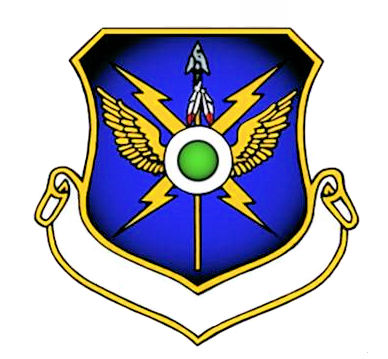
- 301st Operations Group emblem

Aircraft flown
- Fighter: F-16C/D Fighting Falcon

The 301st Operations Group (301 OG) is a flying component of the 301st Fighter Wing, assigned to the United States Air Force Reserve Tenth Air Force. The group is stationed at Carswell Field, Texas.

During World War II, the group's predecessor unit, the 301st Bombardment Group was a highly decorated group flying B-17 Flying Fortresses that served primarily in North Africa and Italy. It operated as part of Eighth, Twelfth and Fifteenth Air Forces.

In the postwar era, the 301st Bombardment Group was one of the first USAAF units assigned to the Strategic Air Command on 4 August 1946, prior to the establishment of the United States Air Force. The group was activated as a redesignation of the 467th Bombardment Group due to the Air Force's policy of retaining only low-numbered groups on active duty after the war.

The group was inactivated in 1952 when the parent wing assigned all of the group's squadrons directly to the wing.

The group was reactivated as the 301st Operations Group in 1991 when the 301st Air Refueling Wing adopted the USAF Objective organization plan.

== Overview ==
The 301st Operations Group (Tail Code: TX) is equipped with the F-16C+ Fighting Falcon. It commands the operational fighter squadrons of the 301st Fighter Wing.

The group has a rich tradition of leadership in the reserve component of the Air Force dating back to the mid-1940s and continues to make history.

== Components ==
The group consists of the following squadrons:

- 457th Fighter Squadron
- 301st Operations Support Flight

== History ==
Note: The 301st Operations Group does not share a common history or heritage with its parent unit, the 301st Fighter Wing, being assigned to the 301st FW on 1 August 1992. See the 301st Air Refueling Wing for additional history and lineage from 1947–1992

=== World War II ===
Media related to 301st Bombardment Group (United States Army Air Forces) at Wikimedia Commons

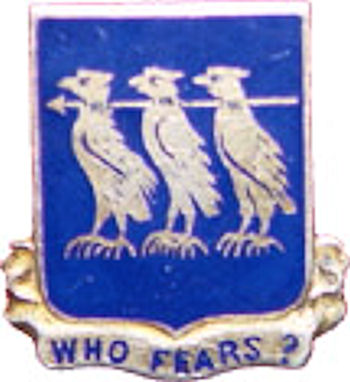
301st Bombardment Group Emblem

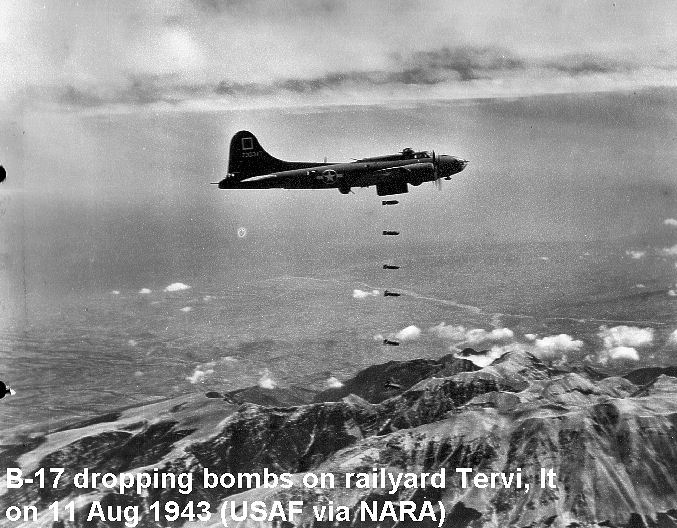
B-17F of the 301st BG attacking a railyard at Terni, Italy, 11 August 1943

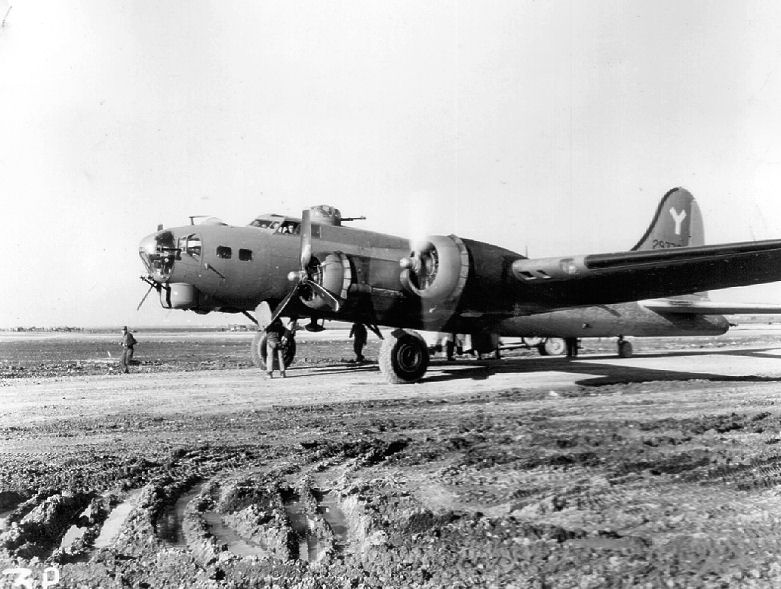
B-17G of the 301st BG at an airfield in North Africa, 1943

After activation in February 1942, trained with B-17s. Air echelon operated 5–15 June 1942 from Muroc Dry Lake, CA, and performed anti-submarine patrols off the California coast. Reunited with ground echelon after arrival in England in August 1942.

Entered combat with Eighth Air Force in September 1942. Began combat in September 1942, attacking submarine pens, airfields, railroads, bridges, and other targets on the Continent, primarily in France.

Reassigned to Twelfth Air Force and moved to North Africa in November 1942. Bombed docks, shipping facilities, airdromes, and railroad yards in Tunisia, Sicily, and Sardinia. Attacked enemy shipping between Tunisia and Sicily. Received a Distinguished Unit Citation for action on 6 April 1943 when the group withstood intense antiaircraft fire from shore defenses and nearby vessels to attack a convoy of merchant ships off Bizerte and thus destroy supplies essential to the Axis defense of Tunisia. Assaulted gun positions on Pantelleria during May–June 1943. Flew numerous missions to Italy, July–October 1943.

Assigned to Fifteenth Air Force in November 1943, moved to Italy in December, and afterward directed most of its attacks against European theatre of World War II strategic targets such as oil centers, communications, and industrial areas. Received another DUC for a mission to Germany on 25 February 1944 when, in spite of vicious encounters with enemy fighters, the group bombed aircraft production centers at Regensburg. In 1944–1945, supported ground forces in the Anzio and Cassino areas during the invasion of Southern France, knocked out targets to assist the Russian advance in the Balkans, and aided the Allied drive through the Po Valley. Flew 478 combat missions; 132 aircraft lost.

Returned to the US in July 1945. Redesignated 301st Bombardment Group (Very Heavy) in August and prepared for transition to B-29 Superfortresses and a move to the Southwest Pacific. Inactivated on 15 October 1945.

=== Cold War ===
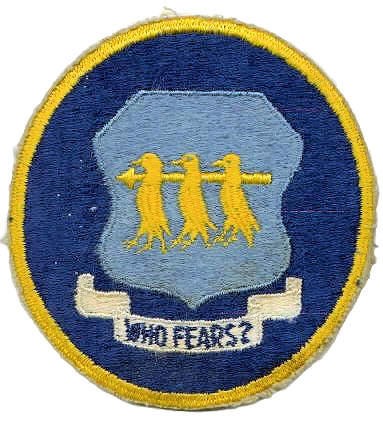
Emblem of the SAC 301st Bombardment Group

Activated on 4 August 1946 but probably not manned until August 1947. Assigned to Strategic Air Command. Equipped with B-29 Superfortresses for bombardment operations. Deployed to Furstenfeldbruck AB, Germany, July–August 1948; to RAF Station Scampton, England, October 1948 – January 1949; and to RAF Stations Lakenheath and Sculthorpe, May–November 1950.

Reassigned to Barksdale AFB, Louisiana in 1949 and added an air refueling mission. The 301st was one of the first units to conduct aerial refueling operations with the KB-29 tanker version of the Superfortress. In February 1950, rotated squadrons to Goose Bay, Labrador, for air refueling training in cold climates. Reduced to "paper" strength in February 1951 and inactivated in June 1952.

=== Modern era ===
Refueled aircraft in CONUS and provided tankers and crews for various Tanker Task Forces in Saudi Arabia, September 1991 – May 1992. After activation in the Reserve on 1 August 1992, trained for possible worldwide deployment for counter-air, interdiction and close air support missions. Supported Operation Deny Flight in Bosnia-Herzegovina, deploying F-16 aircraft and crews to Aviano AB, Italy, 1 December 1993 – 2 January 1994. Elements deployed again to Aviano, 2 January – 9 March 1996 to enforce a no-fly zone over Bosnia. Deployed aircraft and personnel to Karup AS, Denmark, for a combined force exercise, 24 May–June 1997.

=== Lineage ===
- Established as 301st Bombardment Group (Heavy) on 28 January 1942

Activated on 3 February 1942
Redesignated: 301st Bombardment Group, Heavy c. 20 August 1943
Redesignated: 301st Bombardment Group, Very Heavy on 5 August 1945
Inactivated on 15 October 1945

- Organized and activated, on 4 August 1946 from the personnel and equipment of the 467th Bombardment Group (Inactivated)

Redesignated: 301st Bombardment Group, Medium on 28 May 1948
Inactivated on 16 June 1952

- Redesignated: 301st Operations Group on 29 August 1991

Activated on 1 September 1991
Inactivated on 1 June 1992

- Activated in the Reserve on 1 August 1992.

=== Assignments ===
- Second Air Force, 3 February 1942
- First Air Force, 21 June 1942
- VIII Bomber Command, c. 9 August 1942
- XII Bomber Command, 14 September 1942
- 5th Bombardment Wing, January 1943
- Second Air Force, July 1945
- 16th Bombardment Operational Training Wing, 17 August – 15 October 1945
- Fifteenth Air Force, 4 August 1946
- 301st Bombardment Wing, 5 November 1947 – 16 June 1952
- 301st Air Refueling Wing, 1 September 1991 – 1 June 1992
- 301st Fighter Wing, 1 August 1992 -Previous

=== Components ===
- 29th Reconnaissance (later, 419th Bombardment) Squadron: 3 February 1942 – 15 October 1945
- 32d Bombardment Squadron: attached 16–30 March 1942, assigned 31 March 1942 – 15 October 1945; assigned 4 August 1946 – 16 June 1952 (detached 10 February 1951 – 16 June 1952)
- 91st Air Refueling Squadron: 1 September 1991 – 1 June 1992
- 301st Air Refueling Squadron: 1 March 1949 – 16 June 1952 (detached 10 February 1951 – 16 June 1952)
- 352d Bombardment Squadron: 3 February 1942 – 15 October 1945; 4 August 1946 – 16 June 1952 (detached c. 30 June–September 1948 and 10 February 1951 – 16 June 1952)
- 353d Bombardment Squadron: 3 February 1942 – 15 October 1945; 4 August 1946 – 16 June 1952 (detached 10 February 1951 – 16 June 1952)
- 354th Bombardment Squadron: 3 February – 16 March 1942
- 457th Fighter Squadron: 1 August 1992–present

=== Stations ===
- Geiger Field, Washington, 3 February 1942
- Alamogordo Army Airfield

Elements trained at Albuquerque Army Airbase, New Mexico, 27 May 1942

- Richmond Army Air Base, Virginia, 21 June – 19 July 1942
- RAF Chelveston (USAAF Station 105), England, August 1942
- Oran Tafaraoui Airport, Algeria, 26 November 1942 (air echelon)
- Maison Blanche Airport, Algeria, 5 December 1942 (air echelon)
- Biskra Airfield, Algeria, 16 December 1942 (air echelon)
- Ste-Barbe-du-Tlelat Airfield, Algeria, 21 December 1942 (ground echelon)
- Ain M'lila Airfield, Algeria, c. 17 January 1943
- Saint-Donat Airfield, Algeria, 6 March 1943
- Oudna Airfield, Tunisia, 6 August 1943
- Cerignola Airfield, Italy, c. 7 December 1943
- Lucera Airfield, Italy, 1 February 1944 – c. July 1945
- Sioux Falls Army Air Field, South Dakota, 28 July 1945
- Mountain Home AAF, Idaho, ID, 17 August 1945
- Pyote Army Air Field, Texas, 23 August – 15 October 1945
- Clovis Army Air Field, New Mexico, 4 August 1946
- Smoky Hill AAF (later, AFB), Kansas, 16 July 1947
- Barksdale AFB, Louisiana, 7 November 1949 – 16 June 1952
- Malmstrom AFB, Montana, 1 September 1991 – 1 June 1992
- Carswell AFB (later, ARS), Texas, 1 August 1992–present

=== Aircraft assigned ===
- B-17 Flying Fortress, 1942–1945
- B-29 Superfortress, 1947–1951
- KB-29 Superfortress (Tanker), 1949–1951
- KC-135 Stratotanker, 1991–1992
- F-16 Falcon, 1992–present

== See also ==
530th Air Service Group Support organization for the group at Foggia and Pyote AAF
