= Sainte-Barbe du Tlélat Airfield =

Algerian WW2 military airfield

Sainte-Barbe du Tlélat Airfield
- Part of Twelfth Air Force

Site information
- Type: Military airfield
- Controlled by: United States Army Air Forces

Location
- Coordinates: 35°33′05.20″N 000°26′53.59″W

Site history
- Built: 1942
- In use: 1942-1943

Location of Sainte-Barbe du Tlélat, Algeria

Sainte-Barbe du Tlélat Airfield was a World War II military airfield in Algeria near the city of Oued Tlélat.

The airfield was a temporary facility used by the United States Army Air Force Twelfth Air Force during the North African Campaign against the German Afrika Korps. It was the home of the 27th Fighter Group from 26 December 1942 until mid-January 1943, which flew A-20 Havoc light bombers.

The airfield consisted of grass or Pierced Steel Planking runways and parking and dispersal areas, with support structures were quickly constructed out of wood or tents, along with (if needed) a temporary steel control tower. Six-man tents were used for billeting, lined up in rows with the orderly room and the mess hall at one end. There was one, dimly lit, light bulb at the center of each tent. The tent floor was grass or more commonly, dirt. Eventually plywood was scavenged for flooring; wooden cots were used for beds, and ubiquitous 55-gallon drums were converted into a heater/stove and other uses.

The ground echelon of the 301st Bombardment Group also was assigned to the airfield in December 1942 and the airfield was dismantled in March 1943. Today, there is little or no evidence of the airfield, with the land now used in agriculture.
