= 457th Fighter Squadron =

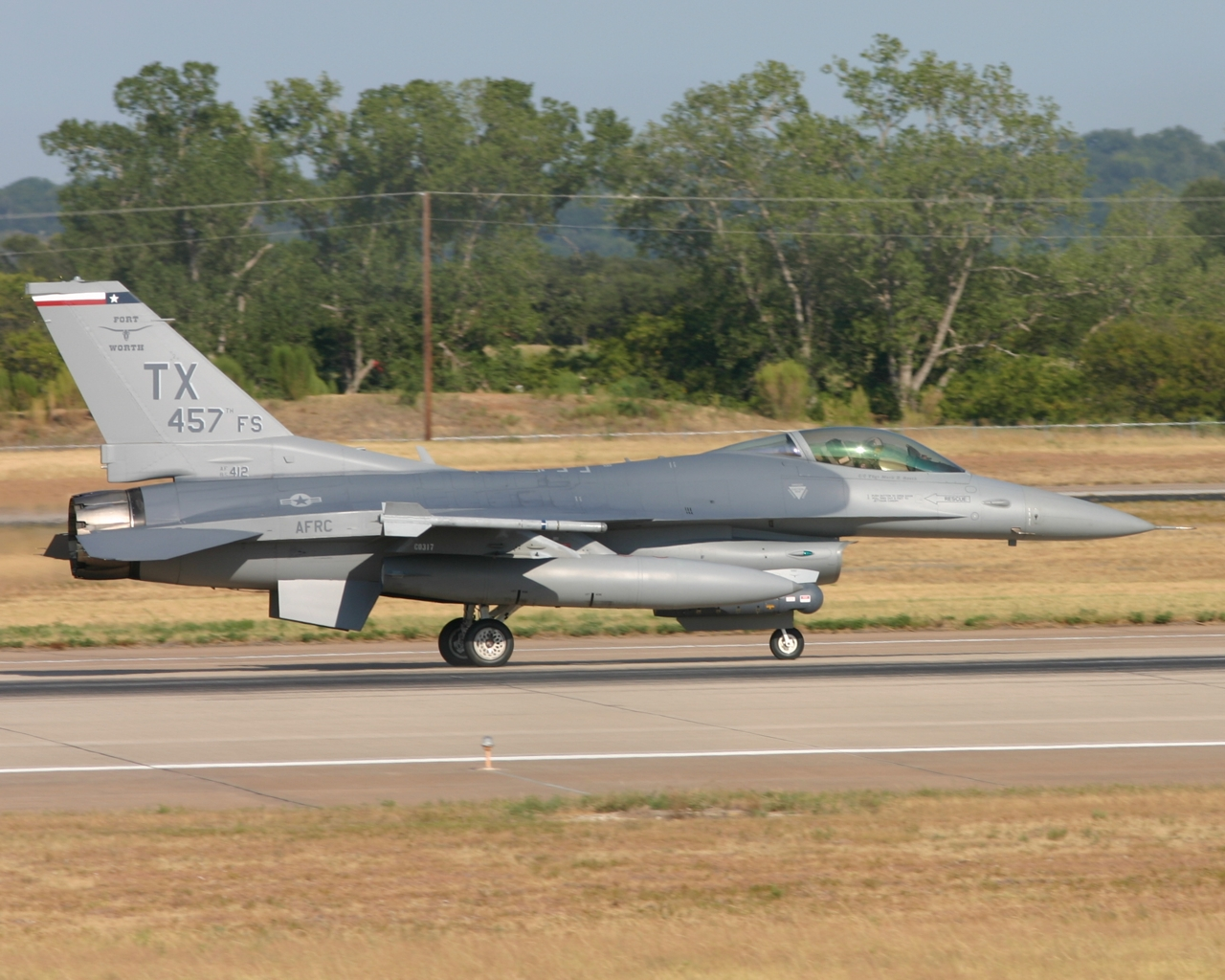
- 457th Fighter Squadron F-16 Fighting Falcon (Note: Aircraft is General Dynamics F-16C Block 30A, serial 85-1412, at NAS Fort Worth JRB)
- Active: 1944–1945; 1953–1959; 1972–present
- Country: United States
- Branch: United States Air Force
- Role: Fighter
- Part of: Air Force Reserve Command
- Garrison/HQ: Naval Air Station Joint Reserve Base Fort Worth
- Nickname: Spads
- Motto: Spad to the Bone
- Engagements: Pacific Ocean Theater; Global war on terrorism
- Decorations: Distinguished Unit Citation; Air Force Outstanding Unit Award

Insignia
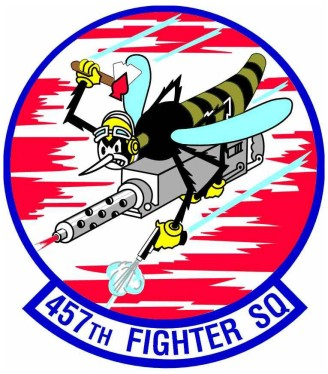
- 457th Fighter Squadron emblem (approved 27 April 2000)

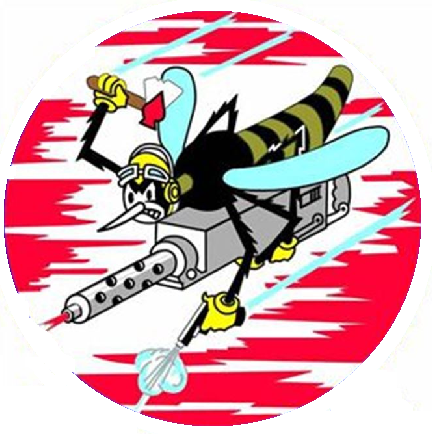
- 457th Fighter Squadron emblem (approved 20 January 1945)

The 457th Fighter Squadron is a United States Air Force Reserve Command unit, assigned to the 301st Operations Group, 301st Fighter Wing at Naval Air Station Joint Reserve Base Fort Worth, Texas. The squadron flies the Lockheed Martin F-35A Lightning II. If mobilized, the Wing is gained by the Air Combat Command.

The squadron was first activated in 1944 as a long range fighter unit. It deployed to Iwo Jima in the spring of 1945 and engaged in combat until V-J Day, earning a Distinguished Unit Citation. It returned to the United States in December 1945 and was inactivated.

The squadron was again activated in 1953 as the 457th Strategic Fighter Squadron. In 1957, it was transferred from Strategic Air Command to Tactical Air Command as the 457th Fighter-Day Squadron. The squadron was inactivated in April 1959.

It began its current active period in July 1972, when the regular Air Force transferred three squadrons of Republic F-105 Thunderchiefs to the reserves.

== Mission ==
The 457th Fighter Squadron is the only flying squadron attached to the 301st Fighter Wing. The unit is currently converting to the F-35A Lightning II, which will carry TX tail codes. The just retired Block 30 F-16Cs also carried the unit tail code TX on their F-16s. The earlier Block 25 F-16Cs flown by the unit during 1990-1996 carried TF tail codes. The F-4Ds and F-4Es operated by the 457th from 1981 to 1991 carried TH codes, as did the F-105s operated from 1972 to 1982.

== History ==
=== World War II ===
Constituted as 457 Fighter Squadron, Single Engine, on 5 October 1944. Activated on 21 October 1944 at Lakeland Army Air Field, Florida with North American P-51 Mustangs. Assigned to the 506th Fighter Group. Major Malcolm C. Watters was the unit's first commanding officer.

February 1945, the 457th moved to the western Pacific Ocean in spring of 1945. Operated from North Field, Iwo Jima, 25 April - 3 December 1945 (air echelon operated from Tinian, 23 March - 11 May 1945).

Escorted B-29 bombers in raids against Japan, and attacked targets such as enemy airfields, May – August 1945. The unit had on its roster Capt. Abner Aust, the last fighter Ace of WWII, and the only Ace the 457th had.

Between 1953 and 1959, and again since July 1972, trained for a variety of tactical air missions. Frequently deployed for training exercises, some of them overseas.

=== Reserve fighter operations ===
The 457th Tactical Fighter Squadron was reconstituted at Carswell AFB in 1972. It was initially equipped with 30 F-105D Thunderstick II aircraft. F-105 Operations continued until the winter of 1981/1982, when the F-105s were retired and F-4D Phantom IIs arrived. 27 F-4Ds served at Carswell, until being replaced in 1988 by F-4Es. 26 of the gun nosed Phantoms served for three years. Block 25 F-16Cs arrived early in 1991, and served until 1996. Block 30 F-16Cs then arrived and served until the end of 2023. The unit converted to the F-35A Lightning II in 2024.

Took part in Operation Deny Flight, enforcing a no-fly zone over Bosnia, in 1993 while flying out of Aviano AB in Italy. Participated in training exercises and deployments. Provided resources for Operation Northern Watch (1999–2000), Operation Southern Watch (2001), Operation Noble Eagle (2001–), and Operation Iraqi Freedom (2003–2011).

On 26 April 2019, 16 fighters of the squadron were deployed to Romania as part of Operation Atlantic Resolve. They were supported by two KC-10A Extender tankers during the flight over the Atlantic to the Spangdahlem Air Base, and from there they flew to the Romanian 71st Air Base. The F-16s participated in the Dacian Viper 2019 exercise and remained at the base until early August.

==== Global war on terror ====
Since 9/11 units and individual personnel in various career fields have supported a number of missions related to Operation Enduring Freedom, Operation Noble Eagle's homeland defense, and Operation Iraqi Freedom. The 457th FS ended a two-month deployment to Balad Air Base in support of Operation Iraqi Freedom in December 2005.

== Lineage ==
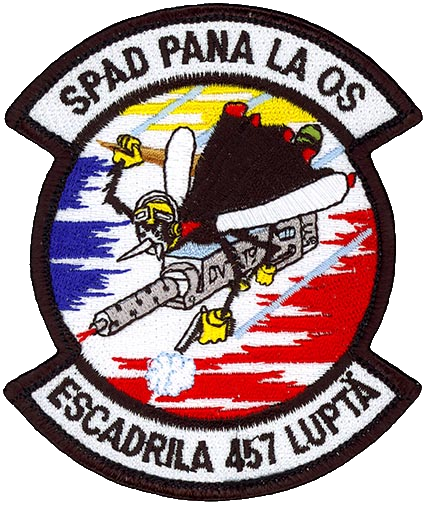
Patch used by the 457th while on deployment to Romania in 2019

- Constituted as the 457th Fighter Squadron, Single Engine, on 5 October 1944

Activated on 21 October 1944
Inactivated on 16 December 1945

- Redesignated 457th Strategic Fighter Squadron on 20 November 1952

Activated on 20 January 1953
Redesignated 457th Fighter-Day Squadron on 1 July 1957
Redesignated 457th Fighter-Bomber Squadron on 1 January 1958
Redesignated 457th Tactical Fighter Squadron on 1 July 1958
Inactivated on 1 April 1959

- Activated in the reserve on 8 July 1972

Redesignated 457th Fighter Squadron on 1 February 1992

=== Assignments ===
- 506th Fighter Group, 21 October 1944 – 16 December 1945
- 506th Strategic Fighter Wing (later 506th Fighter-Day Wing, 506th Fighter-Bomber Wing, 506th Tactical Fighter Wing), 20 January 1953 – 1 April 1959
- 506th Tactical Fighter Group, 8 July 1972
- 301st Tactical Fighter Wing (later 301st Fighter Wing), 25 March 1973
- 301st Operations Group, 1 August 1992 – present

=== Stations ===
- Lakeland Army Air Field, Florida, 21 October 1944 – 16 February 1945
- North Field, Iwo Jima, 25 April–3 December 1945

Air echelon operated from West Field, Tinian, 23 March–11 May 1945

- Camp Anza, California, 15–16 December 1945
- Dow Air Force Base, Maine, 20 January 1953
- Tinker Air Force Base, Oklahoma, 20 March 1955 – 1 April 1959
- Carswell Air Force Base (later Naval Air Station Joint Reserve Base Fort Worth), Texas, 8 July 1972 – present

=== Aircraft ===
- North American P-51 Mustang, 1944–1945
- Republic F-84 Thunderjet, 1953–1957
- North American F-100 Super Sabre, 1957–1958
- Republic F-105 Thunderchief, 1972–1982
- McDonnell F-4 Phantom II, 1981–1991
- General Dynamics F-16 Fighting Falcon, 1990–2023
- Lockheed Martin F-35A, 2024–present
