= 301st Fighter Wing =

301st Fighter Wing

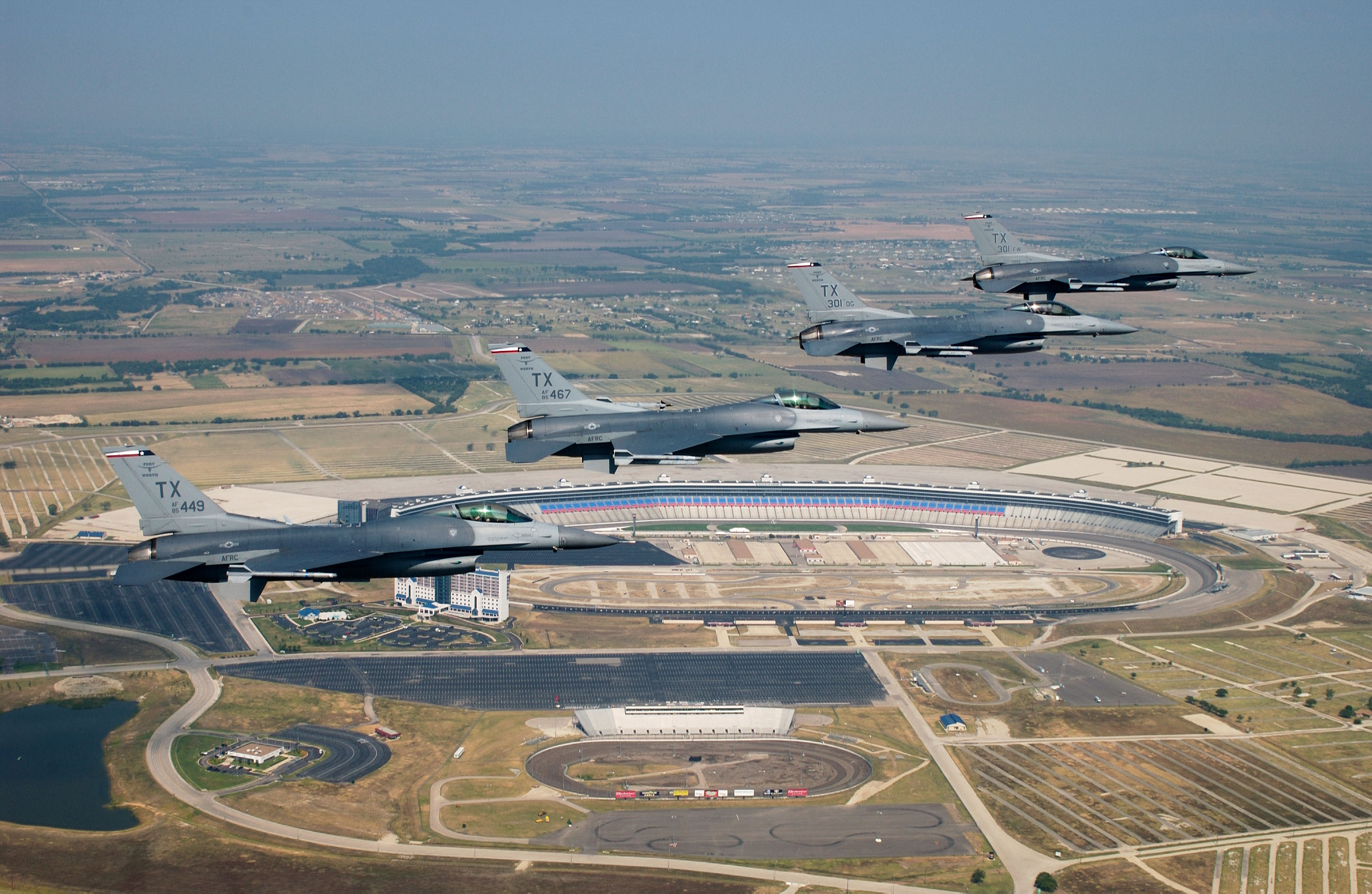
- F-16s of the 457th Fighter Squadron (Note: Aircraft are General Dynamics Block 30A F-16Cs, serials 85-1449, 85–1467, 85–1458 and 85-1472.)
- Active: 1944–1949; 1972–present
- Country: United States
- Branch: United States Air Force
- Type: Wing
- Role: Fighter
- Part of: Air Force Reserve Command
- Garrison/HQ: Naval Air Station Joint Reserve Base Fort Worth, Texas
- Engagements: Asiatic-Pacific Theater
- Decorations: Air Force Outstanding Unit Award

Commanders
- Current commander: Col. Abel Ramos

Insignia
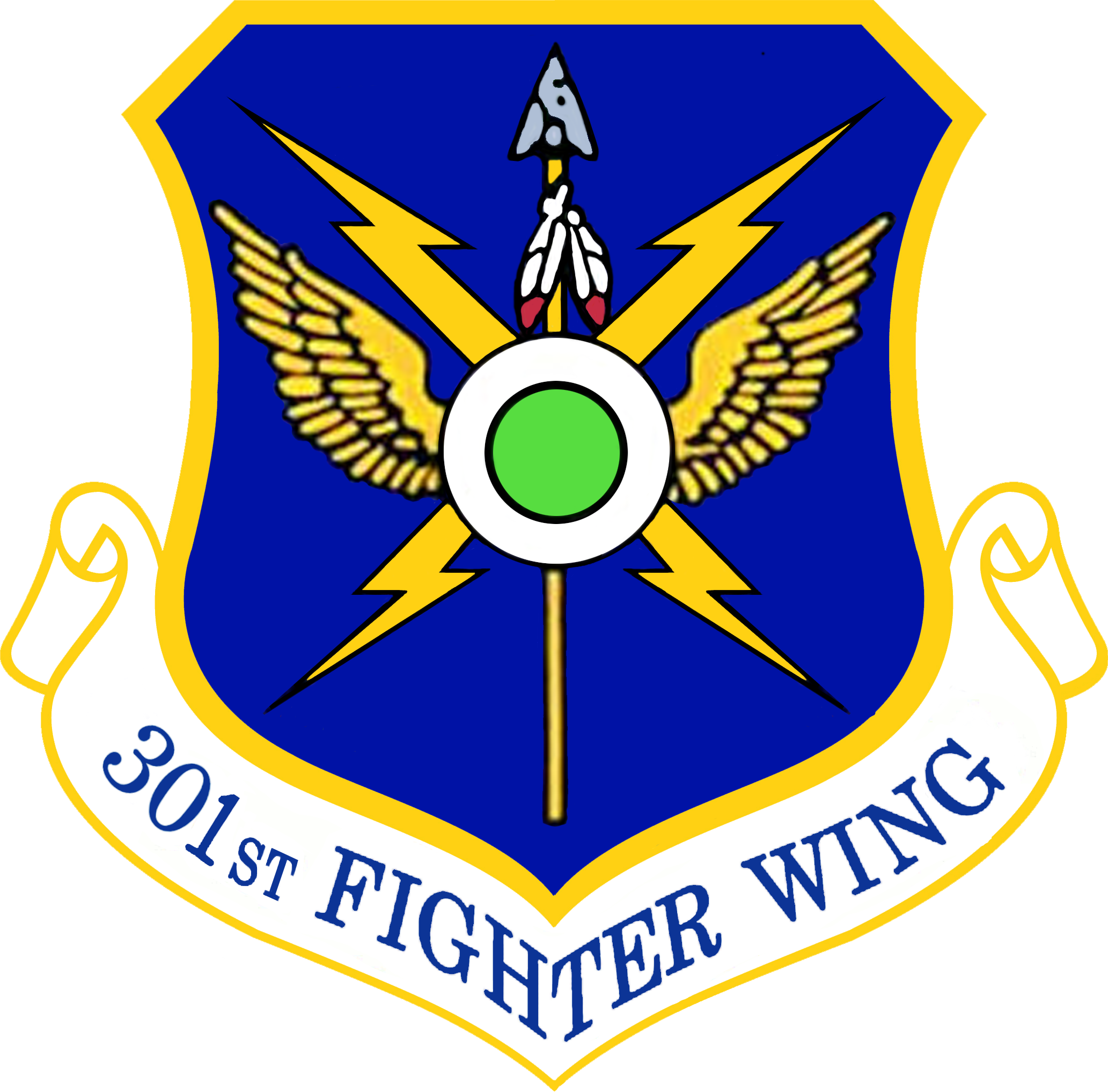
- 301st Fighter Wing emblem (Note: Approved 17 December 1978. Description: Azure two lightning bolts in saltire or behind in pale an Indian spear, head argent, shaft of the second [color mentioned] and feathered proper, overall an annulet argent winged of the second [color mentioned] and encircling a pomme.)
- Tail stripe: Texas flag tail stripe "TX" "Texas Longhorns"
- Tail code: TX

Aircraft flown
- Fighter: Lockheed Martin F-35 Lightning II

The 301st Fighter Wing is an Air Reserve Component of the United States Air Force. It is assigned to the Tenth Air Force, Air Force Reserve Command, stationed at Carswell Field, Naval Air Station Joint Reserve Base Fort Worth, Texas. If mobilized, the Wing is gained by the Air Combat Command.

== Mission ==
The mission of the unit is to maintain a state of readiness to deploy people and their assigned fighter aircraft (the F-16) wherever needed when notified of recall to active duty. Wing people assigned to the 301st Fighter Wing repeatedly demonstrate their flying expertise and professionalism in Air Combat Command, Air Force Reserve Command and NATO exercises designed to emphasize that to retain the country's combat ready posture it must train as it plans to fight.

The wing comes under 10th Air Force, one of the three numbered Air Forces of the Air Force Reserve. If mobilized, the wing would come under Air Combat Command's 12th Air Force.

Day-to-day activities of the wing are managed by full-time air reserve technicians (ARTs) and Department of the Air Force civilians. Ready Reservist assigned to the wing are required to attend unit training assemblies which are scheduled for one weekend each month, plus serve 15 days active duty each year to fulfill their reserve commitment. Since reserve pilots are required to maintain the same degree of readiness as their active duty counterparts, flying activities are scheduled Tuesday through Saturday of each week throughout the year.

The 301st Fighter Wing Commander is Colonel Abel Ramos.

== Units ==
- 301st Operations Group

457th Fighter Squadron (F-35A, Tail Code: TX)
Note: Used Tail Code "TH" when assigned to Carswell AFB (1972–1994)
301st Operations Support Flight

- 44th Fighter Group (Tyndall AFB)

301st Fighter Squadron (F-35A, Tail Code: TY)

- 301st Maintenance Group

301st Maintenance Squadron
301st Aircraft Maintenance Squadron
301st Maintenance Operations Flight

- 301st Mission Support Group

301st Security Forces Squadron
301st Mission Support Squadron
301st Civil Engineer Squadron
301st Logistics Readiness Squadron
301st Communications Squadron
301st Services Flight
73d Aerial Port Squadron

- Wing attached units

301st Medical Squadron

== History ==
The unit's origins begin during World War II, when it was part of Twentieth Air Force. The 301st Fighter Wing's P-47N aircraft flew very long range (VLR) escort missions of B-29 Superfortress bombardment groups against Japan.

=== World War II ===
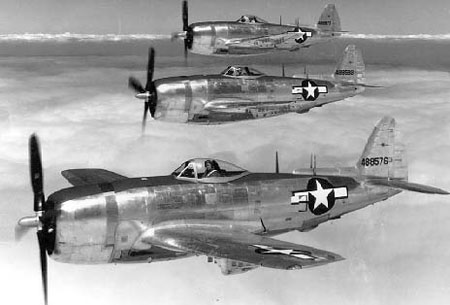
Three-aircraft formation of Republic P-47N Thunderbolts

The 301st Fighter Wing was organized in the United States under First Air Force, initially at Seymour Johnson Field, North Carolina in October 1944, then moved to Mitchel Field on Long Island in November. On Long Island, the wing coordinated the delivery of the very long range Republic P-47N Thunderbolt from its manufacturing plant at Farmingdale, New York, with aircraft being flown to North Carolina where two of the newly assigned groups of the 301st (413th and 414th) were training.

The war in the Pacific required fighter ranges even greater than did operations over Germany, and the mission of the 301st Fighter Wing was to provide bomber escort for Twentieth Air Force Boeing B-29 Superfortress bombers during their strategic bombing missions over Japan in 1945.

Soon after Saipan and Guam were taken with B-29 units being stationed there, the 318th Group formed on the Ryukyu Islands, consisting of six fighter groups, the 15th and 21st (being transferred from Seventh Air Force) and the 413th, 414th, 506th and 507th, all being deployed from the United States. Being the first wing to be equipped with the P-47N, the groups operated as a long-range escort for B-29 Superfortress bombers attacking the Japanese mainland all the way from Saipan to Japan and on many other long, overwater flights.

In July 1945 the 301st was reassigned to the Eighth Air Force with the same mission for Eighth Air Force in the planned Operation Downfall, the invasion of Japan. The atomic bombings of Japan led to the Japanese surrender before Eighth Air Force saw action in the Pacific theater.

The wing was reassigned to Far East Air Forces when Eighth Air Force returned to the United States in 1946. Its four wartime fighter groups returned to the United States early in 1946, being replaced by the 51st Fighter Group as its operational unit. It served as part of the Army of Occupation on Okinawa. The wing performed air defense role over the Ryukyu Islands. After 18 August 1948, the wing had no units assigned and existed as a paper unit until inactivated on 20 January 1949.

=== Cold War ===
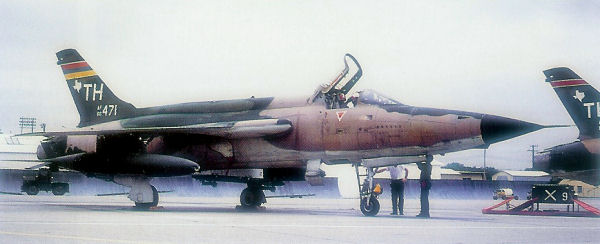
Wing Republic F-105 (Note: Aircraft is Republic F-105D-10-RE Thunderchief 60-0471 modified to the "Thunderstick II" configuration, May 1981. The multiple color tail stripe indicates this is the Wing Commander's aircraft. This aircraft was sent to the Military Aircraft Storage and Disposal Center on 13 November 1981. Today, the aircraft is waiting restoration at the Yanks Air Museum, Chino, California.)

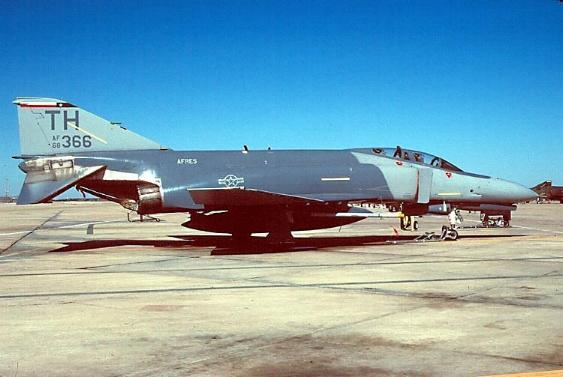
Wing McDonnell F-4E (Note: Aircraft is McDonnell Douglas F-4E-38-MC Phantom 68-366 about 1985. Upon its retirement in May 1990, this aircraft was first sent to Sheppard Air Force Base as a GF-4E ground maintenance trainer, then placed on static display at the Commemorative Air Force Museum at Midland, Texas as part of their Vietnam Memorial.)

The 301st was reactivated in July 1972 as the 301st Tactical Fighter Wing at Carswell Air Force Base, Texas in the United States Air Force Reserve. Upon reactivation the wing was assigned the Republic F-105 Thunderchief, with the Carswell-based 457th Fighter Squadron using specially modified version of the F-105D called the "Thunderstick II". The 301st Fighter Wing led the way for Air Force Reserve fighter units in deploying to overseas bases for NATO exercises when it deployed to Norvenich Air Base, Germany, in August 1977 and Gioia del Colle Air Base, Italy, in May 1979.

In 1981, the wing converted to the McDonnell Douglas F-4D Phantom II. Subsequent overseas deployments by the 301st Fighter Wing included Cigli Air Base, Turkey, in October 1982. A deployment to Sivrihisar Air Base, Turkey, in May 1985 was an AFRES first when they operated under bare base conditions. The unit also deployed to Homestead Air Force Base, Florida, Roosevelt Roads Naval Air Station in Puerto Rico, Nellis Air Force Base, Nevada, and Elmendorf Air Force Base, Alaska. In 1987 the unit began swapping to the newer F-4E Phantom II. During Operation Desert Shield/Desert Storm, many wing people were recalled to active duty and served at various locations throughout the United States, Germany, England, and Southwest Asia.

In April 1991, the wing converted to the F-16C/D, "Fighting Falcon".

=== Post Cold War ===
In December 1993, the wing deployed six F-16s, (along with six from the 944th Fighter Wing at Luke Air Force Base, Arizona), and approximately 350 wing people to Aviano Air Base, Italy, in support of United Nations Operation Deny Flight mission. Due to the wing converting from the F-4 to the F-16 fighter aircraft during Desert Shield/Storm, this voluntary deployment to Aviano AB was the first non-exercise operational aviation deployment since flying fighters out of Carswell in 1972. Due to achieving the highest rating possible from the May 1994 Operational Readiness Inspection and supporting the Deny Flight mission, the 301st Fighter Wing was awarded as an Air Force outstanding unit for the period May 1992 to May 1994.

In May and June 1997, the wing deployed to Karup Air Base, Denmark. The wing joined forces with three U.S. Air Force units and foreign air forces in two separate exercises while in Denmark. The first was the command and control Exercise Central Enterprise. The second exercise was called BALTOPS (Baltic Operations).

In May 1998, the wing deployed with six Air Force Reserve aircraft to fly Operation Southern Watch sorties from Ahmad al-Jaber Air Base, Kuwait.

=== Twenty-first century ===
Elements of the 301st Fighter Wing deployed in October 2001 to the Middle East as part of a regularly scheduled Air Expeditionary Force rotation to enforce the no-fly zone over southern Iraq. While there, the reservists also began flying combat missions as part of the United States invasion of Afghanistan. Throughout the 90-day deployment, the reservists flew between nine and 15 hours a day.

In its 2005 BRAC Recommendations, DoD recommended to realign Hill Air Force Base. It would distribute nine of the 419th Fighter Wing F-16s to the 301st Fighter Wing. In 2007 the wing gained another eight aircraft from the 192d Fighter Wing of the Virginia Air National Guard bringing its total to 32 airplanes.

On December 4, 2023, 301st Fighter Wing's 457th Fighter Squadron transferred its last F-16C to the 706th Aggressor Squadron at Nellis Air Force Base.

=== F-35 Era ===
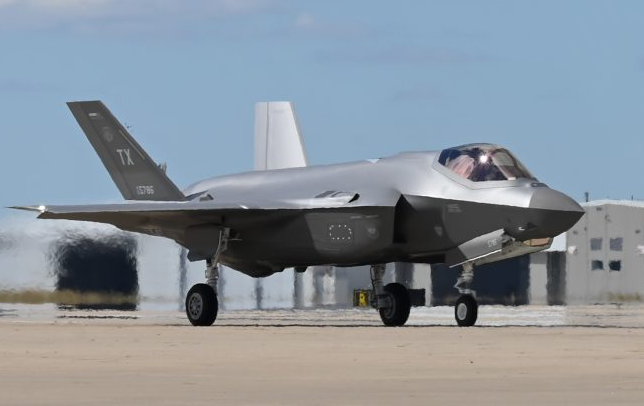
First F-35 assigned to the 301st Wing

On August 14, 2024, the wing received the first of four Lockheed Martin F-35 Lightning IIs loaned to them by the 388th Fighter Wing to begin operations with the new fighter. A total of 26 Lightning IIs will eventually be assigned to the unit. The 301st will be the only Air Force Reserve Command unit to operate the fifth-generation fighter without being associated to an active unit and the second Air Force Reserve F-35 unit. F-35A deliveries to the wing are expected until 2026. The wing accepted its first "own" F-35 on 5 November 2024.

== Lineage ==
- Constituted as the 301st Fighter Wing on 5 October 1944
- Activated on 15 October 1944

Inactivated on 20 January 1949

- Redesignated 301st Tactical Fighter Wing on 19 May 1972

Activated in the Reserve on 1 July 1972
Redesignated 301st Fighter Wing on 1 February 1992

=== Assignments ===
- First Air Force ( Attached to I Fighter Command, 15 October 1944)
- Twentieth Air Force, 21 May 1945 (Attached to Army Air Forces, Pacific Ocean Area, 21 May 1945, Seventh Air Force, 1 Jun – 14 August 1945)
- Eighth Air Force, 15 August 1945
- 1st Air Division, 7 June 1946
- Thirteenth Air Force, 1 December 1948 – 20 January 1949
- Central Air Force Reserve Region, 1 July 1972
- Tenth Air Force, 8 October 1976 – present

=== Components ===
Groups

- 15th Fighter Group: attached 25 November 1945 – 1 January 1946, assigned 1 January 1946 – 1 March 1946
- 21st Fighter Group: assigned 3 July 1944 – 10 November 1944, attached 10 November 1944 – February 1945
- 51st Fighter Group: 15 October 1946 – 18 August 1948
- 301st Operations Group, 1 August 1992 – present
- 318th Fighter Group: attached 21 May – November 1945
- 413th Fighter Group: 28 October 1944 – 15 October 1946
- 414th Fighter Group: 28 October 1944 – 17 April 1945
- 506th Fighter Group: 8 July 1972 – 25 March 1973
- 507th Fighter Group: 26 June 1945 – 27 May 1946, 25 July 1972 – 25 March 1973, 17 October 1975 – 1 October 1982
- 508th Fighter Group: 1 January – 25 March 1973, 17 October 1975 – 1 October 1982
- 924th Fighter Group: 1 October 1981 – 1 October 1994
- 926th Fighter Group: 1 August 1992 – 1 October 1994
- 945th Military Airlift Group: 1 July 1972 – 1 January 1973

Squadrons

- 305th Fighter Control Squadron: 1 December 1945 – 17 August 1948
- 418th Night Fighter Squadron: 20 March 1946 – 20 February 1947
- 457th Fighter Squadron: 25 March 1973 – 1 August 1992
- 465th Fighter Squadron: 25 March 1973 – 17 October 1975
- 466th Fighter Squadron: 25 March 1973 – 17 October 1975
- 548th Night Fighter Squadron: attached 8 June – 14 July 1945

=== Stations ===
- Seymour Johnson Field, North Carolina, 15 October 1944
- Mitchel Field, New York, 1 November 1944 – 30 May 1945
- Ie Shima Airfield, Okinawa, 31 July 1945
- Kadena Airfield, Okinawa, 29 November 1945
- Naha Airfield, Okinawa, 14 August 1947 – 20 January 1949
- Carswell Air Force Base (later Carswell Air Reserve Base, Naval Air Station Joint Reserve Base Fort Worth), 1 July 1972 – present
