= Carswell Air Force Base =

United States Air Force base in Texas

- Fort Worth, Texas in the United States
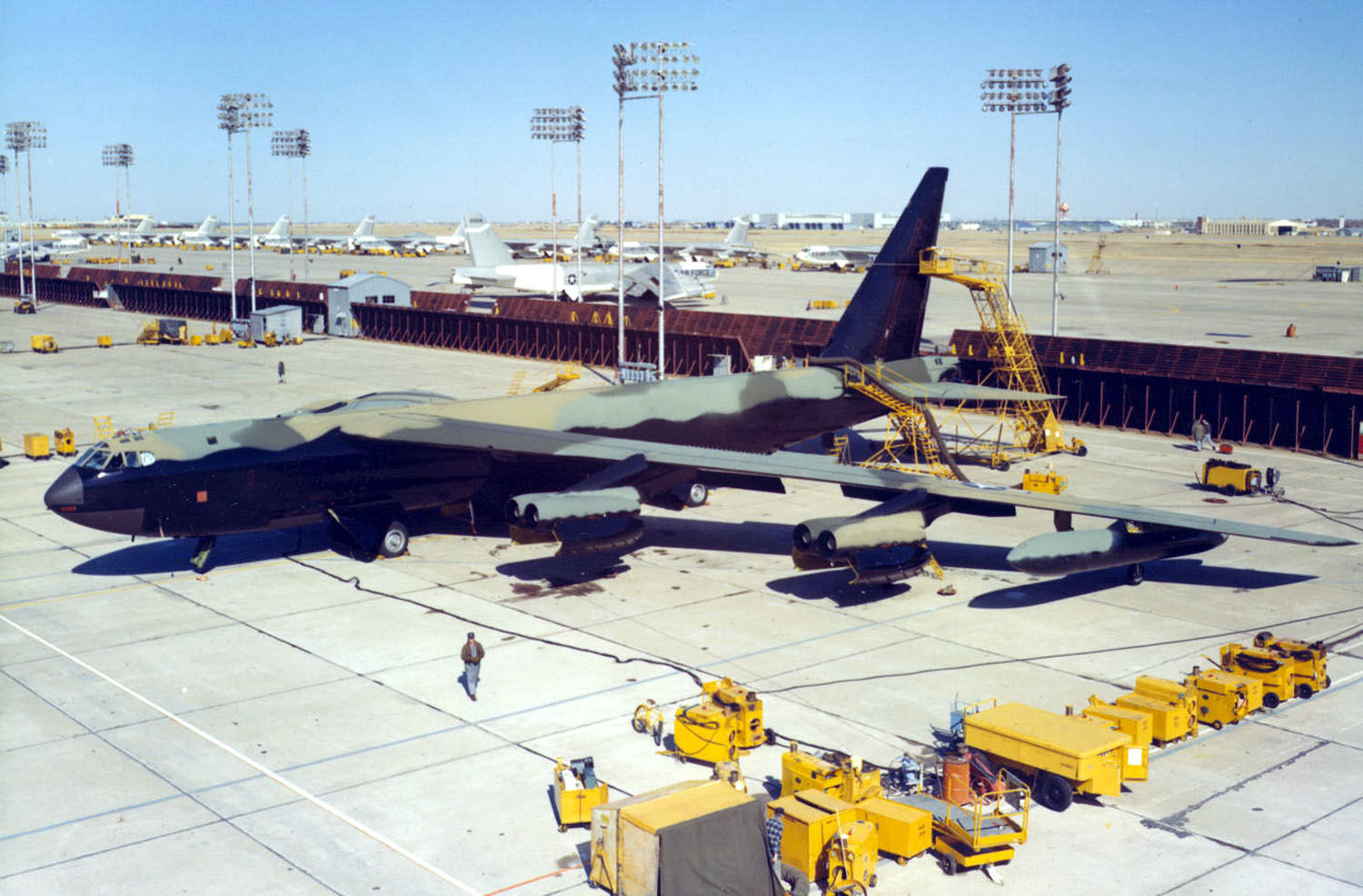
- Boeing B-52 Stratofortresses at Carswell AFB in 1983

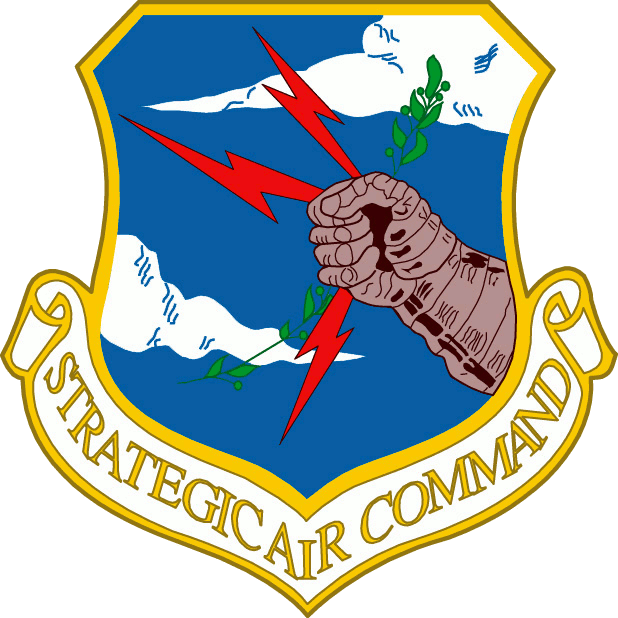

Site information
- Owner: Department of Defense
- Operator: US Air Force
- Controlled by: Strategic Air Command (1946–1992); Air Combat Command (1992–1994)
- Condition: Closed

Location
- Location within Texas Location within the United States
- Coordinates: 32°46′09″N 097°26′30″W

Site history
- Built: 1941
- In use: 1942–1993
- Fate: Redesignated as Carswell Air Reserve Station in 1993 and then realigned to the US Navy as Naval Air Station Joint Reserve Base Fort Worth in 1994

Garrison information
- Garrison: 7th Bombardment Wing

Carswell Air Force Base is a former United States Air Force (USAF) base, located northwest of Fort Worth, Texas. For most of its operational lifetime, the base's mission was to train and support heavy strategic bombing groups and wings.

Carswell was a major Strategic Air Command (SAC) base during the Cold War. It was the headquarters of several SAC intercontinental bombardment wings, equipped with the latest heavy bombers from B-29 Superfortresses; B-36 Peacemakers and B-52 Stratofortresses. The west side of the airfield is home to United States Air Force Plant 4, a 602-acre (2.44 km^{2}) industrial complex occupied over the decades by Convair, General Dynamics, and now by Lockheed Martin. The bulk of the Air Force Convair B-36, B-58 Hustler, General Dynamics F-111 Aardvark, EF-111 Raven and F-16 Fighting Falcon fleets were built there. The F-35 Lightning II aircraft for the Air Force, Navy, Marine Corps, and various NATO and Allied partner nations is currently built there.

With the end of the Cold War and the subsequent downsizing of the American military, the Base Realignment and Closure (BRAC) Commission of 1991 recommended that Carswell AFB be closed by 1994. In lieu of outright closure, the majority of the installation was transferred to the U.S. Navy for use as a naval air station to replace the nearby Naval Air Station Dallas that was also being closed due to BRAC action.

Today, the facility is known as Naval Air Station Joint Reserve Base Fort Worth / Carswell Field. It retains an Air Force Reserve Command presence from its previous status as an air force base that includes the headquarters for an Air Force Reserve numbered air force and a tenant Air Force Reserve fighter wing. The installation also hosts tenant Navy Reserve, Marine Corps Reserve, Army Reserve and Texas Air National Guard flying units which were formerly located at Naval Air Station Dallas. On the base's grounds is the Federal Medical Center, Carswell, the only federal medical center the Bureau of Prisons operates solely for women.

== History ==
Carswell Air Force Base was named after Medal of Honor recipient Major Horace S. Carswell, Jr. (1916–1944). Major Carswell was returning from an attack on Japanese shipping in the South China Sea on 26 October 1944. He attempted to save a crewmember whose parachute had been destroyed by flak. He remained at the controls of his crippled bomber and died while crash-landing the B-24 Liberator near Tungchen, China. The base was renamed in his honor on 29 January 1948.

=== Origins ===
Carswell's origins date back to the early years of aviation. After the United States' entry into World War I in April 1917, General John J. "Blackjack" Pershing invited the British Royal Flying Corps (RFC) to establish training fields in the southern United States where the warmer weather would be more conducive for flying year-round. In June, the War Department inspected 6 sites around Fort Worth, Texas which had been offered by the Chamber of Commerce. In August the War Department signed leases with the RFC on 3 sites around Fort Worth. Known as the Flying Triangle, these sites were Hicks Field (#1), Barron Field (#2), and Benbrook (later Carruthers) Field (#3) based on their locations. In April 1918 these airfields were turned over to the Air Service, United States Army as training fields for American pilots. Hundreds of pilots learned their basic and primary flying skills at these airfields in the Fort Worth area during the war. They were closed in 1919 when the war ended.

In 1940 the City of Fort Worth had filed an application with the Civil Aeronautics Administration (CAA), asking for a primary pilot training airfield for the Army Air Corps. In May, General Jacob E. Fickel visited Fort Worth on an inspection visit. Fickel had learned to fly at Carruthers Field in 1918. At the same time, the Fort Worth Chamber of Commerce was trying to convince aircraft manufacturers to build an aircraft assembly plant in the area. Consolidated Aircraft, wanting to build in the area, suggested to the Air Corps that they jointly build an airfield adjacent to the heavy bomber plant they wanted to build in Fort Worth. On 16 June 1941, President Franklin D. Roosevelt approved $1.75 million to construct an airfield next to the Consolidated manufacturing plant. The Army wanted to have the airfield ready quickly before the plant was put into production and construction of the Lake Worth Bomber Plant Airport began almost immediately.

=== World War II ===
However, after the Attack on Pearl Harbor, the Army changed its plans and instead of being an operational base, Tarrant Field, as the facility was called, became a heavy bomber training school. The first unit assigned to the base was the Army Air Forces Training Command Combat Crew School on 1 July 1942. At the same time, the Consolidated plant began assembly of B-24D Liberator aircraft in May, with the first aircraft being assigned to the school in August. On 29 July, the base was again renamed as Fort Worth Army Air Field (Fort Worth AAF).

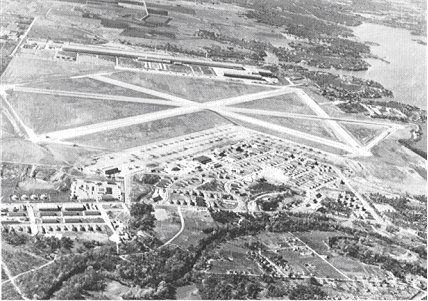
Oblique airphoto of Fort Worth Army Air Field in 1945, looking east to west. The airfield technical area is on the east side of the main north–south runway, with the Consolidated-Vultee aircraft manufacturing facilities (later Convair) on the west side.

The Army Air Forces Combat Crew School (later re-designated Army Air Forces Pilot School, Specialized 4-Engine) took graduates of Training Command's advanced pilot training schools and experienced 2-engine pilots and trained them on flying the B-24 Liberator. The school was officially opened on 12 October 1942 and was under the jurisdiction of the 34th Flying Training Wing at San Angelo Army Airfield, Texas. The school was initially equipped with B-24Ds that were assembled across the runway at Consolidated, later it was upgraded to B-24Es that were manufactured at Consolidated's Willow Run Plant in Michigan, then flown to the Fort Worth plant for final modifications.

During training, nine-member crews were assigned to each plane, and the crews ate, slept, and trained together 24-hours a day. This allowed the crew to learn both the technical skills needed for aircraft operation as well as the other crew members' minds and reactions. Each day they trained five hours in the air and five hours on the ground. Each class lasted four and a half weeks. Training officials added a Bomb Approach School in October 1943, which incorporated teamwork between a pilot and bombardier. In addition, the 9000th WAC Company of the Women's Army Corps were used in the control tower as well as in the communications office of the base.

In late 1944, the B-24 training was phased out at Fort Worth AAF, being replaced with a B-32 Dominator Flight Crew Conversion Training School. Training Command instructor pilots were flown to the Consolidated manufacturing plant in San Diego to learn about the Dominator, which was planned as a stablemate of the B-29 Superfortress; much like the B-17 Flying Fortress was teamed with the B-24 Liberator. The first B-32 arrived at Fort Worth in September 1944, however it was in the modification plant until January before it was released to the training school. By the end of 1944, only five production aircraft had been delivered by Consolidated; by comparison, the B-29 had been flown in combat for nearly six months. The Army was quite unhappy about the Dominator and the production problems it was experiencing.

Eventually, 40 TB-32 trainers were produced for the training program to get underway. Prospective B-32 pilots underwent 50 hours of training in the TB-32s and co-pilots received 25 hours of flight time and 25 hours of observer training. Ultimately, a shortage of equipment meant the B-32 training at Fort Worth was never fully realized and after V-J Day, officials eliminated the B-32 training program.

=== Strategic Air Command ===
==== Postwar era ====
In November 1945, the jurisdiction of Fort Worth AAF was transferred to Second Air Force, which established its 17th Bombardment Operational Training Wing at the base, equipped with B-29A Superfortresses. The Air Force had decided to keep Fort Worth as a permanent airfield and in 1946, constructed an 8,200-ft north–south extra heavy-duty runway for future use. The number of completed B-32s at the Consolidated plant had reached 74 production aircraft, along with the TB-32 trainers; many of which were parked at the field. These were ordered flown from Fort Worth directly to storage at Davis-Monthan and Kingman Fields, Arizona for disposal, and the partially assembled B-32 aircraft in the plant were ordered scrapped in place.

===== 7th Bombardment Group =====
Fort Worth AAF was assigned to the newly formed Strategic Air Command in March 1946, and on 1 October 1946, the 7th Bombardment Group, Very Heavy was activated. With its activation, the 7th became part of the Fifteenth Air Force (15 AF), headquartered at Colorado Springs, Colorado. Personnel and aircraft of the new group, consisting of the Boeing B-29 Superfortress, were transferred to Fort Worth AAF from the 92nd Bombardment Group at Spokane AAF, Washington. On 1 November 1946, the Eighth Air Force moved its headquarters to Fort Worth AAF from MacDill Field, Florida.

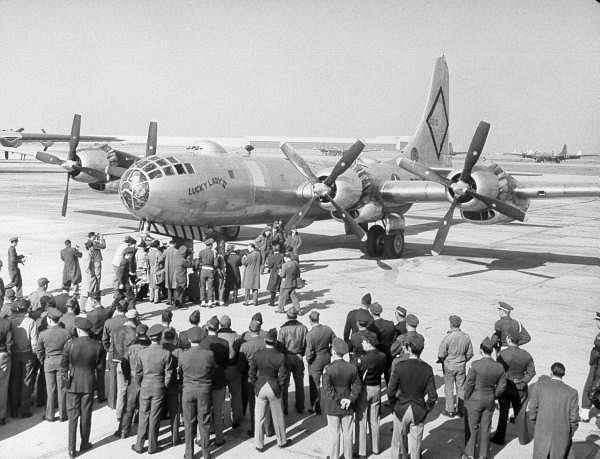
B-50 Superfortress Lucky Lady II preparing to take off from Carswell AFB Texas for the first circumnavigation of the world, 1949

With its B-29s, the 7th prepared its people for any combat eventuality that might arise, flying simulated bombing missions over various cities. On 5 July 1947, a flight of eight B-29s of the 492nd Bomb Squadron deployed from Fort Worth AAF to Yokota AB, Japan. Shortly after this, the detachment received orders to redeploy to Fort Worth AAF via Washington, D.C. The aircraft left Yokota AB on 2 August, flew over the Aleutian Islands, then into Anchorage, Alaska. From Anchorage the flight flew over Edmonton, Alberta, Canada, turned south and flew over Minnesota and Wisconsin. The bombers flew a low-level flight between The Pentagon and Washington Monument in the Capitol on 3 August. Completing this aerial demonstration, they headed for Fort Worth, landing 31 hours after launch from Japan and covering 7,086 miles.

On 12 September, the group deployed 30 B-29s to Giebelstadt Army Airfield, near Würzburg, West Germany. This flight was the largest bomber formation flown from Fort Worth AAF overseas to date, landing in Germany on 13 September. During their ten-day stay, the group bombers participated in training operations over Europe, as well as a show-of-force display by the United States in the early part of the Cold War with the Soviet Union. The flight redeployed from Germany on 23 September.

On 13 January 1948, Fort Worth AAF was renamed as Griffiss Air Force Base. On 29 January, the name was changed again, this time to Carswell Air Force Base. (Note: That same day, the Griffiss Air Force Base name was reassigned to Rome Army Air Field in Rome, New York.)

In February 1949, a B-50 Superfortress (developed from the famed B-29) and named Lucky Lady II took off from Carswell for the first nonstop flight around the world. She returned to Carswell after mid-air refueling, flying 23,108 miles, and remaining aloft for ninety-four hours and one minute.

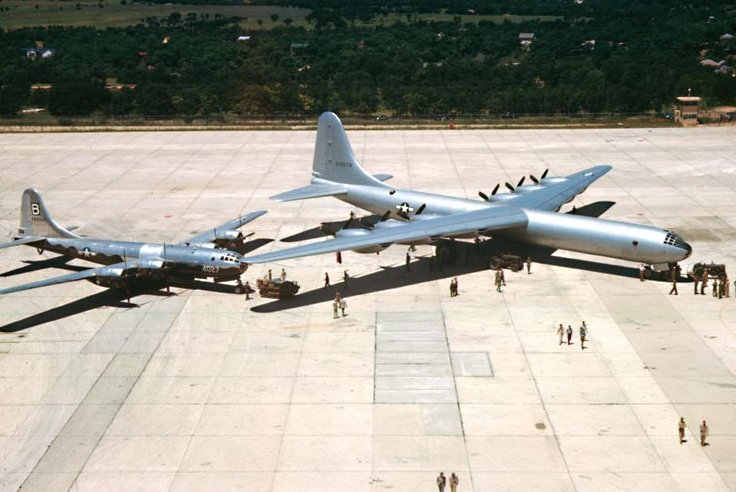
Arrival of the first B-36A at Carswell "City of Fort Worth" (AF Serial No. 44-92015), in June 1948

Since 1942, the XB-36 Peacemaker had been under development by Consolidated, and work on it was shifted from its San Diego, California plant to its government-leased plant in Fort Worth. By 1947 the initial production version B-36A was ready and in June 1948 the first Convair B-36A Peacemaker was delivered.

The first B-36A was designated the "City of Fort Worth" (AF Serial No. 44-92015), and was assigned to the 492d Bomb Squadron. B-36s continued to roll out from the production plant throughout 1948 and being assigned to the 7th. The group's last B-29 being transferred on 6 December to the 97th Bomb Group at Biggs AFB. For 10 years, the "Peacemaker" cast a large shadow on the Iron Curtain and served as the nation's major deterrent weapons system.

In January 1951, the 7th took part in a special training mission to the United Kingdom. The purpose of the mission was to evaluate the B-36D under simulated war plan conditions. Also, to evaluate further the equivalent airspeed and compression tactics for heavy bombardment aircraft. The aircraft, staging through Limestone AFB, Maine, would land at RAF Lakenheath, the United Kingdom, following a night radar bombing attack on Heligoland, West Germany. From there the bombers would conduct a simulated bomb run on the Heston Bomb Plot, London, finally landing at RAF Lakenheath.

This was the first deployment of wing and SAC B-36 aircraft to England and Europe. For the next four days, the flight flew sorties out of England. The aircraft redeployed to the states on 20 January arriving at Carswell on 21 January.

On 16 February 1951 the 7th became a paper organization. With all assigned flying squadrons reassigned directly to the 7th Bombardment Wing as part of the Tri-Deputate organization plan adopted by the wing. The group inactivated on 16 June 1952.

===== 11th Bombardment Group =====
On 1 December 1948, the 11th Bombardment Group was reactivated by SAC at Carswell AFB and was equipped with B-36s. 7th Bomb Group personnel began training the new 11th group people in the new aircraft and the 11th soon began receiving them.

==== Cold War ====
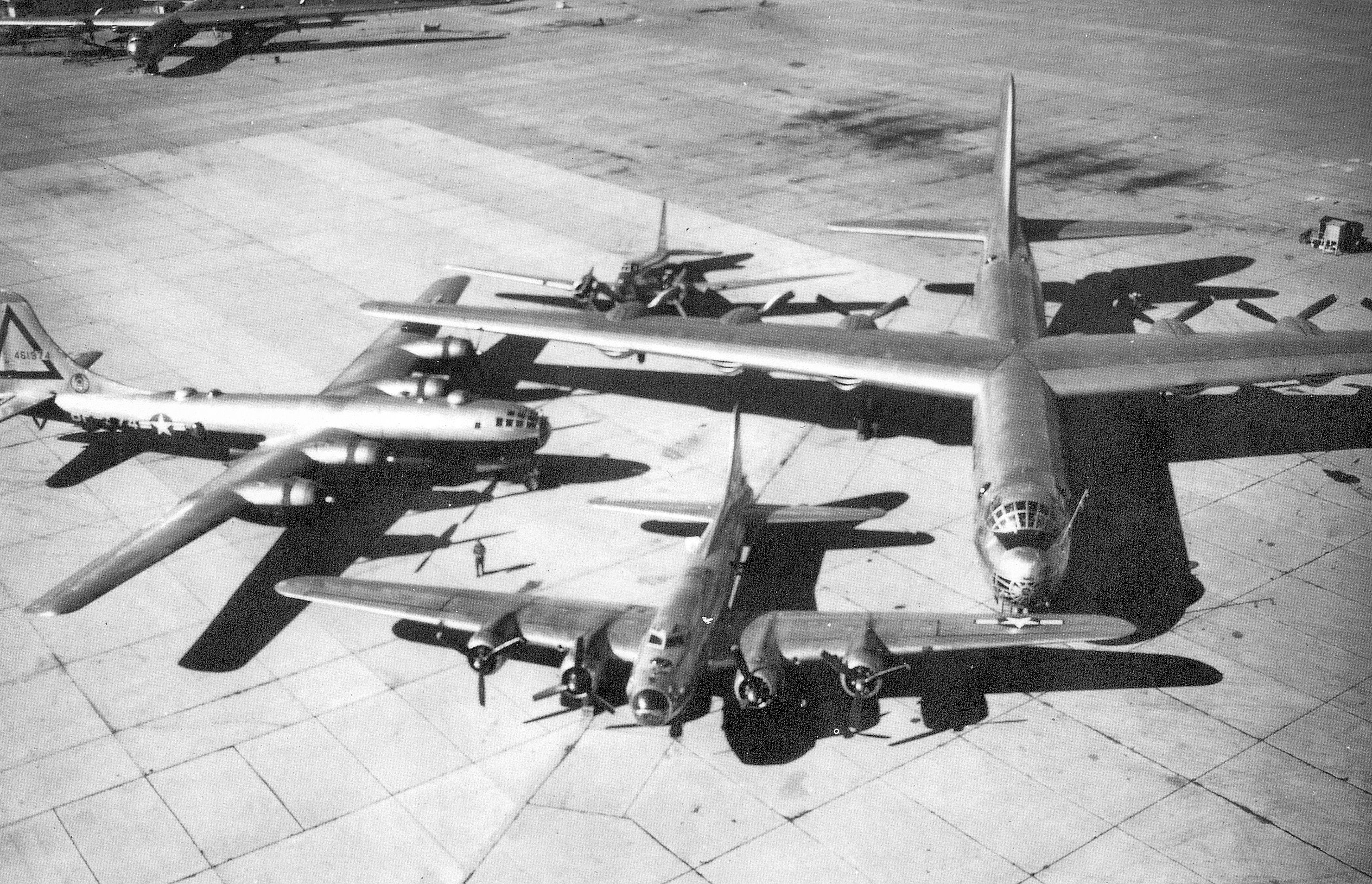
Special photo of Air Force bombers from the 1930s through the late 1940s. A Douglas B-18 "Bolo"; a Boeing B-17 "Flying Fortress"; a Boeing "B-29 Superfortress" and the B-36 "Peacemaker" dominating the group photo with a 230 Ft Wingspan. Taken at Carswell AFB after receipt of the first B-36 in 1948. Note the SAC 7th Bombardment Wing marking on the B-29.

In 1947, shortly after the United States Air Force was established as a separate branch of the United States military, the Hobson Wing-Base Organization Plan was implemented. The 7th was selected as one of the "Test Wings" to evaluate the new organization T/O and on 17 November 1947 the 7th Bombardment Wing was established. The test was successful and the wing was made permanent on 1 August 1948. As part of the new organization both the 7th and 11th Bombardment Groups became its operational component.

On 16 February 1951 the 11th Bombardment Wing was activated and the group was assigned to it. The 19th Air Division was organized the same day at Carswell. With this move the division assumed responsibility for the 7th and 11th Bomb Wings at Carswell.

===== 7th Bombardment Wing =====
====== B-36 Peacemaker Era ======
The wing's mission was to prepare for global strategic bombardment in the event of hostilities. Under various designations, the 7th Bomb Wing flew a wide variety of aircraft at the base until its inactivation in 1993.

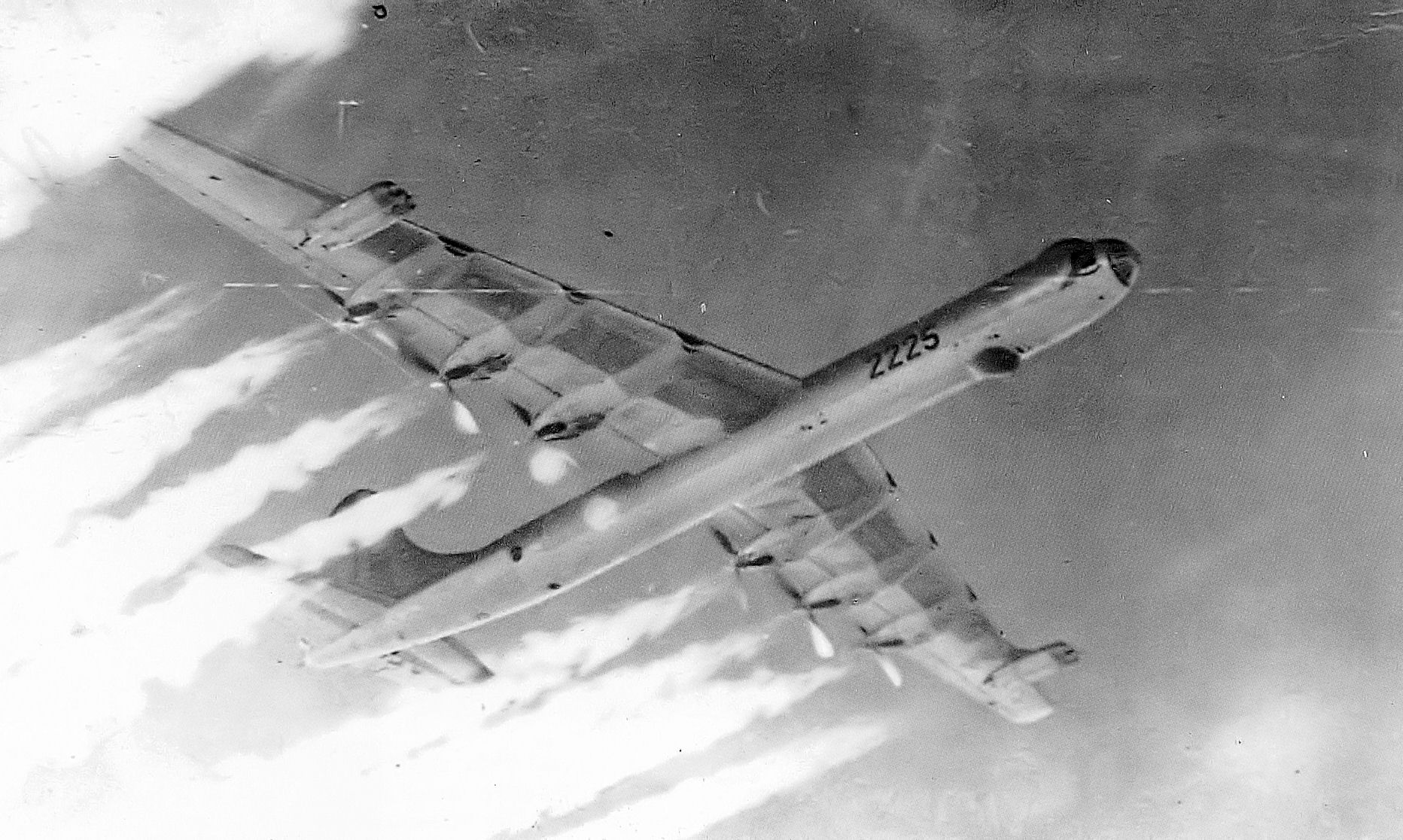
11th Bombardment Group Convair B-36J-5-CF Peacemaker 52-2225 showing "Six turnin', four burnin", 1955

A five-ship B-36 formation was flown on 15 January 1949, in an air review over Washington, D.C., commemorating the inauguration of the President of the United States, Harry S. Truman.

In 1954, Carswell was prominently featured and used as a filming location in the James Stewart and June Allyson film Strategic Air Command. 11th Bomb Group B-36s appeared with James Stewart who was also attached to the unit in the 1950s as a reserve commander.

On 13 June 1955, the Strategic Air Command realigned its three numbered air forces resulting in Headquarters, 8 AF moving from Carswell to Westover AFB, Massachusetts. With that move, Carswell was reassigned under Second Air Force (2 AF), headquartered at Barksdale AFB, Louisiana.

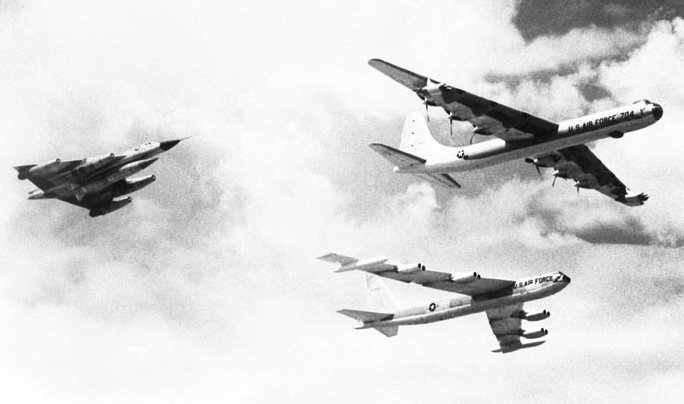
Last B-36 flight from Carswell, 30 May 1958, flying in formation with a Convair YB-58 and Boeing B-52

On 16 February 1951, the 11th Bombardment Wing was activated and the group was assigned to it, although all group resources were transferred to the wing until the group was inactivated in June 1952. The wing deployed to Nouasseur AB, French Morocco from 4 May until 2 July 1955. The Wing won the SAC Bombing Competition and the Fairchild Trophy in 1954, 1956 and 1960. 7–11 must have been considered a lucky combination, because the two wings continued to share Carswell Air Force base until 13 December 1957, when the 11th moved to Altus AFB, Oklahoma, and began receiving B-52 Stratofortresses.

In January 1958, the wing began transferring its B-36 bombers to various SAC wings. On 20 January, the wing transferred all B-52 equipment and property on hand to the 4123rd Strategic Wing in order to facilitate that organization's conversion, which was scheduled several months ahead of the 7th Bomb Wing at Carswell. On 30 May, Memorial Day, the last of the B-36's in the wing were retired with appropriate ceremonies and "Open House". Air Force and civilian personnel of the base, and civilians from surrounding communities were on hand to bid the "Peacemaker" a fond farewell. This last flight of a B-36 phased out completely the B-36 program in the wing.

====== B-52 Stratofortress and KC-135 Stratotanker Era ======
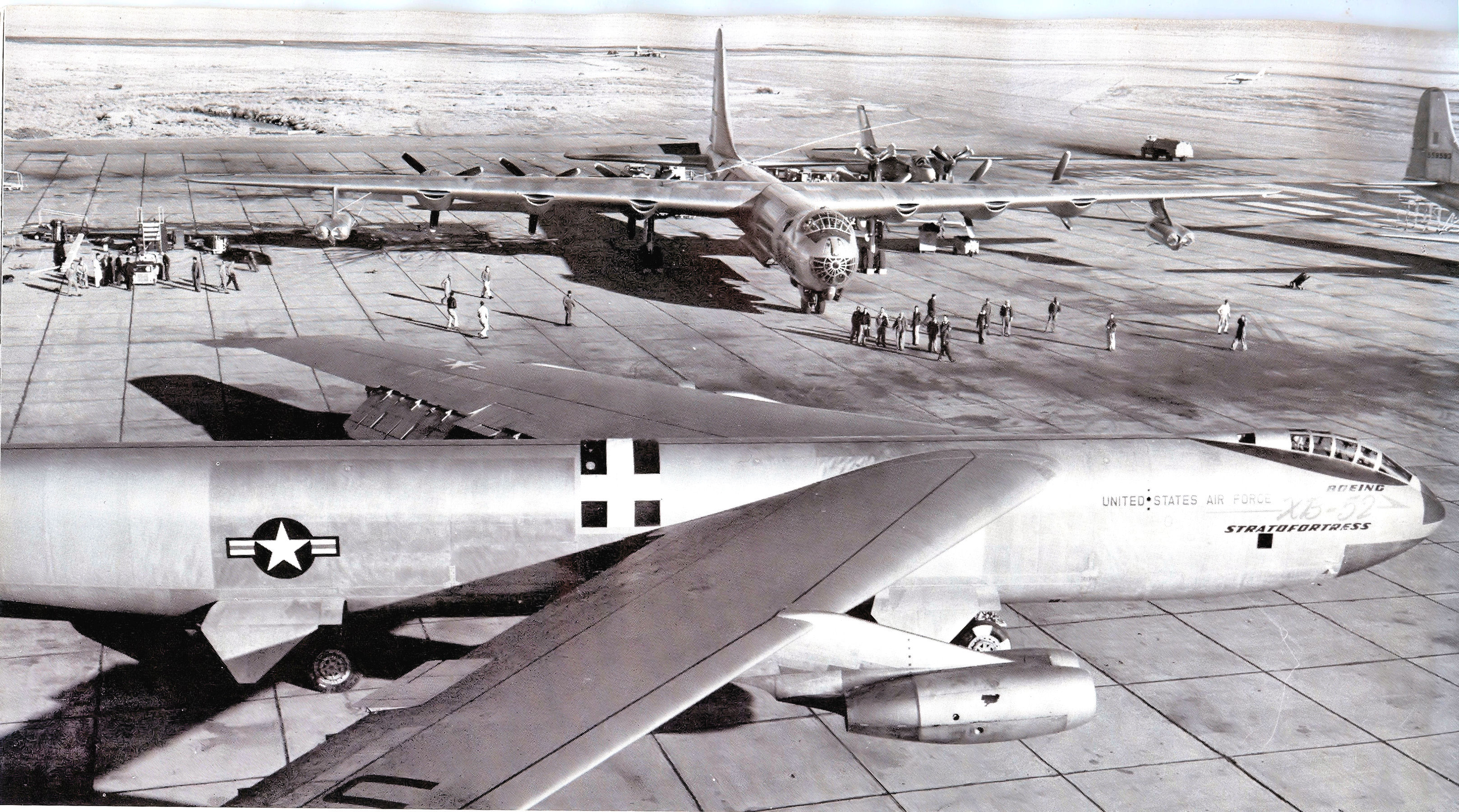
YB-52 prototype bomber at Carswell AFB, 1955 shown with a 7th Bomb Wing B-36

On 10 December 1957, the 98th Bomb Squadron was detached from the wing and assigned to the newly activated 4123rd Strategic Wing at Carswell. This would become the first Boeing B-52 Stratofortress unit at Carswell. The 7th Bomb Wing officially became a B-52 organization with the adoption of manning documents and equipping authorizations on 1 February 1958.

On 19 February 1958, the 4123d Strategic Wing took possession of the first Boeing B-52 Stratofortress on Carswell. At the arrival ceremony on base, the bomber was named "The City of Fort Worth". It was subsequently assigned to the 98th Bombardment Squadron of the wing. Shortly following the arrival of B-52 bombers to the 4123rd Strategic Wing, the unit was moved to new facilities at Clinton-Sherman AFB, Oklahoma. With the acquisition of the Boeing B-52 Stratofortress, all new B-52 wings would operate with an air refueling squadron to support those bombers.

As a result, SAC activated the 7th Air Refueling Squadron at Carswell on 1 April 1958 and assigned it to the wing. The squadron would be equipped with the Boeing KC-135 Stratotanker later in the year. With the disestablishment of the Strategic Air Command in 1992, the 7th Air Refueling Squadron and its KC-135As were reassigned to the newly established Air Mobility Command (AMC) and the 19th Air Refueling Wing, Robins AFB, Georgia, but remained as Det. 1 at Carswell AFB until the squadron was disestablished later in 1992. Most of the 7th's KC-135As were retired to AMARG, while 55-3130, the oldest KC-135 then flying retired to the Air Force Museum at March AFB, California. A few of the 7th's KC-135As were delivered to Boeing-Wichita at McConnell AFB to be converted to the KC-135R configuration.

In early 1992, SAC was ordered by AFCOS General McPeak to ground all B-52 Tail Gunners and remove the tail guns from all B-52s that were to remain in the USAF inventory. The 20mm Guns were removed from the Carswell AFB and Minot AFB based B-52Hs, while all B-52Gs kept their quad .50 caliber M-3 BMGs because they were all programmed for retirement to Davis Monthan AFB and its 309th Aerospace Maintenance and Regeneration Group (309th AMARG).

In January 1959. B-52s from Carswell were constantly in the air and flying to Europe, Asia, and North Africa.

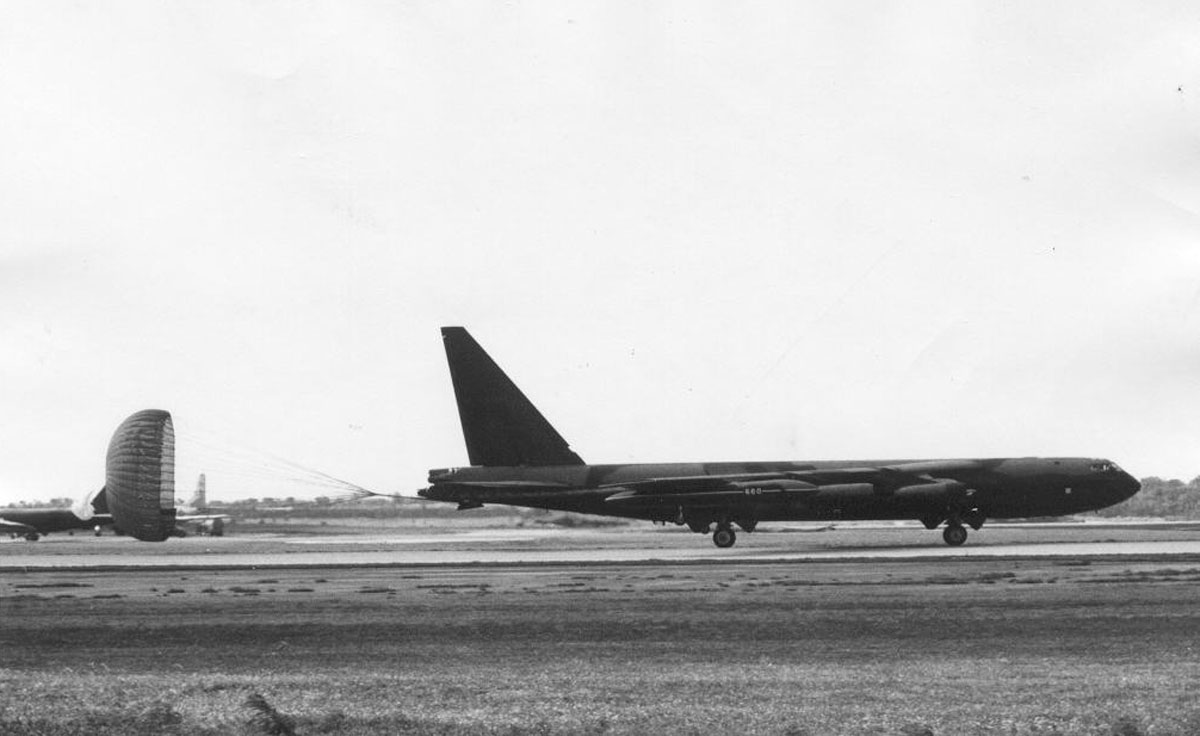
Boeing B-52D-30-BW AF Serial No. 56-0660 at Andersen Air Force Base, Guam, on 5 April 1966

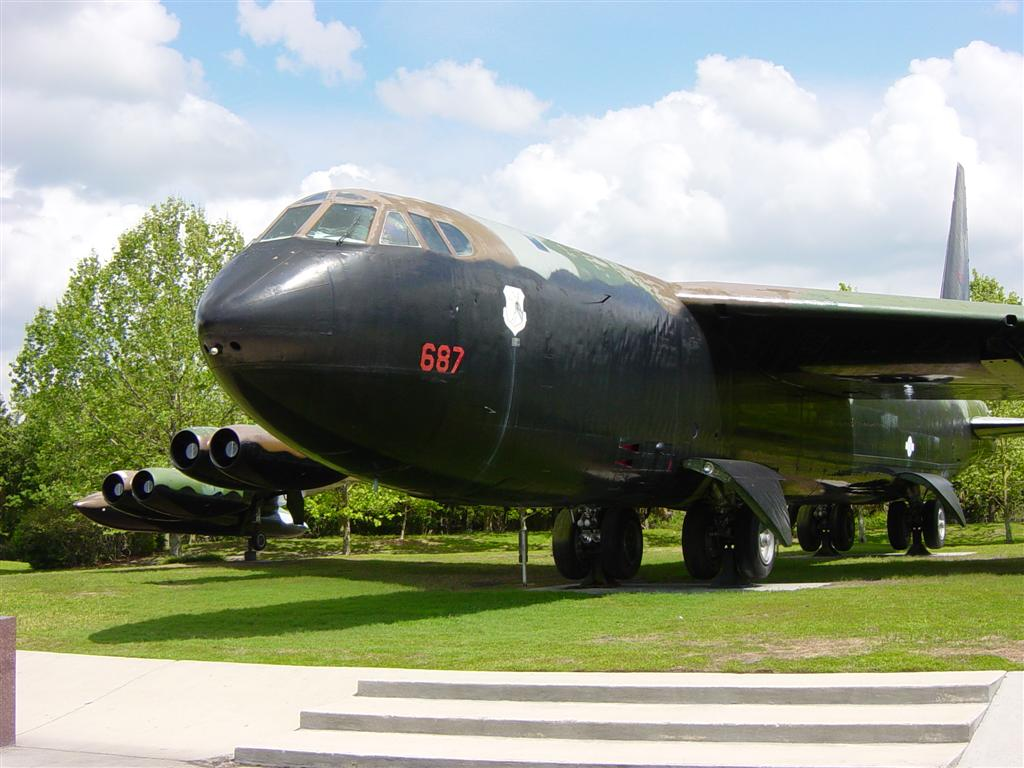
Boeing B-52D-40-BW Stratofortress AF Serial No. 56-0687 on display at the B-52 Memorial Park, Orlando International Airport, Florida. This aircraft was flown to Orlando from Carswell for display at the former McCoy AFB, now Orlando International Airport, when the B-52D was being phased out of the SAC inventory in 1984.

On 13 April 1965, the 7 BW deployed its forces to Andersen Air Force Base, Guam to support SAC combat operations in Southeast Asia. Most of the wing's bombers and tankers, along with aircrews and some support personnel, were deployed. At Andersen AFB, the wing flew more than 1,300 missions over Vietnam and returned to Carswell in December 1965.

B-52 crews were sent through an intensive two-week course on the B-52D, making them eligible for duty in Southeast Asia. B-52s assigned to combat duty in Vietnam were painted in a modified camouflage scheme with the undersides, lower fuselage, and both sides of the vertical fin being painted in a glossy black. The USAF serial number was painted in black on the fin over a horizontal red stripe across the length of the fin.

The B-52 effort was concentrated primarily against suspected Viet Cong targets in South Vietnam, but the Ho Chi Minh Trail and targets in Laos were also hit. During the relief of Khe Sanh, unbroken waves of six aircraft, attacking every three hours, dropped bombs as close as 900 feet (270 m) from friendly lines. Cambodia was increasingly bombed by B-52s from March 1969 onward.

Rotational deployments to Guam, and also to U-Tapao Royal Thai Navy Airfield, Thailand continued on a reduced scale until 1975. In the 1980s the 7th received several new weapons systems, including modified B-52H aircraft. In 1983, B-52 crews began training with a new weapon system, the SRAM (Short Range Attack Missile), and later, in 1985, the ALCM (Air Launched Cruise Missile). Also, the wing flew numerous atmospheric sampling missions during 1986 and 1987 in response to the Chernobyl nuclear reactor accident; four B-52H aircraft (s/n 60-0024, 60-0033, 60-0051, and 60-0052) were modified to carry atmospheric sampling pods code-named "Giant Fish". These aircraft flew the mission into the 1990s from various bases including Carswell. In the area was the longest aircraft building, one mile for F16 plant.

By 1984 Carswell was the largest unit of its kind in the Strategic Air Command. The 7 BW contributed personnel to Operation Desert Storm in the Middle East in 1991. After an overwhelming victory in the Persian Gulf, the wing returned to Carswell. In September 1991 with the end of the Cold War, President Bush ordered a stand-down of all nuclear alert duties.

===== 43d Bombardment Wing =====
In January 1960, the USAF announced its intention to activate the first Convair B-58 Hustler Wing. This was to be the 43d Bombardment Wing, (BW) at that time based at Davis-Monthan AFB, Arizona. The 43rd BW would be moved to Carswell starting on 1 March. The 3958th Operational Test and Evaluation Group (then functioning as an integral unit at Carswell) would be transferred to the 43rd BW upon its arrival. On 1 August 1960, the USAF finally formally assumed B-58 operations responsibility and began testing. 59-2436, the first fully operational Hustler equipped with all tactical systems, was delivered to the 43rd. Two weeks later, the first TB-58A was delivered to Carswell.

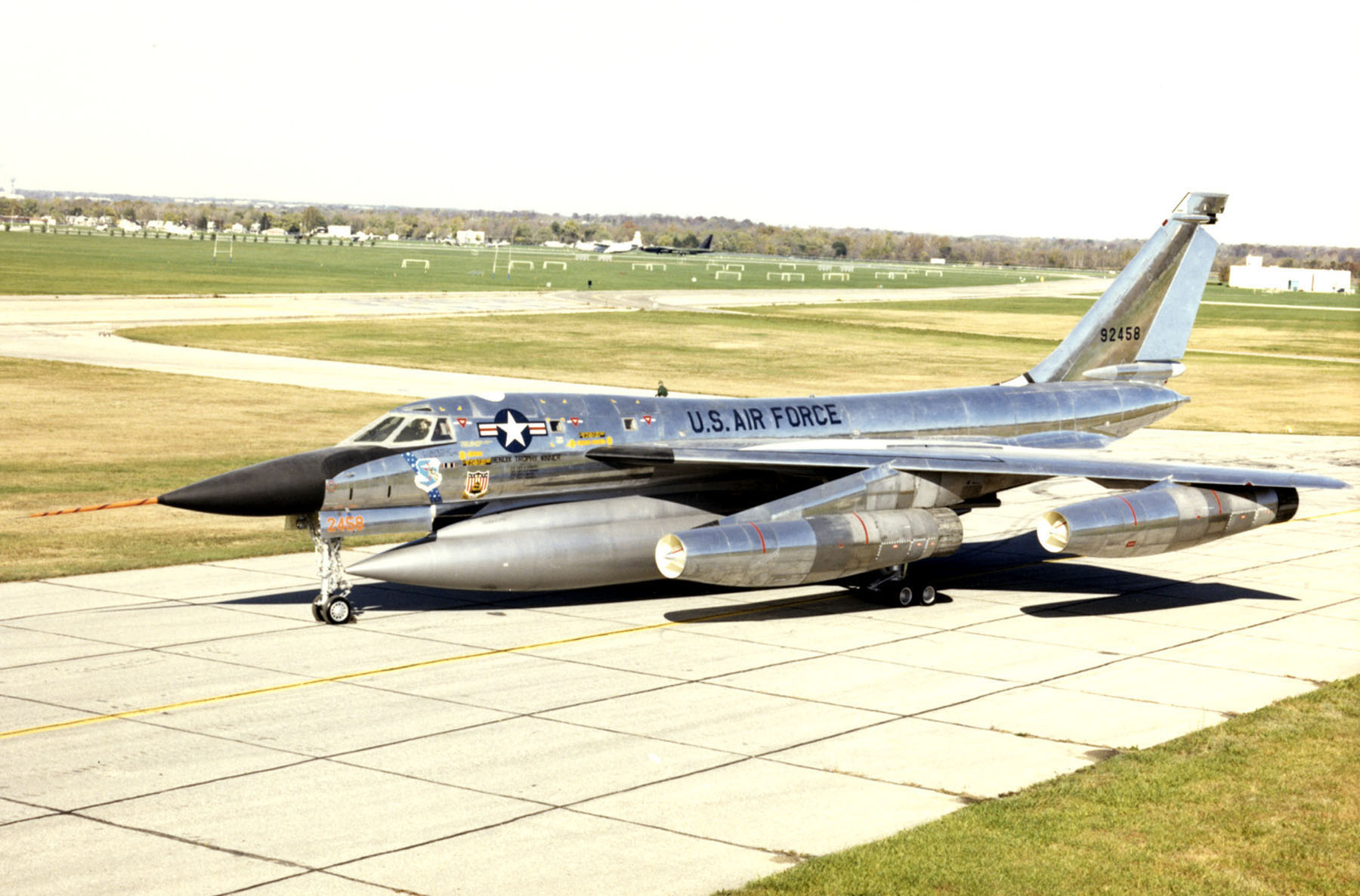
Convair B-58A-10-CF Hustler AF Serial No. 59-2458 of the 43d Bomb Wing. This aircraft set a transcontinental speed record on 3 May 1962 by flying nonstop from Los Angeles to New York and back again. The first leg flown was at an average speed of 1214.71 mph The return leg averaged a speed of 1081.77 mph. The return leg was the first transcontinental flight that moved across the country faster than the rotational speed of the earth. The crew were awarded Bendix and Mackay Trophies, which are now on display at the National Museum of the United States Air Force, Wright-Patterson Air Force Base, Ohio.

After July 1961, the wing continued further B-58 evaluations until June 1962. One of its first duties of the 43d was to operate a school to evaluate the new supersonic jet bomber. On 12 January 1961, Major Henry J. Deutschendorf (the father of singer John Denver) commanded a B-58 crew from the 43rd that set out to break six flight records; five of which the Soviet Union held. The Hustler flew two laps around a course with Edwards AFB, California, at one end and Yuma, Arizona, at the other. The bomber set three speed records over the 1000 kilometer (km) course with a 2000 kilogram (kg), 1000 kg, and 0 kg payload – averaging 1,200.194 miles per hour (mph) in each category. The crew managed an average speed of 1,061.88 mph (1,708.93 km/h) in each of the same payload categories over the 2000 km course. This flight set the pace for the 43rd with the B-58.

From then until the close of 1969 the wing served as one of two SAC B-58 wings with a strategic bombardment mission. One of the last things the wing did while at Carswell AFB took place on 28 March 1964, the day after a major earthquake devastated Alaska. Headquarters USAF tasked the 43rd to provide it with photographs of the region hit by the quake. Members of the 43rd flew two B-58s the 5,751 miles (9,255 km) to Alaska and back, processed the film, and then delivered the pictures to Washington DC 14.5 hours after the wing received the request. Six months later the 43rd Bomb Wing moved to Little Rock AFB, Arkansas.

=== Air Force Reserve ===
In addition to the SAC units, the United States Air Force Reserve 916th Troop Carrier Group, flew Douglas C-124 Globemaster II aircraft from Carswell. It was activated on 1 April 1963. The group supported missions included military airlift to South Vietnam beginning in 1965 and to U.S. forces in the Dominican Republic during a 1965 crisis. It also participated in numerous humanitarian airlift missions. as well as performed tactical airlift missions within the United States.

Beginning in 1972, the 301st Fighter Wing (under various designations) has trained at Carswell as an Air Force Reserve Command unit, training for tactical air missions, including counter-air, interdiction, and close air support. Originally gained by the former Tactical Air Command (TAC), the unit is now operationally gained by Air Combat Command (ACC).

The 301st replaced the Air Force Reserve's 916th Military Airlift Group (916 MAG), which was inactivated. The 301st's 457th Tactical Fighter Squadron flew the F-105 Thunderchief from 1972 to 1982. It transitioned to the F-4 Phantom II in 1981, then to the F-16 Fighting Falcon in 1990. The wing has participated in exercises, both within the United States and abroad. It deployed a Security Police flight to southwest Asia during Operation Desert Storm, January–March 1991, and supported Operation Deny Flight in the Balkans in the mid-1990s. The tail code carried by the present day 457th Fighter Squadron is "TX".

=== Inactivation ===
Carswell AFB was selected for closure under the Defense Base Closure and Realignment Act of 1990 during Round II Base Closure Commission deliberations (BRAC 91). As part of BRAC 91, the decision was made to relocate the 7th Bomb Wing from Carswell AFB to Dyess AFB.

During the 1992 Air Force-wide reorganization, SAC was disestablished on 1 June. Carswell and the 7th Bomb Wing were assigned to the newly created Air Combat Command (ACC), and the B-52Hs assigned to the wing were given the ACC tail code "CW".

First-stage closure activities were initiated in 1992 and B-52H aircraft were relocated to Barksdale AFB, Louisiana by January 1993. The 7 BW was released of all operational capabilities on 1 January 1993 and was transferred to Dyess AFB, Texas without personnel or equipment on 1 October 1993 where it currently flies the B-1 Lancer.

In 1993, Congress directed the establishment of the nation's first joint reserve base under the Base Realignment and Closure authority. Carswell ceased USAF active duty operations on 30 September 1993 and was transferred to the Air Force Base Conversion Agency (AFBCA) for property distribution and reuse.

On 1 October 1993, the Air Force Reserve's 301st Fighter Wing assumed base responsibilities, establishing Carswell as Carswell Air Reserve Station. The Air Force Reserve's Headquarters, 10th Air Force (10 AF), also relocated to Carswell from Bergstrom AFB, Texas as a result of the BRAC action which closed Bergstrom. The USAF ended operational control of Carswell on 30 September 1994 with the transfer of the property to the United States Navy.

=== Previous names ===
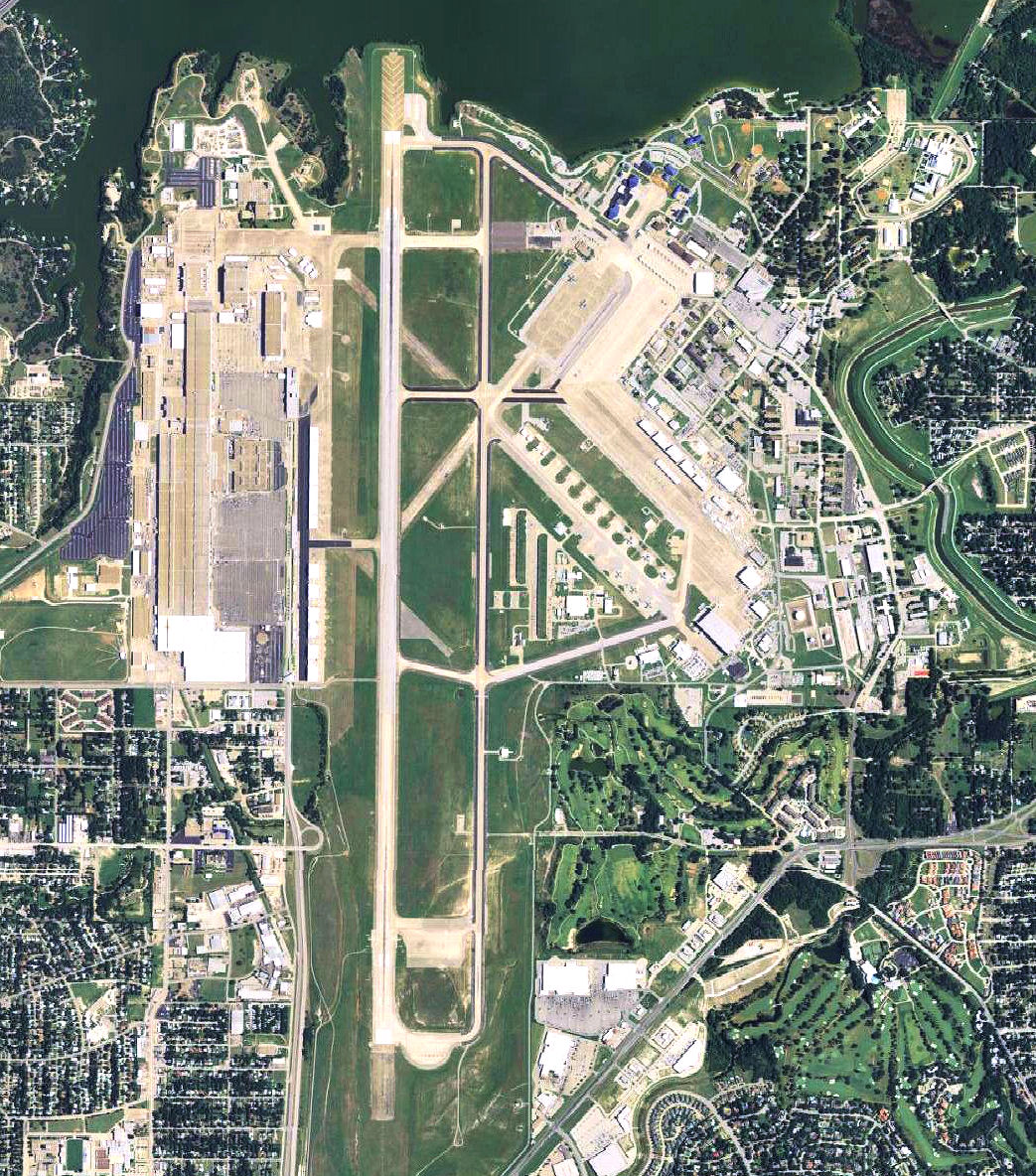
Carswell Field TX 2006

- Army Air Forces Combat Crew School, Tarrant Field (a.k.a. Tarrant Field and Tarrant Field Airdrome), c. 1 July 1942
- Fort Worth Army Airfield, 29 July 1942
- Griffiss Air Force Base, 13 January 1948
- Carswell Air Force Base, 29 January 1948 – 30 September 1994

=== Major commands to which assigned ===
- Second Air Force, c. 26 June 1942
- Army Air Forces Flying Training Command, 30 June 1942
- Second Air Force, 21 November 1944
- Continental Air Forces, 15 April 1945

Re-designated: Strategic Air Command, 21 March 1946

- Air Combat Command, 1 June 1992 – 30 September 1993

=== Major units assigned ===
- 404th Base HQ and Air Base Sq, 18 August 1942 – 1 May 1944
- Army Air Forces Combat Crew School

Re-designated: Army Air Forces Pilot School, Specialized 4-Engine, 28 July 1942 – 1 January 1946

- 96th Pilot Transition Training Group (4 Engine), 28 July 1942 – 1 April 1944
- Army Air Forces Flying Training Command

Re-designated: Army Air Forces Training Command, 21 August 1942 – 24 February 1946

- 2519th AAF Base Unit (Pilot School, Spec 4E), 1 May 1944 – 18 November 1945
- 17th Bombardment Operational Training Wing, 24 December 1945 – 9 April 1946
- 31st Flying Training Wing, 31 May 1945 – 30 December 1945
- 233d AAF (later AF) Base Unit, 18 November 1945 – 17 November 1947
- 7th Bombardment Group, 1 October 1946 – 10 June 1952
- 7th Bombardment Wing, 17 November 1947 – 1 October 1993
- 58th Bombardment Wing, 9 May 1946 – 1 March 1948
- Eighth Air Force, 1 November 1946 – 1 August 1948
- 11th Bombardment Group

Re-designated: 11th Bombardment Wing, 1 December 1948 – 13 December 1957

- 19th Air Division, 16 February 1951 – 16 June 1952; 16 June 1952 – 30 September 1988.
- 4123d Strategic Wing, 10 December 1957 – 25 February 1959
- 43d Bombardment Wing, 15 March 1960 – 1 September 1964
- 916th Troop Carrier Group

Re-designated: 916th Military Airlift Group (AFRES), 1 April 1963 – 8 July 1972

- 512th Troop Carrier Wing

Re-designated: 512th Military Airlift Wing (AFRES): 8 January 1965 – 29 June 1971

- 301st Tactical Fighter Wing (AFRES), 1 July 1972 – 30 September 1994

== Accidents and incidents ==
- March 18, 1989: the main external cargo door of Evergreen International Airlines Flight 17, a McDonnell Douglas DC-9-33F with aircraft registration N931F, opened shortly after takeoff from Carswell on a cargo flight to Tinker Air Force Base. Attempting to return to Carswell for an emergency landing, the airliner crashed in a field in Saginaw, Texas, 8.3 mi (13.4 km) from the runway, killing both pilots. The National Transportation Safety Board (NTSB) attributed the crash to a loss of aircraft control; contributing factors included an electrical design flaw that caused the cockpit warning light to indicate that the door was latched properly when it was not, and the NTSB faulted the Federal Aviation Administration for not having mandated corrective measures after similar incidents involving improperly latched DC-9 cargo doors.

== Popular culture ==
- The base was one of the sites for the filming of James Stewart's 1955 film, Strategic Air Command.
- Air Force One (VC-137C 62-6000) landed at Carswell AFB shortly after 11:00 pm on 21 November 1963 carrying President Kennedy and his entourage to Fort Worth. The next morning, 22 November, President Kennedy returned to Carswell AFB at 11:25 am and boarded Air Force One for a 15-minute flight to Love Field, Dallas, Texas. It was the last use of Air Force One by President Kennedy before he was assassinated later that day in Dallas.

== See also ==
- 34th Flying Training Wing (World War II)
- Liberator village
- Texas World War II Army Airfields

== Bibliography ==
- Manning, Thomas A. (2005), History of Air Education and Training Command, 1942–2002. Office of History and Research, Headquarters, AETC, Randolph AFB, Texas OCLC 71006954, 29991467
- Maurer, Maurer (1983). Air Force Combat Units of World War II. Maxwell AFB, Alabama: Office of Air Force History. ISBN 0-89201-092-4.
- Mueller, Robert (1989). Active Air Force Bases Within the United States of America on 17 September 1982. USAF Reference Series, Maxwell AFB, Alabama: Office of Air Force History. ISBN 0-912799-53-6
- Ravenstein, Charles A. (1984). Air Force Combat Wings Lineage and Honors Histories 1947–1977. Maxwell AFB, Alabama: Office of Air Force History. ISBN 0-912799-12-9.
- Shaw, Frederick J. (2004), Locating Air Force Base Sites, History’s Legacy, Air Force History and Museums Program, United States Air Force, Washington DC. OCLC 57007862, 1050653629
