= Liberator village =

Liberator Village was the government housing area for employees of the Consolidated Aircraft Corporation aircraft manufacturing plant. The village was constructed after April 18, 1942, next to the Army Air Force (AAF) Base Tarrant Field Airdrome, and AAF aircraft plant NO. 4 just west of Fort Worth along the south side of Lake Worth. The Consolidated Vultee Bomber Plant workers would build the B-24 "Liberator" heavy bomber. Later, they would build the B-32 Dominator bomber that made it to the war for only a short time. The plant began production less than a year later while much of its workforce was accommodated in 1,500 prefabricated homes located around the south gate of the plant.

== Background ==
World War II caused a shortage of housing in the area, pushing the U.S. government to build a complex within walking distance of the plant. It would be named Liberator Village after the name of the B-24 bomber.

The employees endured difficult living conditions with the housing described as "ricky-ticky houses and open sewers". However, this is disputed by Lambert. The village was built in three sections. The first section was constructed just across the road from the plant, and was in the shape of a barracks buildings. Sections two and three contained brick buildings and small housing units with asbestos siding. These were locates about a mile away. One building still exists and is used as a newspaper office.

== History ==
The village was operated by the Federal Public Housing Authority, later called the Fort Worth Housing Authority, directed by Lealand Hunter. The tenants called it the Village Housing Authority (VHA). The VHA director was P. F. Miller. The building site was in the White Settlement area just south of the plant. The apartments were constructed in four stages at a cost of three and a half million dollars providing housing near the plant for approximately six thousand people. Many families that moved into these units had never had indoor plumbing, water, or electricity. All bills were paid for only $35.00 to $40.00 rent per month.

Construction of The Village caused problems for the small school district that had only one building with four classrooms. Soon, with government aid, several more buildings were added to the school, but even with the new buildings the students still had to attend class in shifts. A large strip mall was built nearby with a drug, grocery, clothing stores, post office and other small shops.

In May 1949 the Village was inundated by a flood, but largely escaped damage with a small area north of the Village washed out by Farmers Creek. A few trailer houses were damaged, and one boy was killed. The Village became a part of White Settlement in 1954 and finally closed in 1955. It is now a suburb of Fort Worth famous for the longest factory building in the World operated by Lockheed Martin, and its proximity to Naval Air Station Joint Reserve Base Fort Worth.

While the plant would continue to build the even larger B-36 bomber, the Village would fade away during the mid-1950s. The aircraft plant, its workers and the village are commemorated by the White Settlement Historical Museum.

== Sources ==
- Maurice G. Lambert, Memories of Liberator Village, Memorabiliacs Press, 2006
- Robert Harris Talbert, Cowtown-metropolis: Case Study of a City's Growth and Structure, Fort Worth (Tex.), Leo Potishman Foundation, Texas Christian University, 1956
- Bill Yenne, William Yenne, The American Aircraft Factory in World War II, Zenith Imprint, 2006 ISBN 0-7603-2300-3
- Jerry Flemmons, Amon: The Texan who Played Cowboy for America, Texas Tech University Press, 1998
- Oliver Knight, Cissy Stewart Lale, Fort Worth: Outpost on the Trinity, TCU Press, 1990 ISBN 0-87565-077-5
- Harold A. Skaarup, Texas Warbird Survivors 2003: A Handbook on Where to Find Them, iUniverse, 2002 ISBN 0-595-26190-6
