= 42nd Army =

42nd Army may refer to:

- 42nd Group Army, People's Liberation Army, China
- 42nd Army (Soviet Union)

== See also ==
- List of armies by number
- 42nd Division (disambiguation)
- 42nd Brigade (disambiguation)
- 42nd Regiment (disambiguation)
- 42nd Battalion (disambiguation)
- 42nd Squadron (disambiguation)
- 42nd (disambiguation)
