= XXXXII Corps =

XXXXII Corps, XLII Corps, or 42nd Corps may refer to:

- 42nd Army Corps (France)
- XXXXII Army Corps (Wehrmacht)
- 42nd Army Corps (Russian Empire)
- 42nd Rifle Corps, Soviet Union
- 42nd (St Katharine Docks) Middlesex Rifle Volunteer Corps, United Kingdom

== See also ==
- List of military corps by number
- 42nd Army (disambiguation)
- 42nd Battalion (disambiguation)
- 42nd Brigade (disambiguation)
- 42nd Division (disambiguation)
- 42nd Regiment (disambiguation)
- 42nd Squadron (disambiguation)
- 42nd (disambiguation)
