= 42nd Cavalry =

42nd Cavalry may refer to:

- 42nd Cavalry Regiment, British Indian Army
- 23rd Arkansas Infantry Regiment, redesignated the 42nd Arkansas Infantry (Mounted), colloquially the 42nd Arkansas Cavalry
- 42nd Virginia Cavalry Battalion, Confederate States Army

== See also ==
- 42nd Division (disambiguation)
- 42nd Brigade (disambiguation)
- 42nd Regiment (disambiguation)
- 42nd (disambiguation)
