= 42nd =

42nd is the ordinal form of the number 42. 42nd or Forty-second may also refer to:

- A fraction, 1/42, equal to one of 42 equal parts

== Geography ==
- 42nd meridian east, a line of longitude
- 42nd meridian west, a line of longitude
- 42nd parallel north, a circle of latitude
- 42nd parallel south, a circle of latitude
- 42nd Street (disambiguation)

== Military ==
- 42nd Battalion (disambiguation)
- 42nd Brigade (disambiguation)
- 42nd Division (disambiguation)
- 42nd Regiment (disambiguation)
- 42nd Squadron (disambiguation)

== Other ==
- 42nd Amendment
- 42nd century
- 42nd century BC

== See also ==
- 42 (disambiguation)
