= 42 =

42 or The 42 most commonly refers to:

- 42 (number), the natural number following 41 and preceding 43
- One of the years 42 BC, AD 42, 1942, 2042

42 may also refer to:

== Arts, entertainment and media ==
=== Film and television ===
- 42 (film), a 2013 biopic about Jackie Robinson
- "42" (Doctor Who), a 2007 TV episode
- "42", the final episode in 2001 of TV series Buzz Lightyear of Star Command

=== Music ===
- 42, a 2012 album by Cthulhu Rise
- 42 (Sech album), 2021
- "42", a song by Coldplay from the 2008 album Viva la Vida or Death and All His Friends
- "42" (Aya Nakamura song), 2024
- "42", a song by Mumford & Sons from the 2018 album Delta
- "Forty Two", a song by Karma to Burn from the 2010 album Appalachian Incantation, 2010

=== Other uses in arts, entertainment and media ===
- 42 (dominoes), a game
- 42: The Wildly Improbable Ideas of Douglas Adams, 2023 book by Kevin Jon Davies
- The42, an Irish app and sports news website
- The Answer to the Ultimate Question of Life, the Universe, and Everything, from Douglas Adams's series The Hitchhiker's Guide to the Galaxy

== Other uses ==
- 42 (school), a French computer programming school
- The 42 (Kolkata), a residential skyscraper in India
- 42.zip, a zip bomb in computing
- 42, a retired jersey number once worn by Jackie Robinson
- 42, the atomic number of Molybdenum

== See also ==
- 42nd (disambiguation)
- 42 class (disambiguation)
- 42 Entertainment, an alternate reality games company
- 42 Isis, a main-belt asteroid
- 42-volt electrical system
- Tower 42, a skyscraper in London, England
