= 42nd Group =

42nd Group may refer to:

- 42nd Support Group (United Kingdom), a unit of the United Kingdom Army
- Marine Aircraft Group 42, a unit of the United States Marine Corps
- 42d Air Base Wing (42nd Bombardment Group), a unit of the United States Air Force

== See also ==
- 42nd Division (disambiguation)
- 42nd Brigade (disambiguation)
- 42nd Regiment (disambiguation)
- 42nd Battalion (disambiguation)
- 42nd Squadron (disambiguation)
