= S42 =

S42 may refer to:

== Places ==
- Springer Municipal Airport (FAA airport code S42), in Colfax County, New Mexico, United States
- S42, a postcode district in Chesterfield, England, UK

== Science ==
- S42 (selective androgen receptor modulator)
- S-42 (geodetic datum), used in Eastern Europe
- Sulfur-42, an isotope of sulfur

== Technology ==
- IBM NetVista S42, a personal computer
- Lorenz S42, a WW2 German Army cipher machine
- Siemens S42, a mobile phone
- S42: During fumigation/spraying wear suitable respiratory equipment (appropriate wording to be specified by the manufacturer), a safety phrase

== Transportation ==
=== Aerospace ===
- Blériot-SPAD S.42, a French biplane trainer aircraft
- Shorts S.42 Sperrin, a British jet bomber
- Sikorsky S-42, an American flying boat
- Don't Panic (S42), the SpaceX Starship spaceship used on Starship flight 15

=== Busing ===
- S42 (Long Island bus), New York, USA; a bus route
- S42 (New York City bus), New York, USA; a bus route serving Staten Island

=== Rail ===
- S42 (Berlin), a railway line of the Berlin S-Bahn, Germany
- S42 (ZVV), a railway line of the Zurich S-Bahn, Switzerland

=== Submarines ===
- ARA San Juan (S-42), of the Argentine Navy
- Brazilian submarine Tonelero (S42)
- HMS Ursula (S42), of the Royal Navy
- INS Vagli (S42), of the Indian Navy
- USS S-42 (SS-153), a submarine of the United States Navy

== Other uses ==
- Zulu language (Guthrie code S42)

== See also ==
- Lloyd series 42, Austro-Hungarian WW1 reconnaissance aircraft
- 42 (disambiguation)
