= Air Resupply And Communications Service =

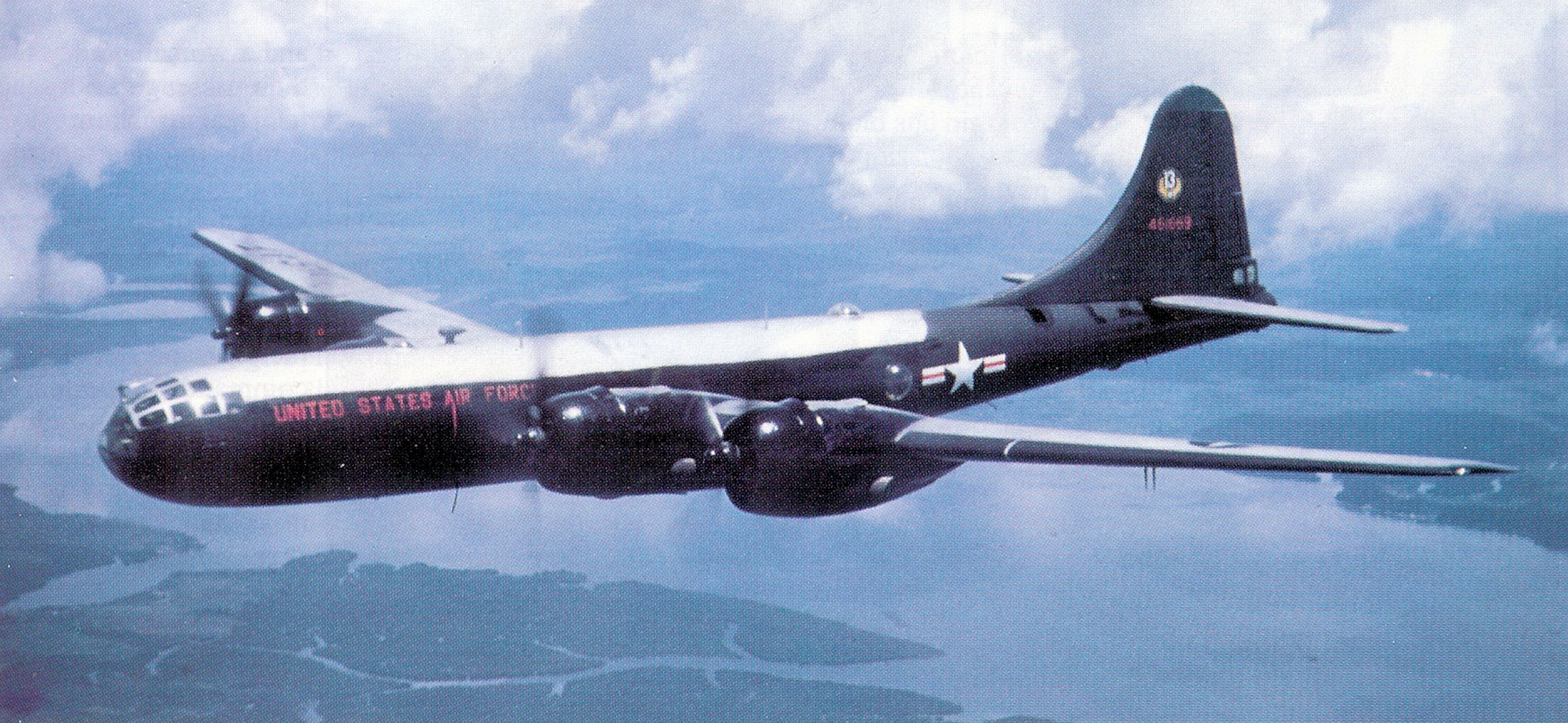
- Boeing B-29A-40-BN Superfortress, 44-61669, assigned to the 581st Air Resupply Group, Kadena AB, Japan, 1953. Note its underside and tail painted black for night operations. A downed crew from one such B-29 was the last group of Americans released by the Chinese communists after the Korean War. This airframe has survived and is now displayed at the March Field Air Museum, California.
- Active: 23 February 1951 – 1 January 1954
- Country: United States
- Role: Special Operations
- Part of: Military Air Transport Service
- Garrison/HQ: Andrews AFB, Maryland

Insignia
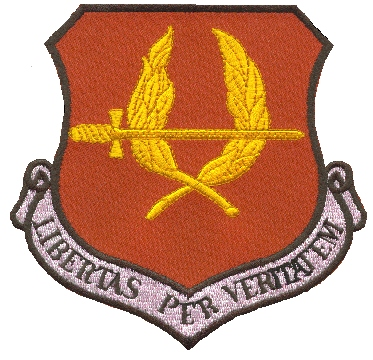
- Air Resupply And Communications Service

The Air Resupply And Communications Service (ARCS) is an inactive United States Air Force organization. It was assigned to Andrews Air Force Base, Maryland. Established during the Korean War, the mission of ARCS was providing the Air Force an unconventional warfare capability during the 1950s. It was inactivated in 1954, but elements continued to operate until the reactivation of air commando units by the Kennedy Administration in 1962.

== Mission ==
The mission of ARCS was:

- Introducing, evacuating and supplying guerrilla-type units in enemy occupied territory.
- Storing and packaging psychological warfare propaganda materials and storing and packing supplies used by guerrilla-type personnel.
- Housing, supplying, administering, training and briefing guerilla-type personnel.
- Composing and reproducing psychological warfare propaganda.
- Composing and transmitting by radio, psychological warfare propaganda.
- Providing and maintaining communications circuits and communications security for the transmission and reception of intelligence material and for the analysis of such intelligence material.
- Perform such other functions as may be assigned.

== History ==
=== Background ===
During World War II unconventional warfare was carried out in every major combat theater by the United States. Clandestine operations, ranging from leaflet dropping to parachuting OSS agents inside enemy-controlled territory, to "Air Commando" units in the China-Burma-India Theater played an essential role in securing victory against Nazi Germany and the Japanese Empire. With the demobilization of the armed forces after the war, most of this capability was lost as the Air Force concentrated on the acquisition of jet aircraft and trying to maintain combat ready forces with austere budgets.

With the outbreak of the Cold War it became apparent to US leadership that the Soviet Union under Joseph Stalin could not be appeased, persuaded, or otherwise convinced to respect the territorial rights of its neighbor nations. The United States Air Force (USAF) and the Central Intelligence Agency (CIA) had been created by the National Security Act of 1947 and activated a short time later.

Strategists in the Pentagon reasoned that the next war would be fought and won (or lost) in the minds of those fighting it. Subsequently, the Psychological Warfare Division was established at the Air Staff in February 1948. By definition psychological warfare in 1948 was synonymous with special operations as defined during World War II. The new Psychological Warfare Division (also known as PW) division immediately set about to develop plans to fight this "new" type of warfare, which came to be known as psychological warfare, or PSYWAR for short.

In 1950 Air Staff/PW created special operations wings devoted to the PSYWAR mission to support United States objectives in the Cold War. All Air Commando-designated units had been inactivated after World War II, however the Korean War underscored the need for a substantial Air Force unconventional warfare capability. Despite the urgency of the war, it took eight months before the Air Resupply and Communications Service (ARCS) was activated by HQ USAF at Andrews AFB, Maryland on 23 February 1951. Assigned to Military Air Transport Service (MATS) the plan called for three flying wings, equipped with a mixture of B-29 Superfortress bombers, twin-engine SA-16 amphibians, C-119 and C-54 transports and H-19 helicopters to be established to perform the psychological warfare and unconventional warfare missions. Although MATS was the official parent command of ARCS, operations were directed from the Pentagon Psychological Warfare Division, Directorate of Plans, HQ, USAF.

MATS established ARCS Wings as follows:

- The 580th and 582d Air Resupply and Communications Wings were established to support operations throughout the Middle East, as well as Western and Soviet-Controlled Europe, and the Soviet Union. Both were activated at Mountain Home AFB, Idaho. The 580th in 1951 and the 582d a year later. After activation and training, both were deployed overseas; the 580th to Wheelus Air Base, Libya, and the 582s to RAF Molesworth, England.
- The 581st Air Resupply and Communications Wing was activated at Mountain Home AFB in July 1951 and deployed to Clark Air Base, Philippines shortly afterwards. Its mission was PSYWAR operations in Korea.

=== Equipment ===
Assigned to an Air Resupply Wing were 12 specially modified B-29 heavy bombers, four C-119 heavy transports, four SA-16 amphibians, and four H-19A helicopters. All aircraft were new, except for the B-29s, which had been pulled from USAF storage at Warner Robins AFB, Georgia. Five other non-flying squadrons were assigned to support the wing's operations by providing maintenance, cargo airdrop rigging, long-range communications, and PSYWAR/leaflet production. One unique squadron was devoted to preparing guerrilla-type personnel for insertion into enemy occupied territory.

Extensive modifications were required for the B-29 Superfortress to enable it to perform the special operations mission. All turrets, except the tail turret, were removed from the aircraft, leaving the aircraft unarmed and incapable of self-defense. A parachutist's exit was made where the belly gun turret was originally located. Resupply bundles were mounted on bomb racks inside the bomb bay, thus allowing the bundles to be dropped like bombs over the drop zone. Aircraft were painted black, and a crude HTR-13 obstruction-warning radar was installed to warn the crew of approaching terrain. The major flaw in the B-29 employed in the special operations role, however, was that it had been designed for high-altitude precision bombing, not low-level airdrop. Over the drop zone at drop airspeed, the aircraft was near its stall speed and was difficult to maneuver.

A B-29 was assigned to the 580th ARCW conducted trials at Eglin AFB, Florida, during the summer of 1951 to determine if the aircraft could be used to extract personnel utilizing the prototype Personnel Pickup Ground Station extraction system. The test aircraft was modified with a 48-inch-diameter (1,200 mm) opening in place of the aft-belly turret and with an elongated tailhook at the rear of the aircraft. The system was similar to the one adopted in 1952 by Fifth Air Force for the C-47s of the Special Air Missions detachment in South Korea. The tests proved technically feasible, but the project was dropped for the B-29 aircraft due to aircraft size and safety considerations of flying it so close to the ground.

=== Korean War ===
==== Detachment 2, 21st Troop Carrier Squadron ====
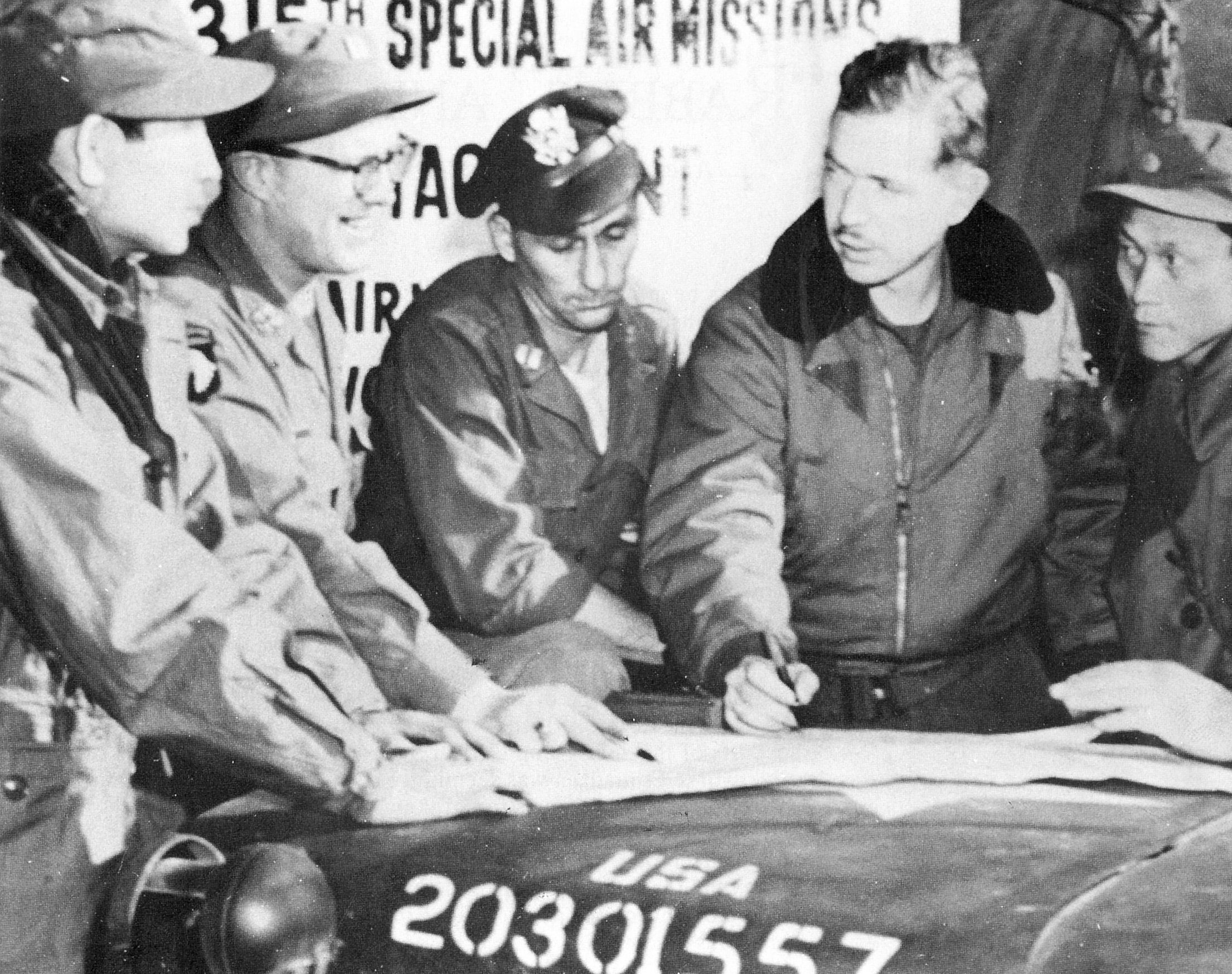
USAF and Army officers coordinating a "Special Air Mission" with their South Korean counterparts during the Korean War, 1951. Major Harry C. Aderholt is second from right, in the fur-collared flight jacket.

Beginning in the fall of 1950, two organizations began conducting "Special Air Missions" in South Korea shortly after the invasion of the South by North Korea. The Far East Air Forces 21st Troop Carrier Squadron, 315th Air Division flew C-47 Skytrain transports, based out of whatever front line airstrip its aircraft found itself at the end of each day. Within the squadron was an innocuously named "Detachment 2", whose mission was to perform unconventional warfare missions. Following the September 1950 breakout from the Pusan Perimeter, the detachment moved north to Seoul's Kimpo Airport (K-14). From there, Detachment 2's aircraft would soon become active far behind enemy lines as far north as Manchuria. Det. 2 supported Far East Command (FECOM) Technical Intelligence, Fifth Air Force, the CIA, and varied United States and South Korean irregular partisan units. Seldom numbering more than half-a-dozen C-47s, Det. 2's pilots coordinated and flew special operations missions for all these individual groups. One of the more hazardous missions carried out by Det. 2. was long-range low-level penetration missions to insert Korean partisans at night behind communist lines.

Flying single-aircraft, 8-hour missions in Korea's mountains, the Detachment became proficient in night operations. To ensure maximum communications and operations security for their missions, FECOM Intelligence gave the code-name "Rabbits" to these highly valued HUMINT agents. They knew that once dropped behind enemy lines, there was only one way back, to walk. Behind the lines, Rabbits used SCR-300 infantry radios to request resupply and to relay intelligence through Det 2 aircraft flying overhead with a long co-axian reception antennae trailing behind the aircraft. It worked, assuming that anti-aircraft fire, weather, or a collision with fog-shrouded mountains had not terminated the mission.

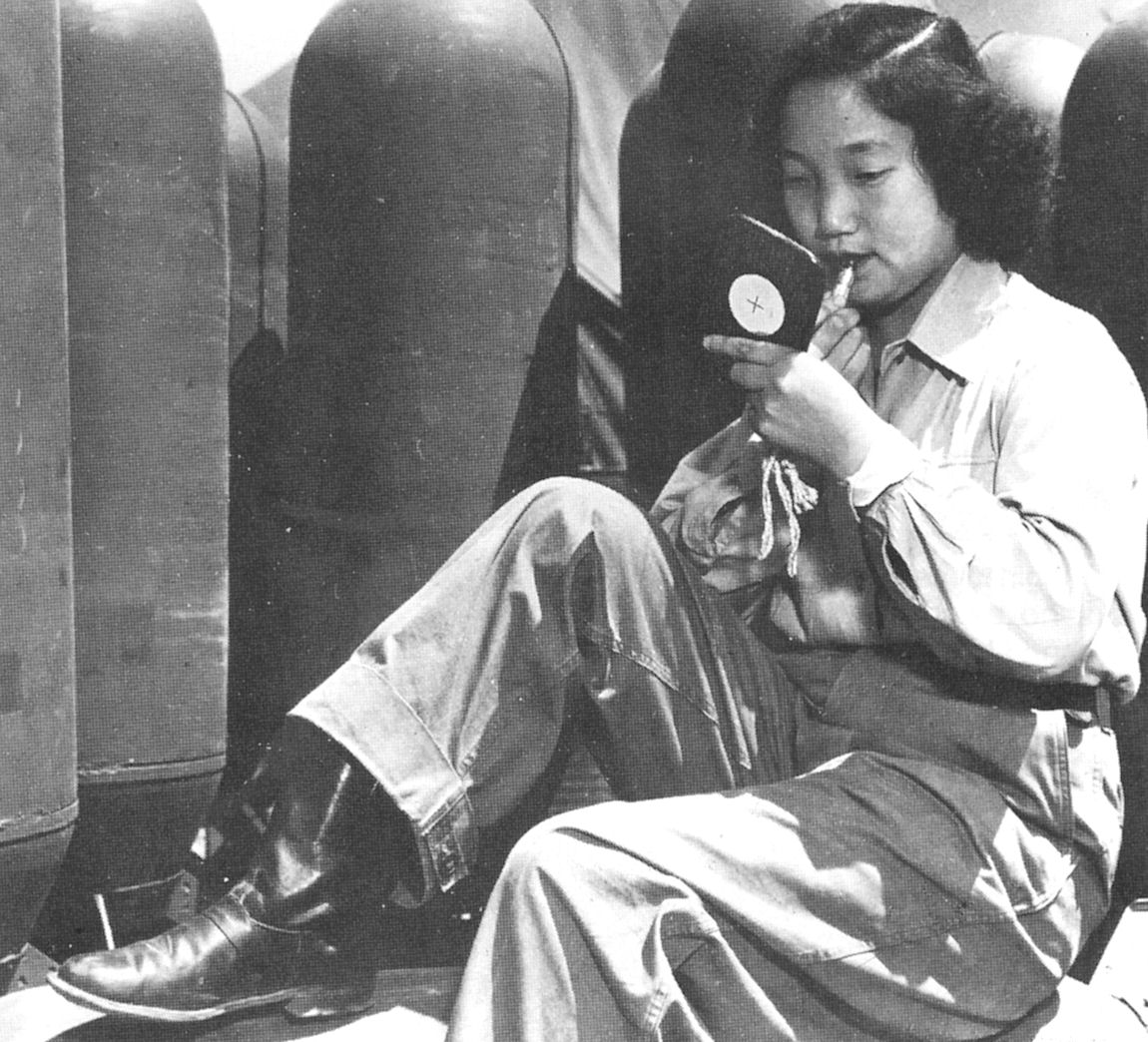
A female South Korean intelligence agent, known as a "Rabbit", preparing to parachute from a C-47 deep inside enemy territory, 1951.

Special female agents were also dropped with orders to attach themselves to the highest Chinese or North Korean officer and travel with him as far as possible toward the front lines. Unarmed, even without radios, their survival was totally dependent on their individual ability to deceive enemy officers they were sent out to approach. These female agents proved remarkably effective. Once near the lines, they would allow themselves to be captured by Allied forces. From detention camps, a pre-arranged signal from them would lead to their release and immediate debriefing of intelligence gathered during their mission. Approximately 1,000 Rabbits were dropped into enemy territory between September 1950 and June 1951. Amazingly, more than 70 percent returned to friendly territory, providing key intelligence into North Korean activities.

Det 2. also developed a C-47 "Bomber". The unit modified some of its aircraft with container racks and bomb shackles and slung two 75-gallon napalm bombs under the transport's belly. Once the Rabbit was dropped by parachute, the "bomber" crews were free to take the war to the enemy. With the aid of moonlight, Det. 2 crews soon became adept at locating truck convoys moving south under cover of darkness to avoid allied airstrikes. By attacking at extremely low altitudes, their accuracy against convoys was phenomenal. From these attacks, it was learned that communist commanders were ordered to avoid detection at all costs, even after being fired upon. Thus the convoy attacks were usually met without any response. Many of these missions were flown by Major (later Brigadier General) Harry C. Aderholt.

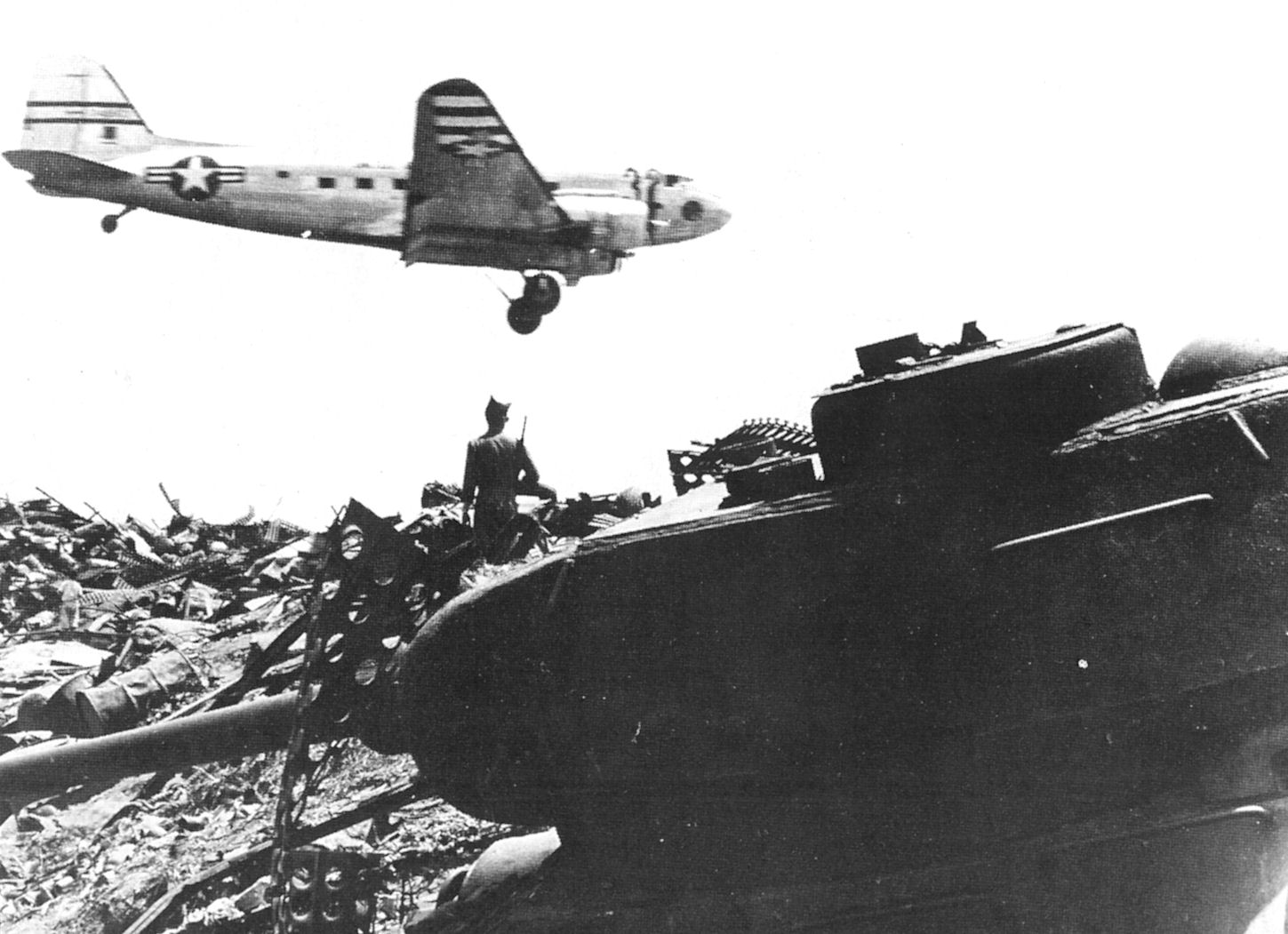
Detachment 2, 21st Troop Carrier Squadron C-47 landing at a rough airstrip in South Korea, 1951.

The November 1950 Communist Chinese intervention into the Korean War was first detected by Det. 2 aircraft, when it saw thousands of troops, trucks, on the ground in Manchuria, on the Chinese side of the Yalu River. This intelligence, however, was not taken seriously and, as history shows, the massive Chinese attack took the UN Command in Korea by surprise. Also, Det 2's "bomber" operations were ordered to be immediately shut down when UN headquarters was made aware of a plan to attack the headquarters of the Soviet Advisory staff in North Korea. As UN forces retreated south during the Chinese attack, contact was lost between the two armies. The order came down from FECOM Intelligence to find the Chinese. In response, Det. 2 parachuted an early warning line of Rabbits at various distances along an east–west axis across the Korean peninsula. Due to various constraints with the SCR-300 radios and the mountainous terrain, the agents were given smoke grenades. At the same time the C-47s were painted with large black and white stripes under the wings for identification purposes. A system was developed that if the Chinese had crossed a point near a Rabbit, red smoke was put out, green if South Korean troops were near the agent, yellow if no one had crossed the areas. Crude, but effective, the system worked.

The unit also employed PSYWAR operations by fitting loudspeakers to its C-47s. The sight of a transport aircraft flying low with impunity was in itself a psychological blow to Chinese Communist and North Korean soldiers, female voices were used for loudspeaker messages announcing that if the troops did not surrender, they would be napalmed. F-51 Mustangs would accompany the C-47s with show-of-force overflights. In one instance, 300 communist troops surrendered along with several trucks of supplies.

In the overall effort, Det. 2's contribution was minor, but it demonstrated the usefulness of Air Commando and special operations.

==== 581st Air Resupply And Communications Wing ====
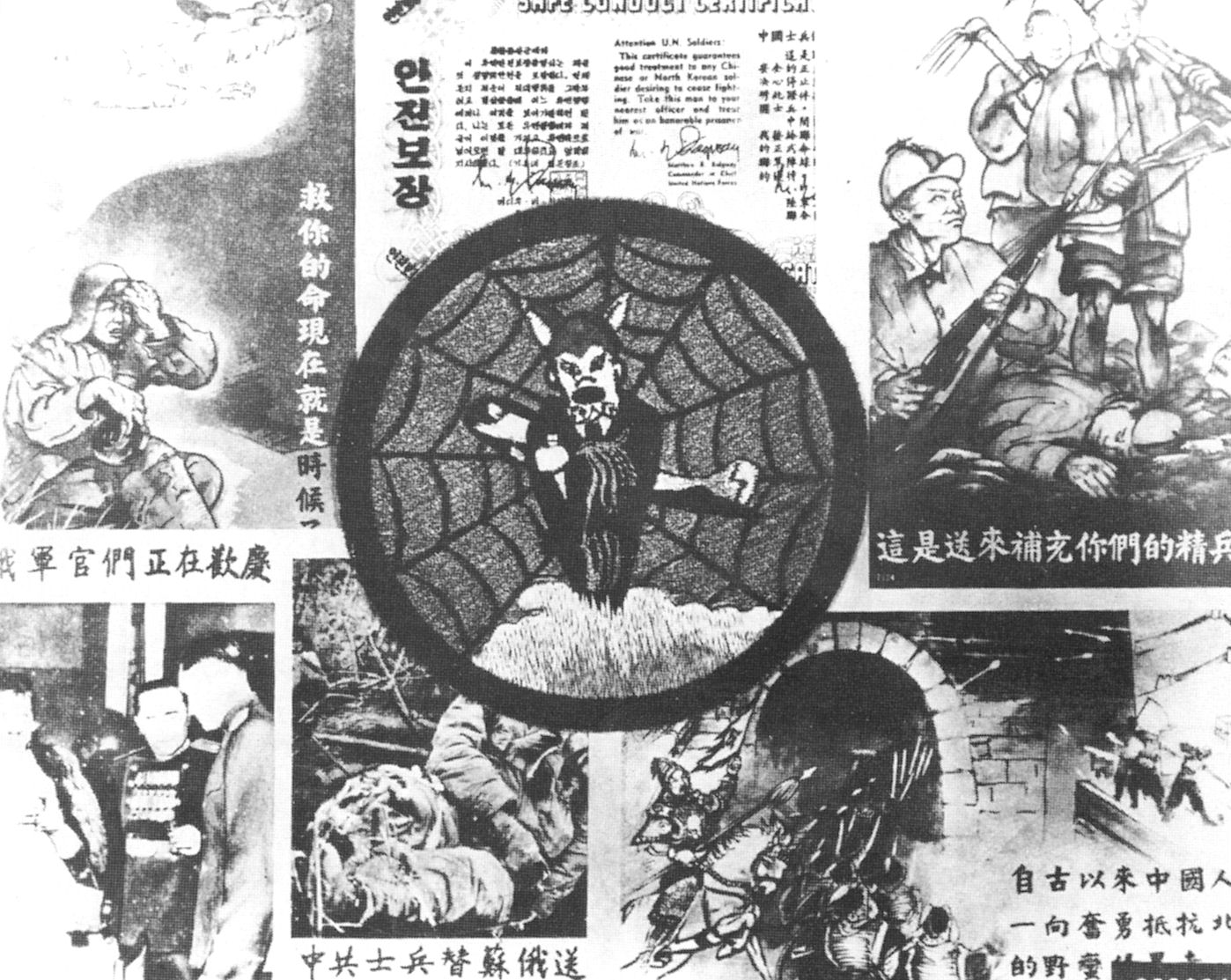
One of the many Propaganda Leaflets dropped by the 581st AR&CW over enemy lines during the Korean War

The 581st saw extensive combat in the Korean War, printing and then dropping millions of surrender leaflets on the enemy in countless PSYWAR operations. It supported the Central Intelligence Agency by performing agent drops and extractions, and resupplying South Korean partisans operating behind enemy lines. Its crews drew upon the lessons of the World War II Eighth Air Force 492d Bombardment Group, the "Carpetbaggers". The Carpetbaggers had performed precisely the same kind of clandestine missions over Nazi-occupied Europe in support of the Office of Strategic Services. Its B-29s were modified for low level agent and special team drops. Except for tail guns, all armament was removed, and its aircraft were painted black underneath.

In January 1953, the 581st lost one of its B-29s and its entire fourteen-man crew while flying a leaflet drop mission over North Korea near the Chinese border. The aircraft had already dropped leaflets over five North Korean towns and was beginning its last run over the village of Cholson. Some of the leaflets carried war news, but others warned of an impending bombing attack by United Nations forces. Suddenly enemy searchlights lit up the sky, and in a rare night attack, a MiG-15 fighter attacked the B-29, setting its right inboard engine on fire. The bomber shook as the tail gunner responded to the attack. Two more MiGs swept by the bomber, this time hitting the number three and four engines with machine gun and cannon fire. With the plane falling from the sky, the crew bailed out. Three of the crew died in the crash, but the remaining crewmen, including the 581st Wing Commander, were captured and sent to a camp in China. They were imprisoned as war criminals engaged in "espionage” by the Chinese. They were held past the June 1953 Korean Armistice and subjected to an international publicized propaganda trial. Later under growing international pressure, the Chinese released the eleven airmen on 3 August 1955, making them the last Korean War American prisoners to be released by the Chinese communists.

As the war wound down in 1953, the 581st responded to an urgent request by the French Government in Indochina for assistance. The wing was tasked to resupply French forces fighting the communist Viet Minh in the First Indochina War. 581st C-119 Flying Boxcars shuttled cargo and troops back and forth continuously between Clark Air Base and French enclaves in Da Nang, Hanoi and Haiphong, Indochina. The 581st also trained civilian C-119 pilots for the Civil Air Transport (CAT), a CIA front company that continued to fly combat missions throughout Indochina until 1954.

==== 581st Air Resupply Squadron Helicopter Flight ====
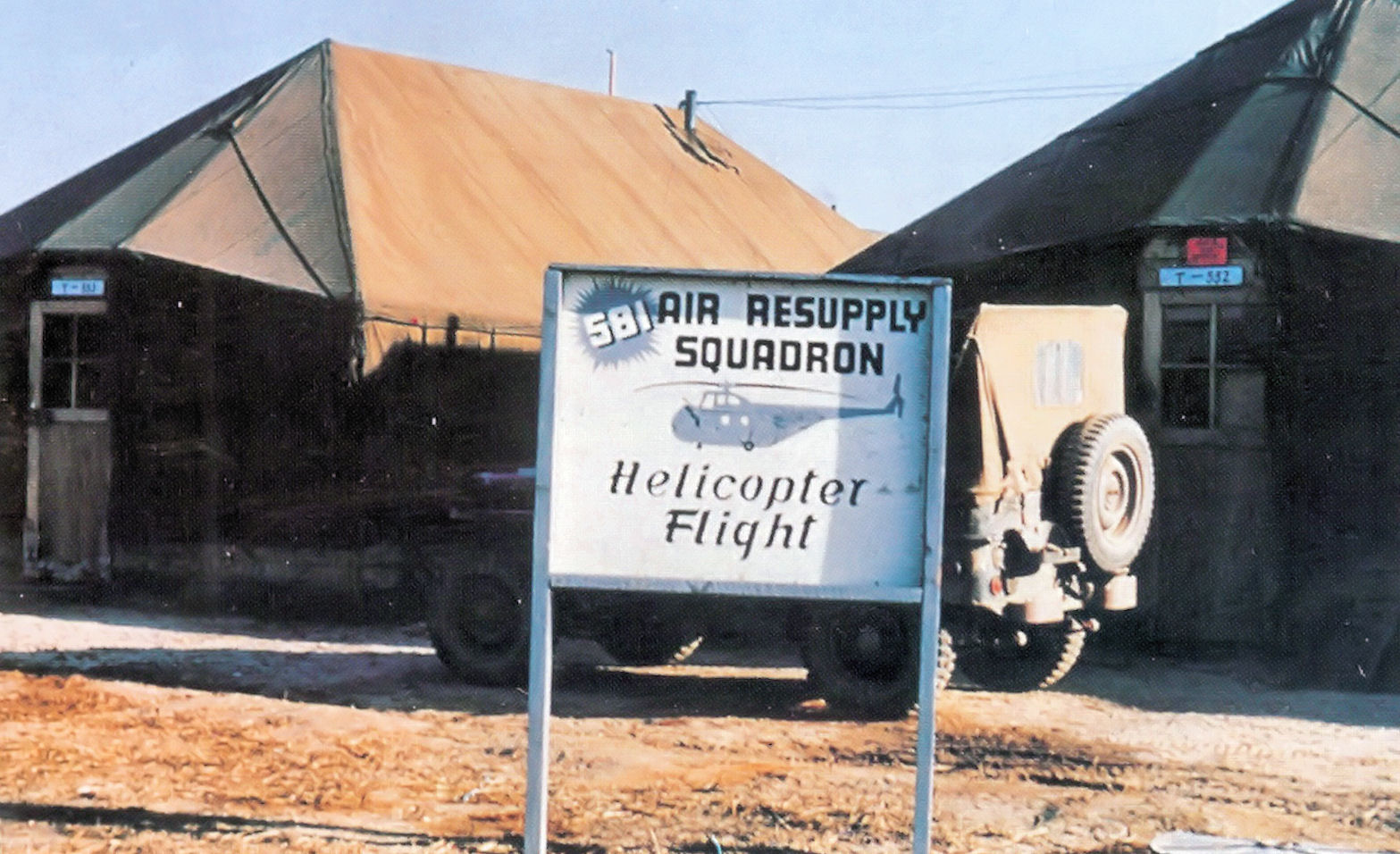
581st Air Resupply Squadron Helicopter Flight Headquarters

Other 581st combat operations in Korea included a special H-19 Chickasaw Helicopter Flight co-located and blended in with elements of the 2157th Air Rescue Squadron at Kimpo Airport (K-14). In one six-month period of operations, the H-19s logged over 1,100 hours of combat flying in over 300 intelligence and rescue missions. Parked alongside the ARS H-19 helicopters the "Rescue" markings had been painted over with the words "Air Resupply". However, these helicopters had a very different mission than air rescue. The 581st Air Resupply Squadron Helicopter Flight didn't get their operations orders from the 581st Wing, or even from Fifth Air Force. The Air Commandos of the 581st Helicopter Flight received their missions from U.S. Far East Command's "Liaison Detachment", a battle group of the United Nations "Combined Command for Reconnaissance Activities, Korea".

The helicopter Flight flew blacked-out, single-ship night low-level insertions of United Nations agents and sabotage teams behind North Korean lines. On occasion, the helicopters would augment the 2157th Air Rescue Squadron as a secondary mission. Virtually all night insertion missions began with one of the Flight's helicopters departing at night from Cho-do Island (K-54) a bleak rock located ten miles from the Korean coast, sixty miles north of the 38th Parallel. The island's proximity to the peninsula's coastline and mudflats provided an ideal base to conduct night special operations missions. The Flight would proceed from K-14 to Cho-do and pick up the agents. After a final briefing, the H-19s flew out over the sea at wave-top level to avoid North Korean radars.

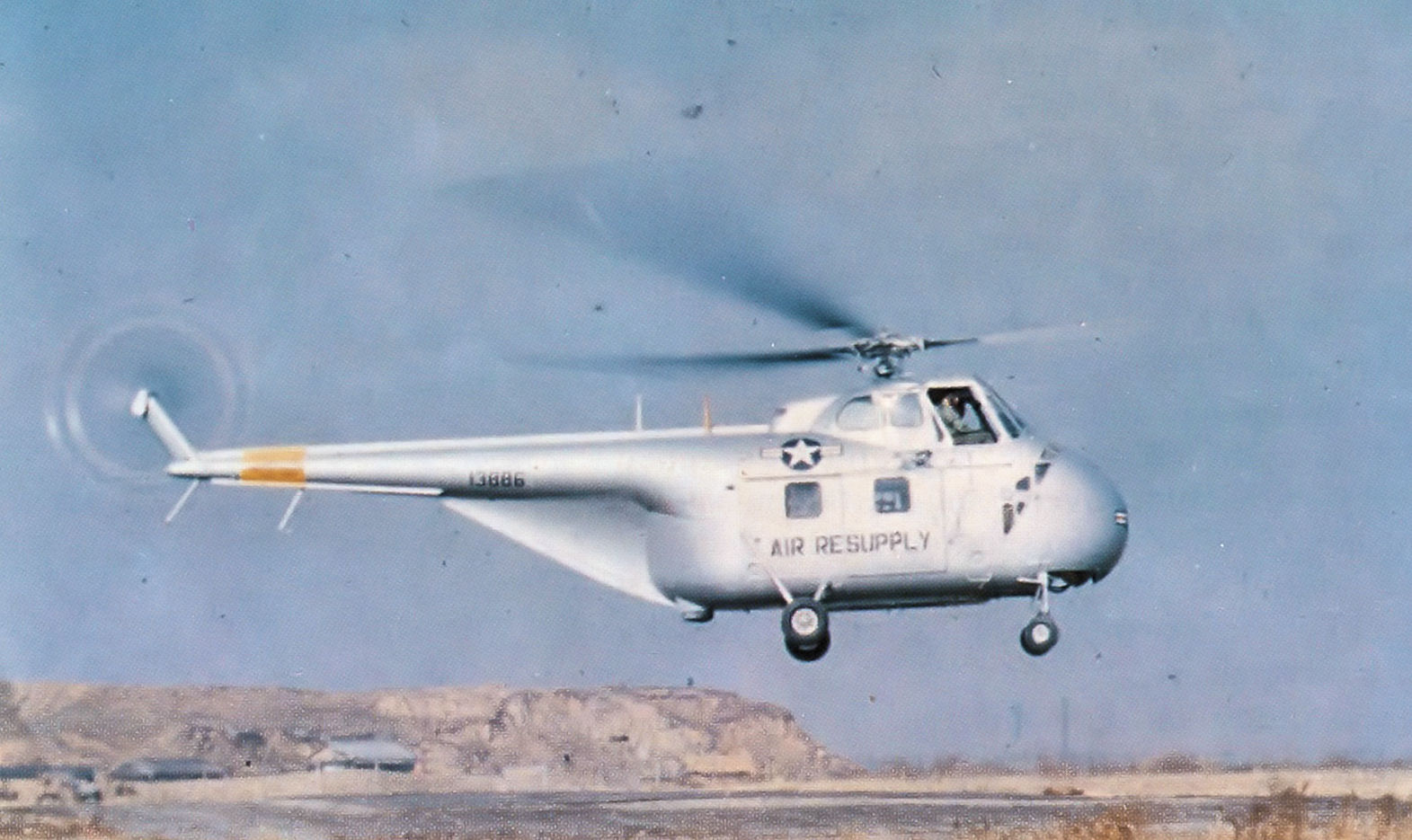
A 581st H-19 helicopter

As the Air Rescue service did not fly night rescue missions, the North Koreans soon learned that the sound of a helicopter at night meant only one thing: an agent insertion or extraction mission was in progress. To lower the sound of the helicopters, the aircrews of the H-19s kept the engine exhaust stack on the left side of the helicopter away from the coastline as much as possible. The crews could only hope that North Koreans weren't waiting in ambush for them. As dangerous as these missions were, the Air Commandos at least had the element of surprise and the safety of darkness on their side.

Two Air Commando H-19 pilots received the Silver Star and Distinguished Flying Crosses from an attempted rescue mission described in their citations as "the deepest helicopter penetration of the Korean War". Taking off from Cho-do Island in the early morning hours, Captain Frank J. Westerman and Lieutenant Robert Sullivan flew low-level through darkness for two hours, guided north by an Air Rescue SA-16 pathfinder aircraft flying overhead at an altitude of 100 feet. At first light, the helicopter was 16 miles south of the Chinese border and within ten minutes flying time of the Chinese MiG fighter base at Antung, the largest Chinese fighter base in North Korea. Racing inland they discovered the valley the downed pilot was reported to be in, which turned out to be a massive camouflage supply and troop depot. The valley contained at least a regiment of troops, all armed and firing as fast as they could. The hills looked like a large warehouse, piles of equipment and supplies under camouflage nets. It was quickly evident that no evading American was walking around in the area. The Air Commandos fled for their lives, informing the SA-16 offshore to do the same. It was likely that the rescue attempt was bait for a Chinese trap. All of the Air Commandos returned to Cho-do successfully.

=== Cold War ===
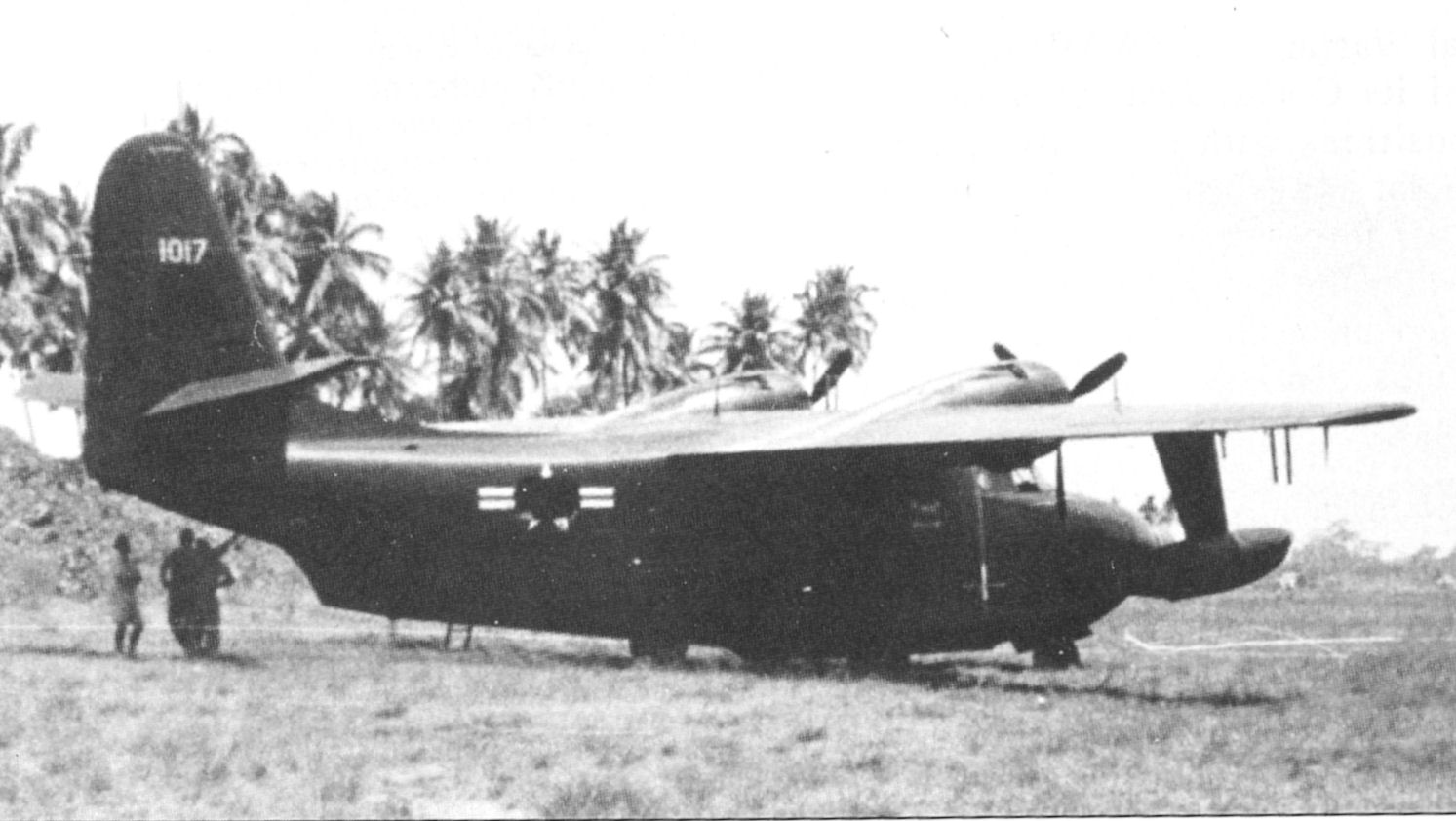
ARCS Grumman SA-16A Albatross 51-017m in the Philippines

From its base in Libya, the 580th AR&CW operated in Southern and Southeastern Europe as well as the Middle East, frequently working with United States Army Special Forces in the Alps. The 580th also had extensive ground-based printing facilities to produce propaganda leaflets to be dropped from its B-29s.

Between 1953 and 1956, the 580th's SA-16 Flight supported CIA Lockheed U-2 overflights of Eastern Europe. On two different occasions, SA-16 crews recovered U-2 pilots after their all-black, single engine spy jets crashed, one in the Caspian Sea north of Iran and the second in the Black Sea. The SA-16 Flight was also particularly suited to support Special Forces teams. This mission required an SA-16 to fly across the Mediterranean at night from Wheelus AB and land on a lake in West Germany at dawn, pick up a team from the 10th Special Forces Group and transport them to RAF Molesworth, England. The SA-16 crew was briefed that their "customers" would be in a boat on the lake, disguised as fishermen. As dawn broke over the lake, the plane settled down on the water promptly on schedule and taxied over to the only boat on the lake.

Loading their passengers aboard quickly, the crew took off for England, surprised to find that the three passengers consisted of two men and a woman. The crew remarked among themselves that they were surprised to learn that Army special forces now included women. The plane landed at Molesworth without incident. Only there did they learn that the crew had picked up three West German citizens who were out on a morning fishing trip. After apologies were made, the crew flew the civilians back to West Germany, and the passengers thanked the airmen for the surprise trip.

==== Inactivation ====
By 1953 USAF interest in the unconventional warfare mission had run its course. The primary reason for this reduction was funding. The Air Force was essentially operating a national-level special operations program for an agency outside the Department of Defense—the CIA—with dollars needed for higher priority strategic forces. With the rapid buildup of the Strategic Air Command to counter Soviet Cold War aggression and the resulting funding requirements, the lesser priority PSYWAR mission was curtailed.

All three AR&CW were downgraded to Group status in 1953, but continued to perform classified missions until their final inactivation in 1956. The downsized groups were approximately one-half the size of the former wings and consisted of two squadrons—one flying squadron and one support squadron, as compared to six squadrons in each wing before the reorganization. In April 1953 the Air Staff directed ARCS to limit operations to Air Force only projects, thus ending support for such outside agencies as the CIA. Nine months later Department of the Air Force Letter 322 and Military Air Transport Service General Order 174 inactivated ARCS, effective 1 January 1954.

General Order 37, Headquarters Seventeenth Air Force, dated 12 October 1956, inactivated the 580th ARG in place in Libya. Third Air Force General Order 86, dated 18 October 1956, inactivated the 582d ARS, effective 25 October 1956. With the inactivation of the 581st at Kadena AB in September 1956, the USAF closed the book on the long-range unconventional warfare mission around which the ARCS and its associated wings were based.

Their missions were continued, on a smaller scale, by USAF successors under a variety of different designations. At Molesworth, the 42d Troop Carrier Squadron (Special) absorbed the C-119s, SA-16s, and the remaining personnel of both the 580th and 582d Air Resupply and Communications Groups. The 42d also maintained at detachment at Wheelus. In 1957, the 42d traded in its C-119s for the more powerful, longer range C-54 Skymaster and moved from Molesworth to nearby RAF Alconbury when Molesworth was put into a standby status. By the end of the year, the 42d was inactivated and with it the Air Commando mission in Europe.

In the Pacific, the 581st ACWG was taken over by the 322d Troop Carrier Squadron (Medium, Special) flying C-54s until its inactivation in 1958. Cold War tensions, however, remained strong during the 1950s even after the 1953 Korean Armistices.

==== Air National Guard ====
The Air National Guard's introduction to the world of special operations began when MATS began phasing out its Air Resupply units. Despite the decision, there was still a need to maintain a limited number of crews and aircraft to support unconventional warfare missions. After lengthy deliberations, the Air Force decided in 1955 to establish four special air warfare units within the Air National Guard:

- California Air National Guard 129th Air Resupply Group
- West Virginia Air National Guard 130th Air Resupply Squadron
- Rhode Island Air National Guard 143d Air Resupply Squadron
- Maryland Air National Guard 135th Air Resupply Group

Equipped with hand-me-down equipment from the inactivated ARCS (minus the B-29s), these Air National Guard units trained in Air Commando tactics. During the early 1960s, these units were re-designated first as Air Commando units, then as Special Operations in 1968. After the end of the Vietnam War in 1975, these units were converted to other missions.

==== Tibet ====
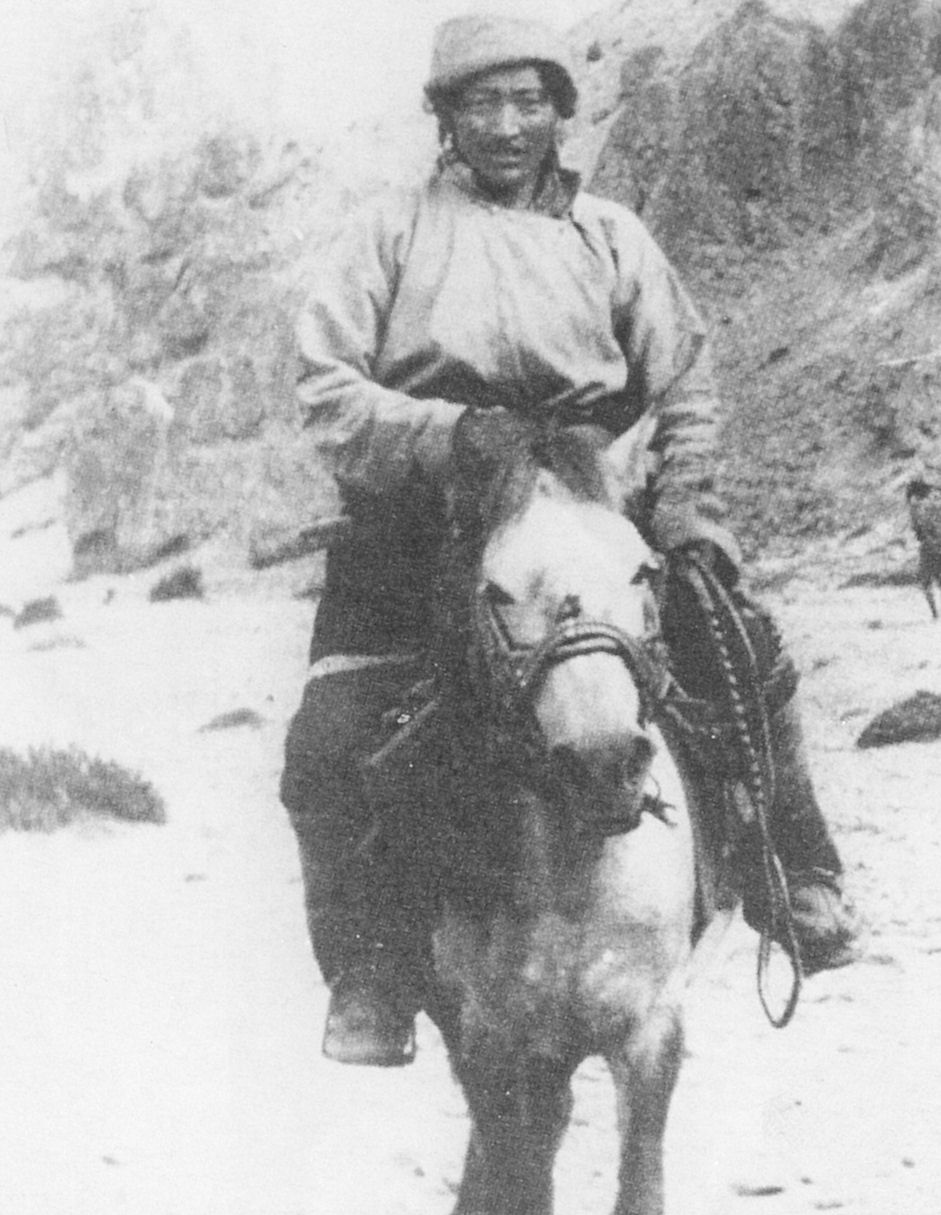
Tibetan Rebel on horseback

After Mao Tse-tung's communist victory in 1949 over Chiang Kai-shek's Nationalists in China, Mao turned his army west into Tibet during 1950. Tibet's independent tribes rebelled, becoming "bandits" to the Chinese communists. In the years after the Korean War, the Chinese were still fighting against a Tibetan guerrilla army (Tibetan rebels, in fact were active until the late 1980s). The communists had one indispensable advantage, as the rugged geography of Tibet made outside support from the west to the Tibetan guerrilla almost impossible. President Dwight D. Eisenhower wanted to send aid, however the United States lacked the expertise and equipment to conduct the long-range air commando clandestine logistics mission it needed just to get to Tibet.

The needed airlift capability was forthcoming from a select group of USAF officers selected for service outside of official Air Force channels. Detachment 2, 1045th Observation, Evaluation and Training Group (OE&TG) was established at Kadena AB, Okinawa in 1955. Det. 2's mission was to conduct high-altitude, high-risk, clandestine logistics support flights to Tibet. It utilized a single C-118 Liftmaster marked as Civil Air Transport (CAT), a CIA aircraft owned by the United States Government. By 1959, the plane completed more than 200 overflights from its base at Saigon, South Vietnam to Tibet. However, the extremely high altitudes the plane operated at just to get to Tibet precluded effective support, as weight and fuel limitations meant that the plane had to fly with a diminished cargo capacity. The loss of only one of the aircraft's four engines over Tibet's rugged mountains would make the loss of the aircraft and American crew inevitable, taking with it any hope of maintaining "Plausible deniability" of United States support to the rebels. The new Lockheed C-130A Hercules was the obvious choice for the operation, however the only C-130s available in the Pacific were assigned to the USAF 315th Air Division, 21st Troop Carrier Squadron. Secretary of Defense Thomas S. Gates Jr. approved the establishment of "E Flight", 21st Troop Carrier Squadron, which was activated in March, 1959 at Naha Air Base, Okinawa.

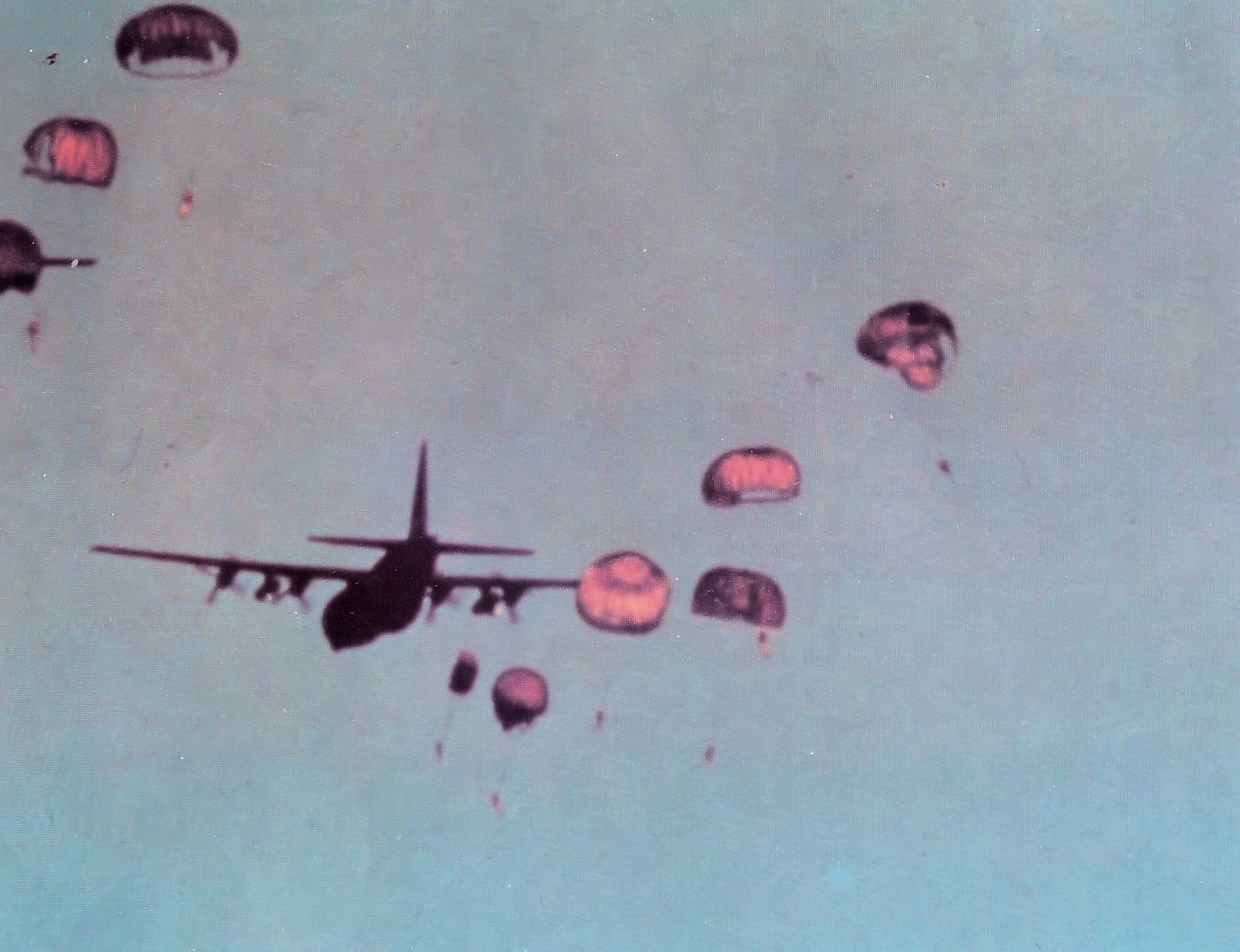
Clandestine C-130A supply drop over Tibet

E Flight C-130s were flown from their home base at Naha to Kadena for removal of USAF markings and manning by CAT personnel then to Takhli Airfield, Thailand for flying over the Himalayas to Tibet. To reduce their chance of Chinese detection, the CAT aircrews flew their C-130s to Northern Thailand through inadequately chartered mountainous terrain with no navaids except the navigator's celestial plotting skills. All missions to Tibet were also flown at night during ten-day "moon windows" which allowed at least some visual terrain recognition. Also flights were limited to the dry Monsoon season to eliminate the chance of becoming lost in the clouds. A routine mission would carry a number of cargo pallets rigged for parachute dropping along with personnel consisting of a US adviser and Tibetan Guerrillas trained by the United States which would parachute out along with the cargo. The Guerrillas were trained secretly at "Camp Hale", a secluded site located above 10,000 feet elevation near Leadville, Colorado and then flown out from Peterson AFB to Asia.

However, these missions taxed even the extreme range capability of the C-130. Shifting winds or mechanical problems frequently caused mission deviations, and a discreet relationship was had with the Government of Pakistan to allow C-130s to land in East Pakistan if necessary. When Tibet's leader, the Dalai Lama, fled Tibet, it was these Tibetan Guerrillas and US Advisers who aided his escape to India.

With the downing of Gary Power's U-2 over the Soviet Union in May 1960, the Eisenhower Administration ordered all air commando missions into Tibet ended immediately, and mission was ended. Shortly afterwards, America's attention was being drawn towards another growing conflict in Southeast Asia, which would establish the Air Commandos on a permanent basis.

==== Operation Pluto (Alabama ANG) ====
see also: Bay of Pigs Invasion

In 1960, the Alabama Air National Guard consisted of two RF-84F Thunderflash tactical reconnaissance squadrons that primarily flew air photography missions in support of the needs of the state. Flooding, hurricane damage and forest fire mapping were its primary objectives. It was from these men that a secret training team was set up by an experienced Air Force special warfare officer attached to the CIA to assist in the training, equipping and organizing a Cuban exile force. The Cubans executed "Operation Pluto", an amphibious paratroop invasion of Cuba at Bahia de Conchinos, in English, the Bay of Pigs.

The Eisenhower Administration wanted to see regime change in Cuba after its communist revolution in 1959. In the summer of 1960, the CIA obtained fifteen World War II B-26 Invader medium bombers from storage at Davis-Monthan AFB, Arizona and had them refurbished. To fly these aircraft, Cuban exile pilots needed to be trained in their operations. Searching for B-26 instructors and maintenance personnel, the CIA became aware of an organization that had exactly the people it needed: The Alabama Air National Guard. Specifically, the 106th Tactical Reconnaissance Squadron at Birmingham was the last Air National Guard organization to fly the B-26, having retired its old bombers just three years earlier in 1957. Working discreetly through the Alabama Adjutant General's office, the Air Commando Major attached to the CIA (who was born and raised in Alabama) made arrangements for some Alabama ANG pilots and maintenance crews to train the Cubans in the B-26. In less than two months, eighty American instructors were transported to a secret CIA air base at Puerto Cabezas Airport, Nicaragua, to begin training the Cuban exiles. Both B-26 ground attack missions along with C-46 paratrooper training for the exile's airborne forces were emphasized. The Alabama ANG instructor pilots were told prior to volunteering that their primary mission was to train Cuban exile aircrews; they were not going to fly in combat unless it was a last resort.

The plan was that a pre-invasion air strikes would destroy Fidel Castro's small fighter force, especially its three T-33 Shooting Star jets that the Cuban Air Force possessed that were armed with M-3 machine guns. On 15 April 1961, at about 06:00 Cuba local time, eight B-26 bombers in three groups simultaneously attacked three Cuban airfields at San Antonio de los Baños and at Ciudad Libertad (formerly named Campo Columbia), both near Havana, plus the Antonio Maceo International Airport at Santiago de Cuba. At San Antonio, the three attackers destroyed three Cuban B-26s, one Sea Fury and one T-33. At Ciudad Libertad, the three attackers destroyed only non-operational aircraft with the loss of one B-26, and a companion B-26 was damaged, and flew north to the Florida Keys. Late on 16 April, President Kennedy ordered cancellation of further airfield strikes planned for dawn on 17 April, to attempt plausible deniability of US direct involvement.

On D-Day, 17 April, four of the B-26s were shot down in combat. With the loss of the Cuban-flown B-26, the CIA reluctantly authorized American volunteers to fly combat missions over the beachhead on D+2, 19 April. Five B-26 sorties were scheduled, four of them with American crews. Known as the Mad Dog Flight', Castro's T-33 jets and propeller-driven Hawker Sea Fury fighters were waiting as the Alabama ANG pilots attempted to drive home attacks against the advancing Cuban Army ground forces. In the day-long combat that ensued, four Alabama ANG aircrew in two B-26s were shot down and killed. US Navy fighter pilots flying over the beachhead from the USS Essex (CV-9) watched the Cuban fighters attacking the B-26s, but were ordered not to interfere. The invasion collapsed the following day.

=== From the 1960s ===
At the same time of the Bay of Pigs invasion by the CIA, at the direction of President John F. Kennedy, Air Force General Curtis Lemay directed HQ Tactical Air Command in April 1961 to organize and equip a unit to train USAF personnel in World War II–type aircraft and equipment; ready surplus World War II-era aircraft for transfer, as required, to friendly governments provide to foreign air force personnel in the operation and maintenance of these planes; and to develop/improve: weapons, tactics, and techniques. In response to Lemay's directive, on 14 April 1961 Tactical Air Command activated the 4400th Combat Crew Training Squadron (CCTS) at Eglin AFB Auxiliary Field #9, Florida. The provisional unit had a designated strength of 124 officers and 228 enlisted men.

In the early 1960s, the United States entered the Vietnam War, and active-duty Air Commando units were formed. It was renamed Special Operations Wings in 1968.

- 1st Air Commando Wing, 27 April 1962, Eglin AFB Auxiliary Field #9, Florida
- 315th Air Commando Wing, 21 February 1966, Tan Son Nhut Air Base, South Vietnam
- 14th Air Commando Wing, 28 February 1966, Nha Trang AB, South Vietnam
- 56th Air Commando Wing, 16 March 1967, Nakhon Phanom RTAFB, Thailand
- 24th Air Commando Wing, 15 March 1968, Howard Air Force Base, Canal Zone

In 1990, the Air Force formed the Air Force Special Operations Command, elevating Air Force special operations to the Major Command level.

== Units/bases ==
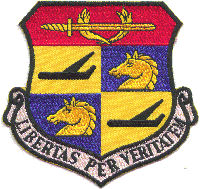
580th Air Resupply Wing (Group)

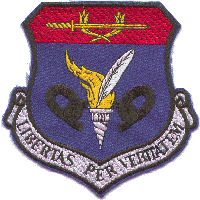
581st Air Resupply Wing (Group)

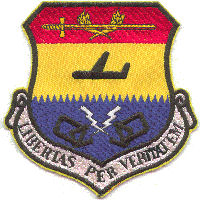
582d Air Resupply Wing (Group)

- Headquarters, Air Resupply and Communications Service

Andrews AFB, Maryland

- 580th Air Resupply and Communications Wing
  Mountain Home AFB, Idaho, 16 Apr 1951 – 17 Sep 1952
  Wheelus Air Base, Libya, 22 September 1952 – 8 September 1953

580th Air Resupply Group
Wheelus Air Base, Libya, 8 September 1953 – 12 October 1956

- 581st Air Resupply and Communications Wing
  Mountain Home AFB, Idaho, 23 Jul 1951 – 18 Jul 1952
  Clark Air Base, Philippines, 18 July 1952 – 8 September 1953

581st Air Resupply Group
Kadena Air Base, Okinawa, 8 September 1953 – 1 September 1956

- 582nd Air Resupply and Communications Wing
  Mountain Home AFB, Idaho, 24 September 1952 – 1 May 1953
  Great Falls AFB, Montana, 1 May – 14 August 1953

582nd Air Resupply Group
RAF Molesworth, England, 21 Funerary 1954 – 25 October 1956

- 1300th Air Base Wing (Training)

Mountain Home AFB, Idaho, 1 November 1951-30 April 1953

== Aircraft ==
- C-119 Flying Boxcar (1950–1953)
- B-29 Superfortress (1951–1953)
- SA-16 Albatross (1951–1953)
- Sikorsky H-19 (1952–1953)
- C-54 Skymaster (1952)
- C-118 Liftmaster (1952–1953)

== See also ==
- 6007th Reconnaissance Group
