= Garner Independent School District =

School district in Texas

Coordinates: 32.8332°N 97.9851°W

Address
- 2222 Garner School Rd Region 11 Weatherford, Parker County, Texas, 76088; USA

District information
- Type: Public, Independent school district
- Motto: Where the best begins
- Grades: Pre-K through 8
- Superintendent: Rebecca Hallmark
- Governing agency: Texas Education Agency
- Budget: $2.2 million (2015-2016)
- NCES District ID: 4820370

Students and staff
- Students: 196 (2017-2018)
- Teachers: 15.32 (2017-2018)
- Staff: 30.76 (2017-2018)

Other information
- Website: www.garnerisd.net

Garner Independent School District is a public school district based in the community of Garner, Texas (USA). Until the year 2021, Garner was the only school district in Parker County that taught prekindergarten through 8th grade, and students went to other districts to complete high school. The district had one school – Garner School – and about half of the school's students transferred to Garner from nearby school districts. Now Garner ISD features a full secondary program and will have its first high school graduates in the year of 2025.

In 2009, the school district was rated "recognized" by the Texas Education Agency.

== Students ==
=== Academics ===
STAAR - Percent at Level II Satisfactory Standard or Above (Sum of All Grades Tested)
Subject	Garner ISD	Region 11	State of Texas
Reading	86%	76%	73%
Mathematics	78%	78%	76%
Writing	81%	72%	69%
Science	79%	81%	79%
Soc. Studies	92%	80%	77%
All Tests	82%	77%	75%

Students in Brock typically outperform local region and statewide averages on standardized tests. In 2015-2016 State of Texas Assessments of Academic Readiness (STAAR) results, 82% of students in Brock ISD met Level II Satisfactory standards, compared with 77% in Region 11 and 75% in the state of Texas.

=== Demographics ===
In the 2015-2016 school year, the school district had a total of 178 students, ranging from pre-kindergarten through grade 8. As of the 2015-2016 school year, the ethnic distribution of the school district was 77.5% White, 19.7% Hispanic, 0.6% African American, 0.6% Asian, 0.0% American Indian, 0.0% Pacific Islander, and 1.7% from two or more races. Economically disadvantaged students made up 46.6% of the student body.
