= 40th Virginia Cavalry Battalion =

Confederate army division

The 40th Virginia Cavalry Battalion was a cavalry battalion which served in the Confederate States Army during the American Civil War. It was organized in July 1863 with six companies and served in the Department of Richmond. In September it was merged with 32nd Virginia Cavalry Battalion to form the 42nd Virginia Cavalry Battalion.

== See also ==
- List of Virginia Civil War units

== Sources ==
- 40th Virginia Cavalry Battalion page
