= 24th Virginia Cavalry Regiment =

- Flag of Virginia, 1861
- Active: June 1864 – April 1865
- Disbanded: April 1865
- Country: Confederacy
- Allegiance: Confederate States of America
- Branch: Confederate States Army
- Type: Cavalry
- Engagements: American Civil War: Overland Campaign; Siege of Petersburg; Valley Campaigns of 1864; Appomattox Campaign

The 24th Virginia Cavalry Regiment was a cavalry regiment raised in Virginia for service in the Confederate States Army during the American Civil War. It fought mostly with the Army of Northern Virginia.

Virginia's 24th Cavalry Regiment was organized in June, 1864, by consolidating eight companies of the 42nd Battalion Virginia Cavalry and two companies of Dearing's Confederate Cavalry. This unit served in General Gary's Brigade, Army of Northern Virginia, and fought in various conflicts around Richmond. Later it was involved in the Appomattox Campaign and surrendered with 19 officers and 144 men. Its commanders were Colonel William T. Robins, Lieutenant Colonel Theophilus G. Barham, and Major John R. Robertson.

== See also ==
- List of Virginia Civil War units
