= 582d Air Resupply and Communications Wing =

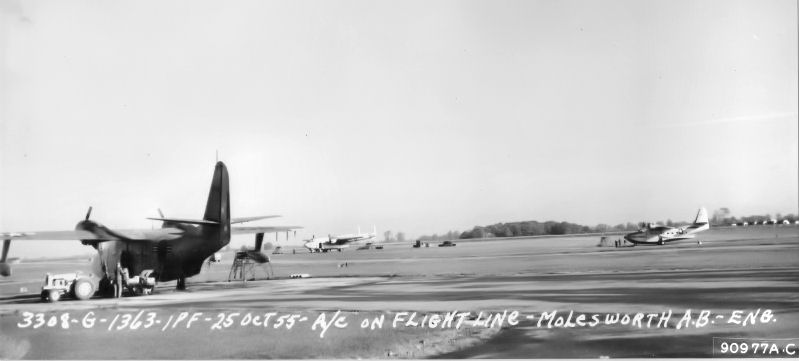
- SA-16 Albatrosses of the 582d Air Resupply Group – 25 October 1955
- Active: 1943–1944; 1951–1956
- Country: United States
- Branch: United States Air Force
- Role: Psychological Warfare
- Motto: Libertas Per Veritatem (Latin for 'Liberty Through Truth')

Insignia
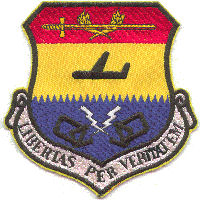
- Patch with 582d Air Resupply And Communications Wing emblem (Note: Approved 14 April 1953. Description: per fess indented or and azure the silhouette of a transport plane sable and in base a broken chain of three links proper between two lightning bolts points conjoined argent, on a chief gules a wreath surmounted by a sword fesswise, hilt to dexter, both of the first [color mentioned].)

The 582d Air Resupply and Communications Wing is an inactive United States Air Force wing. Its last duty assignment was at Great Falls Air Force Base, Montana.

The first predecessor of the wing was the 472d Bombardment Group, which trained Boeing B-29 Superfortress crews for combat deployment until being disbanded in 1944 at Clovis Army Air Field. The wing was activated in 1952 and trained for psychological operations. Although the wing was inactivated in 1953, its operational group, the 582d Air Resupply Group deployed to RAF Molesworth, England, where it conducted special operations until inactivating in October 1956.

In 1985, the 582d Air Resupply and Communications Wing and the 472d Bombardment Group were consolidated as the 472d Special Operations Wing, but the consolidated unit has not been active.

== History ==
=== Very heavy bomber training ===
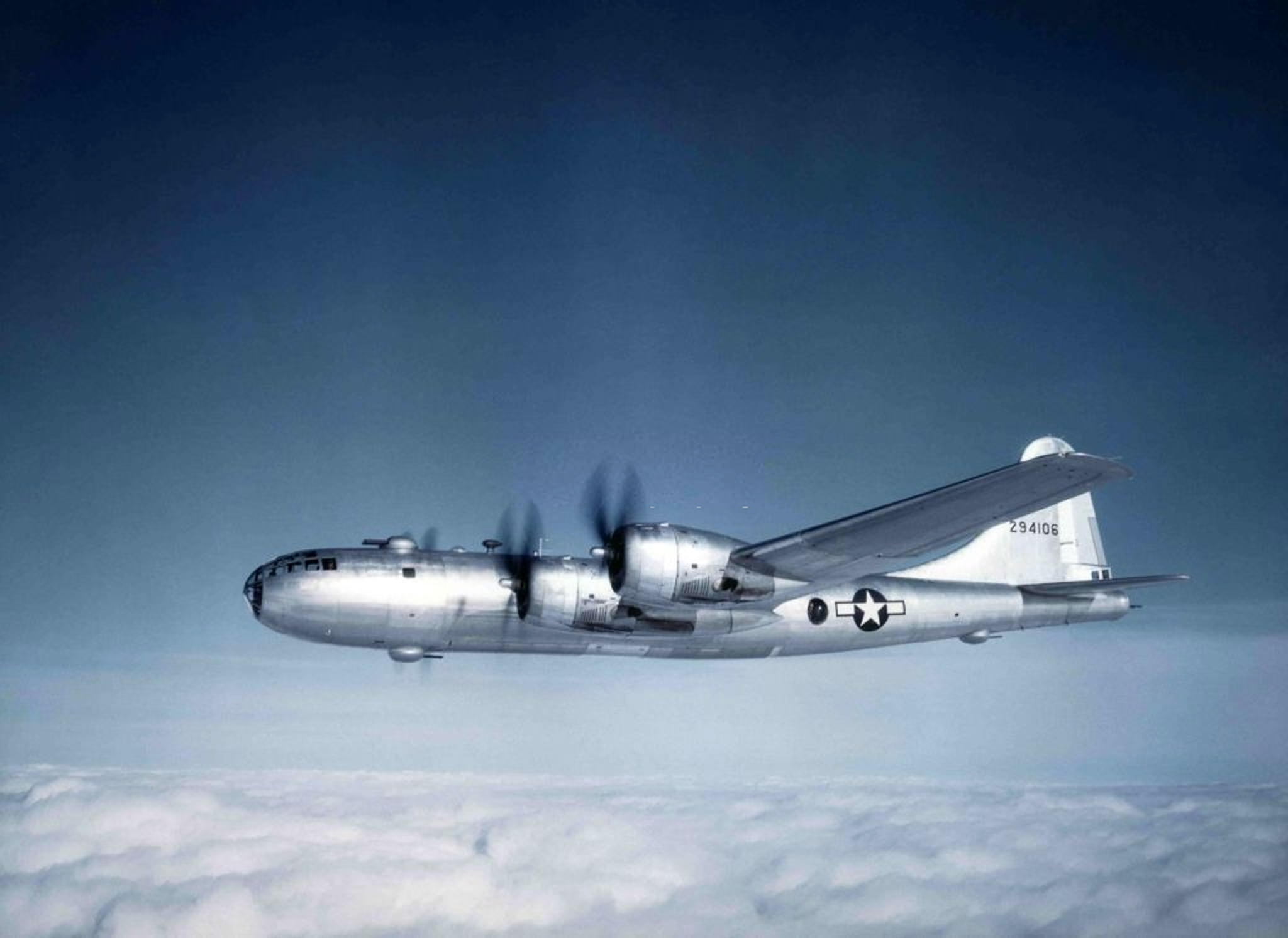
B-29 Superfortress as flown by the 472d Group (Note: Aircraft is Boeing B-29A-30-BN Superfortress, serial 42-94106.)

The first predecessor of the wing, the 472d Bombardment Group, was activated on 1 September 1943 at Smoky Hill Army Air Field, Kansas. The 808th, 809th, 810th and 811th Bombardment Squadrons were simultaneously activated and assigned to the group. Although the 472d's mission was to train aircrews on the Boeing B-29 Superfortress, the squadrons also flew Boeing B-17 Flying Fortresses. The group was assigned to the 58th Bombardment Wing, which returned to Smoky Hill from Marietta Army Air Field in the middle of the month. The 472nd Bombardment Group was to be the initial group to receive the prototype YB-29 and first production B-29 Superfortresses.

President Roosevelt wanted B-29 bombing raids against Japan to start by January 1944. However, delays in the B-29 program forced General Arnold to admit to the president that the bombing campaign against Japan could not begin until May 1944 at the earliest. The crews of the B-29 needed a degree of specialist training that was not required for crews of other, less complex aircraft. It usually took 27 weeks to train a pilot, 15 to train a navigator, and 12 to train a gunner. The complexity of the B-29 was such that a lengthy process of crew integration had to take place before combat deployment could begin. By the end of December 1943, only 73 pilots had qualified for the B-29 and very few crews had been brought together as a complete team.

After the initial groups of the 58th Wing completed conversion training on the B-29, the 472d and its squadrons moved to Clovis Army Air Field, New Mexico about 7 December 1943 to begin training follow-on B-29 crews. However the group also was involved in secret testing of the B-29 for suitability in carrying Atomic Bombs, which were being developed at Los Alamos, New Mexico.

However, the Army Air Forces was finding that standard military units like the 472d, based on relatively inflexible tables of organization were not well adapted to the training mission. Accordingly, it adopted a more functional system in which each base was organized into a separate numbered unit including both operational and support elements. The group was disbanded, and its elements were combined with support units at Clovis to form the 234th AAF Base Unit (Combat Crew Training School, Bombardment, Very Heavy).

=== Special operations ===
The 582d Air Resupply and Communications Wing was activated at Mountain Home Air Force Base, Idaho on 24 September 1952, and moved to Great Falls Air Force Base, Montana, along with Air Resupply and Communications Service in May 1953. As the previous two air resupply wings had done, the 582d spent its first year training and preparing its personnel for the psychological warfare mission. In August 1953, the wing was inactivated, along with two of its four squadrons, and its remaining elements were consolidated into the wing's operational group, which was redesignated the 582d Air Resupply Group. In early 1954, it deployed to RAF Molesworth, United Kingdom and set up operations in Europe.

The 582d Group was assigned to Third Air Force and provided the bulk of its air support to the Army 10th Special Forces Group, which had been transferred in total from Fort Bragg, North Carolina, to Bad Tölz, West Germany. For the next two and one-half years, the 582d worked closely with the 10th Group providing airdrop, resupply, and airland support with its B-29 and Fairchild C-119 Flying Boxcar aircraft.

The Grumman SA-16 Albatross was utilized for amphibious missions, including night water-infiltration/exfiltration operations. Assigned SA-16s were also tasked to fly classified courier missions throughout the Mediterranean, Middle East and southern Europe.

By the mid-1950s the Air Force redirected its priorities away from psychological operations, the 582d Group was the last remaining unit with this mission, and it was inactivated on 25 October 1956. The group's remaining special operations were transferred to the 42d Troop Carrier Squadron, which was activated at Molesworth the same day.

== Lineage ==
472d Bombardment Group

- Constituted as the 472nd Bombardment Group (Heavy) on 19 May 1943

Activated on 1 September 1943
Redesignated 472nd Bombardment Group, Very Heavy on 1 December 1943
Disbanded on 1 April 1944
Reconstituted and consolidated with the 582d Air Resupply and Communications Wing as the 472d Special Operations Wing on 31 July 1985

472d Special Operations Wing

- Established as the 582d Air Resupply and Communications Wing on 3 September 1952

Activated on 24 September 1952
Inactivated on 14 August 1953
Consolidated with the 472nd Bombardment Group as the 472d Special Operations Wing on 31 July 1985

472d Combat Support Group

- Established as the 582d Air Resupply and Communications Group on 3 September 1952

Activated on 24 September 1952
Redesignated 582d Air Resupply Group on 14 August 1953
Inactivated 25 October 1956
Redesignated 472d Combat Support Group on 31 July 1985

=== Assignments ===
472d Wing

- 58th Bombardment Wing, 1 September 1943 – 1 April 1944
- Air Resupply And Communications Service, 24 September 1952 – 14 August 1953

472d Group

- 582d Air Resupply and Communications Wing, 24 September 1952
- Military Air Transport Service, 14 August 1953
- Third Air Force, 25 January 1954 – 25 October 1956

=== Components ===
472d Wing

- 808th Bombardment Squadron, 1 September 1943 – 1 April 1944
- 809th Bombardment Squadron, 1 September 1943 – 1 April 1944
- 810th Bombardment Squadron, 1 September 1943 – 1 April 1944
- 811th Bombardment Squadron, 1 September 1943 – 1 April 1944
- 582d Air Resupply and Communications Group, 24 September 1952 – 25 October 1956

472d Group

- 582d Air Materials Assembly Squadron, 24 September 1952 – 24 October 1956
- 582d Air Resupply and Communications Squadron (later 582d Air Resupply Squadron), 24 September 1952 – 24 October 1956
- 582d Holding and Briefing Squadron, 24 September 1952 – 14 August 1953
- 582d Reproduction Squadron, 24 September 1952 – 14 August 1953

=== Stations ===
- Smoky Hill Army Air Field, Kansas, 1 September 1943
- Clovis Army Air Field, New Mexico, 7 December 1943 – 1 April 1944
- Mountain Home Air Force Base, Idaho, 24 September 1952
- Great Falls Air Force Base, Montana, 1 May 1953 (Note: The wing and the group were stationed together until the wing inactivated.)
- Wiesbaden Air Base, Germany, 25 January 1954
- RAF Molesworth, England, 21 February 1954 – 25 October 1956

=== Aircraft ===
- Boeing B-17 Flying Fortress
- Boeing B-29 Superfortress, 1943–1944, 1951–1956
- Fairchild C-119 Flying Boxcar 1951–1956
- Grumman SA-16 Albatross 1953–1956

== See also ==
- Air Force Special Operations Command For current organization of USAF special operations forces.
