= Garner, Texas =

Garner
- Unincorporated community Census designated place
- Location within the state of Texas Garner (the United States)
- Coordinates: 32°49′26″N 98°00′02″W
- Country: United States
- State: Texas
- County: Parker

Area
  - Total: 3.47 sq mi (8.98 km^{2})
- Elevation: 955 ft (291 m)
- Time zone: UTC-6 (Central (CST))
  - Summer (DST): UTC-5 (CDT)
- GNIS feature ID: 2805833

Garner is an unincorporated community and census designated place (CDP) on Farm to Market Road 113 northwest of Weatherford in Parker County, Texas, United States. As of the 2020 census, Garner had a population of 397.

== History ==
The original settlement in the area was called Trappe Springs and was founded in the 1850s by a small group of families. The current town was settled in the 1880s, half a mile west of the original site, and named Garner after a local gin operator. For most of the 20th century, the town has experienced steady growth, from approximately 40 residents in 1914 to 98 in 1990. A post office was located in Garner from around 1890 to 1970.

The town has a Baptist church, an elementary/middle school, and several small businesses. Much of the surrounding land is used for livestock farming.

The post office and general store in Garner were run for many years by a Mr. James A. Vance. A story about him is in a book by Ben K. Green, Wild Cow Tales. The story is called "The One That Got Away". Mr. Vance was born June 14, 1871, arrived in Garner on October 7, 1894, and died at home in Garner in 1964.

Two residents of the town are credited with invention of the regional domino game "42" in 1887.

== Demographics ==
Historical population
Census	Pop.	Note	%±
2020	397		—
U.S. Decennial Census; 1850–1900 1910; 1920 1930 1940; 1950 1960 1970; 1980 1990 2000; 2010 2020

Garner first appeared as a census designated place in the 2020 U.S. census.

=== 2020 Census ===
Garner CDP, Texas – Racial and ethnic composition Note: the US Census treats Hispanic/Latino as an ethnic category. This table excludes Latinos from the racial categories and assigns them to a separate category. Hispanics/Latinos may be of any race.
Race / Ethnicity (NH = Non-Hispanic)	Pop 2020	% 2020
White alone (NH)	347	87.41%
Black or African American alone (NH)	0	0.00%
Native American or Alaska Native alone (NH)	0	0.00%
Asian alone (NH)	2	0.50%
Native Hawaiian or Pacific Islander alone (NH)	0	0.00%
Other race alone (NH)	0	0.00%
Mixed race or Multiracial (NH)	7	1.76%
Hispanic or Latino (any race)	41	10.33%
Total	397	100.00%
