= 32nd Virginia Cavalry Battalion =

The 32nd Virginia Cavalry Battalion was a cavalry battalion which served in the Confederate States Army during the American Civil War. It was formed in November 1862 with two companies and served in the Department of Richmond. In September 1863 it was merged with the 40th Virginia Cavalry Battalion to form the 42nd Virginia Cavalry Battalion.

== See also ==
- List of Virginia Civil War units

== Sources ==
- 32nd Virginia Cavalry Battalion
