= 42nd Street =

42nd Street most commonly refers to:

- 42nd Street (Manhattan), a major crosstown street in the New York City borough of Manhattan

It may also refer to:

- 42nd Street (film), a 1933 American Warner Bros. musical film with lyrics by Al Dubin, and music by Harry Warren
  - 42nd Street, a 1932 novel by Bradford Ropes which was adapted for the 1933 film and subsequent musical
  - "42nd Street" (song), title song from the film
  - 42nd Street (musical), a 1980 musical with a book by Michael Stewart and Mark Bramble
- 42nd Street (mental health charity), a charity in Manchester, UK

== New York City Subway ==
- Times Square–42nd Street station, a station complex consisting of:
  - Times Square – 42nd Street (IRT Broadway – Seventh Avenue Line); serving the 1, 2, and 3 trains
  - Times Square – 42nd Street (BMT Broadway Line); serving the N, Q, R, and W trains
  - Times Square (IRT 42nd Street Shuttle); the northern terminal of the S (42nd Street Shuttle) train
  - Times Square (IRT Flushing Line), serving the 7 and <7> trains
- 42nd Street – Port Authority Bus Terminal (IND Eighth Avenue Line), serving the A, C, and E trains
- 42nd Street–Bryant Park/Fifth Avenue station, a station complex consisting of:
  - 42nd Street – Bryant Park (IND Sixth Avenue Line), serving the B, D, F, <F>, and M trains
  - Fifth Avenue (IRT Flushing Line), serving the 7 and <7> trains
- Grand Central–42nd Street station, a station complex consisting of:
  - Grand Central (IRT 42nd Street Shuttle), the southern terminal of the S (42nd Street Shuttle) train
  - Grand Central – 42nd Street (IRT Lexington Avenue Line); serving the 4, 5, 6, and <6> trains
  - Grand Central (IRT Flushing Line), serving the 7 and <7> trains
- 42nd Street station (IRT Second Avenue Line), demolished station of the Second Avenue elevated
- 42nd Street station (IRT Third Avenue Line), demolished station of the Third Avenue elevated
- 42nd Street station (IRT Sixth Avenue Line), demolished station of the Sixth Avenue elevated
- 42nd Street station (IRT Ninth Avenue Line), demolished station of the Ninth Avenue elevated
- 42nd Street (IND Second Avenue Line), planned station of the Second Avenue subway

The IRT Flushing Line and IRT 42nd Street Shuttle run under 42nd Street in Manhattan.
