= 42nd Battalion =

42nd Battalion may refer to:

- 42nd Virginia Cavalry Battalion, a unit of the Confederate States Army
- Robin Hood Battalion, (42nd (The Robin Hoods, Sherwood Foresters) Anti-Aircraft Battalion), a unit of the United Kingdom Army
- 42nd (East Lancashire) Infantry Division (42 Battalion Machine Gun Corps), a unit of the United Kingdom Army
- 42 Commando, a unit of the United Kingdom Royal Marine Corps
- 42nd Battalion (Australia), a unit of the Australian Army which served in World War I and World War II
- 42nd Battalion (Royal Highlanders of Canada), CEF, an infantry battalion of the Canadian Expeditionary Force during World War I
- 42nd Battalion, CEF, reserve infantry regiment of the Canadian Army
- 42nd Battalion, Singapore Armoured Regiment, one of the 4 armoured infantry battalions of the Singapore Army

== See also ==
- 42nd Division (disambiguation)
- 42nd Brigade (disambiguation)
- 42nd Regiment (disambiguation)
- 42nd Squadron (disambiguation)
- 42nd Group (disambiguation)
