= 42 (dominoes) =

Trick-taking dominoes game

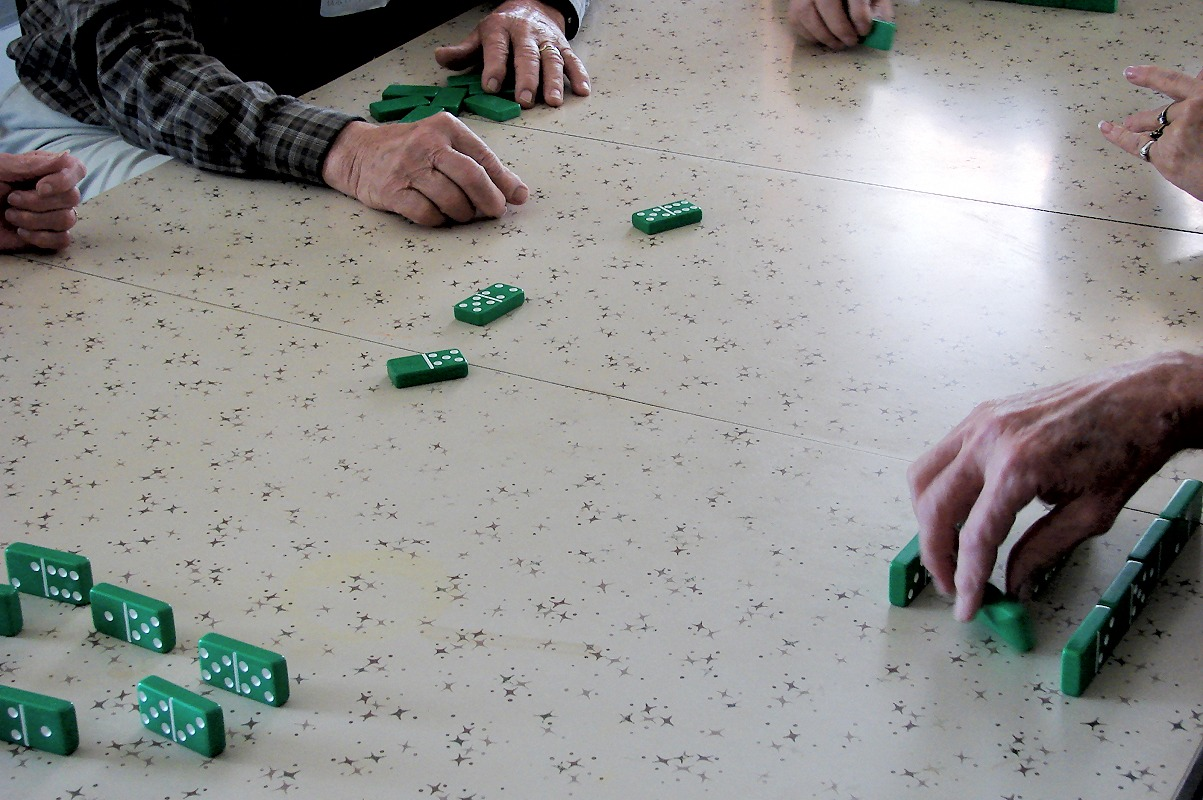
A game of 42

42, also known as Texas 42, is a trick-taking game played with a standard set of double-six dominoes. 42 is often referred to as the "national game of Texas". Tournaments are held in many towns, and the State Championship tournament is held annually in Hallettsville, Texas on the first Saturday of March each year. In 2011 it was designated the official State Domino Game of Texas.

== History ==
According to a 1985 news article written by Christopher Evans of the Fort Worth Star-Telegram, the game originated in Garner, Texas. Two local boys, William Thomas and Walter Earl, developed the game in 1887 in response to a general disapproval of card-playing games held by many Protestants at that time. William and Walter incorporated dominoes in their game, which mimicked the mechanics of a trick-taking card game like pitch. The game they developed, which was the precursor to today's 42, found acceptance because dominoes did not carry the negative stigma of card-playing. From there, the game spread throughout Texas.

== Rules ==
=== Object ===
The game is played by four people, in teams of two each, where the partners sit across from each other. The object of the game is to be the first team to reach seven "marks" or 250 points. The game consists of a number of hands (a maximum of 13 hands when playing for marks).

=== Bid ===
Before each hand, and based on the seven dominoes drawn by each player, the first person clockwise from the dealer will either pass or bid in order to win the right to choose the trumps and style of play for that hand. Typically, the bidder determines what to bid by estimating how many of the forty-two total points the team will win based on those seven dominoes. The minimum bid is 30. If all players pass the dealer must bid 30. In some variations the dominoes are reshuffled and the hand restarts. The 42 points consist of one point for each of the seven tricks, plus 35 points from the five "count" dominoes whose total pips are a multiple of 5 (the 6-4 (🁟) and double-five (🁙) tiles for 10 points each, as well as the 4-1 (🁎), 3-2 (🁈), and 5-0 (🁔) tiles for 5 points each). The reward for attaining the bid is typically a tally mark, or in numerical scoring, the reward is the point total the player bid in a race to 250. The bids can occasionally be stated in "marks", signifying the tally mark awarded to a winning hand. The maximum opening bid under standard bidding is two marks, or "84", with each successive bid being one additional mark. Each player outbidding the opening maximum bid would result in a bid of 5 marks. There are many variations and exceptions to standard bidding, which are covered in Special Contracts, below.

=== Hand ===
After each player gets one chance to bid, the highest bidder chooses the trump for that hand, which can consist of designating as the trump one of the following: a particular "suit" (blanks through sixes, i.e. all tiles containing a six on one or both sides behaves as a trump when played); doubles (any tile containing the same number of pips on each of the two halves of the marked surface of that tile will behave as the trump in that hand when played); or may play with no trump, also known as "follow me".

Play then proceeds in a clockwise fashion with the high bidder having the first play of the first trick. All players must follow the lead with the same suit if possible, known as "following suit", unless the other end of the domino is the trump suit. If they do not have a domino matching the suit of the lead, they may play any domino. When led, each tile is considered to belong to the suit of its higher number, unless the tile is a trump. For example, the 4:3 domino is a 4 unless threes are trumps. The highest valued domino of the leading suit wins, unless a trump is played, in which case the highest trump wins. In any suit, the double of that suit is highest, and then the tiles are ranked by the off-suit pip.

The winner of the trick usually moves the played dominoes to an area near their hand, face up. The winner then plays first on the next hand. If playing for marks, play continues until the bidding team has scored enough to match their bid ("made their contract"), or else is "set" by not winning enough tricks and points to match their bid. At that time, the team with the highest score and who has made their contract is awarded the correct number of marks. When playing for points, play continues until all seven tricks have been won. The high-bidder receives the points they win if they make their bid. If not, the team that sets them wins their bid plus any points they took during the hand. Example, if a team with a winning bid of 30 wins 31 points, they add 31 points to their total. If that team does not reach their bid (30 in this case), they get zero points. The other team receives the bid amount plus the points won during the hand.

In some cases, when playing for marks, if the player leading has no chance of losing (e.g., their hand holds the remaining most valuable tiles still in that game), that player may "lay down", meaning they show why they can't lose by exposing the remaining dominoes. A miscalculation here (a domino not being a certain winner) will usually result in the automatic loss of the game. However, it is usually done as a time-saver for experienced players.

=== Scoring ===
Each trick is worth one point. There are five "count" pieces (those whose spots total five or ten) that are worth that number of points: the 0-5 (🀶), 1-4 (🀼), and 2-3 (🁂) tiles are worth five points each; the double-five (🁙) and 6-4 (🁟) tiles are each worth ten. The total of all the count pieces (35) plus the seven tricks equals 42, which is the number of points in a hand, hence the name of the game.

1. Marks: A game is typically played for seven marks. This is usually documented with tally marks. Some players mark straight lines that spell out the capital letters ALL.
2. Points: A game is typically played to 250 points. After the hand, if the bidding team reaches their bid they are awarded the number of points taken in the hand (if a team bids 30 and reaches 35, they score 35 for the hand), and the non-bidding team is awarded any points they caught during the hand. If the bidding team does not make their contract they do not score on the hand and the setting team is awarded the bid in addition to any points they caught (if the bid is 30 and the bidding team only catches 26 points, the bidding team receives 0 points while the setting team receives 30 points for the bid and 16 for the points in the hand for a total of 46 points).

=== Special contracts ===
- 84 (Two Marks)

The bidder's team must win all the tricks. Dominoes are played trick atop trick to avoid revealing what has been played thus far in the hand. If the bidder's team succeeds in taking all the tricks, the team earns two marks.

- 42 (One Mark)

The bidder's team must win all the tricks. The hand is played as per usual.

- 30

The minimum bid. Successive bids must be higher than this bid, or the player must pass (make no bid).

The highest bid wins the auction and that player has the right to name the trump suit and lead.

== Terminology ==
There are a number of special terms in the game of 42:

0s
blanks, nils, windows
1s
aces
2s
deuces (or "ducks")
3s
treys
bad offs
offs which if led risk the loss of "count" dominoes (e.g. the 5-1 (🁕) tile)
bones, rocks
dominoes
bull (or big kahuna)
the double of any trump suit
calf
the trump immediately below the cow
count, grease, sugar, game, or money
dominoes worth points
cow (or moo-moo)
the trump immediately below the double
the devil
the 6-3 (🁞) tile
dime
a count which adds up to 10
domination domino
the 2-1 (🁀) tile
double shooter
bidding 84
follow-me
a hand called to be played with no trumps
Greer County
the 6-5 (🁠) tile
have them three deep
to have three of the trump suit chosen by an opponent
nello, nil
low
nickel
a count which adds up to 5
off(s)
domino(es) in bidder's hand that isn't trump suit or double
the 1-0 (🀸) tile
roach, the Diane, Little Willy
pregnant
one who pulls too many dominoes when drawing
punt
play a low domino in an attempt to lose the lead
rabbit's foot
the 2-3 (🁂) tile
renege
to not follow suit when appropriate
rollover (also lay down, walker)
a hand that cannot be beaten
shake, wash, stir
to shuffle the dominoes
shooter
bidding 42
spite bid
a bid made solely to deny an opponent the trump selection
suit
number on one end of the domino
trash
dominoes worth no points
trump
as a verb, to play a trump on a non-trump
trumps and doubles
a situation where the person leading knows they can capture all remaining tricks because their hand consists only of doubles and a controlling set of trumps
walk
a typically low-ranking domino led when all dominoes that can win it have been played

== Optional rules ==
=== Nel-O ===
Also known as nillo, nil, low, nello, nullo, or low-boy, nel-o is an optional house rule that allows players with an otherwise low-scoring hand to bid. All players must agree to allow nel-o bidding before the game begins. Sometimes nel-o is only allowed by the dealer, if the first three players all passed.

A player may choose to bid nel-o, instead of bidding a number or passing, if they have particularly low dominoes in a hand (the -blanks and -ones of several suits). This means they intend to win the hand by not catching any tricks at all. Their partner then turns their dominoes face down, and does not participate in that hand. The opposing team will play their lowest dominoes, trying to force the nel-o bidder into catching a trick.

The nel-o bidder's team scores a mark if they catch no tricks. If the nel-o bidder catches even one trick, the hand is immediately over, and the opposing team scores a mark.

Other variations of nel-o treat doubles in a special way. Doubles may be weighted either as the high of their suit, as a suit of their own, or least commonly as the low of their suit. If any of these variants are used, a declaration is required, and all players must agree to allow them before play begins.

Nel-o rules may also be used in the domino game "Shoot the Moon".

=== Splash ===
The bidder bids three marks, and their partner controls the game as if the partner won the bid, without discussion with the bidder. The bidder must have three doubles to do this. Some variants have a "Splash" worth two marks.

=== Plunge ===
Also called Crash, this variation is exactly like Splash, except that four (or in some variants, three) marks are bid and the bidder must have four doubles. Jump bids are allowed for Splash and Plunge. All tricks must be won for a successful plunge bid. If the opponents win even one trick, the plunge bid fails and the opponents get the marks.

=== Sevens ===
Another less-common rule is to allow a player to bid Sevens. Instead of the highest domino winning each trick, the domino whose sum is closest to seven wins. Dominoes are classified as "sevens" (the 4-3 (🁐), 5-2 (🁖), and 6-1 (🁜) tiles), "one away" (dominoes adding to six or eight), "two away" (adding to five or nine), etc. When more than one domino of the same distance from seven is played, the first domino played is considered the winner. A player must bid at least 42 (one mark) to go in sevens, and losing even one trick will set the bidder. When a bid of "sevens" wins the contract, all players reveal their dominoes face-up and order them from sevens to maximum-away. Dominoes must be played in this order by all players.

An even less common version of Sevens is looper, where the bidder takes it for less than 42 points (one mark) and can lose a trick.

Both Sevens and Looper are not widely played and are rarely allowed by legitimate 42 players.

=== Stacking ===
In some houses of play, no stacking of dominoes is allowed regardless of the winning bid. In others, a bid of one mark entitles the contract-winning team to stack the won tricks in two stacks of equal height, where a bid of two or more marks entitles them to stack the won tricks in a single stack.

== Variations ==
- 84, a variant played with two sets of double-six dominoes. Play usually consists of eight players. Some of the terminology also differs, such as bidding "pistol" instead of "nello". Each player draws 7 dominoes. Minimum bid is 60. There is no kitty. Can bid by increments of 1 (some count are worth 5 points so odd point totals are possible)
- 88, a variant played with two sets of dominoes. Play usually consists of six players. Each player draws 9 dominoes. Minimum bid is 60. There are 2 dominoes left over which the winning bidder gets to elect to keep or discard (cannot discard count). Can bid by increments of 1 (some count are worth 5 points so odd point totals are possible)
- 72, a variant played with two sets of dominoes, blanks removed. Play usually consists of four players. Each player gets 10 dominoes, the starting bid is 40. The two remaining dominoes, known as "The Widow", goes to whoever gets the bid. That person must then throw away two dominoes, though they are not allowed to throw away trumps or count. If this can't be avoided, any count goes to the other team, and any trump that is thrown out must be turned face up.
- [Shoot the] Moon is a variant played with 3 people, no teams. In this game, no domino has a special value, and all tricks remain worth one point. The game is played by removing all of the blank dominoes except for the double blank. Each player draws 7 dominoes leaving one that is set aside. The player who wins the bid has the option of trading any one of their dominoes for the one not chosen. If a player is denied the possibility of winning, or set, then they instead lose the amount they bid from their total. The game is played to 21 points, and the minimum bid is 4. If a player states during the bidding phase that they will "shoot the moon", then they must catch all tricks. Doing so is worth 21 points. Failing to catch all 7 tricks results in a loss of 21 points. This is the highest possible bid, unless another player elects to "shoot it over" the player who is shooting the moon; this makes their own bid worth 42 points. There are no special contracts in this game.
- Geezer uses a set of double-seven dominoes and each player draws nine. The 7-3 adds another ten count and the minimum bid is 39. A 46 bid will out-bid one mark and conventions include "dip", "dive", and "plunge" bids depending on the number of doubles (3, 4, or 5) held. A dip is two marks, a dive is three, and a plunge is four. An opening 41 bid invites the watery responses, but a naked dip, dive, or plunge is allowed. Otherwise a two-mark bid is the maximum allowed except to overbid another. Third bidder must bid or the fourth bidder may either ask his partner to name trumps or play 39 for two marks. The eccentrics who developed this game also added strange low bids for nello, in which anything can be low in its suit. Thus if 3s are low, a 3-6 is lower than the 6-0. The successful bidder's partner does not play in a nello game. There is also a 51 bid, in which count is trump and 5 or 10 count dominoes must be played in response to a count lead of the bidder and the bidder must catch all except three tricks with no count on the three.
- The Big Game is a variant for players who want a challenging game based on a larger set of tiles instead of special bids. (It is a mathematically accurate extension of 42 from 7 to 11 tricks.) All rules in The Big Game are the same as "standard 42" except:
  - Play is with a double-8 set of dominoes. (Removing the ten tiles with 9s on them from a double-9 set leaves a 45-tile double-8 set.)
  - The count tiles are still those with 5 or 10 pips. This adds 2 more count tiles worth ten each: the 7-3 and 8-2. Counters are thus: 0-5, 1-4, 2-3, 4-6, 5-5, 7-3, and 8-2. (The 7-8, a 15-point tile, is not a count tile.)
  - In the deal, each of the four players takes 11 tiles each. One tile is not dealt and is left face-down.
  - The minimum starting bid is 42. Bidding proceeds clockwise, and players continue in the bidding process until they pass. (Unlike 42, players may make more than one bid, until they pass.) A Game is 400 points across hands.
  - The bid winner looks at the one tile left over face-down from the deal. If it is count, he MUST take it into his hand. If it is not count, he may choose whether to take it into his hand. If the bid winner takes the tile into his hand, he discards face-down some other non-count tile to take his hand back down to 11 tiles. All count must be in play.
  - If either the 3-7 or the 2-8 are led, the person who leads the tile may optionally announce that the lower number on the tile is the suit of the trick. So 3-7 tile can lead the trick as a 3-suit tile (the third highest tile in the 3's suit), or 2-8 tile as the second highest tile in the 2's suit. This rule only applies to leads of the 3-7 or 2-8, only when announced by the trick leader, and only when these tiles are not members of the trump suit.
- 140, is another variant played with a double-nine set of dominoes. Play usually consists of six players.
  - 6 players play as 3 teams of 2 players per team, sitting alternatively (A-B-C-A-B-C).
  - Each player draws 9 tiles. This leaves 1 tile remaining in the boneyard (which the winning bidder can choose to exchange it with one of his tiles, if he wishes).
  - The minimum bid is 100. There are 9 tricks and each trick is worth 5 points. Bids start in 100 and go on steps of five until 140 (100, 105, 110, 115..., 140); then in multiples of 140 (or marks). As in 42, bids of 1 or 2 marks can be made, if no one has bid that amount.
  - Total of 140 points to be won in all hands: 95 count points (tiles with 5, 10, or 15 pips) + 9 tricks x 5 points per trick = 95 + 9×5 = 140. Hence the game name.
  - Score is by points (similar as in Moon): Each team keeps track of how many points they make, and gets that many points each turn. The exception is that if the bidder doesn't make his bid, he doesn't get any points for his tricks, and instead gets minus his bid. The opponents receive the number of points they have made, in any case.
  - The first team to reach 500 points wins.
- 3-handed 42 is played by only three players. The blank-ace is removed from the set, and each player draws 9 dominoes. Bidding is usually the same as in traditional 4-handed play (i.e. minimum bid of 30 and so forth).
- When scoring some Texas A&M University students make marks of "A" and "M" around a large "T" to make an A&M logo. Other variations are scoring the dominoes to 250 or spelling XXX then a slash through it to count 7.

== See also ==
- Glossary of domino terms
