= 42nd Illinois Infantry Regiment =

42nd Regiment Illinois Volunteer Infantry
- Illinois state flag
- Active: July 22, 1861, to December 16, 1865
- Disbanded: January 10, 1866
- Country: United States
- Allegiance: Union
- Branch: Infantry
- Size: 1,622 (Total Enrollment)
- Part of: Department of the Missouri; Army of the Mississippi; Army of the Ohio; XIV Corps; XX Corps; IV Corps; Department of Texas
- Nickname: First Douglas Regiment
- Engagements: American Civil War: Battle of Island Number Ten; Siege of Corinth; Battle of Stones River; Tullahoma campaign; Battle of Chickamauga; Battle of Missionary Ridge; Atlanta campaign; Battle of Rocky Face Ridge; Battle of Resaca; Battle of Adairsville; Battle of New Hope Church; Battle of Kennesaw Mountain; Battle of Peachtree Creek; Battle of Atlanta; Battle of Lovejoy's Station; Battle of Jonesborough; Battle of Spring Hill; Battle of Franklin (1864); Battle of Nashville

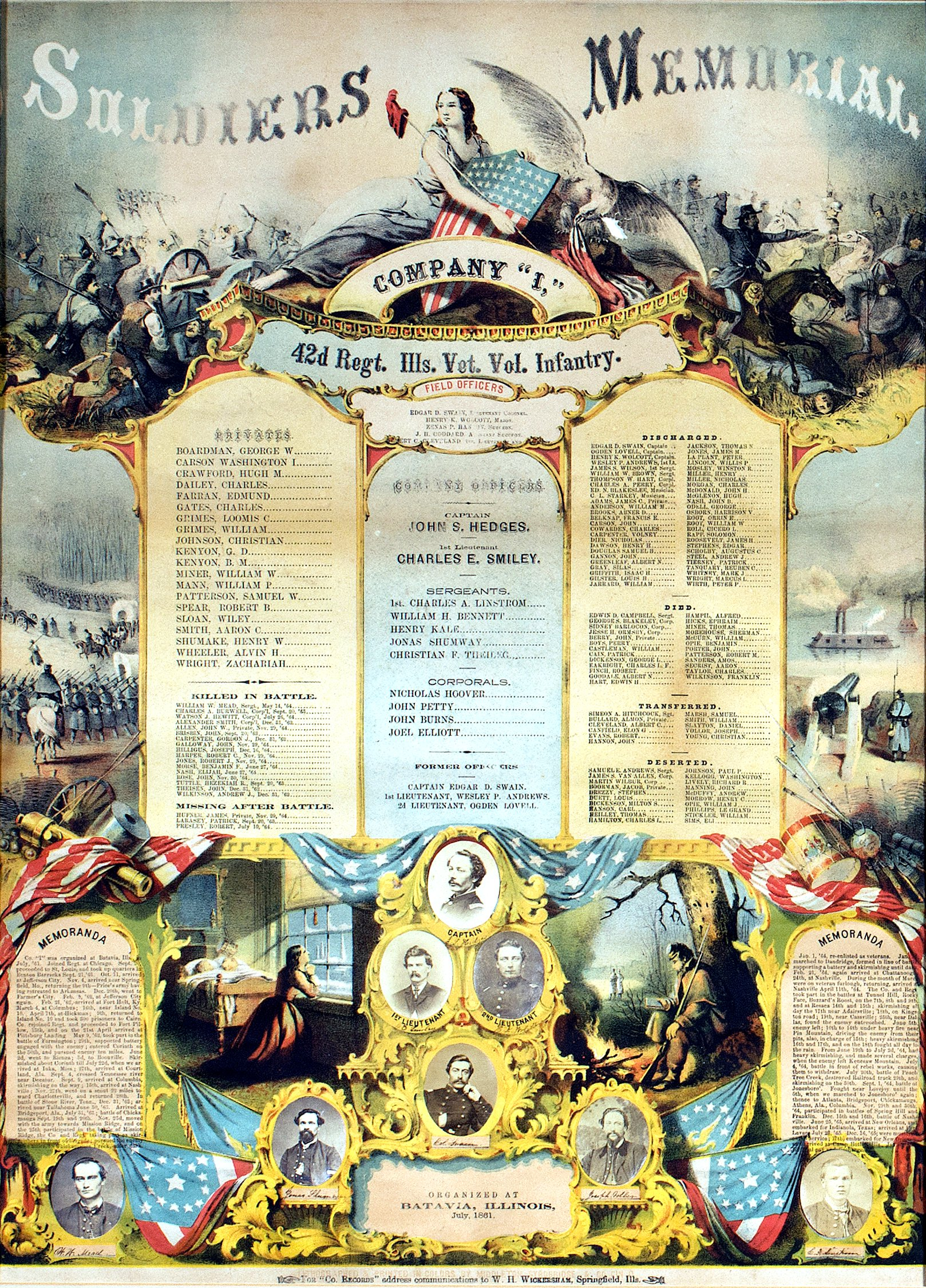
Soldiers Memorial, Company I

The 42nd Regiment Illinois Volunteer Infantry was an infantry regiment that served in the Union Army during the American Civil War. It is one of the 300 fighting regiments.

== Overview ==
The 42nd Illinois Infantry was organized at Chicago, Illinois and mustered into Federal service on July 22, 1861. Left state for St. Louis, Mo., September 20, 1861. Attached to Dept. of Missouri, to February, 1862. Flotilla Brigade, Army of Mississippi, to April, 1862. 1st Brigade, 1st Division, Army Miss., to September, 1862. 1st Brigade, 13th Division, Army of the Ohio, to November, 1862. 3rd Brigade, 3rd Division, Right Wing 14th Army Corps, Army of the Cumberland to January, 1863. 3rd Brigade, 3rd Division, 20th Army Corps, Army of the Cumberland, to October, 1863. 3rd Brigade, 2nd Division, 4th Army Corps to June, 1865. 2nd Brigade, 2nd Division, 4th Army Corps, to August, 1865. Dept. of Texas, to December, 1865.

== Service ==
Joined Fremont at Tipton, Mo., October 18, 1861. Fremont's Campaign against Springfield, Mo., October 18-November 9. Duty at Smithton, Mo., December 13, 1861, to February 3, 1862. March to St. Charles, Mo., thence moved to Fort Holt, Ky., February 2–20, 1862. Operations against New Madrid, Mo., and Island No. 10, Mississippi River, February 28-April 8. Engagement at New Madrid, March 3–4. Actions at Island Number 10, March 15–16 and 25. Action and capture at Tiptonville April 8. Expedition to Fort Pillow, Tenn., April 13–17. Moved to Hamburg Landing, Tenn., April 17–22. Advance on and siege of Corinth, Miss., April 29-May 30. Action at Farmington May 3. Reconnaissance toward Corinth May 8. Action at Farmington May 9. Pursuit to Booneville May 31-June 12. Skirmish at Rienzi June 3 (Detachment). Reconnaissance toward Baldwyn June 3. Camp at Big Springs June 14 to July 22. Moved to Iuka, Miss., July 22, thence to Courtland, Ala. Skirmish at Courtland August 22. Duty along line of Memphis and Charleston R. R. till September 2. March to Nashville, Tenn., September 3–12. Action at Columbia, Tenn., September 9. Siege of Nashville September 12-November 6. Repulse of Forest's attack on Edgefield November 5. Duty at Nashville till December 26. Hardin Pike near Nashville December 3. Advance on Murfreesboro December 26–30. Battle of Stone's River December 30–31, 1862, and January 1–3, 1863. Expedition to Columbia March 5–14. Middle Tennessee or Tullahoma Campaign June 24-July 7. Occupation of Middle Tennessee till August 16. Passage of Cumberland Mountains and Tennessee River and Chickamauga, Ga. Campaign August 16-September 22. Battle of Chickamauga September 19–20. Siege of Chattanooga, Tenn., September 24-November 23. Chattanooga-Ringgold Campaign November 23–27. Orchard Knob November 23–24. Mission Ridge November 25. March to relief of Knoxville, Tenn., and Campaign in East Tennessee November 28, 1863, to January 15, 1864. Camp at Stone's Mill, Tenn., December 27, 1862, to January 15, 1864. Regiment veteranize January 1, 1864. Moved to Dandridge, Tenn., January 15, 1864. Operations about Dandridge January 16–17. Moved to Chattanooga January 21. Veterans on furlough February 21 to April 27. Atlanta, (Ga.) Campaign May 1 to September 8. Demonstration against Rocky Faced Ridge May 8–11. Buzzard's Roost Gap May 8–9. Battle of Resaca May 14–15. Calhoun May 16.Adairsville May 17. Kingston May 18–19. Near Cassville May 19. Advance on Dallas May 22–25. Operations on line of Pumpkin Vine Creek and battles about Dallas, New Hope Church and Allatoona Hills May 25-June 5. Operations about Marietta and against Kenesaw Mountain June 10-July 2. Pine Hill June 11–14. Lost Mountain June 15–17. Assault on Kenesaw June 27. Ruff's Station Smyrna, Camp Ground, July 4. Chattahoochie River July 5–17. Peach Tree Creek July 19–20. Siege of Atlanta July 22-August 25. Flank movement on Jonesboro August 25–30. Battle of Jonesboro August 31-September 1. Lovejoy's Station September 2–6. Moved to Bridgeport, Ala., September 28. March to Chattanooga, thence to Alpine, Ga., and return October 19–30. Nashville Campaign November–December. Columbia, Duck River, November 24–27. Spring Hill November 29. Battle of Franklin November 30. Battle of Nashville December 15–16. Pursuit of Hood, to the Tennessee River, December 17–28. Duty at Huntsville and Decatur, Ala., till April 1, 1865. Expedition to Bull's Gap April 1–22. Moved to Nashville, Tenn., and duty there till June 15. Moved to New Orleans, La., June 15–18, thence to Fort Lavacca, Texas, July 18–23, thence to Camp Irwin and duty there till August 17. Post duty at Port Lavacca till December. Mustered out at Camp Irwin December 16 and discharged at Springfield, Ill., January 10, 1866.

== Casualties ==
The regiment suffered 13 officers and 168 enlisted men who were killed in action or mortally wounded and 5 officers and 201 enlisted men who died of disease, for a total of 387 fatalities. The regiment also suffered 473 wounded. Percentage wise, the regiment lost 11.1% to enemy action and 12.7% to other causes, or a total of 23.8% fatalities, and a total casualty percentage of 40.3%.

== Commanders ==
- Colonel William A. Webb - died on December 24, 1861.
- Colonel George W. Roberts - killed in action on December 31, 1862.
- Colonel Nathan H. Walworth - resigned on April 13, 1864.
- Lieutenant Colonel Edgar D. Swain - mustered out with the regiment.

== Monument ==
There is a monument to the 42nd Illinois Infantry at Chickamauga and Chattanooga National Military Park.

== See also ==
- List of Illinois Civil War Units
- Illinois in the American Civil War
- Federal Ambush
