= 42 class =

42 class or Class 42 may refer to:

- British Rail Class 42
- DRG Class 42
- New South Wales 42 class locomotive
