= 42nd Expeditionary Airlift Squadron =

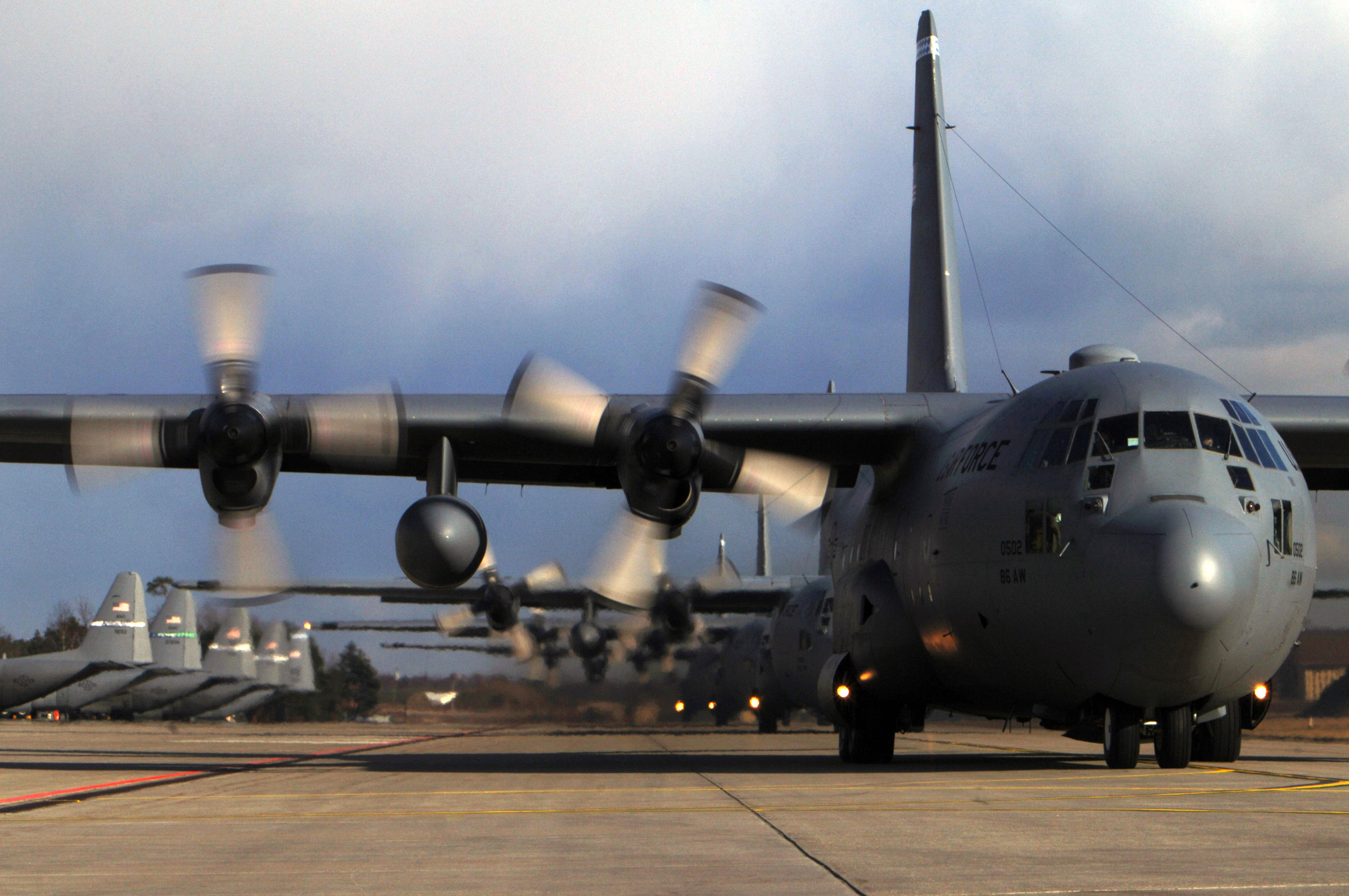
- C-130 Hercules from deployed units at Ramstein Air Base in 2008
- Active: 1942–1944; 1956–1957; 2008–2009
- Country: United States
- Branch: United States Air Force
- Role: Airlift
- Part of: United States Air Forces in Europe
- Engagements: Aleutian Islands Campaign

Insignia
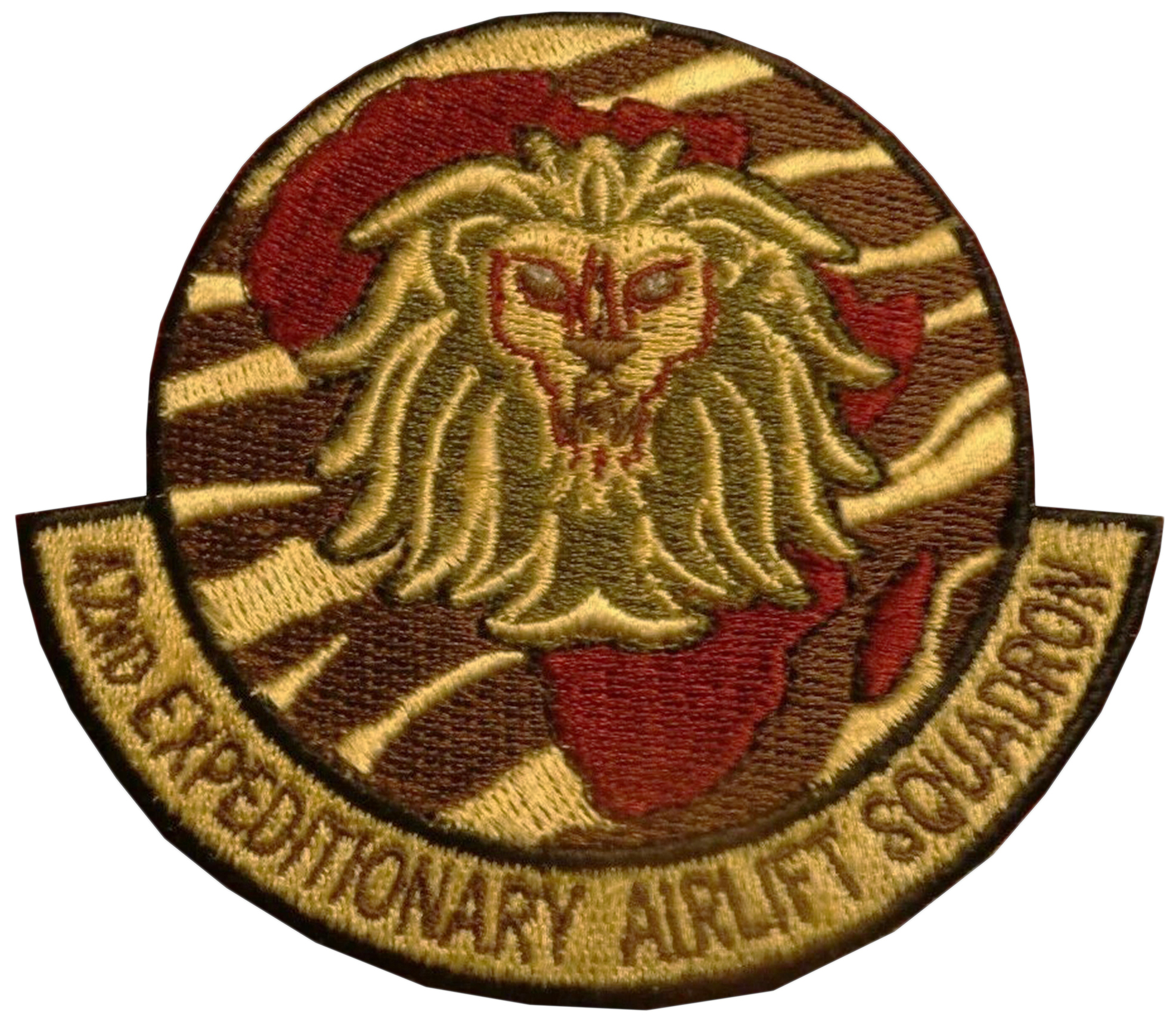
- 42nd Expeditionary Airlift Squadron emblem (Ramstein AB, 2008)

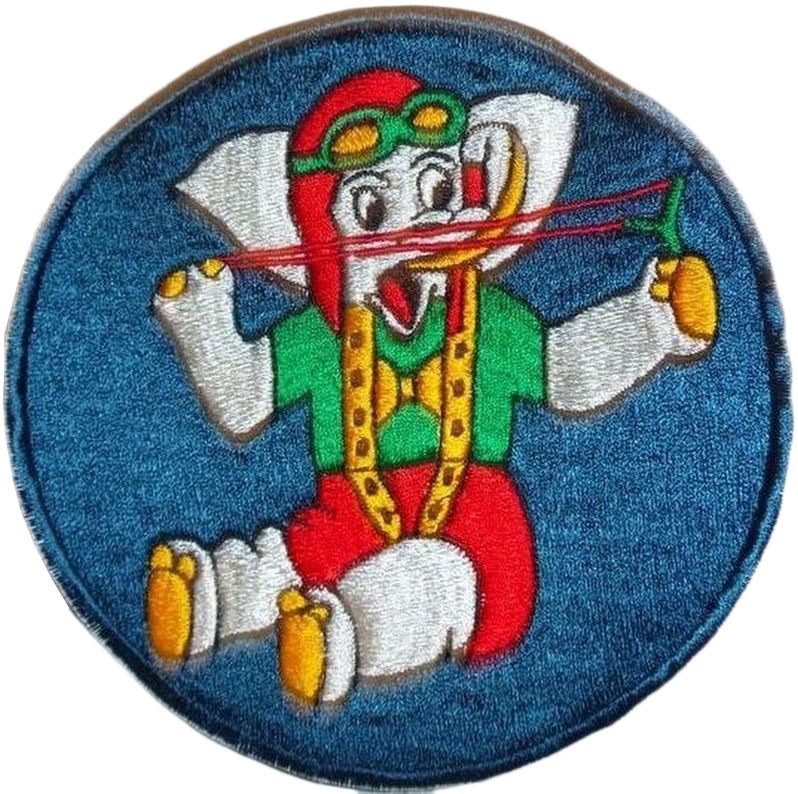
- 42d Troop Carrier Squadron, Medium emblem (RAF Molesworth, 1957)

The 42nd Expeditionary Airlift Squadron, is an inactive provisional unit of the United States Air Force, assigned to United States Air Forces in Europe to activate or inactivate as needed. Originally constituted as the 42nd Transport Squadron in 1942 and redesignated the 42nd Troop Carrier Squadron the same year, it received its present designation in 2007. It was last active at Ramstein Air Base, Germany in 2009.

== History ==
=== World War II ===
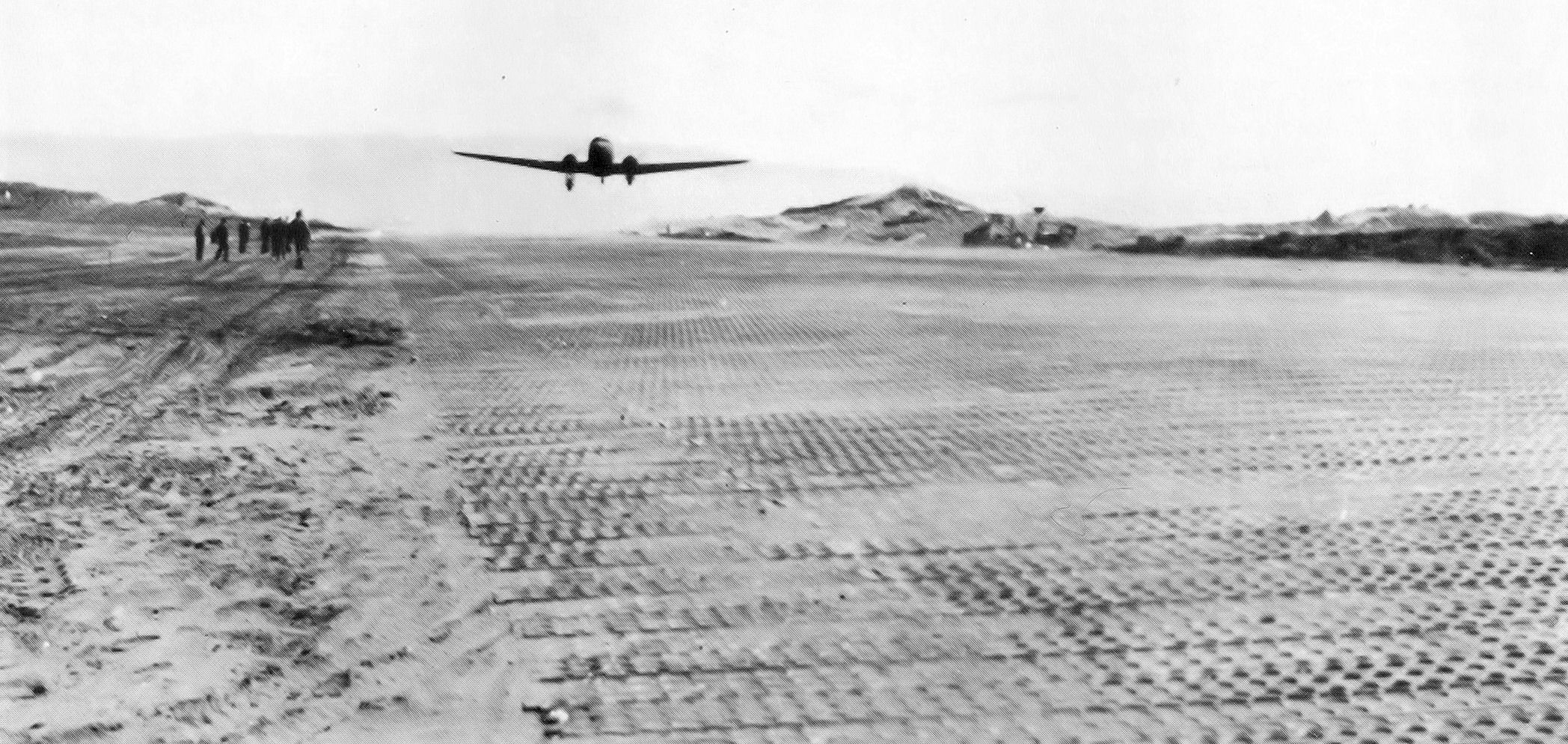
C-47 making the first landing on Shemya AAF in 1943

The squadron was first activated as 42d Transport Squadron at Elmendorf Field, Alaska in May 1942. The 42d transported personnel and supplies to the Aleutian Islands until February 1944.

As combat operations diminished, the squadron departed Alaska with the air echelon leaving on 11 February 1944 and the ground echelon following a week later. The squadron was reunited at Lawson Field, Georgia on 6 March to serve as a Replacement Training Unit (RTU). RTUs were oversized units which trained aircrews prior to their deployment to combat theaters. The squadron also began to participate in exercises with the parachute school at Fort Benning.

However, the Army Air Forces found that standard military units, based on relatively inflexible tables of organization, were proving less well adapted to the training mission. Accordingly, it adopted a more functional system in which each base was organized into a separate numbered unit, while the groups and squadrons acting as RTUs were disbanded or inactivated. As a result, one month after the squadron arrived in Georgia, in April 1944, it was disbanded and its personnel and equipment were transferred to the 811th AAF Base Unit (Parachute Flight Training).

=== Special Operations ===
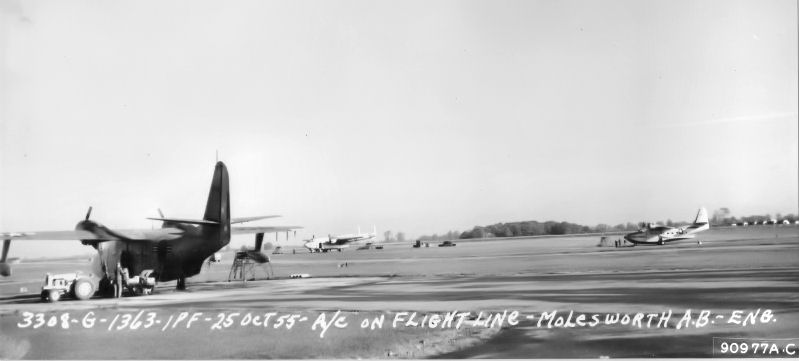
SA-16s at RAF Molesworth

The squadron was reactivated as 42d Troop Carrier Squadron, Medium, a "Special" troop carrier squadron at RAF Molesworth in fall 1956, when it absorbed the personnel, SA-16 and C-119 aircraft and special operations mission of the 582d Air Resupply Group. Equipped with C-119 Flying Boxcars for medium-lift insertions, SA-16 Albatross amphibians for low-level night and water-based extractions, later supplemented by C-54 Skymasters for extended-range transport, the squadron emphasized specialized tactics training. In the spring of 1957, as United States Air Forces in Europe (USAFE) was preparing to wind down operations at Molesworth, the squadron moved to RAF Alconbury, where it was inactivated in December. The squadron's Douglas C-54 Skymasters and Douglas C-47 Skytrains were sent to Rhein-Main Air Base West Germany, and its Fairchild C-119 Flying Boxcars were sent to the 322d Air Division at Evreux-Fauville Air Base France. The squadron was inactivated on 8 December 1957, as part of broader Cold War force structure adjustments.

=== Provisional AFRICOM Squadron ===
Reformed in 2007 as the 42nd Expeditionary Airlift Squadron and allotted to USAFE to activate as needed for AFRICOM operations. USAFE activated the squadron to conduct Lockheed C-130 Hercules airlift missions from 2008, supporting USAFE-AFAFRICA surge requirements to ensure mission readiness for time-sensitive United States Africa Command contingencies. These missions included transporting personnel and supplies to forward operating locations, delivering humanitarian aid, and providing intra-theater support integrated with deployed units from the 17th Air Force. Key efforts supported initiatives such as Operation Juniper Shield in northwestern Africa, enhancing USAFE's rapid response capabilities in the region. The unit was inactivated shortly thereafter in 2009 due to fulfillment of initial surge requirements.

== Lineage ==
- Constituted as the 42d Transport Squadron on 17 April 1942

Activated on 2 May 1942
Redesignated 42d Troop Carrier Squadron on 5 July 1942
Disbanded on 14 April 1944

- Reconstituted on 6 February 1956 and redesignated 42d Troop Carrier Squadron, Medium (Special)

Activated on 25 October 1956
Inactivated on 8 December 1957

- Redesignated 42nd Expeditionary Airlift Squadron on 6 November 2007 and allotted to United States Air Forces in Europe to activate or inactivate as needed

Activated on 1 October 2008
Inactivated on 15 June 2009

=== Assignments ===
- Eleventh Air Force: 2 May 1942 (attached to XI Air Force Service Command [Provisional]) after 21 June 1942)
- XI Air Force Service Command: 8 August 1942 (attached to 11th Air Force Troop Carrier Group [Provisional]) after 1 July 1943)
- 60th Troop Carrier Wing: 6 March 1944 – 14 April 1944
- Third Air Force: 25 October 1956 – 8 December 1957
- 404th Air Expeditionary Group: 1 October 2008 – 15 June 2009

=== Stations ===
- Elmendorf Field, Alaska, 2 May 1942
- Lawson Field, Georgia, 6 March 1944 – 14 April 1944
- RAF Molesworth, England, 25 October 1956
- RAF Alconbury, England, 31 May 1957 – 8 December 1957
- Ramstein Air Base, Germany 1 October 2008 – 15 June 2009

=== Aircraft ===
- Douglas C-47 Skytrain (1942–1944)
- Douglas C-53 Skytrooper (1944)
- Fairchild C-119 Flying Boxcar (1956–1957)
- Douglas C-54 Skymaster (1956–1957)
- Grumman SA-16 Albatross (1956–1957)
- Lockheed C-130 Hercules (2008–2009)

== See also ==
- List of United States Air Force airlift squadrons
- List of C-130 Hercules operators
