= 42nd Virginia Cavalry Battalion =

- Flag of Virginia, 1861
- Active: September 1863 – May 1864
- Disbanded: May 1864
- Country: Confederacy
- Allegiance: Confederate States of America
- Branch: Confederate States Army
- Type: Cavalry
- Engagements: American Civil War

The 42nd Virginia Cavalry Battalion was a cavalry battalion raised in Virginia for service in the Confederate States Army during the American Civil War. It fought mostly as part of the Army of Northern Virginia.

Virginia's 42nd Cavalry Battalion was organized in September, 1863, by consolidating the 32nd and 40th Battalions Virginia Cavalry. The unit contained eight companies and served in the Department of Richmond. During May, 1864, it contained 216 effectives and in June merged into the 24th Virginia Cavalry Regiment. Lieutenant Colonel William T. Robins and Major John R. Robertson were in command.

== See also ==
- List of Virginia Civil War units
