= 42 Squadron =

42 Squadron or 42nd Squadron may refer to:

- No. 42 Squadron RAAF, Australia
- No. 42 Squadron (Finland)
- No. 42 Squadron RNZAF, New Zealand
- No. 42 Squadron RAF, United Kingdom
- 42 Radar Squadron, Canada
- 42nd Air Refueling Squadron, United States Air Force
- 42nd Attack Squadron, United States Air Force
- 42nd Electronic Combat Squadron, United States Air Force
- 42nd Expeditionary Airlift Squadron, United States Air Force
- 42nd Flying Training Squadron, United States Air Force
- 42nd Tactical Missile Squadron, United States Air Force
- VA-42 (U.S. Navy), Attack Squadron 42
- Marine Aviation Logistics Squadron 42, United States Marine Corps

== See also ==
- 42nd Division (disambiguation)
- 42nd Group (disambiguation)
- 42nd Brigade (disambiguation)
- 42nd Regiment (disambiguation)
- 42nd Battalion (disambiguation)
