= 42nd Regiment =

42nd Regiment or Forty-second Regiment may refer to:

== Confederate States ==
- 42nd Arkansas Cavalry Regiment
- 42nd Mississippi Infantry Regiment
- 42nd Virginia Infantry Regiment

== United Kingdom ==
- 42nd Deoli Regiment, an infantry regiment of the British Indian Army
- 42 Engineer Regiment (Geographic), a unit of the British Army Royal Engineers
- 42nd Regiment of Foot, a unit of the British Army up to 1881, known as the "Black Watch"
- 42nd Royal Tank Regiment, a World War II armoured unit of the British Army

== United States ==
- 42nd Illinois Volunteer Infantry Regiment
- 42nd Indiana Infantry Regiment
- 42nd Infantry Regiment (United States), a unit of the US Army
- 42nd Kentucky Infantry Regiment
- 42nd New York Volunteer Infantry Regiment
- 42nd Ohio Infantry Regiment
- 42nd United States Colored Infantry Regiment
- 42nd Wisconsin Volunteer Infantry Regiment

== Other nations ==
- 42nd Armoured Regiment (India), a unit of the Union of the Indian Army
- 42nd Bomber Aviation Regiment, an aviation unit of the Yugoslav Air Force
- 42nd Field Artillery Regiment (Lanark and Renfrew Scottish), RCA, a unit of the Canadian Army
- 42nd Infantry Regiment (France), a former unit in the French Army
- 42nd Infantry Regiment (Poland), a unit of the Polish Armed Forces of the Second Polish Republic

== See also ==
- 42nd Battalion (disambiguation)
- 42nd Brigade (disambiguation)
- 42nd Division (disambiguation)
- 42nd Group (disambiguation)
- 42 Squadron (disambiguation)
