= 42nd Division =

42nd Division or 42nd Infantry Division may refer to:

== Infantry divisions ==
- 42nd Home Guard Infantry Division, Austro-Hungarian Army, World War I
- 42nd Division (German Empire), Imperial German Army
- 42nd Jäger Division, Germany
- 42nd Division (Imperial Japanese Army)
- 42nd Infantry Division (Russian Empire)
- 42nd Guards Motor Rifle Division, Soviet Union
- 42nd Rifle Division, Soviet Union
- 42nd Division (Spain)
- 42nd (East Lancashire) Infantry Division, British Army
- 42nd Infantry Division (United States), United States Army, New York Army National Guard
- 42nd Infantry Division Murska, Royal Yugoslav Army

== Armoured divisions ==
- 42nd Guards Tank Division, Soviet Union
- 42nd Armoured Division (United Kingdom), British Army

== Aviation divisions ==
- 42nd Air Division, United States Air Force
- 42nd Aviation Assault Division, Yugoslav Partisans

== Other divisions ==
- 42nd Rocket Division, Soviet Union

== See also ==
- List of military divisions by number
- 42nd Group (disambiguation)
- 42nd Brigade (disambiguation)
- 42nd Regiment (disambiguation)
- 42nd Battalion (disambiguation)
- 42nd Squadron (disambiguation)
