= 42nd Brigade =

42nd Brigade or 42nd Infantry Brigade may refer to:

== India ==
- 42nd Indian Brigade of the British Indian Army in the First World War

== Ukraine ==
- 42nd Mechanized Brigade (Ukraine)

== United Kingdom ==
- 42nd Anti-Aircraft Brigade (United Kingdom)
- 42nd Infantry Brigade (United Kingdom)
- 42nd Brigade Royal Field Artillery

== United States ==
- 42nd Combat Aviation Brigade
- 42nd Infantry Division Sustainment Brigade
- 42nd Military Police Brigade

== See also ==
- 42nd Division (disambiguation)
- 42nd Regiment (disambiguation)
- 42nd Squadron (disambiguation)
