= 581st Air Resupply and Communications Wing =

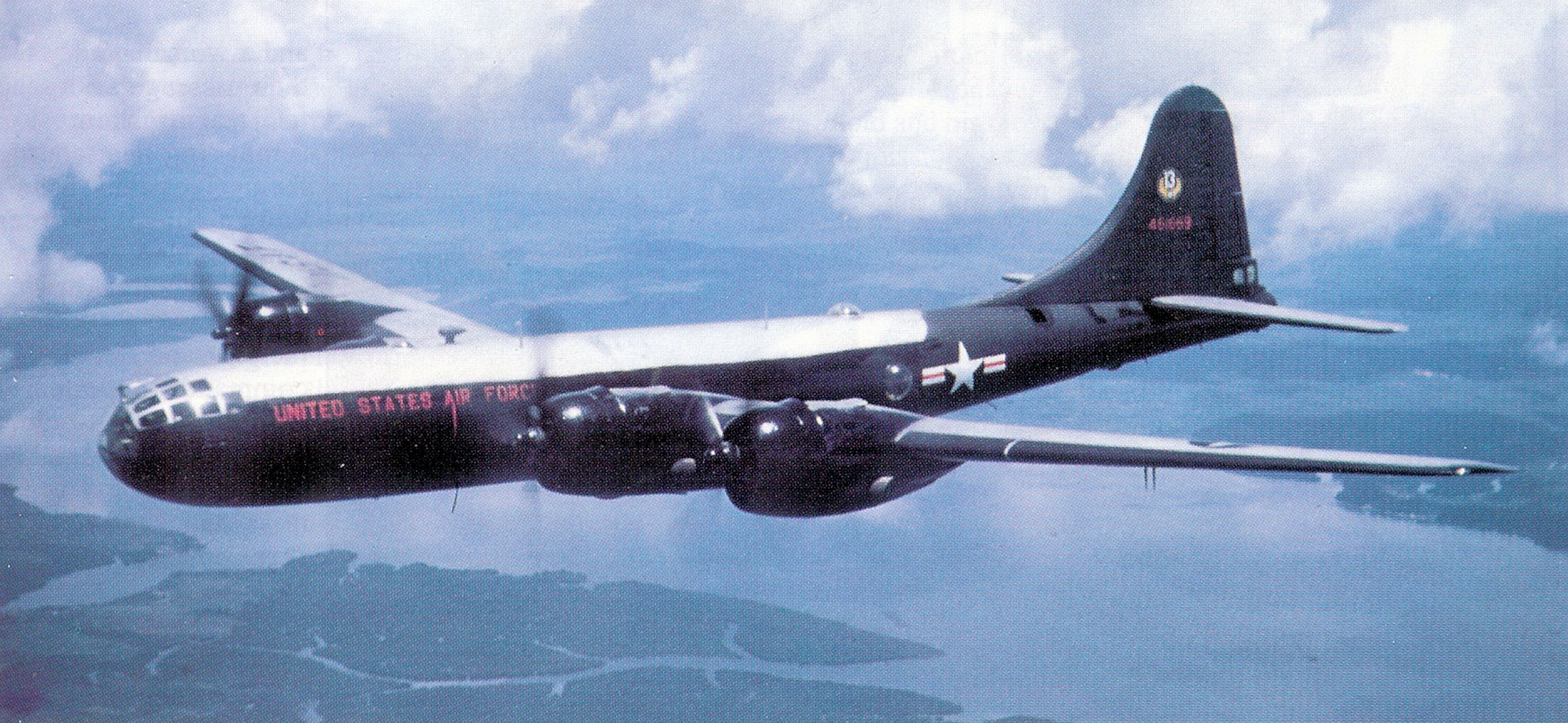
- 581st Wing B-29 Superfortress camouflaged for night operations (Note: The aircraft is Boeing B-29A-40-BN Superfortress, serial 44-61669. This plane flew combat missions from Guam during World War II with various nicknames. After the war, it served with Strategic Air Command until assigned to the 581st. It was modified as a TB-29A, then on 18 March 1956 transferred to the Naby for use as a target at China Lake Naval Air Weapons Station. In 1981, it was restored for display at the March Field Air Museum. Baugher, Joe (10 June 2023). "1944 USAF Serial Numbers". Joe Baugher.)
- Active: 1943–1944; 1951–1953
- Country: United States
- Branch: United States Air Force
- Role: Special Operations
- Motto: Libertas Per Veritatem (Latin for 'Liberty Through Truth')

Insignia
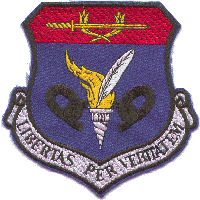
- Patch showing 581st Air Resupply and Communications Wing emblem (Note: Approved 12 June 1952. Description: On a shield azure, a torch, base argent, flame or, flame moving toward the dexter, over the flame a quill argent bend sinister, all between three links of a chain sable, the center link couped with one and one-half link on each side of the torch, on a chief gules two branches, of olive surmounted by a sword in fess, hilt and pommel to the dexter, all or.)

The 581st Air Resupply and Communications Wing was a United States Air Force special operations wing, last assigned to Thirteenth Air Force at Clark Air Base, Philippines, from 1951-53.

The wing was inactivated in 1953. In 1985, it was consolidated on paper with the 471st Bombardment Group, a World War II heavy bombardment replacement training unit, last assigned to the First Air Force at Westover Field, Massachusetts, and the two units together redesignated as the 471st Special Operations Wing. However, the new wing was not activated.

== History ==
=== World War II ===
The 471st Bombardment Group was activated at Alexandria Army Air Base, Louisiana in the spring of 1943 with the 805th, 806th, 807th, and 808th Bombardment Squadrons assigned. The group operated as a Consolidated B-24 Liberator replacement training unit. Replacement training units were oversized units which trained aircrews prior to their deployment to combat theaters. In January 1944, Second Air Force began to concentrate on Boeing B-29 Superfortress training. The 471st was reassigned to First Air Force and moved to Westover Field, Massachusetts. Training at Westover included long range overwater formation flights.

However, the Army Air Forces found that standard military units, based on relatively inflexible tables of organization were proving less well adapted to the training mission. Accordingly, a more functional system was adopted in which each base was organized into a separate numbered unit. This resulted in the 471st, along with other units at Westover, being disbanded in the spring of 1944 and being replaced by the 112th AAF Base Unit (Bombardment (Heavy)), which assumed the group's mission, personnel, and equipment.

=== Cold War ===
In 1951, the USAF created the 581st Air Resupply and Communications Wing at Mountain Home Air Force Base, Idaho. The wing consisted of an operational group assigned four units. The 581st Air Resupply & Communications Squadron (ARCS), the 581st Airborne Materials Assembly Squadron, the 581st Holding and Briefing Squadron, and the 581st Reproduction Squadron. The mission of the 581st ARS was the infiltration, resupply, and exfiltration of guerrilla-type personnel, and the aerial delivery of psychological warfare (PSYWAR) material (leaflets and other similar materials). The wing was also assigned two support groups a communications squadron and a maintenance squadron.

In early 1952, the 581st received orders to forward deploy to Clark AB, Philippines, and to be assigned to Thirteenth Air Force. The first air resupply and communications wing to deploy overseas, the composite wing arrived at Clark AB, stripped of its support groups and communications squadron, in July 1952. It retained four squadrons specifically tailored to perform the special operations mission and a maintenance squadron. Shortly before deploying, the 581st Air Resupply and Communications Group was reduced to a paper organization and its squadrons were attached to the wing. Of the five squadrons assigned or attached to the wing, the 581st ARCS was the lone squadron devoted to flying operations.

=== Korean War ===
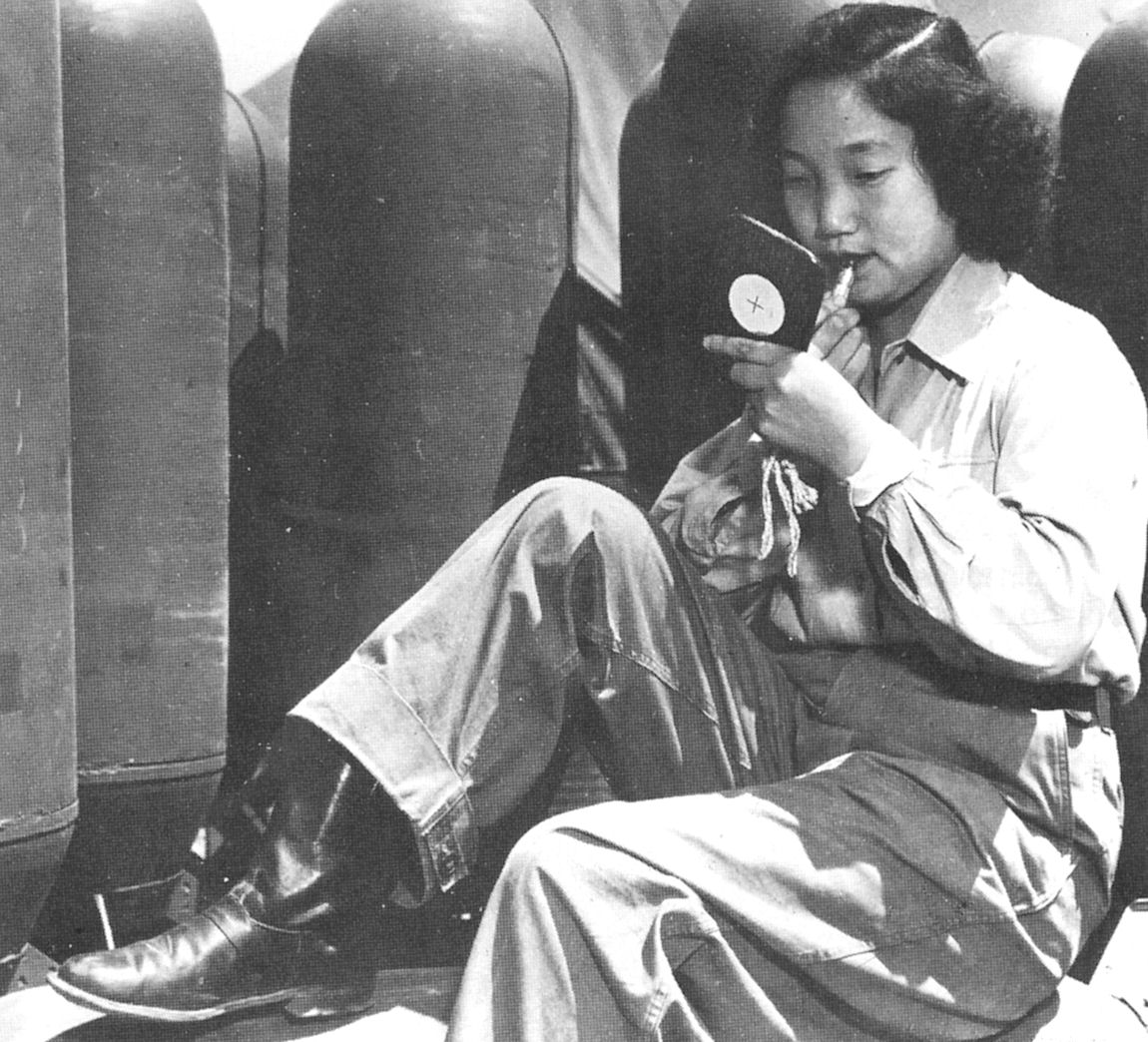
A female intelligence agent before a drop behind enemy lines

The 581st Wing proved to be flexible, and its initial theater deployment plan, outlined in Far East Command Operations Plan (OPLAN) 3–52, capitalized on this flexibility. The OPLAN established a concept of covert operations for theater forward deployment of assigned 581st ARCW assets. A key function of the wing was to maintain the capability to introduce special agents and guerrilla units into Communist countries and Communist-held areas, to supply them by and guerrilla units operating there, and to keep in contact with them by radio for the Central Intelligence Agency (CIA). The mission to introduce and extract special agents into Communist countries operated under the cover of psychological warfare, providing cover against inquiries into their clandestine purpose. Four of the wing's 12 B-29s, and associated support personnel were placed on a 60-day rotation schedule to Yokota Air Base, Japan, where they were co-located with the 91st Strategic Reconnaissance Squadron, which also flew the B-29. The wing's B-29s were retrofitted to allow cargo or human "drops" and were stripped of armament, with the exception of the tail gun, and countermeasures in order to lighten their load and increase altitude and range. One crew member was trained as a CIA contact, known as the jumpmaster. The identities of these jumpmasters were kept secret, even from the wing commander who did not know of their CIA connection. However, the wing had a senior officer serving as a liaison with the CIA. This was Lt. Colonel George Pittman, whose identity was also kept secret from those who did not have a need to know.

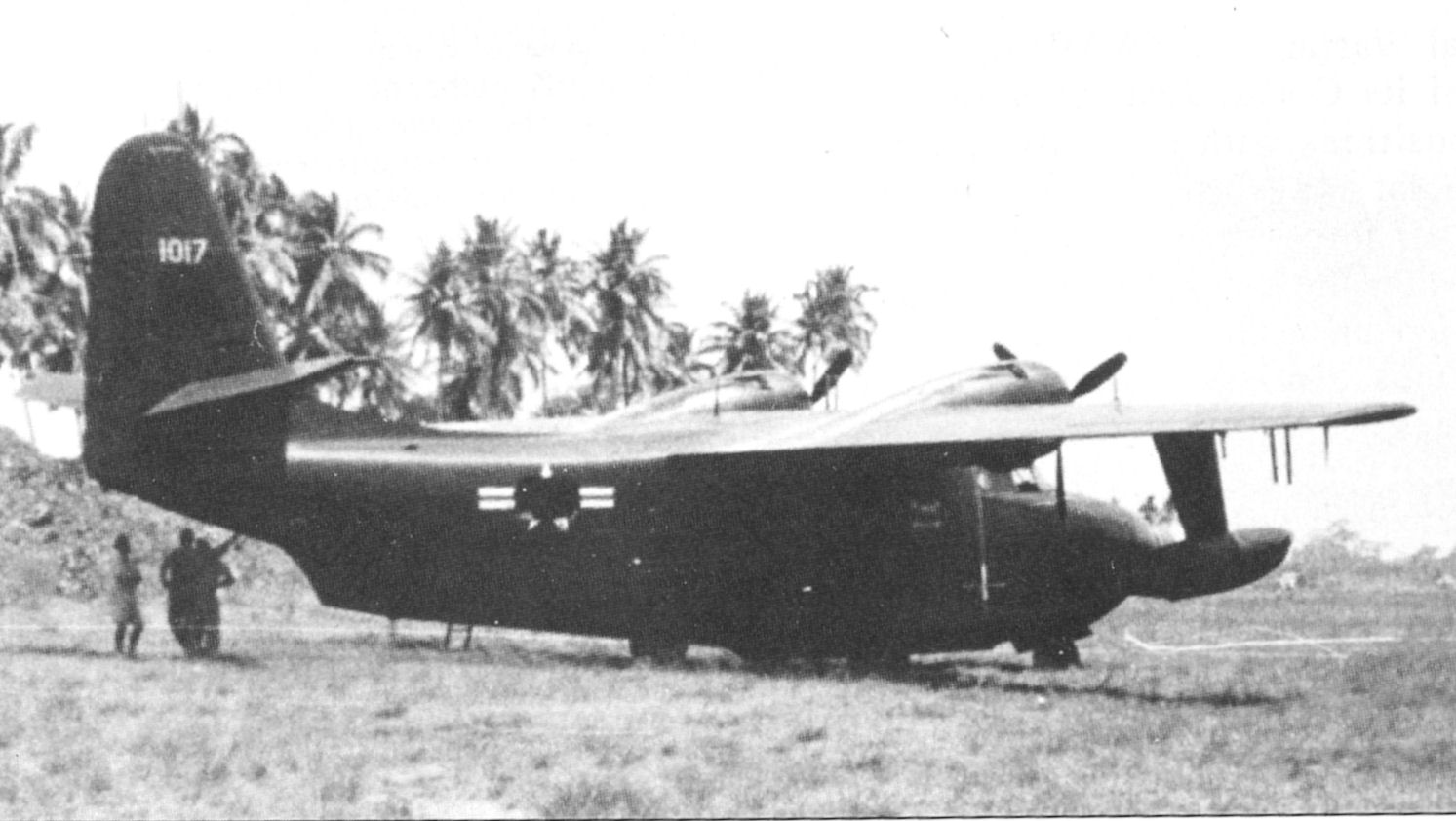
581st SA-16 in the Philippines (Note: Aircraft is Grumman SA-16A Albatross, serial 51-017. This plane was later transferred to the Navy as BuNo 149836. Baugher, Joe (19 July 2023). "1951 USAF Serial Numbers". Joe Baugher.)

The four Fairchild C-119 Flying Boxcar and support personnel were placed on a 90-day rotation schedule. The commander, 315th Air Division determined where the aircraft would be deployed. Two Grumman SA-16 Albatrosses were sent to K-16 (Seoul Airport) in South Korea to augment B Flight of the 6167th Air Base Group. The four Sikorsky H-19A "Chickasaw" helicopters were also deployed to K-16 to support the 2157th Air Rescue Squadron (in fact, they were co-located with the 2157th but actually supported B Flight, as did the two SA-16s). "34 CCRAK," (probably an entity associated with Combined Command Reconnaissance Activities, Korea) maintained Operational Control (OPCON) of these forces and employed them on incursions into North Korea, along with B Flight and Special Air Missions detachment aircraft. (Note: The Helicopter Flight and SA-16 Flight of the 581st Air Resupply Squadron received the Korean Service Steamer for their actions in Korea, but the rest of the wing did not.)

The wing's planes were painted solid black after their arrival at Clark AFB, and they flew long-range leaflet drop missions over North Korea. PSYWAR "leaflet bombs" were loaded with various forms of PSYWAR materiel and then airdropped from high altitude. An altitude-sensitive fuse opened the container at a predetermined set altitude, dependent on pre-mission forecast winds and desired dispersal patterns.

==== B-29 shootdown ====
One of the most sensational missions of the 581st in Korea occurred on 12 January 1953, when a 581st B-29 (tail number 44-62217, call sign "Stardust Four Zero") on its first leaflet drop mission with the Wing Commander, Colonel John K. Arnold Jr. (as well as the commander of the 91st Strategic Reconnaissance Wing, Major William (Bill) H. Baumer) on board, was shot down on their last leaflet target just south of the Yalu River in far northern Korea near the Chinese town of Antung. At the time, Russian fighter squadrons, some equipped for night flying, were providing the Chinese with airpower. Twelve Russian MiG-15s from the 351st (and perhaps the 535th) Fighter Air Regiments intercepted the lone Superfortress south of the Yalu River, about 15 miles (24 km) from the Chinese border. The MiGs were scrambled and vectored to the bomber's location by Russian radar-controlled searchlight units stationed near Antung. The searchlights illuminated the unarmed Superfortress and several MiGs engaged the bomber. Russian MiG pilot Senior Lieutenant Khabiev of the 351st Regiment was credited with the intercept and downing of the B-29.

According to Soviet sources:

"...Senior Lieutenant Khabiev was to distinguish himself once again: that night, the Commander of the 91st Strategic Reconnaissance Squadron – Major William Baumer – decided to take a look at the situation in North Korea for himself and joined the crew of an RB-29 that was about to set off on a so-called ‘paper flight’ to drop leaflets. This would appear to be an amusing mission for a strategic reconnaissance aircraft; a great deal of attention, however, was paid to psychological warfare – and the ‘flight’ that Baumer chose was a truly dangerous one. The Superfortress would need to ‘drop its bombs’ along the banks of the Yalu River in ‘MiG Alley’ itself.

At 22:21, the corps’ radar system detected an aircraft that, while it was over Yangdok, was heading for Uiju. Half an hour later (at 22:51), Senior Lieutenant Khabiev took off to intercept this aircraft. Khabiev was guided onto the tail of the bomber using the remote indicator screen on the ‘Periscope’ radar: ... Two minutes passed in the first impulse to find this bomber, and the pilot saw two intersecting searchlights ahead and to the left of him. He made a left-hand turn and noticed an RB-29 caught in the searchlights. Approaching the enemy aircraft’s aft hemisphere at an altitude of 7,000 m at 22:10 [23:10] Snr Lieutenant Khabiev closed to a distance of 600 m and positioned himself below and to the right of the aircraft, attacking at an aspect angle ranging from 0/4–1/4 and a climb angle of 5–10° with one long burst of fire aimed at the starboard engine, and the enemy aircraft caught fire. Despite the fact that he had reduced the engine rpm, Khabiev turned away to the right to avert a collision owing to the difference in speed, breaking off combat underneath and to the right of the enemy aircraft. He decided to attack the enemy aircraft a second time and began to assume an initial position from which to attack. He turned to the left and as he approached the burning aircraft’s tail from behind, he closed to a distance of 500–300 m, attacking once again at an aspect angle ranging from 0/4–1/4 with three long bursts of fire. The enemy aircraft, engulfed in flames, dived steeply towards the ground."

Although US sources believe the B-29 was flying in North Korean airspace at the time of its mayday call, a belief that is strongly disputed by the Chinese and Russian authorities, crew members who bailed out believe they landed in North Korean territory. Upon capture, the crew was rounded up, blindfolded and put aboard trucks, subsequently transported into China and later charged as CIA spies (the Chinese subsequently learned of the CIA connection with the air resupply units). During the highly publicized Chinese trial in Beijing in October 1954, the surviving crew members, along with captured CIA agents Richard Fecteau and John T. Downey, who were captured two years earlier after they had been shot down while attempting to pick up their Chinese agent, were given prison sentences ranging from 5 years to life. Not until 4 August 1955, two years after the Korean Armistice Agreement, were the surviving Stardust Four Zero crew members released from Chinese prison. These crew members were the longest-held POW USAF captives of the war.

=== First Indochina War ===
Beginning in 1953 the wing's C-119s began to be employed in Southeast Asia in support of French operations in Indochina. Supplies, including ammunition, vehicles, and barbed wire, were delivered to Haiphong Airport in ever increasing quantities. As this operation was underway, the wing was inactivated and its 581st Air Resupply Group, which received the wing's remaining assets, was transferred to control of Thirteenth Air Force.

== Lineage ==
471st Bombardment Group

- Constituted as the 471st Bombardment Group (Heavy) on 22 April 1943

Activated on 1 May 1943
Disbanded on 10 April 1944

- Reconstituted on 31 July 1985 and consolidated with the 581st Air Resupply and Communications Wing as the 471st Special Operations Wing

581st Air Resupply and Communications Wing

- Constituted as the 581st Air Resupply and Communications Wing on 9 July 1951

Activated on 23 July 1951
Inactivated on 8 September 1953.

- Consolidated on 31 July 1985 with the 471st Bombardment Group as the 471st Special Operations Wing (remained inactive)

=== Components ===
Groups

- 581st Air Base Group: 23 July 1951 – 26 June 1952
- 581st Air Resupply and Communications Group, 23 July 1951 – 8 September 1953 (not operational after 17 April 1952)
- 581st Medical Group: 23 July 1951 – 26 June 1952

Squadrons

- 581st Air Resupply and Communications Squadron, (attached 17 April 1952 – 8 September 1953)
- 581st Airborne Materials Assembly Squadron, (attached 17 April 1952 – 8 September 1953)
- 581st Holding and Briefing Squadron, (attached 17 April 1952 – 8 September 1953)
- 581st Reproduction Squadron, (attached 17 April 1952 – 8 September 1953)
- 804th Bombardment Squadron: 1 May 1943 – 10 April 1944
- 805th Bombardment Squadron: 1 May 1943 – 10 April 1944
- 806th Bombardment Squadron: 1 May 1943 – 10 April 1944
- 807th Bombardment Squadron: 1 May 1943 – 10 April 1944
- 581st Communications Squadron: 23 July 1951 – 26 June 1952
- 581st Maintenance Squadron: 23 July 1951 – 8 September 1953

=== Assignments ===
- II Bomber Command, 1 May 1943
- I Bomber Command, 28 January-10 April 1944
- Air Resupply And Communications Service, 23 July 1951
- Thirteenth Air Force, 12 July 1952 – 8 September 1953

=== Stations ===
- Alexandria Army Air Base, Louisiana, 1 May 1943
- Pueblo Army Air Base, Colorado, 7 May 1943
- Westover Field, Massachusetts, 28 January 1944 – 10 April 1944
- Mountain Home AFB, Idaho, 23 July 1951 – 18 July 1952
- Clark Air Base, Philippines, 18 July 1952 – 8 September 1953
- Kadena Air Base, Okinawa, 8 September 1953 – 1 September 1956

=== Aircraft ===
- Consolidated B-24 Liberator, 1943–1944
- Fairchild C-119 Flying Boxcar 1951–1956
- Boeing B-29 Superfortress 1951–1956
- Grumman SA-16 Albatross 1951–1956
- Sikorsky H-19 1952–1956
- Douglas C-54 Skymaster 1956
- C-118 1952–1956

== See also ==
- Air Force Special Operations Command
- 313th Air Division
