= 322 Squadron =

322 Squadron may refer to:

- No. 322 (Dutch) Squadron RAF (1943–1945)
- No. 322 Squadron RNLAF, since 1945
- 322d Bombardment Squadron, United States
- 322d Expeditionary Reconnaissance Squadron, United States
- 322d Figher Squadron, later 322d Fighter-Interceptor Squadron, United States
- 322d Strategic Reconnaissance Squadron, United States
- 322d Troop Carrier Squadron, United States
- INAS 322, Indian Navy
- VMA-322, United States Marine Corps

== See also ==
- 322d (disambiguation)
