= 322d Troop Carrier Squadron =

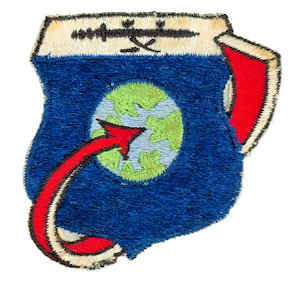
- Emblem of the 322d Troop Carrier Squadron
- Active: 1944–1957
- Country: United States
- Branch: United States Army Air Forces

The 322d Troop Carrier Squadron is an inactive United States Air Force unit. Its last assignment was with the Fifth Air Force, being inactivated at Kadena Air Base, Okinawa on 8 December 1957.

The squadron was originally activated by the Fourteenth Air Force at Kunming Airport, China to provide air transportation in that country. At the end of the war, it airlifted Chinese troops to bases in eastern China for disarmament operations. The squadron was reactivated on Okinawa in the 1950s as a special operations unit, replacing the 581st Air Resupply Group.

== History ==
=== Lineage ===
- Constituted as the 322d Troop Carrier Squadron on 25 August 1944

Activated on 9 September 1944
Inactivated on 6 January 1946

- Redesignated the 322d Troop Carrier Squadron, Medium (Special) on 18 July 1956

Activated on 18 September 1956
Inactivated on 8 December 1957

=== Assignments ===
- Fourteenth Air Force, 9 September 1944
- Tenth Air Force, 25 August 1945 – 6 January 1946

Attached to 443d Troop Carrier Group, 4 September – 1 December 1945

- 313th Air Division, 18 September 1956
- Fifth Air Force, 12 February – 8 December 1957.

=== Stations ===
- Kunming Airport, China, 9 September 1944
- Loping Airfield, China, 25 May 1945
- Liangshan Airfield, China, 1 August 1945
- Chihkiang Airfield, China, 25 August 1945
- Hankow Airfield, China, 3 October-i December 1945
- Fort Lawton, Washington, 4–6 January 1946
- Kadena Air Base, Okinawa, 18 September 1956 – 8 December 1957.

=== Aircraft ===
- C-47 Skytrain, 1944–1945
- C-46 Commando, 1945
- C-54 Skymaster, 1956–1957
- SA-16 Albatross, 1956–1957
- C-119 Flying Boxcar, 1956–1957
