= 322nd Regiment =

322nd Regiment may refer to:

- 322nd Cavalry Regiment, United States
- 332nd Infantry Regiment, United States
- 332nd Engineer General Service Regiment, United States
- 322nd Signal Regiment, Yugoslavia
