= Marine Wing Liaison Kadena =

United States Marine Corps unit in Japan

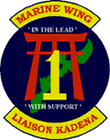
- MWLK Insignia
- Country: United States
- Allegiance: United States of America
- Branch: United States Marine Corps
- Type: Logistics
- Part of: 1st Marine Aircraft Wing; III Marine Expeditionary Force
- Garrison/HQ: Kadena Air Base
- Motto: "In the Lead with Support"

Commanders
- Current commander: LtCol Matthew “VĀJ” Sisneros

Marine Wing Liaison Kadena (MWLK) is a United States Marine Corps logistics and liaison unit based at Kadena Air Base on Okinawa, Japan. They fall under 1st Marine Aircraft Wing and III Marine Expeditionary Force

== Mission ==
Marine Wing Liaison Kadena provides comprehensive operational and logistical support to local and deployed U.S. Marine Corps and United States Navy squadrons operating at Kadena Air Base (KAB) Okinawa, Japan, and facilitates essential liaison with the United States Air Force's 18th Wing and the U.S. Navy's Commander Fleet Activities Okinawa (CFAO), which are located aboard KAB.

== See also ==
- United States Marine Corps Aviation
- List of United States Marine Corps aviation support squadrons
