= 733rd Air Mobility Squadron =

- Country: United States
- Branch: Air
- Size: Squadron
- Garrison/HQ: Kadena Air Base

The 733rd Air Mobility Squadron (733 AMS) is an air mobility squadron of the United States Air Force based at Kadena Air Base in Japan. It is part of the 515th Air Mobility Operations Group, based at Yokota Air Base, Japan and the 515th Air Mobility Operations Wing, based at Hickam Air Force Base, Hawaii.Originally constituted as the 603rd Military Airlift Support Squadron (MASS) and activated on 27 Dec 1965, then organized and manned at Kadena Air Base on the Japanese Island of Okinawa. In January 1986 the 603rd MASS was inactivated and consolidated with 603rd Military Airlift Support Group (MASG). The unit continued to function as a Group until July 1994, but in 1992 was redesignated the 603d Airlift Support Group. With the establishment of Air Mobility Command the unit returned to its Squadron designation in July 1994 as the 633d Air Mobility Support Squadron (AMSS), and in March 2001 redesignated 733rd Air Mobility Squadron (AMS).
