= 1st Battalion, 1st Air Defense Artillery Regiment =

US army unit

1st Air Defense Artillery
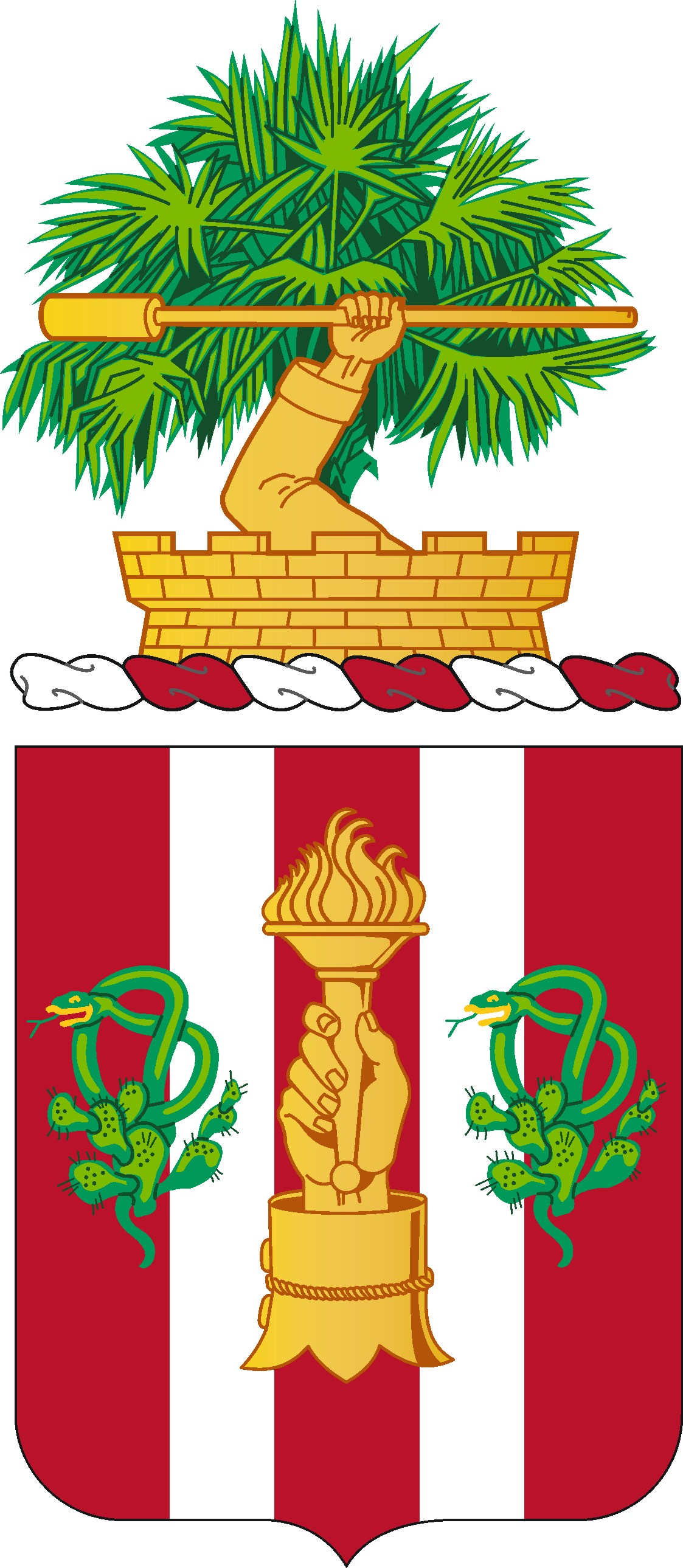
- 1st Air Defense Artillery coat of arms
- Active: 1790s–present
- Country: USA
- Branch: Army
- Type: Air Defense Artillery
- Size: Battalion
- Part of: 38th Air Defense Artillery Brigade
- Garrison/HQ: Kadena Air Base
- Motto: PRIMUS INTER PARES (First among equals)

Insignia
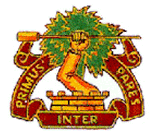
- Distinctive unit insignia

The 1st Battalion, 1st Air Defense Artillery Regiment was organized in the 1790s as a company in the 2nd Regiment of Artillerists and Engineers. From there, the battalion was called upon to serve in multiple conflicts including the War of 1812, Indian Wars, Mexican–American War, World War II, and modern conflicts in the Middle East.

From February 2003 to May 2003, the battalion served in support of Operation Iraqi Freedom. Alpha and Bravo batteries deployed to provide air defense for the Kingdom of Bahrain, while the balance of the battalion deployed to Kuwait in support of operation there.

In February 2006, the battalion was deployed on a contingency operation to Kadena Air Base, Okinawa, Japan, to provide air defense for key assets in the Pacific region; the battalion arrived in November of that same year. The battalion is currently assigned to the 38th Air Defense Artillery Brigade, and is charged with providing air and missile defense in support of the INDOPACOM commander.

== Campaign participation credit ==
War of 1812

- Canada

Indian Wars

- Seminoles
- Texas 1859

Mexican War

- Palo Alto
- Resaca de la Palma
- Monterey
- Vera Cruz
- Cerro Gordo
- Contreras
- Churubusco
- Chapultepec
- Tamaulipas 1846
- Vera Cruz 1847
- Mexico 1847

Civil War

- Sumter
- Bull Run
- Mississippi River
- Peninsula
- Manassas
- Antietam
- Fredericksburg
- Chancellorsville
- Gettysburg
- Wilderness
- Spotsylvania
- Cold Harbor
- Petersburg
- Shenandoah
- Appomattox
- Florida 1861
- Florida 1862
- Florida 1864
- South Carolina 1862
- South Carolina 1863
- Virginia 1863
- Virginia 1864
- West Virginia 1863
- Louisiana 1864

World War II

- American Theater, Streamer without inscription
- Tunisia
- Sicily
- Rome-Arno
- Rhineland

Southwest Asia

- Defense of Saudi Arabia
- Liberation and Defense of Kuwait
- Cease-Fire
- Operation Iraqi Freedom 2003

== Decorations ==
1-1 ADA has received the following unit award(s):

- Meritorious Unit Award (2003)

== See also ==
- 2nd Air Defense Artillery Regiment (United States)
