= 322d =

322d or 322nd may refer to:

- 322d Air Expeditionary Group, a provisional United States Air Force unit assigned to the United States Air Forces in Europe
- 322nd Division (disambiguation), several units
- 332nd Medical Brigade, a United States Army Reserve unit
- 322nd Regiment (disambiguation), several units
- 322d Squadron (disambiguation), several units

== See also ==
- 322 (number)
- 322, the year 322 (CCCXXII) of the Julian calendar
