= 6167th Air Base Group =

- Active: 1950–1953
- Country: United States
- Branch: United States Air Force
- Role: Psychological Warfare

The 6167th Air Base Group is an inactive United States Air Force unit. Its last duty assignment was at K-16 (Seoul Airport), South Korea during the Korean War.

== History ==
Formed from the 6167th Air Base Unit in October 1950 to operate flare aircraft, psychological operations, and behind-the-lines agent insertions and resupply drops during the war. Its designation served as a cover for its actual special operations activities

Its 6167th Operations Squadron was augmented by aircrews from the Clark AB, Philippines-based 581st Air Resupply and Communications Wing (581st ARCW), a cover designation for a special operations unit. Aircraft operated were the B-26 Invader, C-46 Commando, and C-47s.

Two SA-16 Albatrosses were sent to K-16 (Seoul Airport) in South Korea by the 581st ARCW to augment B Flight of the 6167th Air Base Group. In addition, four Sikorsky H-19A helicopters were also forward deployed to K-16 in support of the 2157th Air Rescue Squadron (in fact, they were colocated with the 2157th but actually supported B Flight, as did the two SA-16s).

Combined Command Reconnaissance Activities, Korea (CCRAK) maintained Operational Control of these forces and employed them into North Korea along with B Flight and Special Air Missions detachment aircraft.

The 6167th Operations Squadron operated C-47s and B-26s, equipped for both leaflet drops and psychological warfare voice missions. In 1952–1953, almost all flying operations were nighttime missions and included occasional drops of very young teenaged Korean nationals whose parents were well paid to allow their children to parachute into North Korea. Their assignments were to visually obtain strategic intelligence on production facilities, transportation, troop placement, and other specifics. They were to walk back to the battle lines and, using passwords, pass through to deliver the intelligence gathered to the proper US military authorities.

The 6167th Air Base Group was redesignated the 6167th Air Base Squadron and activated at Kimpo Air Base (K-14) near Seoul ROK. The unit was discontinued when Kimpo Air Base closed in the 1970s. The old air base is now part of Kimpo (sometimes translated as Gimpo) International Airport, Gangseo District, Seoul, South Korea.

== See also ==
- Air Force Special Operations Command
