= 313th Air Division =

- Active: 1944–1948; 1955–1991
- Country: United States
- Branch: United States Air Force
- Role: Command of tactical forces
- Engagements: Pacific Theater of Operations
- Decorations: Air Force Outstanding Unit Award

Insignia
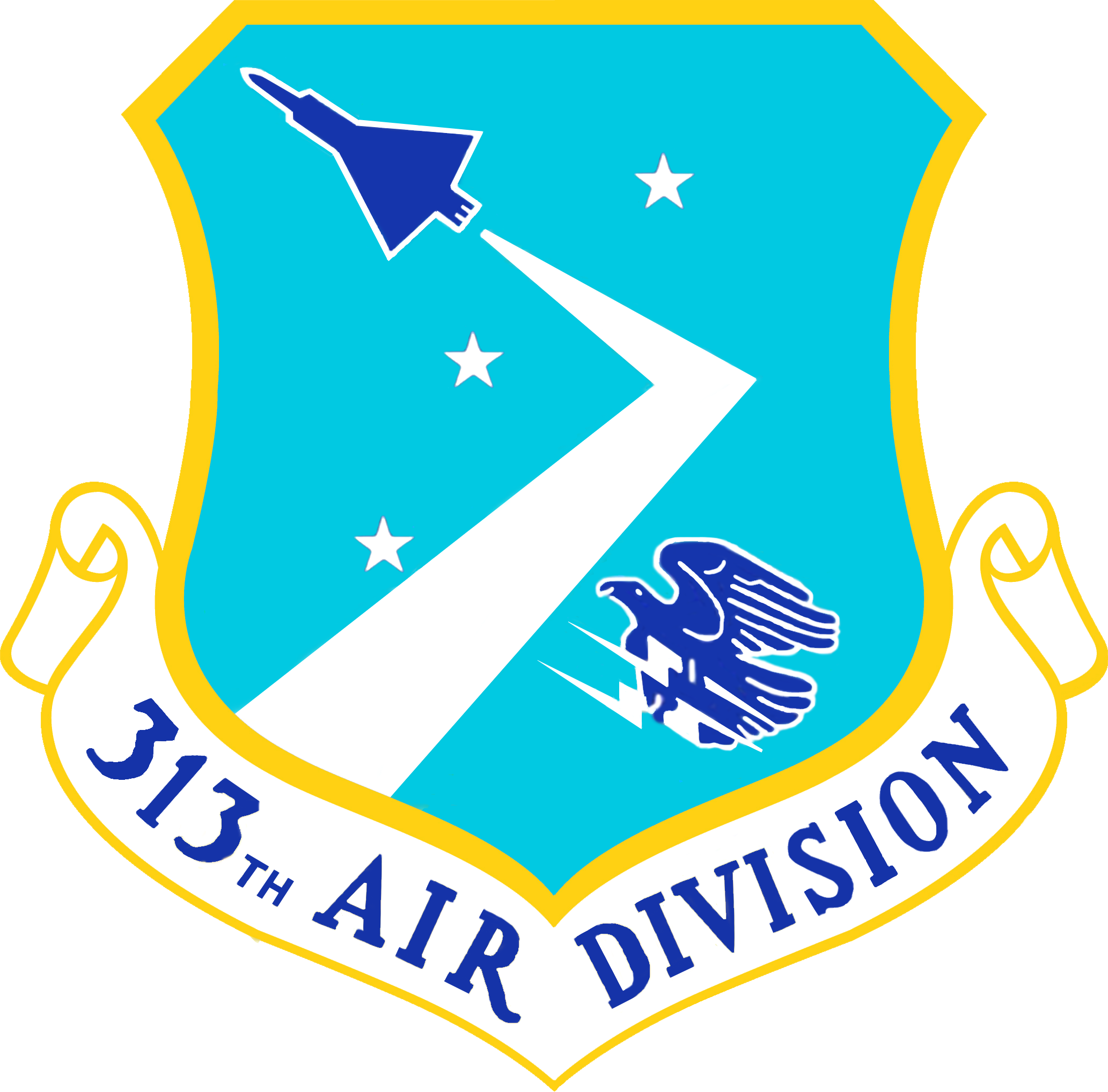
- 313th Air Division emblem (Note: Approved 15 July 1957. Description: On a shield azure, a silhouetted futuramic aircraft, volant in dexter chief, Air Force blue, fimbriated argent, with vapor trail forming an acute angular pattern from the aircraft to dexter base, the trail between three stars arched in bend sinister, one to chief, two to dexter of trail, all of the third, in sinister base an eagle volant of the second [color mentioned], fimbriated and detailed argent, grasping with his talons two bolts of lightning of the last [color mentioned].)

The 313th Air Division is an inactive United States Air Force unit. It was initially organized in 1944 during World War II for use in the Pacific Theater of Operations. Its last assignment was with Pacific Air Forces at Kadena Air Base, Okinawa. It was inactivated on 1 October 1991.

== History ==
The unit was first organized during World War II as the 313th Bombardment Wing, part of Twentieth Air Force. The 313th Wing engaged in very heavy bombardment Boeing B-29 Superfortress operations against Japan.

=== World War II ===
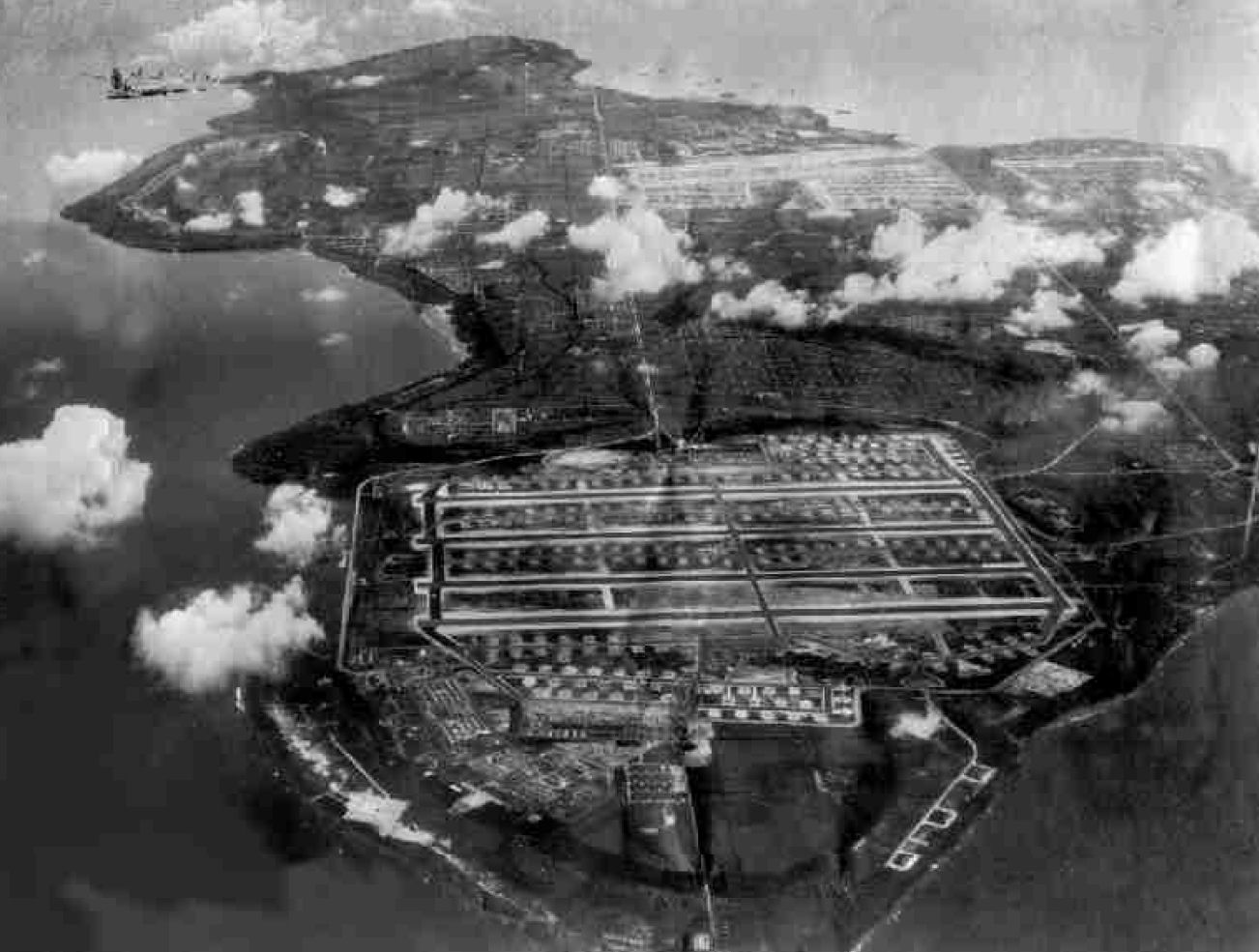
Tinian, Mariana Islands, 1945 (Note: Taken after airfield construction, looking north to south. The massive North Field was home of the 313th Bombardment Wing and is in foreground. The 313th Wing consisted of 4 B-29 Superfortress Bombardment Groups, later adding the 509th Composite Group, which conducted the Atomic Bomb Attacks against Japan in August 1945.)

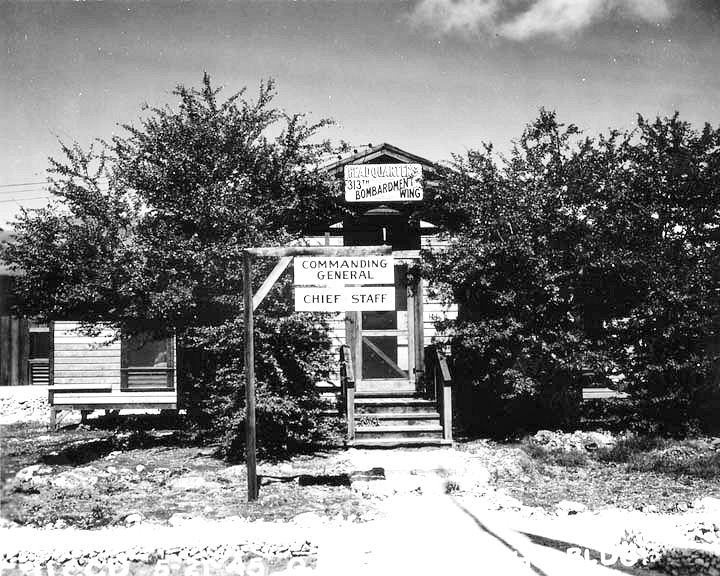
313th Bombardment Wing HQ Tinian, Mariana Islands, 1945

The 313th Bombardment Wing was organized at Peterson Field, Colorado in the spring of 1944 as a very heavy bombardment wing, to be equipped with Boeing B-29 Superfortresses. Operational groups assigned to the wing were the 6th and 9th Bombardment Groups. Both were existing units with the 6th being reassigned from the Sixth Air Force in the Caribbean, where it was performing antisubmarine missions and protecting the Panama Canal from airfields in Panama. The 9th was assigned to Army Air Forces Training Command in Florida as part of its school of applied tactics. Both groups were reassigned to bases in Nebraska – to (Grand Island Army Air Field and McCook Army Air Field) respectively, where they trained initially on Boeing B-17 Flying Fortresses until their B-29 aircraft could be manufactured and made available to them. Two other bombardment groups, the 504th and 505th were formed as new units (504th at Fairmont Army Air Field, the 505th at Harvard Army Air Field), also being assigned to bases in Nebraska for training. After dealing with various training issues and also problems with the B-29s they received, the combat groups were ready to deploy to the Pacific Theater and departed for North Field, on the Tinian, arriving during late December 1944.

On Tinian, the wing was assigned to the XXI Bomber Command of Twentieth Air Force. Once in place, the groups of the 313th "began flying missions, initially against Iwo Jima, the Truk Islands, and other Japanese held areas. Later, they flew low-level night incendiary raids on area targets in Japan; participated in mining operations in the Shimonoseki Strait, and contributed to the blockade of the Japanese Empire by mining harbors in Japan and Korea. In April 1945 the 313th assisted the invasion of Okinawa by bombing Japanese airfields used by kamikaze pilots."

A fifth group, the 509th Composite Group, was assigned to the wing in May 1945 from Wendover Army Air Field, Utah. The 509th, although assigned to the 313th Wing, was operationally controlled by Headquarters, Twentieth Air Force. The 509th was given a base area near the airfield on the north tip of Tinian, several miles from the main installations in the center part of the island where the other groups were assigned. Also unlike the other groups in the wing, the 509th used a wide variety of tail codes from various XXI bomber Command groups, instead of using its own, so that the group's planes could not be identified by the Japanese. The 509th was also self-contained, and drew little in resources from the 313th Wing or its other groups.

In early August, the mission of the 509th was revealed when the group flew Atomic bombings of Hiroshima and Nagasaki. In November, the 509th was relieved from assignment to the 313th Bomb Wing and moved to Roswell Army Air Field, New Mexico.

"After the Japanese surrender in August, 313th Wing units dropped food and supplies to Allied prisoners and participated in show-of-force flights over Japan." As part of the postwar drawdown of forces, two of the Wing's groups, the 504th and 505th were inactivated in late 1945 and early 1946.

Another group, the 383d Bombardment Group, was reassigned to the 313th Bombardment Wing from Eighth Air Force in September 1945 after the Eighth was drawn down on Okinawa. The Eighth Air Force was planned to be a second strategic Air Force to be used during the Operation Downfall, the invasion of Japan, which never materialized. The 383d was inactivated in December with its aircraft and personnel returning to the United States.

=== Pacific Air Forces ===
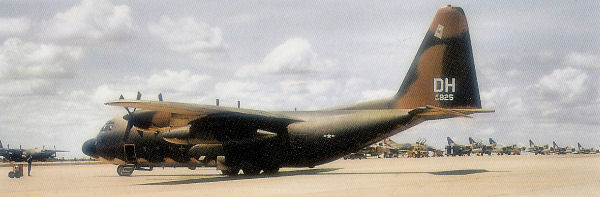
C-130 Hercules of the 345th Tactical Airlift Squadron at Ching Chuan Kang Air Base (Note: Aircraft is Lockheed C-130E-LM Hercules, serial 63-7825. Transferred to the Aerospace Maintenance and Regeneration Center on 6 August 2009. Baugher, Joe (26 July 2023). "1963 USAF Serial Numbers". Joe Baugher. Photo taken in 1970.)

In March 1946, the 313th was reassigned to Thirteenth Air Force in the Philippines. In the Philippines, the wing was assigned the 5th Bombardment Group from Seventh Air Force "where it conducted bombardment training, aerial reconnaissance and mapping and construction projects." The 5th Reconnaissance Group conducted many clandestine mapping missions over non-friendly areas of Asia during the postwar era. The wing itself began phasing down for inactivation in late 1947, with the 6th and 9th bomb groups being inactivated in June 1947, and finally the 5th Group in January 1948. The 313th Bombardment Wing was itself inactivated in June 1948.

In March 1955, the organization was redesignated as the 313th Air Division as part of Far East Air Forces' Fifth Air Force, at Kadena Air Base, Okinawa. The mission of the 313th was the command of USAF units stationed on Okinawa.

Throughout the years of the Cold War, the 313th assumed "responsibility for air defense of the Ryukyu Islands and tactical operations in the Far East, maintaining assigned forces at the highest possible degree of combat readiness. In addition, it supported Fifth Air Force in the development, planning, and coordination of requirements for future Air Force operations in the Ryukyu Islands. The division also supported numerous Pacific Air Forces exercises such as Cope Thunder, Cope Diamond, Team Spirit, and Cope North"

The 313th was inactivated on 1 October 1991 as part of a general drawdown of USAF forces in the Pacific after the end of the Cold War.

== Lineage ==
- Established as the 313th Bombardment Wing, Very Heavy on 15 April 1944

Activated on 23 April 1944
Inactivated on 15 June 1948

- Redesignated 313th Air Division on 3 January 1955

Activated on 1 March 1955
Inactivated on 1 October 1991

=== Assignments ===
- Second Air Force, 23 April – 8 June 1944
- XXI Bomber Command, 8 June 1944 – 16 July 1945
- Twentieth Air Force, 16 July 1945 – 13 March 1946
- Thirteenth Air Force, 13 March 1946 – 15 June 1948
- Fifth Air Force, 1 March 1955 – 1 October 1991

=== Units assigned ===
==== World War II ====
- 6th Bombardment Group: 28 December 1944 – 1 June 1947
- 9th Bombardment Group: 28 December 1944 – 9 June 1947
- 72d Air Service Group: 28 December 1944 – 1 June 1947
- 77th Air Service Group: 28 December 1944 – 9 June 1947
- 358th Air Service Group: 23 December 1944 – 15 June 1946
- 359th Air Service Group: 23 December – 30 June 1946
- 383d Bombardment Group: 12 September – 19 December 1945
- 390th Air Service Group: 29 May – c. 17 October 1945
- 504th Bombardment Group: 23 December 1944 – 15 June 1946
- 505th Bombardment Group: 23 December – 30 June 1946
- 509th Composite Group: 29 May – c. 17 October 1945 (attached to Twentieth Air Force)

==== United States Air Force ====
Wings

- 18th Fighter-Bomber Wing (later, 18th Tactical Fighter Wing): attached 1 March 1955 – 1 February 1957, assigned 10 November 1958 – 1 October 1991
- 51st Fighter-Interceptor Wing: 1 March 1955 – 31 May 1971
- 374th Tactical Airlift Wing: 1 November 1968 – 31 May 1971

Groups

- 5th Bombardment Group (later, 5th Reconnaissance Group): 10 June 1946 – 5 February 1947; 15 March 1947 – 10 January 1948
- 581st Air Resupply Group: March 1955 – 1 September 1956
- 1962d Communications Group: 1 Oct 90 – 1 Oct 91

Squadrons

- 5th Reconnaissance Squadron: 15 June 1946 – 3 February 1947
- 24th Combat Mapping Squadron: 1 April – 15 June 1946.
- 38th Reconnaissance Squadron: 15 March – 20 April 1947
- 322d Troop Carrier Squadron: 18 September 1956 – 12 February 1957
- 623rd Aircraft Control & Warning Squadron: 15 March 1955 – 17 July 1960

=== Stations ===
- Peterson Field, Colorado, 23 April – 5 November 1944
- North Field, Tinian, Mariana Islands, 24 December 1944 – 17 February 1946
- Clark Field (later Clark Air Base), Luzon, Philippines, 17 February 1946 – 15 June 1948
- Kadena Air Base, Okinawa, 1 March 1955 – 1 October 1991

== See also ==
- List of United States Air Force air divisions
