= 581st Air Resupply Group =

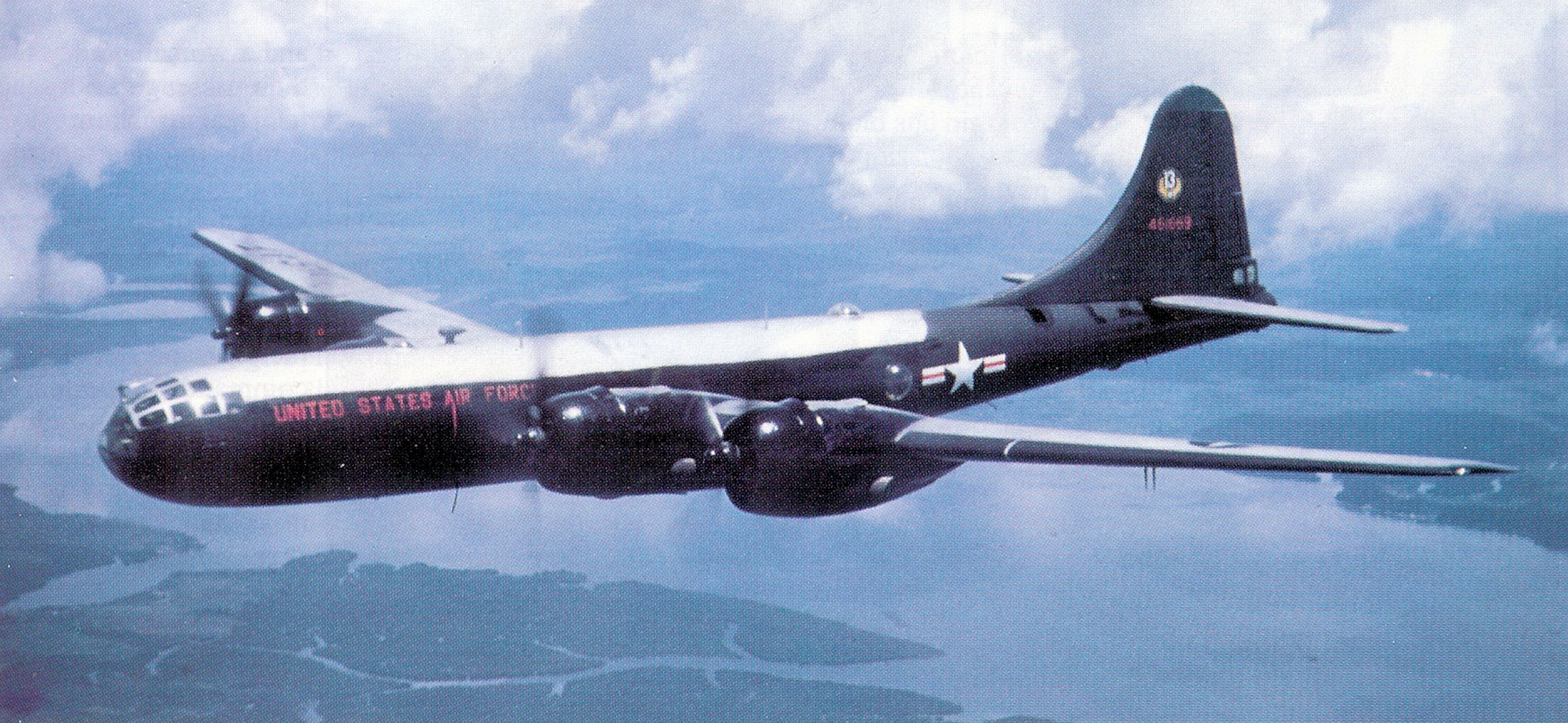
- Group B-29 Superfortress (Note: Aircraft is Boeing B-29A-40-BN Superfortress, serial 44-61669.)
- Active: 1951–1956
- Country: United States
- Branch: United States Air Force
- Role: Special operations
- Motto(s): Libertas per Veritatem (Latin for 'Liberty Through Truth')
- Engagements: Korean War

Insignia
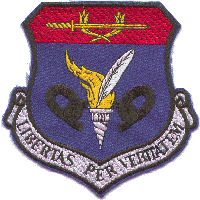
- Patch displaying the group emblem (Note: Approved 12 June 1952 for the 581st Wing.)

The 581st Air Resupply Group is an inactive United States Air Force group. Its last duty assignment was at Kadena Air Base, Okinawa, where it was inactivated in 1956.

== History ==
for additional related history see 471st Special Operations Wing

In 1951, the USAF created the 581st Air Resupply and Communications Wing, whose operational component was the 581st Air Resupply and Communications Group at Mountain Home Air Force Base, Idaho. The group consisted of four squadrons. The 581st Air Resupply and Communications Squadron (later Air Resupply Squadron) (ARS), the 581st Airborne Materials Assembly Squadron, the 581st Holding and Briefing Squadron, and the 581st Reproduction Squadron. The mission of the 581st ARS was the infiltration, resupply, and exfiltration of guerrilla-type personnel, and the aerial delivery of psychological warfare (PSYWAR) materiel (leaflets and other similar materials). Of the four squadrons assigned to the group, the 581st Air Resupply Squadron (ARS) was the lone squadron devoted to flying operations.

In the summer of 1952 the wing and group relocated to Clark Air Base in the Philippines, where it was assigned to Thirteenth Air Force.

=== Korean War ===
Shortly before deployment to Clark, the group was reduced to paper status and its squadrons were attached directly to wing headquarters. This arrangement continued until the wing was inactivated in September 1953 and the 581st Holding and Briefing Squadron and the 581st Reproduction Squadron were inactivated. The group was redesignated the 581st Air Resupply Group and gained a maintenance squadron. For all practical purposes, the wing headquarters became the group headquarters. For a more detailed description of the group's operations during this period, see 581st Air Resupply and Communications Wing.

=== First Indochina War ===
At the direction of the 315th Air Division commander, the 581st C-119s provided limited airlift support to Far East Command's Korean operations throughout 1952. Beginning in 1953, however, the C-119s were employed in Southeast Asia in support of French operations in Indochina. Supplies, including ammunition, vehicles, and barbed wire, were delivered to Haiphong Airfield in ever increasing quantities. When US presence in Indochina could not be publicly escalated, plans were developed to utilize 581st personnel in a discrete support role. Refurbished C-119s, under French markings, were flown into Indochina by 581st crews, and French C-119s were flown out for depot repair at Clark AB. Instructors from the 581st were also tasked to train CIA-employed Civil Air Transport civilian aircrews in the C-119. American support for the French only prolonged the inevitable fall of the former colonial power. In May 1954, the French were defeated at Dien Bien Phu, thus ending 100 years of French colonial rule in Indochina.

=== Inactivation ===
In September 1953, after the Korean Armistice was signed that ended active conflict on the Korean peninsula the wing was inactivated and the group was reassigned directly to Thirteenth Air Force. The group was approximately one-half the size of the former wing and consisted of two squadrons—one flying squadron and one support squadron—as compared to six squadrons before the reorganization

In October 1954, the 581st relocated from Clark to Kadena Air Base, Okinawa, where it continued reduced operations out of that location for the next two years. In September 1956 the group was inactivated.

== Lineage ==
- Constituted as the 581st Air Resupply and Communications Group on 9 July 1951

Activated on 23 July 1951

- Redesignated 581st Air Resupply Group on 8 September 1953

Inactivated 12 October 1956

=== Components ===
- 581st Air Resupply and Communications Squadron (later 581st Air Resupply Squadron), 23 July 1951 – 18 September 1956 (attached to 581st Air Resupply and Communications Wing, 17 April 1952 - 8 September 1953)
- 581st Airborne Materials Assembly Squadron, 23 July 1951 – 18 September 1956 (attached to 581st Air Resupply and Communications Wing, 17 April 1952 - 8 September 1953)
- 581st Holding and Briefing Squadron, 23 July 1951 – 8 September 1953 (attached to 581st Air Resupply and Communications Wing after 17 April 1952)
- 581st Reproduction Squadron, 23 July 1951 – 8 September 1953 (attached to 581st Air Resupply and Communications Wing after 17 April 1952)

=== Assignments ===
- 581st Air Resupply and Communications Wing, 23 July 1951
- Twentieth Air Force, 8 September 1953
- 313th Air Division, 1 October 1954 – 12 October 1956 (attached to 18th Fighter-Bomber Wing for support)

=== Bases Assigned ===
- Mountain Home Air Force Base, Idaho, 23 July 1951
- Clark Air Base, Philippines, 18 July 1952
- Kadena Air Base, Okinawa, 8 September 1953 – 1 September 1956

=== Aircraft ===
- Fairchild C-119 Flying Boxcar 1951–1956
- Boeing B-29 Superfortress 1951–1956
- Grumman SA-16 Albatross 1951–1956
- Sikorsky H-19 1952–1956
- Douglas C-54 Skymaster 1956
- Douglas C-118 1952–1956

== See also ==
- Air Force Special Operations Command
- 313th Air Division
