= 322nd Signal Regiment =

Regiment of the SFR Yugoslav Air Force

322nd Signal Regiment: 322. puk veze
- Active: 1948 - 1964
- Disbanded: 1964
- Country: Yugoslavia
- Branch: Yugoslav Air Force
- Command: Zemun

The 322nd Signal Regiment (Serbo-Croatian: 322. puk veze / 322. пук везе) was a signal regiment established in 1948 as part of the SFR Yugoslav Air Force.

== History ==
The 322nd Signal Regiment was established on August 24, 1948, from Signal Battalion of Yugoslav Air Force Command with command at Zemun. With order from October 9, 1951, command was dislocated from Zemun to Šabac and Kiseljak until it was disbanded. With "Drvar-2" reorganization plan in 1964, regiment was disbanded and of him were formed 321st Signal Battalion and 322nd Signal Battalion of Yugoslav Air Force Command.

== Assignments ==
- Yugoslav Air Force Command (1948–1964)

== Commanding officers ==
- Dragutin Bašić
- Mirko Joković
- Ilija Radaković
