= List of Air Force-controlled wings of the United States Air Force =

Listing of Headquarters U.S. Air Force - controlled air force wings in numerical order

This is a list of Air Force-controlled (AFCON) Wings of the United States Air Force.

The United States Air Force from c.1948 onward had two main types of wings and groups: AFCON, those controlled by Headquarters Air Force and usually having one, two, or three digits, and listed here; and Major Air Command-controlled (MAJCON) wings and groups, having four digits, controlled by Major Commands and listed at List of MAJCOM wings of the United States Air Force. After the fall of the Soviet Union and the end of the Cold War, Headquarters Air Force terminated the ability of the Major Commands to control their own wings and groups. Thus all USAF flying and combat wings now have three digits and are controlled by Headquarters Air Force. Most are designated in one series, 1-900s. However, there are exceptions, such as the several wings designated "1st," as well as the two wings designated "301st".

Air control and warning groups, like the 11th Air Control Wing, Elmendorf AFB, Alaska, part of Alaskan Air Command; the predecessor of the 507th Tactical Air Control Wing, Shaw AFB, SC, under Tactical Air Command, designated the 507 C&C Group 15 July 1958; 507 TCG 1 July 1964; 507 TACG 15 June 1974; 507 TACW 1 October 1976. Redesignated 507 ACW 1 October 1991. Inactivated 12 June 1992; disbanded 8 September 1994. which included 20th TASS, 1990–91; 703rd TASS, 1967–88; were numbered in a separate series.

== Flying and combat wings ==
Remaining wings to add include the:

- 2nd Aircraft Delivery Group; 22nd Air Refueling Wing, 33rd Fighter Wing, Eglin AFB., Florida; 52nd Fighter Wing; 53rd Wing, Eglin AFB, Fl.; 55th Wing, Offutt AFB, NE; a large number of Air National Guard wings;
- 321st Air Expeditionary Wing; 375th Air Mobility Wing (most active); the 1st Photographic Charting Group was disbanded on 5 October 1944 but then reconstituted on 31 July 1985 and redesignated the 358th Special Operations Group, but not activated.
- 428th Military Airlift Group (former 28th Transport Group); 429th Combat Crew Training Group (former 29th Transport Group);
- 432d Wing; 433d Airlift Wing; 434th Air Refueling Wing; 435th Air Ground Operations Wing; 436th and 437th Airlift Wings; 440th; 442nd; the 447th Air Expeditionary Group, which was activated 18 December 2015 at Incirlik Air Base, Turkey, and which remains active;
- In February 2001, the 453rd Operations Group was converted to provisional status as the 453rd Expeditionary Air Refueling Group and assigned to United States Air Forces in Europe to activate or inactivate as needed for contingency operations; 470th Electronic Warfare Group formerly the 470th Bombardment Group; 472d Special Operations Wing (never active); 484th Air Expeditionary Wing; 491st Bombardment Group;
- MAJCOM but three-digit MATS wings: 518th Air Transport Wing; 520th Air Transport Wing; 525th Air Transport Wing and 540th Air Transport Wings;
- 518th Air Refueling Wing from WWII 68th Composite Wing; 521st Air Mobility Operations Wing; 522nd-524th, 525th Combat Crew Training Group, the former 25th Antisubmarine Wing; 527th-529th; 530th; 536 Cbt Crew Tng Gp WW II 26 Ferrying Group; 541st Balloon Gp pre WW II Organized Reserve unit, disbanded; 549th Tactical Air Support Training Group (inactive since 1988); 550th Tactical Missile Wing the former 550th Guided Missiles Wing; 551st; 553d, 554th, 555th all Balloon Gps, pre WW II Organized Reserve units, disbanded;; no entry or data for 556; 562d Balloon Gp pre WW II Organized Reserve unit, disbanded; 563d Balloon Group also; 558th-579th; 590th-599th;
- 600th Air Base Group, Torrejon Air Base, Spain, 1992–1994; 603rd Regional Support Group, Mildenhall, early 1990s before 1994 (see RAF Croughton), 604th Regional Support Group; - would leave McClellan for March AFB in July 1997; 605th; 606th Support Wing (constituted 1 January 1992, revoked 27 January 1992); [607th?] 608th Military Airlift Group-->608th Airlift Support Group; [609-611] 612th Theatre Operations Group; 615th Contingency Response Wing; 616th Regional Support Group, 617th Regional Support Group, [618th-622d?]; 623d Wing; [625-627?]; [629-632?] 634th?; 644?; 4000th Air Force Base Unit (Air Base) at Wright-Patterson AFB redesignated 2750th Air Base Wing on 5 October 1949, then redesignated 645th Air Base Wing on 1 October 1992, then redesignated the 88th Air Base Wing on 1 October 1994; 648th Support Group/648th Air Base Group, to c1994 at Brooks AFB, TX; 649th Support Group 1992–94 at Hill AFB, UT; 665th Air Base Wing; 720th Special Tactics Group; 724th Special Tactics Group; 821st Air Base Group, Thule Air Base, Greenland, 2002-c2020, and others.

=== List of wings and groups, 1-926 ===
Wing	Location	MAJCOM	Date inactivated	Replaced by
1st Air Base Wing	Andrews AFB, Maryland	Headquarters Command	30 Sep 1977	Insignia approved for 1401st ABW, later 1001 Composite Wing, 22 April 1955; established as 1st Composite Wing and activated on 1 July 1969; 1 ABW, 1 July 1976; replaced by 76th Air Base Group.
1st Space Wing	Peterson AFB, Colorado	AFSPC	15 May 1992	21st Space Wing
2d Space Wing	Schriever AFB, Colorado	AFSPC	30 Jan 1992	50th Space Wing
3d Space Wing	Peterson AFB, Colorado	AFSPC	1992	21st Space Wing
2nd Bomb Wing, Barksdale Air Force Base, Louisiana, active
3rd Wing, Joint Base Elmendorf–Richardson, Alaska, active
4th Fighter Wing, Seymour Johnson Air Force Base, North Carolina, active
5th Bombardment Wing, Minot Air Force Base, North Dakota, active
6th Air Refueling Wing redesignated on 1 October 2019 at MacDill Air Force Base, Florida, active
7th Bombardment Wing at Dyess Air Force Base, Texas, active
8th Fighter Wing active
9th Reconnaissance Wing, redesignated 1 October 1993 at Beale Air Force Base, California, active
10th Air Base Wing, activated 1 November 1994 at the United States Air Force Academy, Colorado, active
11th Wing, Washington DC, Air Force District of Washington, active
12th Flying Training Wing, activated 1 May 1972 at Randolph Air Force Base, Texas, active
13th Air Expeditionary Wing seemingly converted to provisional status (see 13th Air Expeditionary Group)
14th Flying Training Wing, activated 1 July 1972 at Columbus Air Force Base, Mississippi, active
15th Wing, redesignated 18 May 2010 at Hickam Air Force Base, Hawaii, active
16th Special Operations Wing	Hurlburt Field, FL.	AFSOC	16 November 2006	1st Special Operations Wing
17th Training Wing, activated 1 July 1993 at Goodfellow Air Force Base, Texas, active
18th Wing, at Kadena Air Base, Okinawa, active
19th Airlift Wing, at Little Rock Air Force Base, Arkansas, active
20th Fighter Wing, at Shaw Air Force Base, South Carolina, active
21st Space Wing	Colorado	Air Force Space Command	2020-21	Replaced by U.S. Space Force
22nd Air Refueling Wing active
23rd Wing active
24th Special Operations Wing active
25th Tactical Reconnaissance Wing	Chambley Air Base, France	USAFE	15 Oct 1966	
26th Intelligence Wing	Zweibrücken Air Base, Germany	USAFE	1991	Downgraded to group status
27th Special Operations Wing, redesignated and now active at Cannon Air Force Base, New Mexico, active
28th Bomb Wing, redesignated 1 June 1992 at Ellsworth Air Force Base, South Dakota, active
29th Flying Training Wing	Craig AFB, Alabama	ATC	30 September 1977	
30th Space Wing	Vandenberg Air Force Base, California	Space Operations Command (SPOC)	14 May 2014	Became Space Launch Delta 30
31st Fighter Wing, redesignated 1 October 1991, active at Aviano Air Base, Italy, since 1 April 1994
32d Tactical Fighter Wing	George AFB, California		1964	Consolidated with 32nd Fighter Group, 31 January 1984
34th Training Wing replaced by Cadet Wing, 1 August 2006, at United States Air Force Academy, Colorado
35th Fighter Wing, Misawa Air Base, Japan, active
36th Wing, Andersen Air Force Base, Guam, active
37th Training Wing, Keesler Air Force Base, Mississippi, active
38th Combat Support Wing	Ramstein Air Base, Germany	USAFE	1 May 2007	
39th Aerospace Rescue and Recovery Wing	Rhein-Main Air Base, Germany		1992	Redesignated 39th Special Operations Wing on 1 March 1988; inactivated 1992.
40th Air Expeditionary Wing	Diego Garcia	United States Central Command Air Forces	2006	Active as AEW 2001–06
41st Rescue and Weather Reconnaissance Wing	McClellan AFB, California	MAC	Inactivated 1 August 1989	Pacific Air Rescue Center constituted and activated, 2 Aug 1961; Organized, 8 Oct 1961, at Hickam AFB, Hawaii; Redesignated Pacific Aerospace Rescue and Recovery Center,8 Jan 1966; Redesignated 41st ARRW, 8 Feb 1969; Redesignated 41st RWRW, 1 Sep 1975, and stationed from that date onwards at McClellan AFB, CA; inactivated, 1 Aug 1989. Redesignated 41st Air Expeditionary Group, and converted to provisional status, 21 Oct 2005.
42nd Air Base Wing remains active
43rd Airlift Wing remains active
44th Missile Wing	Ellsworth AFB, South Dakota	AFPSC	5 July 1995	
45th Space Wing	Patrick Air Force Base, FL	AFPSC	c.2020	Space Launch Delta 45, U.S. Space Force
46th Test Wing	Eglin AFB, FL	AFMC?	1 October 2012	96th Test Wing
47th Flying Training Wing remains active
48th Fighter Wing, Lakenheath Air Base, UK; 49th Wing, Holloman Air Force Base, NM, both remain active
50th Space Wing	Schriever AFB, Colorado	AFSPC	2020	Space Delta 6, Space Delta 8, Space Delta 9, Peterson-Schriever Garrison
51st Fighter Wing, redesignated 1 October 1993 at Osan Air Base, South Korea, remains active
54th Tactical Fighter Wing	Kunsan Air Base, South Korea	PACAF	31 October 1970	Temporarily deployed aircraft withdrawn, base operations personnel absorbed by the 6175th Air Base Group.
56th Fighter Wing, redesignated on 1 October 1991 at Luke Air Force Base, Arizona, active
57th Wing, redesignated 15 June 1993 at Nellis AFB, Nevada, active
58th Special Operations Wing active
59th Medical Wing, consolidated, remaining active, on 1 July 1993 at Lackland Air Force Base, Texas, active
60th Air Mobility Wing, redesignated 1 October 1994 at Travis Air Force Base, California, active
61st Air Base Wing	Los Angeles AFB, CA		Inactivated 30 July 2010	61st Air Base Group
62nd Airlift Wing, redesignated on 1 December 1991 at McChord Air Force Base, WA., remains active
63d Military Airlift Wing	Norton AFB, California	MAC	Inactivated	
64th Flying Training Wing	Reese AFB, Texas	AETC	Inactivated	
65th Air Base Wing redesignated 65th Air Base Group on 11 August 2015 at Lajes Field, Terceira Island, Azores, Portugal, and remains active
66th Air Base Wing	Hanscom Air Force Base, Massachusetts	AFMC	Inactivated 30 September 2010	Replaced by 66th Air Base Group
67th Cyberspace Wing, redesignated c.15 September 2013 at Kelly Field, Texas, active
68th Air Refueling Wing	Seymour Johnson AFB, North Carolina	ACC	Inactivated 22 April 1991	Aircraft, personnel, merged into 4th Wing; lineage now continued by 53rd Electronic Warfare Group
69th Reconnaissance Group, inactivated on 28 June 2019 at Grand Forks Air Force Base, North Dakota, never upgraded to wing status
70th Intelligence, Surveillance and Reconnaissance Wing, activated on 1 January 2009 at Fort George G. Meade, Maryland, active
71st Flying Training Wing, activated on 1 November 1972 at Vance Air Force Base, Oklahoma, active
72nd Air Base Wing, activated on 1 October 1994 at Tinker Air Force Base, Oklahoma, active
73d Aerospace Surveillance Wing	Edwards AFB, California	ADC	Inactivated 30 Apr 1971	Seemingly no successor HQ; squadrons reassigned
74th Reconnaissance Group, inactivated 27 June 1949 at Stewart Field, New York, never upgraded to wing status
75th Air Base Wing, activated in 1994 at Hill Air Force Base, active
76th Maintenance Wing	Tinker Air Force Base, OK	Oklahoma City Air Logistics Center (AFMC)	Inactivated 1 October 2012	
77th Aeronautical Systems Wing	Wright-Patterson Air Force Base		Inactivated June 2010	
78th Air Base Wing, activated 1 October 1994, active
79th Test and Evaluation Group never upgraded to wing status
80th Flying Training Wing, activated 1 January 1973, active
81st Training Wing, activated 1 July 1993, active
82d Training Wing, activated 1 July 1993, active
83d Fighter-Day Wing	Seymour Johnson Air Force Base, North Carolina	TAC	8 December 1957	Activated 8 July 1956. Main flying unit was the 83d Fighter-Day Group. Replaced by 4th Fighter-Day Wing.
84th Combat Sustainment Wing	Hill AFB, Utah	AFMC	Inactivated in 2014	Replaced by directorates.
85th Group	NAS Keflavik, Iceland	ACC	28 June 2006	85 TFTW redesignated 85th Group, USAF left base, wing not replaced
86th Airlift Wing, Ramstein Air Base, Germany, active
87th Air Base Wing, activated 3 March 2009 at McGuire AFB, active
88th Air Base Wing, 89th Airlift Wing, 90th, 91st, 92d, 93d Wings all active
94th Airlift Wing, Air Force Reserve, Dobbins Air Reserve Base, GA., redesignated 1 February 1992, active
95th Air Base Wing	Edwards Air Force Base, NV	AFMC(?)	Inactivated on 13 July 2012	Mission transferred to elements of the 412th Test Wing, primarily to the 412th Mission Support Group.
96th Test Wing, redesignated 18 July 2012 at Eglin Air Force Base, FL, active
97th Air Mobility Wing active
98th Range Wing	Nellis		Inactivated 2011	Nevada Test and Training Range is a direct successor, continuing the wing's history and lineage
99th Air Base Wing, activated on 1 October 2005 at Nellis AFB, Nevada, active
100th Air Refueling Wing, activated on 1 February 1992 at RAF Mildenhall, UK, active
101st Air Refueling Wing, Maine Air National Guard, activated on 1 July 1976, active
102nd Intelligence Wing, Massachusetts Air National Guard, active
103rd Airlift Wing, Connecticut Air National Guard, redesignated 1 April 2008, active
104th Fighter Wing, Massachusetts Air National Guard, active
107th Attack Wing, New York Air National Guard, redesignated 15 March 2017, active
111th Attack Wing, Pennsylvania Air National Guard, redesignated 1 April 2011, active
116th Air Control Wing, Georgia Air National Guard, returned to solely ANG control 1 October 2011, active
117th Air Refueling Wing, Alabama Air National Guard, redesignated 16 October 1994, active
188th Wing, Arkansas Air National Guard, redesignated 7 June 2014, active
217th Air Operations Group, active
298th Air Defense Group, Hawaii Air National Guard, activated August 19, 2019, active
299th Tactical Forces Planning Group	St. Louis, MO	Air National Guard	Inactivated	Active 1970–72.
There are two 301st wings. The 301st Fighter Wing, which is one of three Second World War wings to be wings (others are 24th and 54th), was revived in 1972 as the overall headquarters for reserve F-105 units. The 301st Bombardment Wing was one of the first wings under the Hobson Plan, and served SAC, ultimately as an air refueling wing until 1992. Its operational unit 1947-1952 and 1991-1992 was the Second World War 301st Bombardment Group. Bothe were active from 1972-1992. To remove the duplication, the 301st Air Refueling Wing and 301st Operations Group were redesignated the 311th Wing and 311th Group, but this action was revoked. The wing has remained inactive since, and the group became the operations group of the fighter wing.
302d Airlift Wing, stationed at Peterson Air Force Base, Colorado, redesignated 1 February 1992, active
303d Aeronautical Systems Wing	Wright-Patterson AFB, Ohio	AFMC	Inactivated on 1 July 2010	Replaced by Aeronautical Systems Center, ISR Directorate (ASC/WI), on the same day.
304th Bombardment Group, inactivated on 30 December 1942, never upgraded to wing status
305th Air Mobility Wing active
306th Strategic Wing	RAF Mildenhall, UK	SAC	Inactivated	
307th Bombardment Wing, activated on 8 January 2011 at Barksdale AFB, LA, active
308th Armament Systems Wing	Eglin Air Force Base, FL	AFMC	Inactivated 30 July 2010	replaced by a directorate
309th Maintenance Wing	Hill AFB, Utah	AFMC	Inactivated 2012	
310th Space Wing active
311th Human Systems Wing	Brooks Air Force Base, TX	Air Force Materiel Command	Inactivated 2 October 2009	
312th Aeronautical Systems Wing				
313th Tactical Airlift Wing				
314th Airlift Wing, redesignated on 1 December 1991, active
315th Airlift Wing, Air Force Reserve, redesignated 1994 at Charleston Air Force Base active
316th Wing activated on 12 June 2020 at Joint Base Andrews, Maryland, active
317th Airlift Wing, upgraded from group to wing status on 6 July 2017 at Dyess Air Force Base, Texas, active
318th Cyberspace Operations Group, redesignated to that title on 13 September 2013, never upgraded to wing status
319th Reconnaissance Wing, redesignated at Grand Forks AFB, ND, 28 June 2019, remains active
320th Air Expeditionary Wing, redesignated on 1 February 2002, allotted to Air Force District of Washington in 2006 to activate or inactivate at any time
322d Tactical Airlift Wing				
323d Air Expeditionary Wing, inactive, converted to provisional status and inactivated 30 March 2008
24th Pursuit Group, inactivated 2 April 1946, redesignated 324th Tactical Fighter Wing on 31 January 1985, but never activated
325th Fighter Wing, redesignated 1 October 1991, Tyndall AFB, FL., active
326th Aeronautical Systems Wing		AFMC	Inactivated on 30 June 2010(?)	Replaced by directorates (?)
327th Aircraft Sustainment Wing	Tinker Air Force Base, OK	AFMC	Inactivated on 30 June 2010	Replaced by directorates (?)
328th Armament Systems Wing		AFMC	Inactivated 2010(?)	Replaced by directorates (?)
329th Armament Systems Group		AFMC	Inactivated 2007	Replaced by directorates (?)
330th Aircraft Sustainment Wing	Robins Air Force Base, GA	AFMC	Inactivated June–July 2010	Replaced by directorates (?)
331st Air Expeditionary Group		ACC	In provisional status	Has been active in the Continental United States under the 1st Air and Space Expeditionary Task Force.
332d Air Expeditionary Wing		ACC	In provisional status, last activated 19 May 2015	Routinely activated and inactivated in the Central Command area of operations; currently active, probably connected to Operation Inherent Resolve
333d Special Operations Wing	Never active	N/A	Consolidated 1985	Consolidated 633d Special Operations Wing of 1960s-70s and 333 BG of Second World War, but never activated
334th, 335th, 336th Air Refueling Wings all constituted but never activated
337th Aeronautical Systems Group		AFMC	Active 2006-08	Replaced by directorates (?)
338th Bombardment Group, inactivated 27 June 1949, disbanded on 9 September 1992, never upgraded to wing status
Wartime 339th Fighter Group redesignated as the 107th Fighter Group and allotted to the New York Air National Guard on 24 May 1946. Decades later, redesignated the 107th Attack Wing in 2017.
340th Flying Training Group, activated on 1 April 1998, active
341st Missile Wing				
342d Fighter-Day Wing				
343d Wing	Eielson Air Force Base, AK	AAC/Eleventh Air Force	Inactivated 20 August 1993	354th Fighter Wing
Wartime 344th Bombardment Group redesignated as the 126th Bombardment Group (Light) and allotted to the Illinois Air National Guard on 24 May 1946. Decades later, redesignated the 126th Air Refueling Wing in 1961.
345th Bombardment Wing, Tactical	Langley AFB, VA.	TAC	25 June 1959.	Consolidated 1985 with 345th Bombardment Group as 345 BW, but remained inactive
346th Bombardment Group, inactivated 30 June 1946, never upgraded to wing status
347th Rescue Wing	Moody AFB, Georgia	ACC	Inactivated 1 October 2006	23d Wing
9th Fighter Wing, disbanded 15 June 1983, reconstituted and redesignated as the 348th Tactical Electronics Group on 31 July 1985, but never activated and never upgraded to wing status
349th Air Mobility Wing, Air Force Reserve, redesignated 1 October 1994 at Travis Air Force Base, California, active
350th Electronic Systems Wing	Hanscom AFB, MA.	AFMC	Inactivated 30 June 2010	Replaced by directorates
351st Missile Wing				
352nd Special Operations Wing, redesignated on 23 March 2015 at RAF Mildenhall, UK, active
353rd Special Operations Group, redesignated on 1 December 1992 at Kadena Air Base, Okinawa, active
354th Fighter Wing, activated on 20 August 1993 at Eielson Air Force Base, Alaska, active
355th Fighter Wing, Davis–Monthan Air Force Base, AZ, active
356th Special Operations Wing	Never active	N/A		
357th Tactical Missile Wing	Never active	N/A		
Wartime 358th Fighter Group redesignated as the 122d Fighter Group and allotted to the Indiana Air National Guard on 24 May 1946. Decades later, redesignated the 122d Fighter Wing on 16 March 1992.
Wartime 479th Antisubmarine Group, disbanded on 11 November 1943, reconstituted on 31 July 1985 and redesignated 359th Special Operations Group, but not activated and not upgraded to wing status
360th Strategic Fighter Wing, established on 23 March 1953 but seemingly never organized or activated
361st Intelligence, Surveillance and Reconnaissance Group, activated at Hurlburt Field, FL., on 29 August 2008, never upgraded to wing status
362nd Air Expeditionary Group, converted to provisional status on 12 June 2002, never upgraded to wing status
363rd Intelligence, Surveillance and Reconnaissance Wing				
364th Fighter Group redesignated 131st Fighter Group and allotted to the Air National Guard on 24 May 1946. On 31 July 1985, the 54th Fighter Group was redesignated the 364th Tactical Fighter Group. This action was revoked on 19 February 2014 without the group ever being active.
365th Intelligence, Surveillance and Reconnaissance Group, activated on 17 February 2015 at Nellis AFB, Nev., never upgraded to wing status
366th Fighter Wing, redesignated on 30 September 2002 at Mountain Home Air Force Base, Idaho, remains active
11th Fighter Wing, reconstituted on 31 July 1985 and redesignated 367th Electronic Warfare Group, never activated, and disbanded on 9 September 1992
368th Tactical Air Support Group redesignated 368th Expeditionary Air Support Operations Group and converted to provisional status on 12 February 2009
369th Strategic Fighter Wing, established on 23 March 1953 but seemingly never organized or activated
370th Air Expeditionary Wing	Iraq	CENTAF	Likely inactivated in 2011	U.S. forces departing from Iraq, wing likely not replaced.
371st Expeditionary Air Support Operations Group, converted to provisional status
72nd Fighter Wing, disbanded 15 June 1983, reconstituted on 31 July 1985 and redesigned 372d Electronic Warfare Group, never activated, and then disbanded on 9 September 1992
373d Intelligence, Surveillance and Reconnaissance Group, redesignated 1 January 2009, now at Joint Base Elmendorf-Richardson, Alaska, but never upgraded to wing status
374th Airlift Wing, redesignated on 1 April 1992 at Yokota Air Base, Japan, active
376th Air Expeditionary Wing	Manas International Airport, vic Bishkek, Kyrgyzstan	CENTAF	Inactivated on 3 June 2014	U.S. forces arrived 2001; base informally known as Manas Air Base (or even Ganci Air Base); formally redesignated Transit Center at Manas in 2009; U.S. departed Manas Airport in 2014; wing not replaced.
377th Air Base Wing actiovated on 1 January 1993 at Kirtland Air Force Base, NM, active
378th Air Expeditionary Wing, activated 17 December 2019 at Prince Sultan Air Base, Saudi Arabia, active
379th Air Expeditionary Wing, active at Al Udeid Air Base, Qatar, active
380th Air Expeditionary Wing, active at Al Dhafra Air Base, United Arab Emirates, active
381st Training Group, (re)-activated on 1 April 1994 at Vandenberg Air Force Base, California, active
382d Bombardment Group, inactivated on 4 January 1946, never upgraded to wing status
383d Bombardment Group never upgraded to wing status
384th Air Expeditionary Wing		ACC	Inactive	
385th Strategic Aerospace Wing				
386th Air Expeditionary Wing				
387th Air Expeditionary Group converted to provisional status 1 January 2003, reportedly active in Jordan in 2003, never upgraded to wing status
388th Fighter Wing, redesignated as such on 1 October 1991 at Hill AFB, Utah, active
389th Strategic Missile Wing	F. E. Warren AFB, Wyoming	SAC	Inactivated 1965	
390th Strategic Missile Wing	Davis-Monthan AFB, Arizona	SAC	Inactivated 1984	
Wartime 391st Bombardment Group was re-activated, re-designated as the 111th Bombardment Group, and allotted to the Pennsylvania Air National Guard on 24 May 1946. Decades later, redesignated 111th Attack Wing, 1 April 2011
392d Strategic Missile Wing				
393rd Bombardment Group, inactivated on 1 April 1944, never upgraded to wing status(?)
Wartime 394th Bombardment Group redesignated as the 106th Bombardment Group (Light), and allotted to the New York Air National Guard, on 24 May 1946
395th Bombardment Group, inactivated on 1 April 1944, never upgraded to wing status(?)
396th Bombardment Group, inactivated 1 May 1944, never upgraded to wing status
397th Bombardment Wing	Dow AFB, Maine	SAC	Inactivated on 25 April 1968	
398th Air Expeditionary Group never upgraded to wing status
399th Tactical Missile Wing	Never active	N/A	Consolidated 1985?	
400th Tactical Missile Wing	Never active	N/A	Reconstituted and redesignated as 400 TMW 31 July 1985	400th Bombardment Group inactivated 1944.
401st Air Expeditionary Wing	Aviano Air Base, Italy	USAFE	Reduced to group status, June 2006	401st AEG
402nd Maintenance Wing	Robins Air Force Base, GA.	AFMC	Inactivated 1 October 2012	Replaced by directorates (?) Previously the number 402 was allocated to the 402d Fighter-Day Wing [superior to the 402d Fighter-Day Group?] which was established on 23 March 1953 but never made active.
403rd Wing, redesignated 1 July 1994 at Keesler Air Force Base, Mississippi, remains active
404th Air Expeditionary Group	Ramstein AB, Germany	USAFE	Active in 2013. Current status unclear.	
405th Air Expeditionary Wing	Thumrait, Oman	AFCENT	Converted to provisional status	Inactivated after initial phase of Operation Enduring Freedom (?)
406th Air Expeditionary Wing	Ramstein AB, Germany	USAFE	Converted to provisional status	Reactivated on 9 June 2023
407th Strategic Fighter Wing	Great Falls AFB, Montana	SAC	Inactivated 1957	
408th Strategic Fighter Wing	Never active	SAC	Established on 23 March 1953	Activated as 413 TFW, TAC, 1957
409th Air Expeditionary Group, allotted to United States Air Forces Europe to activate or inactivate as needed on 5 February 2001, never upgraded to wing status
410th Air Expeditionary Wing	Azraq AB, Jordan	AFCENT	Converted to provisional status 2002	30 of 36 F-16s returned home by summer 2003.
411th Tactical Missile Wing	Never active	N/A	Consolidated 1985	411th Bombardment Group disbanded on 1 May 1944
412th Test Wing	Active			
413th Tactical Fighter Wing	George AFB, California	TAC	Inactivated on 15 March 1959	Does not seem to have been replaced; activated in the Reserve as 413th Flight Test Group, 1 October 2003.
414th Fighter Group, active, never upgraded to wing status
415th Tactical Missile Wing	Never active	N/A	Consolidated 1985?	Second World War iteration of 415th Bombardment Group consolidated but never activated
416th Bombardment Wing	Griffiss AFB, NY	SAC	Inactivated 30 September 1995	Base closed and wing not replaced; active as provisional group in Uzbekistan, 2002–05.
417th Bombardment Group, inactive, never upgraded to wing status
418th Tactical Missile Wing	Never active	N/A	Groups consolidated 1985	Two Second World War iterations of the 418th Bombardment Group consolidated as 418 TMW in September 1985, but wing never activated under that designation
419th Fighter Wing, Air Force Reserve, redesignated 1992 at Hill Air Force Base, Utah, active
420th Military Airlift Group				(former 20th Ferrying Group)
421st Military Airlift Group				(former 21st Ferrying Group)
422d Tactical Airlift Group				(former 22d Ferrying Group)
425th Tactical Airlift Group				(former 25th Ferrying Group)
426th Tactical Intelligence Group reconstituted on 15 July 1983 but never activated
427th Tactical Airlift Group				(former 27th Air Transport Group)
430th Combat Crew Training Group reconstituted from 30th Transport Group of Second World War but never activated
431st Military Airlift Training Group reconstituted on 31 July 1985 from 1st Ferrying Group of Second World War but never activated. The 431st Reconnaissance Group was revoked before activation in the 1940s.
438th Military Airlift Wing				
439th Airlift Wing	(Active)	Air Force Reserve		
441st Troop Carrier Wing				
443d Military Airlift Wing, Training	Altus Air Force Base, OK	MAC	Inactivated 1 October 1992	97th Air Mobility Wing
444th Air Expeditionary Wing			Inactivated as 444 AEG on or after 15 October 2003	444 BG, Second World War; 444 AEG activated by 24 January 2003; inactivated on or after 15 October 2003; redesignated 444 AEW in 2010, but probably remained inactive.
445th Airlift Wing, Air Force Reserve, activated 1 October 1994, active
446th Airlift Wing, Air Force Reserve, redesignated 1 October 1994 at McChord Air Force Base, Washington State, active
447th Air Expeditionary Group remains active
448th Supply Chain Management Wing, redesignated on 1 April 2008 at Tinker Air Force Base, Oklahoma, remains active
449th Bombardment Wing	Kincheloe AFB, Michigan	SAC	Inactivated 30 September 1977	Wing not replaced, based closed, lineage continued by 449 AEG, redesignated and converted to provisional status 2003.
450th Bombardment Wing	Minot AFB, ND	SAC	Inactivated 25 July 1968	Replaced by 5th Bomb Wing
451st Air Expeditionary Wing			Reduced to group status c2014	Group active until mid-2021 at Kandahar Air Field, Afghanistan.
452nd Air Mobility Wing	(Active)			
454th Bombardment Wing	Columbus AFB, MS	SAC	Inactivated 2 July 1969	Not replaced
455th Air Expeditionary Wing	Bagram Airfield, Afghanistan	AFCENT	June 2021	Brig Gen Derek J. O'Malley served as Commander, 455th Air Expeditionary Wing/Task Force Vulture at Bagram until June 2021. U.S. withdrew, Afghanistan fell to the Taliban.
456th Bombardment Wing	Beale AFB, California	SAC	Inactivated 30 September 1975	17th Bombardment Wing
457th Air Expeditionary Group	Varies	USAFE-AFAF	Inactivated c. April 2021	Activated and inactivated as needed
458th Air Expeditionary Group	Ramstein AB, Germany	USAFE	Inactivated 25 July 2011	
459th Air Refueling Wing	Joint Base Andrews, MD	AMC	Became ARW 1 October 2003	
460th Space Wing	Buckley AFB, Colorado	AFSC	Inactivated 24 July 2020	Resources transferred to United States Space Force, Buckley Garrison, and operational USSF units.
461st Air Control Wing, activated on 1 Oct 2011 at Robins Air Force Base, GA, active
462d Strategic Aerospace Wing	Larson AFB, WA	SAC	Inactivated 25 June 1966	Larson AFB closed; wing consolidated with 462 BG 1984; activated as 462d Air Expeditionary Group July 2002
463d Tactical Airlift Wing	Dyess AFB, TX	MAC/AMC	Inactivated 1 October 1993	7th Wing
464th Tactical Airlift Wing	Pope AFB, North Carolina	TAC	Inactivated 31 August 1971	317th Tactical Airlift Wing
465th Bombardment Wing	Robins AFB, GA	SAC	Inactivated 21 July 1968	
466th Air Expeditionary Group, a provisional unit activated on 26 November 2012, never upgraded to wing status
467th Bombardment Group never upgraded to wing status
468th Bombardment Group, inactivated on 31 March 1946, never upgraded to wing status
469th Bombardment Group, disbanded on 1 April 1944, never upgraded to wing status (but EWG)
470th Bombardment Group, disbanded on 31 March 1944, never upgraded to wing status (but EWG)
471st Bombardment Group consolidated on 31 July 1985 with the 581st Air Resupply and Communications Wing as the 471st Special Operations Wing, but the wing remained inactive
473d Fighter-Day Wing			Established 23 March 1953.	No further information in Ravenstein 1984.
474th Tactical Fighter Wing	Nellis AFB, NV	TAC	Inactivated November 30, 1989	Wing not replaced
475th Air Base Wing	Yokota AB, Japan	PACAF	Inactivated 1992	374th Airlift Wing
476th Fighter Group never upgraded to wing status
477th Fighter Group never upgraded to wing status
478th Aeronautical Systems Wing		Air Force Materiel Command	Inactivated 2010 (?)	Replaced by directorate(s).
479th Tactical Training Wing	Holloman AFB, NM	Tactical Air Command?	26 July 1991	479th Fighter Group
480th Intelligence, Surveillance and Reconnaissance Wing, activated 1 February 2009 at Langley AFB, Va., active
481st Night Fighter Operational Training Group, inactivated on 31 March 1944 at Hammer Field, California, never upgraded to wing status
482nd Fighter Wing, redesignated 1 February 1992 at Homestead Air Reserve Base, active
483d Tactical Airlift Wing	Cam Ranh Bay AB, South Vietnam	PACAF	31 May 1972	The wing was inactivated and Cam Ranh Air Base was turned over to the South Vietnamese government on 15 May 1972.
484th Air Expeditionary Wing				
485th Air Expeditionary Wing	Tabuk, Saudi Arabia	ACC		2003 invasion of Iraq - undetermined. Inactive
486th Air Expeditionary Wing	Ahmed Al Jaber AB, Kuwait	ACC		Less than a year in 2003 during the beginning of the Iraq War. C-130 tactical airlift.
487th Air Expeditionary Wing	Cairo West, Egypt	ACC	April - later 2003	Probably inactivated after initial phase of Operation Iraqi Freedom ended.
488th Tactical Missile Wing never activated
489th Bomb Group, Air Force Reserve, activated 17 October 2015 at Dyess AFB, Texas, active
490th Bombardment Group, inactivated 7 November 1945, never upgraded to wing status
491st Bombardment Group, inactivated 8 September 1945, never upgraded to wing status
492d Special Operations Wing, activated 10 May 2017, remains active
493rd Bombardment Group		Army Air Forces	Reconstituted as AEG 2002 by AMC	Not activated as AEG, unless possibly with Baltic Air Policing - confusion with 493rd (E)FS, 48 FW?
494th Bombardment Wing, Heavy	Sheppard AFB, Texas	SAC	Inactivated 1966	Not replaced
495th Fighter Group	Shaw AFB, SC	Air Combat Command	Activated 8 March 2013.	
496th Fighter Training Group			Inactivated 26 April 1945	Not replaced
497th Air Refueling Wing	Plattsburgh AFB	SAC	15 September 1964	
498th Nuclear Systems Wing	Kirtland AFB, NM(?)	Air Force Materiel Command	Inactivated 27 January 2012	
499th Air Refueling Wing	Westover Air Force Base, Mass.	SAC	Inactivated 25 June 1966	KC-97 fleet withdrawn, wing inactivated.
500th Air Refueling Wing	Selfridge AFB	SAC	15 December 1964	Later active as 500th Air Expeditionary Group (AEG) for "Deep Freeze," replaced after 2006 by 13 AEG.
501st Combat Support Wing remains active
502d Air Base Wing, activated 1 August 2009, remains active
503rd Tactical Missile Wing	Never active	N/A		Duplicated(?) by 503rd Air Defense Group, reconstituted on 31 July 1985 and redesignated 503d Combat Support Group, but never activated.
504th Expeditionary Air Support Operations Group	Kabul, Afghanistan	CENTAF	12 May 2016	Forces being reduced, group not replaced, remaining responsibilities transferred to 817th Expeditionary Air Support Operations Squadron. Seemingly duplicated by 504th Bombardment Group, inactivated 15 June 1946.
505th Command and Control Wing remains active
506th Air Expeditionary Group	Kirkuk, Iraq	CENTAF	mid-2010 (?)	Converted to provisional status and activated 23 April 2003. Responsibilities being transferred in mid-2010; all U.S. forces left Iraq 2011.
507th Air Refueling Wing, Air Force Reserve, Tinker Air Force Base, OK., redesignated 1997, remains active
508th Aerospace Sustainment Wing	Hill AFB, UT	AMC	Inactivated 2010, replaced by directorates	
509th Bomb Wing, Whiteman Air Force Base, Miss., redesignated 1 September 1991, remains active
510th Tactical Missile Wing	Never active	N/A	Consolidated July 1985	Second World War replacement group and 705 SMW consolidated but never activated
World War II 4th Combat Crew Replacement Center Group redesignated 511th Combat Crew Training Group but never activated
512th Airlift Wing, Air Force Reserve, Dover Air Force Base, DE., redesignated 1 October 1994, remains active
513th Tactical Airlift Wing		RAF Mildenhall, UK		100th Air Refueling Wing became host unit
514th Air Mobility Wing, redesignated on 1 October 1994 at McGuire AFB, NJ., active
515th Air Mobility Operations Wing, activated on 5 June 2008 at Joint Base Pearl Harbor–Hickam, HI, active
516th Aeronautical Systems Wing	Wright-Patterson AFB, Ohio	AFMC	2010	Replaced by directorates
517th Training Group, activated 14 May 2019, never upgraded to wing status
World War II 19th Transport Group redesignated 519th Air Refueling Group but never activated
526th ICBM Systems Wing	Hill AFB, Utah	AFMC	2007	526th ICBM Systems Group
3rd Ferrying Group, Second World War, redesignated 533rd Tactical Airlift Group c1985, but never activated
15th Bombardment Operational Training Wing, Second World War, redesignated 535th Combat Crew Training Wing c1985, but never activated
38th Flying Training Wing (World War II), redesignated 538th Flying Training Wing but never activated; also 538th Aircraft Sustainment Group (2007-2010, inactive)
29th Tactical Control Group, Second World War, redesignated 539th Tactical Control Wing c1985, but never activated
16th Bombardment Operational Training Wing, Second World War, redesignated 540th Combat Crew Training Wing on 31 July 1985, but never activated
4th Ferrying Group, World War II, redesignated 541st Tactical Airlift Group c1985, but never activated
542d Crew Training Wing	Kirtland AFB, New Mexico	MAC/AMC	1994	58th Special Operations Wing
543d Intelligence, Surveillance and Reconnaissance Group active
544th Intelligence, Surveillance and Reconnaissance Group	Peterson AFB, CO.	ACC/25 AF/16 AF	24 July 2020	Inactivated on 24 July 2020 and replaced by Space Delta 7 of the United States Space Force.
545th Test Group	Edwards AFB	AFMC	1 August 1996	Second World War 5th Ferrying Group, consolidated with 6545th Test Group. 412th Test Wing direct superior.
546th Tactical Airlift Group	Never Active	Never Active	Never Active	Originally established in 1942 as California Sector, Air Corps Ferrying Command. Activated on 18 February 1942 Later became 6th Ferrying Group. Reconstituted and redesignated 546th TAG, 1985, but not activated.
547th Tactical Airlift Group				Originally established as 10th Pursuit Wing --
548th Tactical Airlift Group				548 TAG (established as the 8th Ferrying Group) duplicated by the 548th Intelligence, Surveillance and Reconnaissance Group (established as the 6th Photographic Technical Squadron)
550th Guided Missiles Wing				
552d Air Control Wing, redesignated 1 October 1991 at Tinker Air Force Base, OK., active
553rd Reconnaissance Wing	Korat Royal Thai Air Force Base, Thailand	Pacific Air Forces	15 December 1970	Not replaced, one squadron reassigned to 388 TFW.
554th Electronic Systems Wing	Hanscom AFB, Massachusetts	AFMC	Jun 2010	Became Program Executive Office Enterprise Information Systems (PEO EIS)
557th Weather Wing active
580th Air Resupply and Communications Wing				
581st Air Resupply and Communications Wing				
582nd Air Resupply and Communications Wing				
583d Air Resupply & Communications Wing activated 20 July 1953, action revoked retroactively in August 1953
584th Air Resupply & Communications Wing constituted along with the 583d, revoked
585th - 589th Tactical Missile Groups
601st Air Base Wing	Sembach Air Base, FRG	USAFE	31 March 1995	Activated 1968, became group, became TCW 1968, Air Base Wing 1993, inactivated 1995
602nd Air Control Wing	Davis–Monthan AFB, AZ	TAC	15 June 1992	602nd Tactical Control Group constituted and activated, 11 February 1966; 602 TCG organized, 1 March 1966. It absorbed the resources of the previous 4460th Tactical Control Group. The 602 TCG was redesignated the 602 Tactical Air Control Group on 15 June 1974, and redesignated and upgraded to wing status on 1 October 1976. It lost the "Tactical" from its title on 1 October 1991, and was inactivated on 15 June 1992. Davis-Monthan AFB after 1982, moved from Bergstrom Air Force Base, TX.
603d Air Base Wing	Sembach Air Base, FRG	USAFE	Mid-1968(?)	After the inactivation of the 38th Tactical Missile Wing in September 1966, the 603d Air Base Wing was activated, to administer Sembach and to support the 601st Tactical Control Group and the 7th Air Commando Squadron. 601st Tactical Control Wing was activated on 1 July 1968, absorbing the mission of the 603rd ABW.
616th Airlift Group	Elmendorf AFB, AK	MAC	1992	Was 616th Military Airlift Support Squadron, became 616th Airlift Support Squadron; began existence 1975. 61st Military Airlift Support Wing
620th Air Base Wing	RAF Upper Heyford, United Kingdom	USAFE	1994	Replaced 20th Fighter Wing. Inactivated with base closure, before 31 December 1994.
623rd Wing	England Air Force Base, Louisiana	TAC/ACC	1992	Replaced 23rd Wing on 1 June 1992, which was moving to Pope AFB, SC. Inactivated with base closure, 15 December 1992.
624th Regional Support Group	Hickam AFB, HI	Air Force Reserve	1 January 2002	Effectively replaced 604th Regional Support Group
628th Air Base Wing	Joint Base Charleston	ACC?	8 January 2010	Activated after Charleston Air Force Base was merged with Naval Weapons Station Charleston as a result of changes after Base Realignment and Closure Commission recommendations.
633d Special Operations Wing	Pleiku Air Base, South Vietnam	PACAF	1970	Not replaced - base closed
635th Supply Chain Operations Wing active
645th Air Base Wing, Wright-Patterson AFB redesignated 1 October 1992, then redesignated the 88th Air Base Wing on 1 October 1994;
646th Air Base Wing	Eglin AFB, FL	Air Force Systems Command	1994	The 3200th Support Wing (10 June 88 – 1 October 1992) replaced the 3201st ABG. 646 ABW active from 1 October 1992 to 1994.
647th Air Base Group, re-activated 14 May 2010 at Hickam Air Force Base, HI (JBPHH); reassigned to 15th Wing, 28 September 2012, active
650th Air Base Wing	Edwards AFB, CA.	AFMC?	Disestablished 1 October 1994	650th Logistics Group, probably part of 650 ABW, formed 1 October 1993. 95th Air Base Wing
651st Air Base Group	Tinker Air Force Base, Oklahoma	AFMC	inactivated 1 October 1994	76th Maintenance Wing
652nd Air Base Group	Wright-Patterson Air Force Base, Ohio	AFMC	inactivated 1 October 1994	77th Air Base Wing
653d Electronic Systems Wing	Hanscom AFB, MA	AFMC	Inactivated 30 June 2010	Most personnel and programs transferred to Cyber/Network-Centric Directorate
654th Air Base Group	Tinker Air Force Base, Oklahoma	AFMC	inactivated 1 October 1994	72nd Air Base Wing
655th Intelligence, Surveillance and Reconnaissance Wing, Air Force Reserve Command, officially became a wing Sept. 20, 2018 at Wright-Patterson Air Force Base
656th Special Operations Wing	Nakhon Phanom Airport, Thailand	PACAF	1975	Not replaced (?) - base closed soon afterwards
673d Air Base Wing, activated on 14 June 2010 at Joint Base Elmendorf-Richardson, Alaska, active
688th Cyberspace Wing active
689th Combat Communications Wing	Robins AFB, GA		Inactivated on 30 September 2013.	
691st, 692nd, 693rd, 694th Intelligence, Surveillance and Reconnaissance Groups
701st Tactical Missile Wing	RAF Greenham Common, UK	USAFE	31 May 1991	GLCM removed from service, based returned to UK MOD, wing not replaced.
702d Strategic Missile Wing	Presque Isle Air Force Base, Maine	SAC	25 June 1961	Snark removed from service, wing not replaced. Heritage carried on by 352d Special Operations Group, RAF Alconbury, UK
703d Strategic Missile Wing				
704th Strategic Missile Wing				
705th Strategic Missile Wing				
706th Strategic Missile Wing	Francis E. Warren AFB	SAC	1 July 1961	389th Strategic Missile Wing
707th Intelligence, Surveillance, and Reconnaissance Group active. Traces lineage to the MAJCON 6917th Security Squadron (Electronic Security Command etc.)
708th Strategic Missile Wing was to activate in 1958 at a Huntsville, AL army installation, probably Redstone Arsenal, but the action was revoked.
710th Air Base Wing	RAF Alconbury, UK	USAFE	30 September 1995	Wing was activated as the host unit for RAF Alconbury, after 1 Nov. 1994, move of 10 ABW to Colorado. 423d Air Base Squadron activated at RAF Molesworth to assume mission on 12 July 1995.
711th Human Performance Wing				
722d Air Refueling Wing	March Air Force Base, CA.	AMC	1 April 1996	Wing activated 1 January 1994 to replace the 22d ARW, which was moving to McConnell AFB, KS, w/o/p/e. In process of inactivation, base responsibilities transferred to Air Force Reserve 452d Air Mobility Wing.
812th Strategic Support Wing	Ellsworth AFB, SD	SAC	June–July 1990 - c10 September 1991	Succeeded 812th Combat Support Group. After inactivation, base support and host wing functions taken on by 28th Bombardment Wing.
868th Tactical Missile Training Group			See 868th Tactical Missile Training Squadron	The group was disestablished after the INF Treaty saw the GLCM removed from service. A staff study dated April 1988 said that "The main emphasis should be placed on reassignment of the personnel assigned to the 868 TMTG" rather than the training assets, which would not likely pose a problem.
913th Airlift Wing	NAS Willow Grove, Pennsylvania	AFRC	2007	
919th Special Operations Wing	Duke Field, FL		1 August 1992	Upgraded in status from 919th Special Operations Group.
920th Rescue Wing				
926th Fighter Wing	NAS New Orleans, Louisiana	AFRC	2007	926th Group
960th Cyberspace Wing, activated in the Reserve on 28 October 2018, Joint Base San Antonio-Lackland, TX., active

Other active wings in the 900 series as of January 2023 include the 908th Airlift Wing; the 910th Airlift Wing; the 911th Airlift Wing; the 914th Air Refueling Wing, the 916th Air Refueling Wing; the 926th Wing, the 927th Air Refueling Wing; the 931st Air Refueling Wing; the 932d Airlift Wing; the 934th Airlift Wing; the 940th Wing; and the 944th Fighter Wing.

== Non-flying and non-combat wings ==
Non-flying or non-combat wings, such as the 1st Medical Service Wing and 1st, 2d Weather Wing, 3rd-7th Weather Wings, 82nd Combat Security Police Wing, 501st and 601st Tactical Control Wings, 601st Tactical Air Control Wing, 602d Tactical Air Control Wing, later Air Control Wing, see above, 901st-908th Reserve Training Wings (906th at Miami (Miami News, 24 June 1951); 907th at Brooks AFB), Reserve Air Depot Training Wings, are listed in Charles A. Ravenstein, "Air Force Combat Wings: Lineage and Honors Histories 1947-77," Office of Air Force History, Washington, D.C. 1984, viii.

=== Air Depot Wings ===
Air Depot Wings included the 13th, 24th, 25th, 29th, 30th 39th, 59th, 73d, 75th Air Depot Wing, 77th Air Depot Wing, 80th Air Depot Wing, 85th Air Depot Wing, and 88th Air Depot Wings.

The 25th Air Depot Wing was activated at Hill Air Force Base, Utah, on 27 October 1949 with Brigadier General Norris B. Harbold assigned as the wing commander. The mission of the wing was to provide depot maintenance and supply support to four combat wings, with its normal assignment to the Air Materiel and Service Division, or to Air Materiel and Service Force. The wing was integrated into the Ogden Air Materiel Area from July to December 1950.

The 30th Air Depot Wing was located at RAF Sealand, but plans were made to relocate it to RAF Brize Norton, both in the UK. Most assigned personnel of the 30th Air Depot Group were reassigned to the 7558th Air Depot Group of the 59th Air Depot Wing, effective from 26 November 1951. All staff sections of the 30th Air Depot Wing were dissolved, and a Consolidated Adjutant and Military Personnel Section was formed. 30th Air Depot Wing was relieved from assignment to the 59th Air Depot Wing effective 27 November 1951. 30th Air Depot Wing began operating as a tenant organization at RAF Sealand, with base support for the wing being provided by the 7558th Air Depot Group as of 27 November 1951. Jurisdiction of RAF Sealand was transferred from the 30th Air Depot Wing to the 7558th Air Depot Wing on 27 November 1951.

The 75th Air Depot Wing arrived in South Korea (Chinhae) on 2 January 1953, replacing the 6405th Air Support Wing. May have been disestablished in January 1956.

The 7200th Air Depot Wing (ADW) at Erding Air Base, Federal Republic of Germany, was redesignated as the 85 ADW on 25 July 1949. The 85 ADW was transferred to Twelfth Air Force on 21 January 1951. On 10 July 1952, 85 ADW and its supporting units were reassigned from 12th Air Force to Headquarters, USAFE. On 1 December 1953, all units of the 85 ADW were inactivated. Personnel assigned to Headquarters 85 ADW were reassigned to the newly activated 7485th Air Depot Wing.
