= William Crumm =

US Air Force general (1919-1967)

William Joseph Crumm
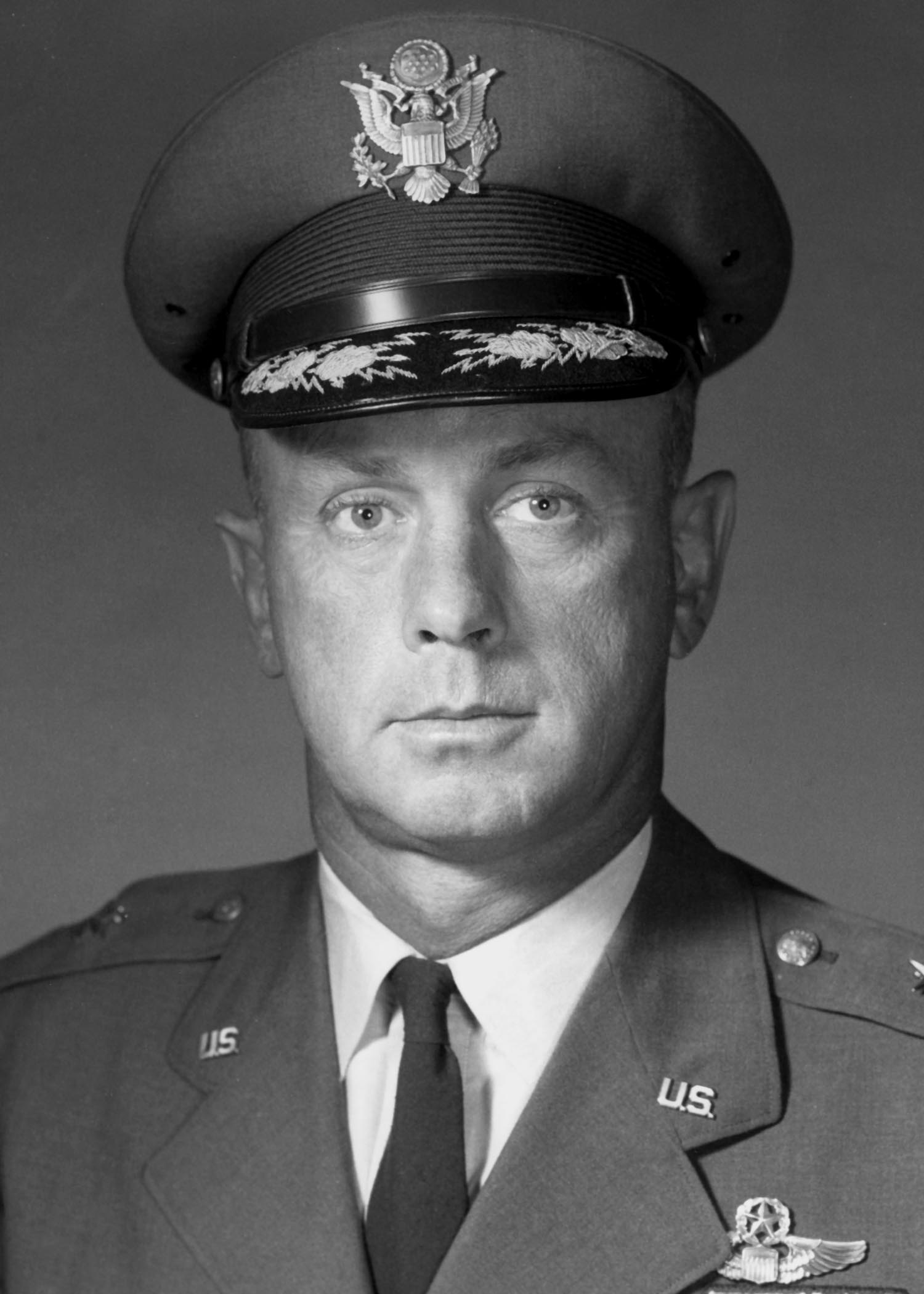
- Major General William J. Crumm, USAF
- Born: September 20, 1919; New York City, New York, U.S.
- Died: July 6, 1967 (aged 48); South China Sea
- Burial place: Arlington National Cemetery
- Military career
- Allegiance: United States of America
- Branch: United States Army Air Forces; United States Air Force
- Service years: 1941–1967
- Rank: Major general
- Unit: 3d Air Division
- Commands: 3d Air Division, Strategic Air Command
- Conflicts: World War II; Vietnam War †
- Awards: Legion of Merit (2), Distinguished Flying Cross; Bronze Star; Air Medal (4)

William Joseph Crumm (September 20, 1919 – July 6, 1967), was a United States Air Force major general who was killed in July 1967, during the Vietnam War. General Crumm commanded the 3d Air Division from 1965 until his death in a B-52 mid-air collision with another B-52 bomber over the South China Sea. General Crumm was the first American general officer and the first of two Air Force general officers (pilots) who were killed during the Vietnam War.

== Early life and career ==
General Crumm was born on September 20, 1919, in New York City. He entered the military in 1941, and was commissioned a second lieutenant in the United States Army Air Forces and received his wings in 1942.

General Crumm's first assignment was as a B-17 bomber pilot with the 91st Bombardment Group, based in the European Theater of Operations. Upon returning to the states, he lectured at thirty combat crew schools and every major aircraft factory as a member of the "Most Deserving Bomber Crew of the 8th Air Force". In May 1943, he was transferred to the 796th Bombardment Squadron at Alexandria, Louisiana as Operations Officer, and later that year moved to the staff of Second Air Force in Colorado Springs, Colorado.

He assumed command of the 61st Bombardment Squadron at Smoky Hill Army Air Field in Kansas, where he successfully moved the squadron to Guam. In 1946, he transferred to Headquarters, Strategic Air Command (SAC) as assistant training officer in the Flying Training Division, and would in rapid succession hold positions as chief of the Bombardment Section and Training Section deputy and acting chief. He left SAC in August 1947 to attend the Air Command and Staff School, Maxwell Air Force Base, Alabama. In July 1948, he assumed another squadron command—the 344th Bombardment Squadron, based at Spokane Air Force Base in Washington. During January 1949, he assumed the duties as 98th Bombardment Group director of operations at Spokane AFB.

He returned to SAC in 1950, as chief of the Special Projects Division, Director of Operations. In 1953 he moved to the Operational Plans Division within the Director of Operations at SAC. In October 1954, after attending the B-47 Advanced Flying School at McConnell Air Force Base in Wichita, Kansas, he was assigned to March Air Force Base, California, first as deputy commander of the 22nd Bombardment Wing, then as Fifteenth Air Force director of operations.

He moved to Greenland in September 1956, serving as a task force commander at Thule Air Base. April 22, 1957 saw his return to March as commander of the 320th Bombardment Wing. In October 1958, he transferred to Headquarters, United States Air Force in Washington, D.C. as chief of the Strategic Division, reporting to the Deputy Chief of Staff, Operations. In May 1960, he was assigned as chief of the Atomic Operations Division, J-3, Joint Chiefs of Staff, and in August of that year returned to SAC as the senior Air Force member to the newly organized staff, director, strategic target planning. In June 1962, he became that group's chief of operations.

He was assigned as commander, 3rd Air Division, at Andersen Air Force Base, Guam, in July 1965.

== Death ==
General Crumm was declared to be "missing and presumed dead" 18 days after a July 6, 1967, collision between the Boeing B-52D Stratofortress "Kilo Red 2" of the 22nd Bombardment Wing on which he was flying, and another B-52D bomber, over the South China Sea. At the time of the mid-air collision, both aircraft were en route to a bombing mission over Vietnam. He was the first American and Air Force general officer killed in the Vietnam War. His remains were never recovered; a cenotaph is located at Arlington National Cemetery.

== Awards and decorations ==
Major General Crumm was rated as a command pilot. His military awards include two Legion of Merits, the Distinguished Flying Cross, the Bronze Star, four Air Medals, the Air Force Commendation Medal, and two Army Commendation Medals.

== See also ==
- Robert F. Worley
