= Norris B. Harbold =

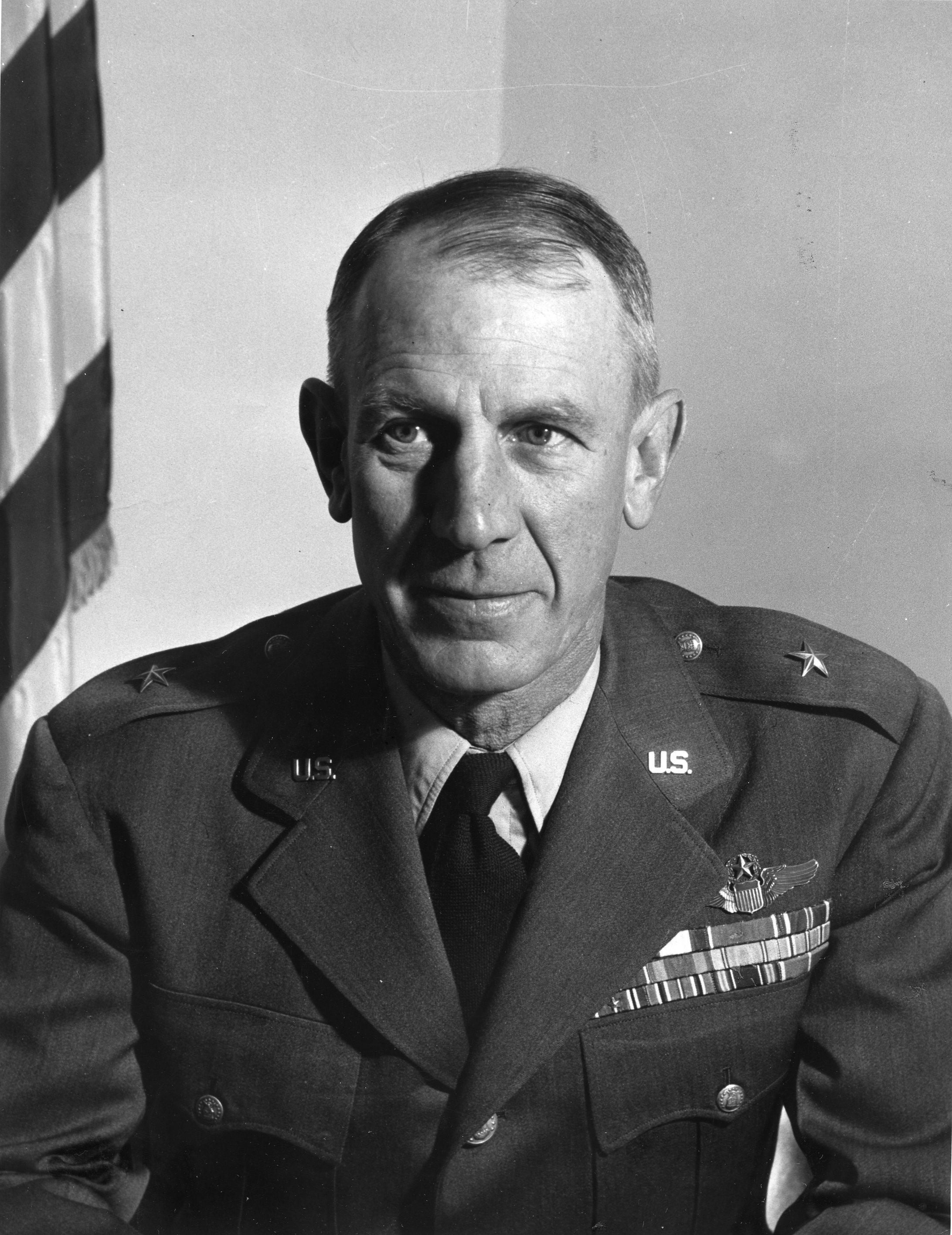
- Born: 14 July 1906; Fort Niobrara, Nebraska
- Died: 12 August 1993 (aged 87)
- Alma mater: United States Military Academy; National War College
- Military career
- Allegiance: United States
- Branch: Army; Air Force
- Service years: 1928–1957
- Rank: Major General
- Nickname: Skippy
- Conflicts: World War II
- Awards: Distinguished Service Medal; Legion of Merit; Distinguished Flying Cross; Bronze Star
- Football career

Army Cadets (1924–1927)
- Position: End

Norris Brown Harbold Sr. (14 July 1906 – 12 August 1993) was an American general. While attending the United States Military Academy, Harbold was a standout college football and lacrosse player for the Army Cadets. His military work centered mainly on navigation, administration, and training; with Harbold being regarded as a pioneer in the development of air navigation training.

== Early life and education ==
Harbold was born in on 14 July 1906 at Fort Niobrara, Nebraska. He was born into a United States Army family, being the son of Major R. P. Harbold. He received his primary education at public schools in the United States and at private schools, including the Honolulu Military Academy, Queen Anne High School (in Seattle, Washington) at a private school in France, and at the New York Military Academy (NYMA).

== United States Military Academy ==
Portrait of Harbold as a West Point cadet

Portrait of Harbold as a West Point cadet, circa 1928

In July 1924, Harbold entered the United States Military Academy. Excelling in sports, he was given varsity letters in for his career on the football team and lacrosse team of the Army Cadets. He also competed on the swimming team.

In his final year at the university, he was a cadet captain. He served as vice-president of the class of 1928.

=== College football ===
Harbold played college football as an end for the football team. While on the team, he received the nickname "Skippy", inspired by the appearance while he played of bangs of hair that hung over his forehead. Prior to attending West Point, Harbold had only played a single season of high school football at NYMA.

In 1923, 1924, and 1925, while Harbold was a member of the football team, he was not regularly played in varsity games. He did play in some games, such as the school's October 1925 victory against the Notre Dame Fighting Irish.

==== 1926 season ====
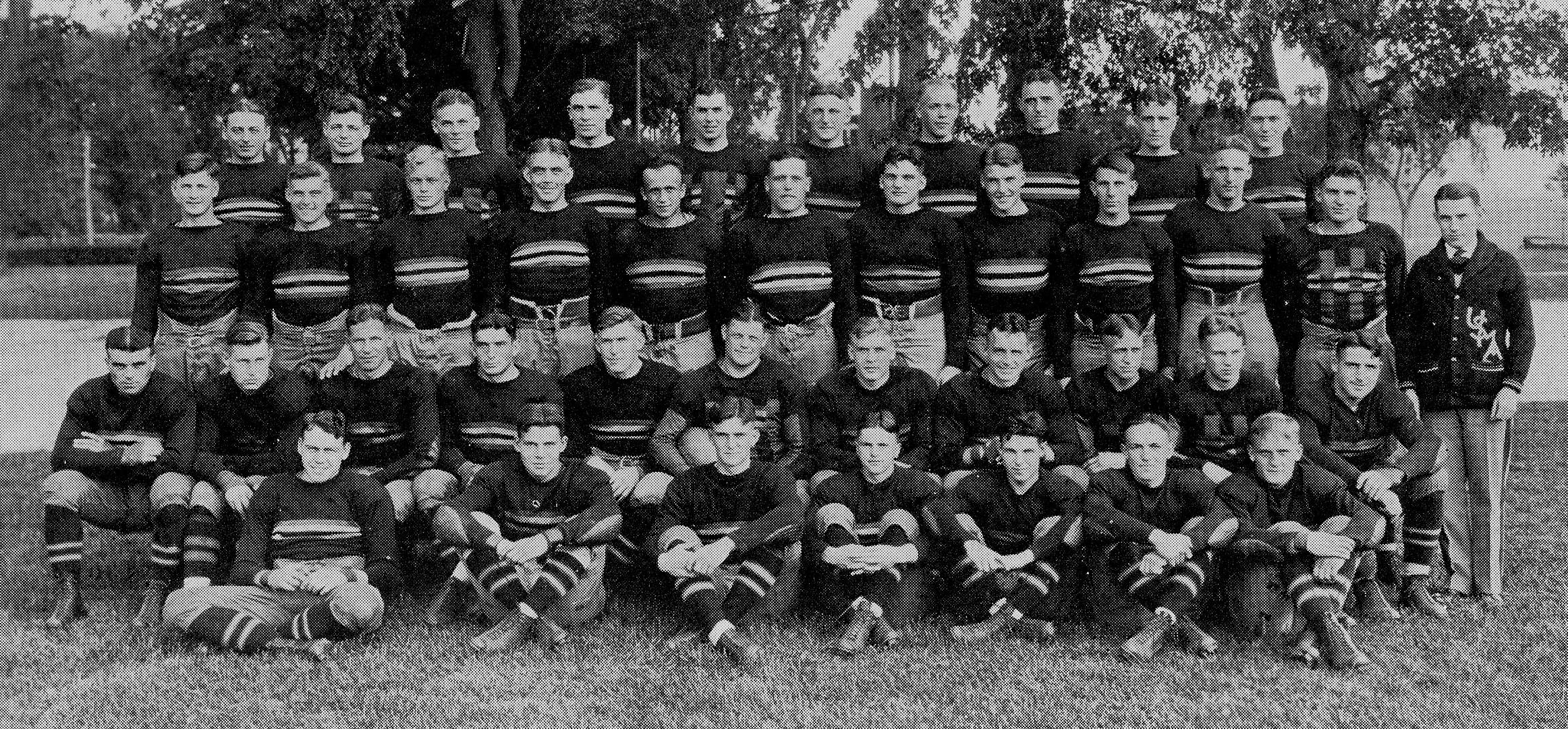
1926 Army Cadets (Harbold standing fourth from right in the third row)

Photographs of Harbold with the Army Cadets, circa 1926

The team's 1926 season was the first in which Harbold regularly played in varsity games. He filled the role in the team's roster that had previously been occupied by Henry Baxter, prior to Baxter's graduation. Harbold's performance during the football season brought him national note.

In November, Harbold and the Army team suffered an upset loss against the Notre Dame team. This marked the only loss of Army's 1926 season.

Harbold played in the storied 1926 Army–Navy Game. Knute Rockne (coach of Notre Dame, who had attended the Army-Navy game) wrote of the game, "The Army ends, Harbold and [Charles F.] Born, were great and did everything that an end ought to do". Harbold scored the second of four touchdowns scored by Army in the game. While he played strongly, he fumbled his team's final touchdown attempt, resulting in a tied game.

==== 1927 season ====
During an October 22 game against the Yale Bulldogs at the Yale Bowl in New Haven, Connecticut, Harbold caught a long diagonal pass from halfback Red Cagle while standing 3 yards from the Yale end zone. he was stopped from advancing by Yale defense; but in the next play, the Army team started on the three yard line and was able to score a touchdown. In the game, Harbold an injury which prevented him from playing in any subsequent regular season games, except for the 1927 Army–Navy Game.

Harbold was considered by some rankings to be an All-American, including in Lawrence Perry's ranking. Grantland Rice, Knute Rockne, and Tad Jones named Harbold as an honorable mention in their rankings.

=== College lacrosse ===
In addition to football, Harbold was also successful as member of the academy's lacrosse team. He played second defenseman in a 2 May 1927 game against the Hobart Statesmen, in which Army ended put an end to lengthy winning streak held by Hobart. The rest of Army's football backfield also played with Harbold on the lacrosse team during the 1927 season.

Harbold and five other lacrosse players in his academy graduating class (Note: Charles F. Born, Anderson L. Frederick, Emmett O'Donnell Jr., LaVerne G. Saunders, Lyle Seeman) (the class of 1928) would go on to be achieve the rank of general in their military careers. As of 2021, the six of them ranked among only 83 Army men's lacrosse players to later achieve the rank of general.

== Military career ==
Harbold's military career saw him serve in a number of leadership posts primarily focused on navigation, administration, training. He is considered to have been a pioneering figure in the development of air navigation training.

=== Early career ===
Harbold graduated from the United States Military Academy on 9 June 1928, and was commissioned a second lieutenant of the United States Army's Field Artillery Branch. In September 1928, he began flight training at the Primary Flying School at Brooks Field in Texas. In 1929, he graduated from Advanced Flying School at Kelly Field in Texas. After graduating, he remained at Kelly Field as a member of the 22nd Photo Section.

Harbold was transferred to the Army Air Corps in November 1929, and was certified as a pilot on 8 August 1930. During his career in aviation, Harbold became rated as a command pilot and aircraft observer.

In August 1930, Harbold was assigned an engineering officer within the 94th Pursuit Squadron stationed at Selfridge Field in Michigan, where he remain for nearly two years. In May 1932, he joined the Air Navigational Experimental Unit stationed at Bolling Field in Washington, D.C.. He was one of the first three Air Corps officers assigned to study air navigation as a specialized field, being taught by Harold Gatty. As one of the first three officers to study the field, Harbold was considered a founder of the Army Air Force's air navigation training program.

In October 1933, Harbold became a flight training instructor at the Navigation School at Langley Field in Virginia. On 1 April 1934, he was permanently promoted to first lieutenant.

From June 1934 to March 1935, Harbold served in the 19th Bombardment Group at Rockwell Field in California, where training courses he had designed while at Bolling Field were being taught for the first time. He was temporarily promoted to major on 9 June 1938. In March 1935, he was named a supply officer in the 76th Service Squadron located at Rockwell Field. In June 1936, he transferred to the 32nd Bombardment Squadron stationed at March Field in California. While at March Field, a training accident occurred in which a 100 pounds (45 kg) bomb tore a hole in his right wing when he was still 50 miles (80 km) from base, after which he managed to navigate his damaged plane safely to base.

In April 1937, Harbold was named an adjunct of the 28th Bombardment Squadron and was stationed at Nichols Field in The Philippines. He was later made the squadron's operations officer. In July 1938, he was placed in command of the 3rd Pursuit Squadron, also stationed at Nichols Field. His stint of being stationed at Nichols Field ended in June 1938.

In June 1939, Harbold was appointed operations and engineering officer of the 91st School Squadron at Maxwell Field in Alabama. In April 1940, he was placed in command of the squadron.

=== World War II ===
In October 1940, Harbold was assigned the director of the Air Navigation Training School at Barksdale Field in Louisiana. He participated in the instruction of the first class to graduate from a revived navigation school at Barksdale, which was ultimately graduated on 1 February 1941. He was elevated to major while at the field. In July 1940, he was appointed director of training at the Advanced Flying School at Turner Field in Georgia. On 31 January 1941, he was temporary prompted to lieutenant colonel, and on 5 January 1942 he was temporarily promoted to colonel.

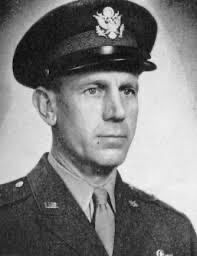
Portrait of Harbold

In May 1942, Harbold assumed command of Selman Field in Monroe, Louisiana. On 1 March 1942, he was temporarily promoted to brigadier general. His initial task was organizing the establishment of a flight school at the field, collaborating with officers from the Army Corps of Engineers to develop its construction plan. Selman Field was activated when construction began on 15 June 1942, with Harbold posted as its commander. The base went into full operation three months later. In February 1943, he was appointed assistant to the assistant chief of staff for operations of the Training Command at Fort Worth, Texas. On 27 February 1944, he was permanently promoted to major. In March 1944, he became the commander of the 80th Flying Training Wing at San Marcos Field in Texas.

In November 1944, Harbold was named the chief of staff of the Third Bomb Division, stationed in the European Theater of World War II. On 9 June 1945, he was permanently promoted to colonel.

=== U.S. Army Strategic Air Forces and intelligence ===
In July 1945, Harbold returned to the United States. In August 1945, was made assistant chief of staff for intelligence of the U.S. Army Strategic Air Forces (USASTAF) in the Pacific Theater of World War II. In October 1945, he was further assigned additional duties as the commanding general of the USASTAF. Four months subsequent to this, he was appointed the chief of the Air Information Commission in the Office of the Assistant Chief of Air Staff for Intelligence, stationed at the Air Corps Headquarters. In January 1947, he was assigned the deputy assistant chief of staff for intelligence. From August 1947 to June 1948, he attended the National War College.

=== Brigadier General (1948–1957) ===
On 2 April 1948, several month ahead of his graduation from the National War College, Harbold was permanently promoted to brigadier general. Harbold was made the inspector general of the Air Materiel Command at Wright-Patterson Air Force Base in Ohio. On 27 October 1949, the 25th Air Depot Wing (an AFCON wing) was activated at Hill Air Force Base in Utah with Brigadier General Harbold assigned as the wing commander. The mission of the wing was to provide depot maintenance and supply support to four combat wings, with its normal assignment to the Air Materiel and Service Division, or to Air Materiel and Service Force. The wing was integrated into the Ogden Air Materiel Area from July to December 1950. In April 1950, Harbold was made the commander of Ogden Air Materiel Area at Hill Air Force Base. At the time, the base was largest single employer in all of Utah.

In April 1951, he was designated as the deputy commander of the 3650th Indoctrination Wing and Sampson Air Force Base in Seneca Lake, New York. In this role, he was the base's second in command, serving under Frank A. Armstrong. On 7 May, Harbold was designated to assume the command of Sampson Air Force Base, succeeding Armstrong (who had been reassigned to the Strategic Air Command) and becoming commander of the 3650 Military Training Wing located at the base. Harbold served as commander of the base from 19 July 1951 to 19 July 1952. On 9 October 1951 he was temporarily promoted to major general.

Portrait of Harbold in the early 1950s as director of training

In June 1952, he reassigned Air Force Headquarters and named the director of training in the Office of the Deputy Chief of Staff for Personnel. He left Sampson Air Force Base to assume role the following month. On 27 October 1954, Harbold was temporarily promoted to major general. In January 1956, Harbold was moved to the Air Defense Command, taking command of the Eastern Air Defense Force stationed at Stewart Air Force Base in New York state. On 15 January 1957, he was further assigned simultaneous duties as the commander of the Eastern Continental Air Defense Region of the Continental Air Defense Force, which was also stationed at Stewart Air Force Base.

== Retirement ==
Harbold retired from the military on 26 August 1957. Harold authored a memoir, which was published in 1970.

== Personal life and death ==
Late into his time at Kelly Field, Harbold wed Mary Stevens Mitchell of San Antonio, Texas.

Harbold's namesake son, Norris B. Harbold Jr., graduated West Point in 1956, and was given a major award by West Point in recognition of his contribution to their athletics program.

Harbold died on 12 August 1993.

== Recognition ==
=== Military decorations ===
- Distinguished Service Medal with oak leaf cluster (awarded 28 August 1945)
- Legion of Merit with oak leaf cluster
- Distinguished Flying Cross
- Bronze Star Medal

=== Civilian honors ===
- Institute of Navigation fellow (fellowship awarded posthumously in 2001 "for his life long contributions to air navigation")

=== Foreign orders of chivalry ===
- Order of the British Empire (Honorary Comander)
