= 615th Contingency Response Wing =

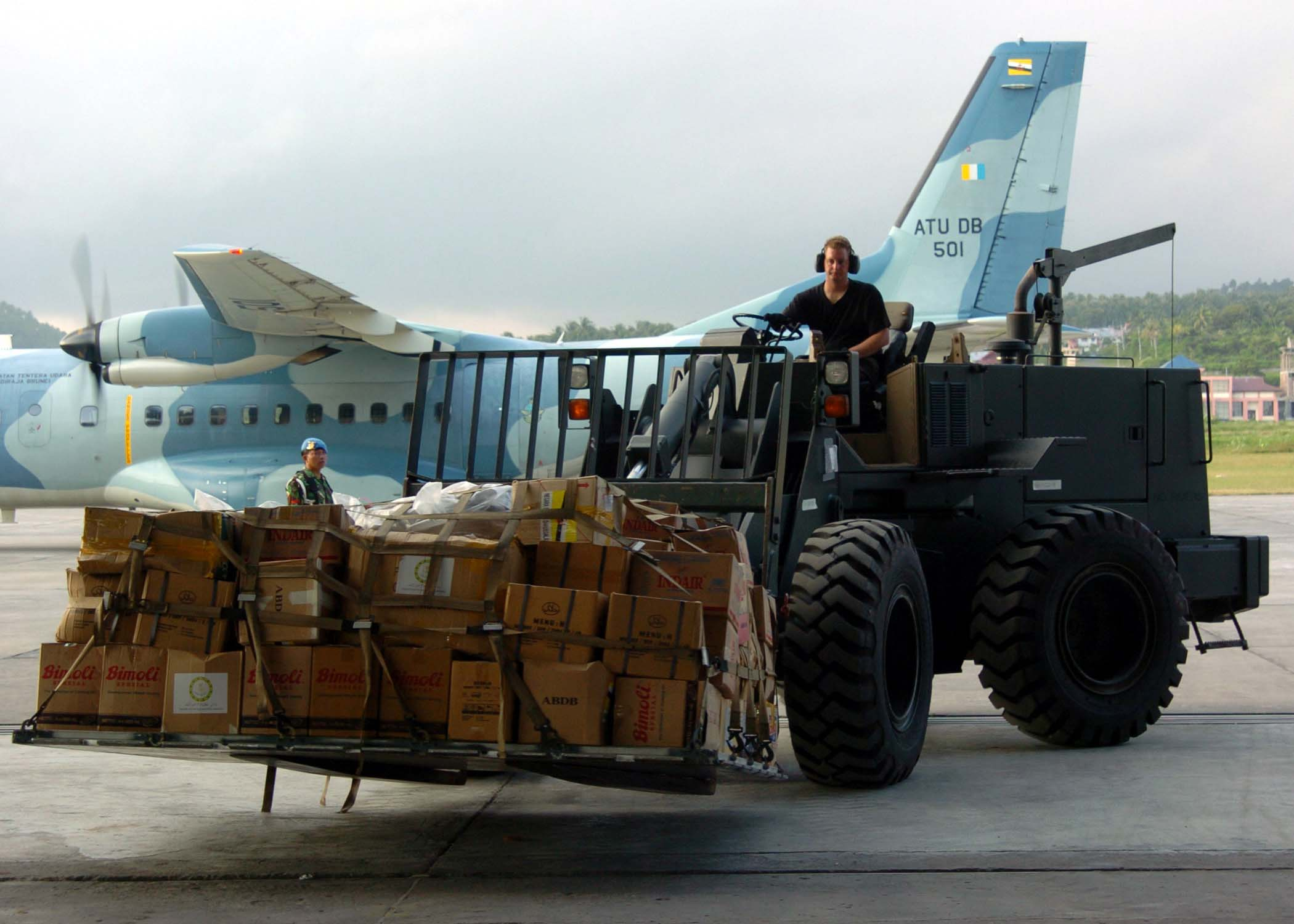
- Airman of the 615th Air Mobility Operations Group transports relief supplies to Navy helicopters at Sultan Iskandar Muda International Airport, Indonesia
- Active: 1994–2012
- Country: United States
- Branch: United States Air Force
- Decorations: Air Force Outstanding Unit Award

Insignia
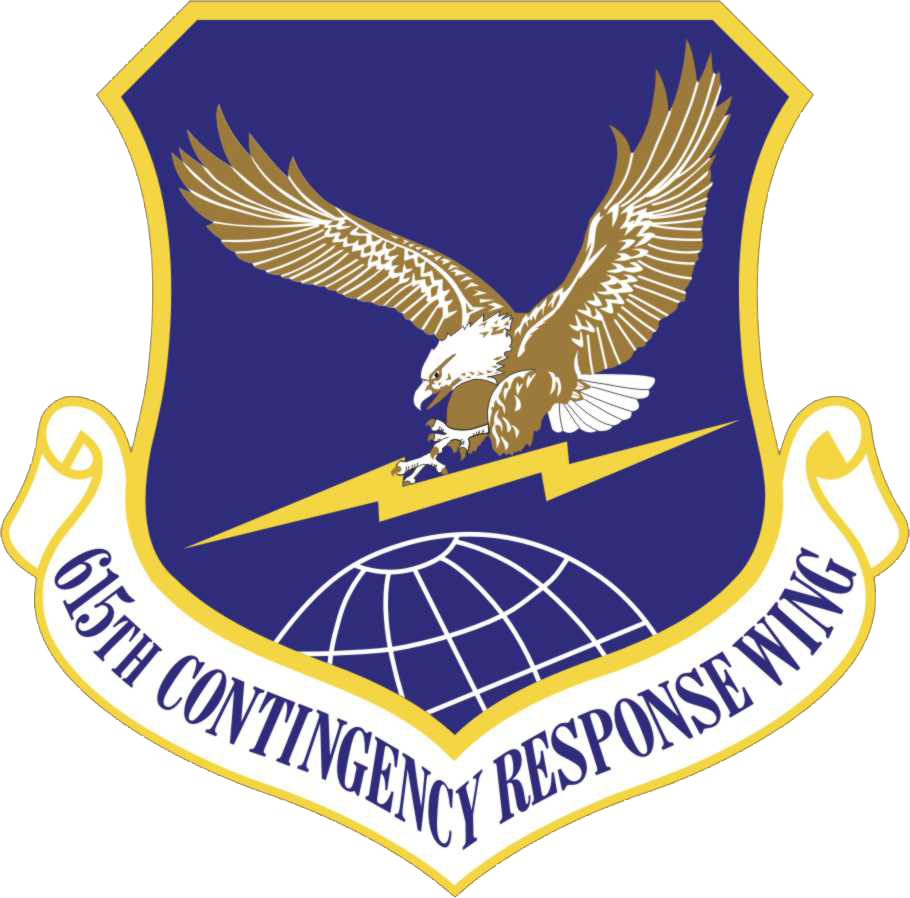
- 615th Contingency Response Wing emblem

The 615th Contingency Response Wing was one of two contingency response wings assigned to Air Mobility Command of the United States Air Force. The wing was headquartered at Travis Air Force Base, California. Its primary mission was to employ rapidly deployable cross-functional teams to open forward airbases in an expeditionary environment. The wing reported to the United States Air Force Expeditionary Center when it was inactivated in May 2012.

== Mission ==
"The 615th Contingency Response Wing [was] one of two Contingency Response Wings assigned to the Air Force’s Air Mobility Command. Headquartered at Travis Air Force Base, California, the [wing]'s primary mission [was] to employ rapidly deployable cross-functional teams to quickly open forward airbases in an expeditionary environment to meet combatant commanders' needs. The 615th report[ed] to the 15th Expeditionary Mobility Task Force at Travis."

The 615th opened forward bases and extends existing Air Mobility Command infrastructure via its forward deployment capabilities, and provided core airbase operating forces to combatant commanders to meet the United States' national security requirements. The wing employed mission-ready airfield assessment teams, airfield operations, command and control, aerial port, and aircraft maintenance personnel, as well as airlift, weather, medical, intelligence, air traffic control, security forces, finance, fuels, supply and contracting personnel to project and sustain forces worldwide.

With an assigned military and civilian work force of more than 650 personnel in May 2005, the wing was composed of three contingency response groups, a global support squadron and a command staff. The wing commander could deploy as the director of mobility forces, a joint task Force commander, or a joint forces air component commander to establish air mobility operations in support of contingency efforts, humanitarian operations and combined, joint, and Air Force exercises.

== History ==
In 2011, the 615th opened an air base for the first time at an undisclosed location in Southwest Asia. The base was previously closed. Previous operations of the wing had been humanitarian relief missions or opening ports for joint task forces.

The wing was inactivated in a ceremony held on 29 May 2012. Command of its contingency response and operations support groups was transferred to the 621st Contingency Response Wing at Joint Base McGuire-Dix-Lakehurst in New Jersey.

== Lineage ==
- Constituted as the 615th Air Mobility Operations Group

Activated on 22 July 1994
Redesignated 615th Contingency Response Wing on 11 April 2005
Inactivated on 31 May 2012

=== Assignments ===
- Fifteenth Air Force (later 15th Air Mobility Task Force), 22 July 1994
- United States Air Force Expeditionary Center, 20 March 2012 – 31 May 2012

=== Components ===
Groups

- 570th Contingency Response Group, 11 April 2005 – 31 May 2012
- 571st Contingency Response Group, 11 April 2005 – 31 May 2012
- 572d Contingency Response Group, 11 April 2005 – 15 June 2010
- 615th Contingency Response Operations Group, 11 April 2005 – 15 June 2010

Squadrons

- 615th Aerial Port Squadron, c. 22 July 1994 – c. 1 May 1997
- 615th Air Mobility Squadron, c. 22 July 1994 – 15 June 2005
- 615th Air Mobility Control Squadron, c. 22 July 1994 – c. 1 May 1997
- 615th Air Mobility Operations Squadron, 22 July 1994 – 11 April 2005
- 632d Air Mobility Support Squadron, 22 July 1994 – 15 March 2001

Elmendorf Air Force Base, Alaska

- 633d Air Mobility Support Squadron, by 1996 – 15 March 2001

Kadena Air Base, Okinawa

- 634th Air Mobility Support Squadron, by 1996 – 15 March 2001

Andersen Air Force Base, Guam

=== Stations ===
- Travis Air Force Base, California, 22 July 1994 – 31 May 2012

== See also ==
- List of inactive AFCON wings of the United States Air Force
