= 672 (disambiguation) =

672 may refer to:

- 672, a calendar year

== Astronomy ==
- 672 Astarte, is a minor planet orbiting the Sun
- NGC 672, galaxy in the constellation Triangulum

== Military ==
- German submarine U-672, Nazi's World War II submarine
- 672d Aircraft Control and Warning Squadron, inactive United States Air Force unit
- 672d Bombardment Squadron, inactive United States Air Force unit
- 672d Strategic Missile Squadron, inactive United States Air Force unit
- 672d Technical Training Squadron, inactive United States Air Force unit

== Music ==
- "672", a song by The Dresden Dolls

== Other uses ==
- Area code 250#672. serves parts of British Columbia, Canada, and Alaska, USA
- 672 (number), a natural number
