= 961st Airborne Air Control Squadron =

961st Airborne Air Control Squadron

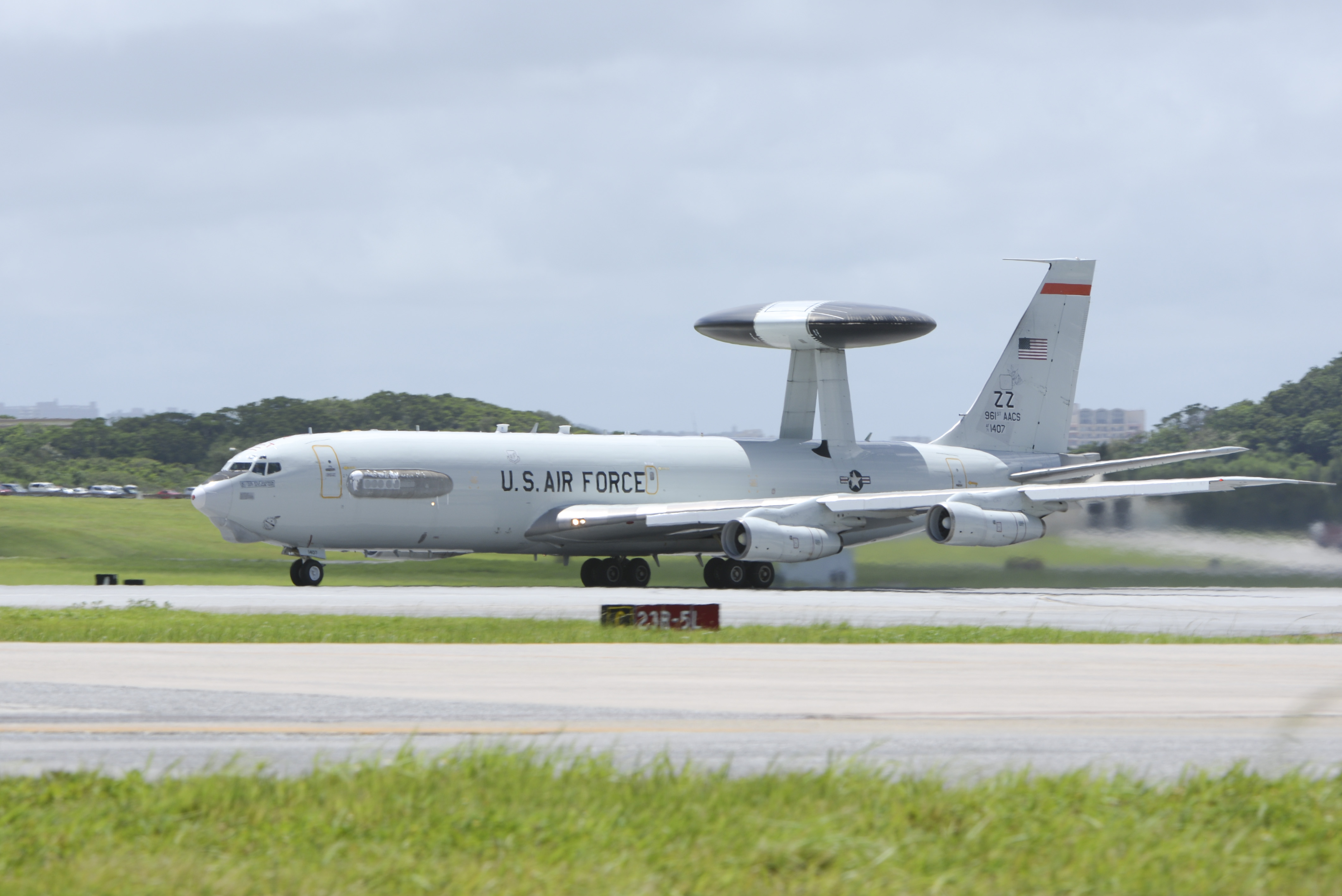
- Squadron E-3 Sentry at Kadena AB
- Active: 1941-1945; 1954-1969; 1979-Present
- Country: United States
- Branch: United States Air Force
- Role: Airborne Command and Control
- Part of: Pacific Air Forces
- Garrison/HQ: Kadena Air Base, Okinawa
- Engagements: Pacific Ocean Theater
- Decorations: Distinguished Unit Citation; Air Force Outstanding Unit Award

Commanders
- Notable commanders: William Crumm; Caleb Lutter

Insignia
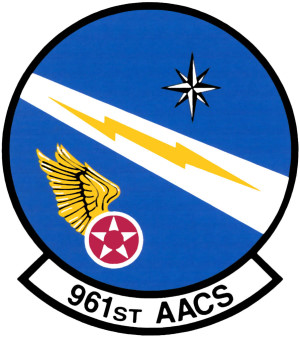
- 961st Airborne Air Control Squadron emblem 1995-present

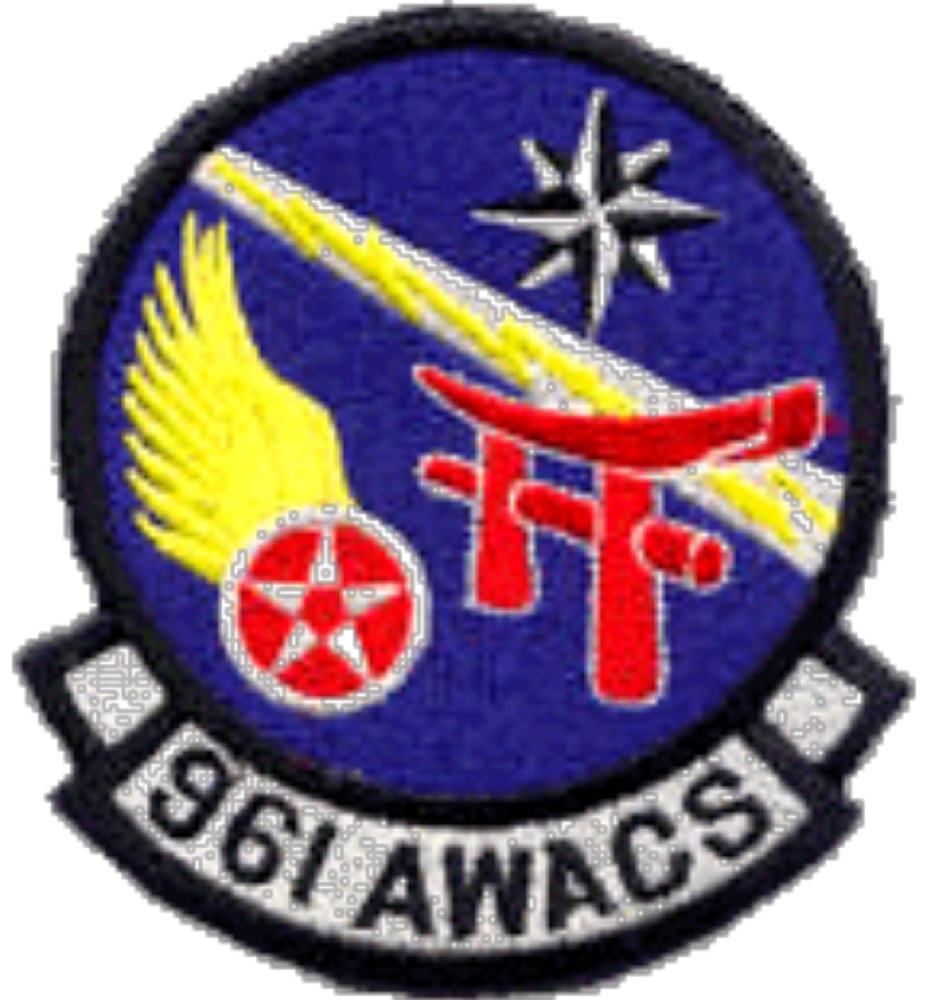
- 961st Airborne Air Control Squadron emblem 1981-1995 (Note: Approved 2 March 1981, modified 7 November 1995.)

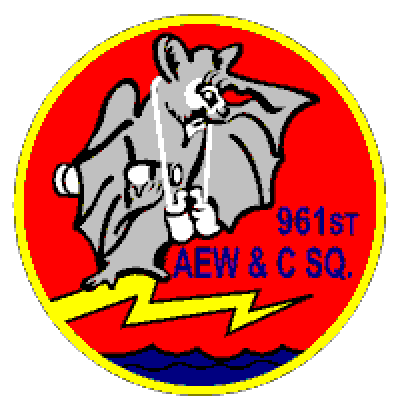
- 961st Airborne Early Warning & Control Sq emblem

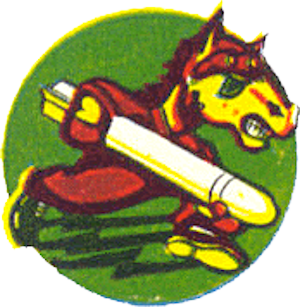
- 61st Bombardment Squadron emblem (Note: Approved 15 May 1942. Description: On an emerald green disc a caricatured horse yellow, outlined in black, trimmed in brown, wearing coveralls, aviator's helmet and goggles of brown, shoes black, trimmed in yellow, with three zigzag speed lines of black issuing from left foot, carrying under his right arm a white aerial bomb outlined in black, shaded in yellow.)

The 961st Airborne Air Control Squadron is part of the 18th Wing at Kadena Air Base, Japan. It operates the E-3 Sentry aircraft conducting airborne command and control missions.

== Mission ==
Provide airborne command and control, long-range surveillance, detection and identification information for commanders in support of U.S. goals.

== History ==
=== World War II ===
==== Organization and crew training ====
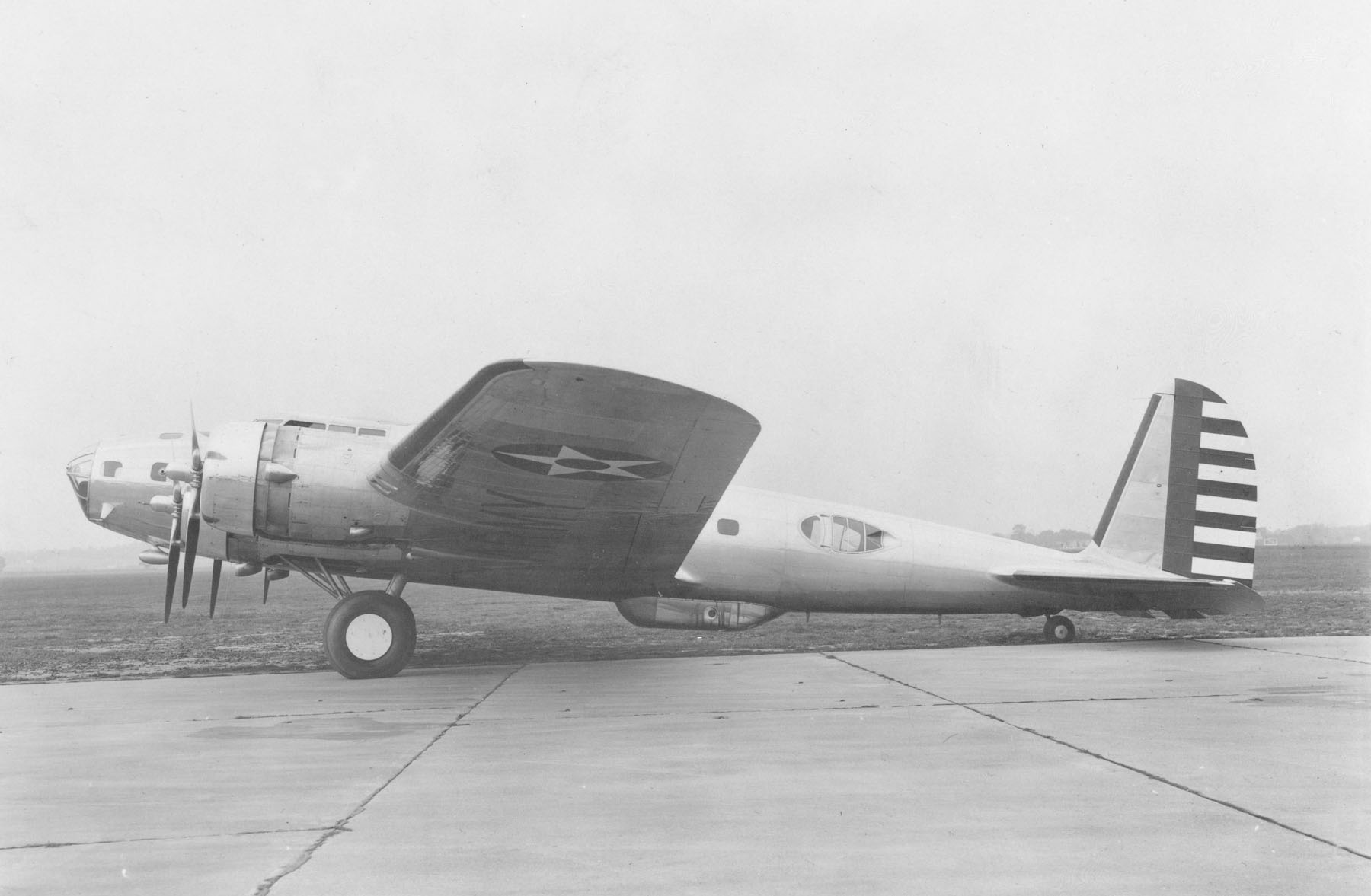
Boeing B-17C

The first predecessor of the squadron was initially activated at Fort Douglas, Utah in January 1941 as the 61st Bombardment Squadron, one of the three original bombardment squadrons of the 39th Bombardment Group. (Note: The 39th Group also had an attached reconnaissance squadron. This soon became the fourth bombardment squadron of the group. Maurer, Combat Squadrons, pp. 491-492.) The squadron flew Boeing B-17 Flying Fortresses. While stationed at Fort Douglas, the squadron conducted flight operations from Salt Lake City Municipal Airport. In July 1941, the squadron moved with the 39th Group to Geiger Field, Washington.

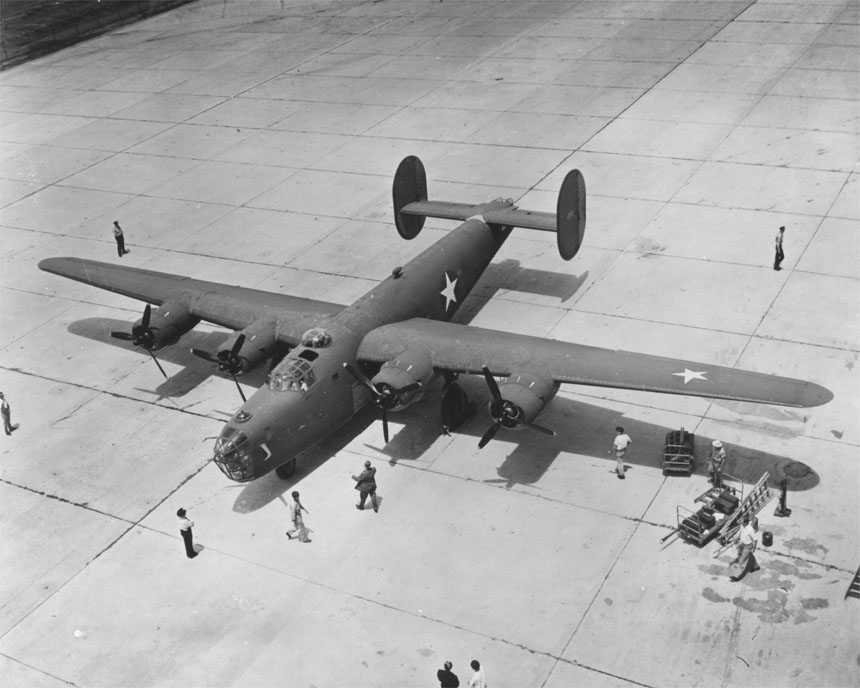
Consolidated B-24E

Following the Attack on Pearl Harbor, the squadron flew antisubmarine patrols off the Pacific Coast until February 1942, when it moved to Davis-Monthan Field, Arizona. At Davis-Monthan, it converted to Consolidated B-24 Liberators. With its Liberators, the squadron became an Operational Training Unit (OTU). The OTU program involved the use of an oversized parent unit to provide cadres to "satellite groups" It then assumed responsibility for their training and oversaw their expansion with graduates of Army Air Forces Training Command schools to become effective combat units. The OTU program was patterned after the unit training system of the Royal Air Force. Phase I training concentrated on individual training in crewmember specialties. Phase II training emphasized the coordination for the crew to act as a team. The final phase concentrated on operation as a unit.

By late 1943 most of the Army Air Forces (AAF)'s units had been activated and almost three quarters of them had deployed overseas. With the exception of special programs, like forming Boeing B-29 Superfortress units, training “fillers” for existing units became more important than unit training. The squadron mission changed to that of a Replacement Training Unit (RTU). The RTU was also an oversized unit, but its mission was to train individual pilots or aircrews.

However, the AAF was finding that standard military units like the 61st, whose manning was based on relatively inflexible tables of organization were proving not well adapted to the training mission, even more so to the replacement mission. Accordingly, the Army Air Forces adopted a more functional system in which each base was organized into a separate numbered unit. Most of the OTUs and RTUs were inactivated or disbanded and training activities given to these base units. The 39th Group and its components were inactivated on 1 April 1944, and along with supporting units at Davis-Monthan, replaced by the 233rd AAF Base Unit (Combat Crew Training School, Bombardment, Heavy).

==== B-29 Superfortress operations against Japan ====
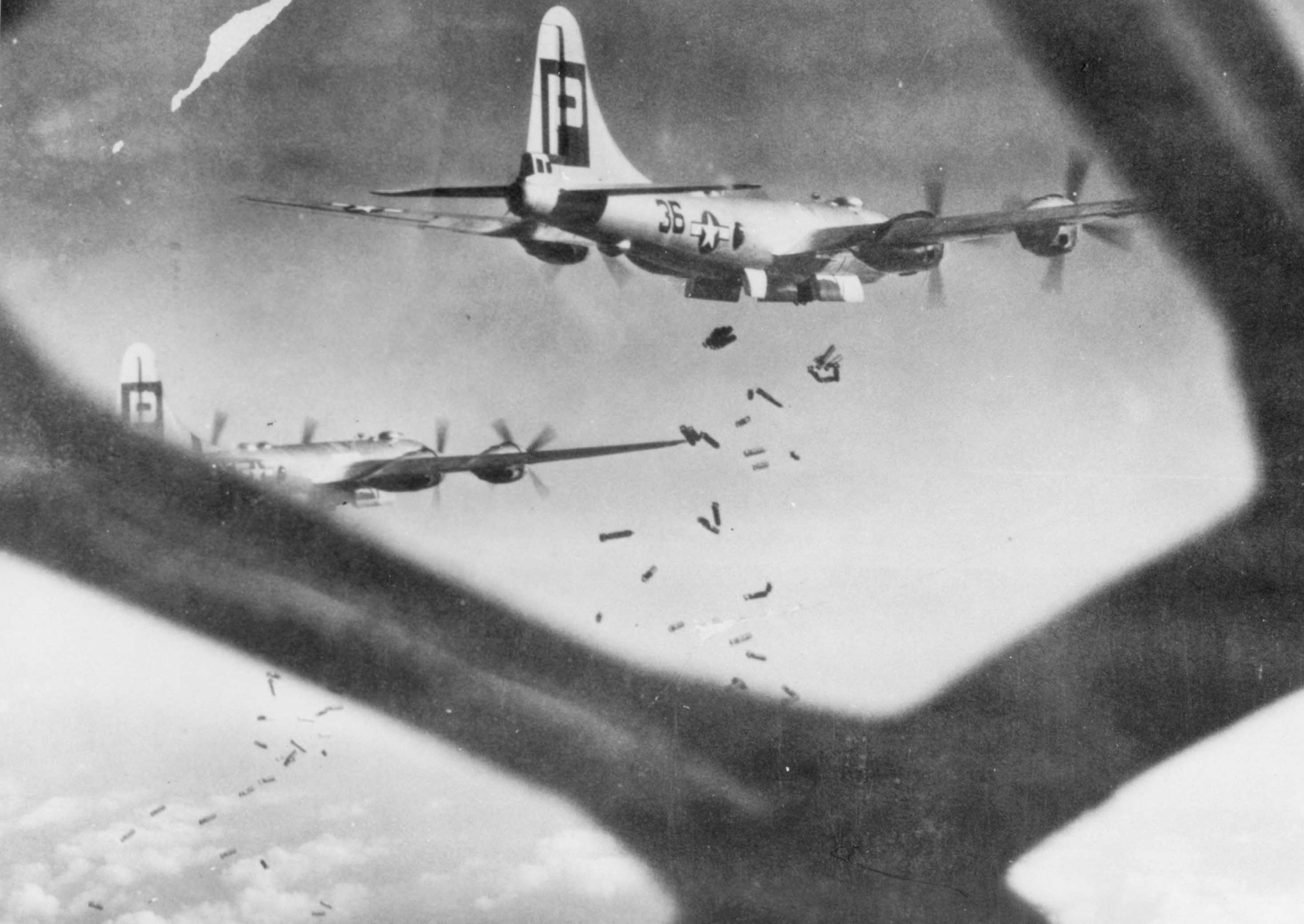
39th Bombardment Group B-29s bombing Japan

The squadron was activated again the same day as a Boeing B-29 Superfortress very heavy bombardment squadron. When training was completed moved to North Field Guam in the Mariana Islands of the Central Pacific Area in January 1945 and assigned to XXI Bomber Command, Twentieth Air Force. Its mission was the strategic bombardment of the Japanese Home Islands and the destruction of its war-making capability.

Flew "shakedown" missions against Japanese targets on Moen Island, Truk, and other points in the Carolines and Marianas. The squadron began combat missions over Japan on 25 February 1945 with a firebombing mission over Northeast Tokyo. The squadron continued to participate in wide area firebombing attack, but the first ten-day blitz resulting in the Army Air Forces running out of incendiary bombs. Until then the squadron flew conventional strategic bombing missions using high explosive bombs.

The squadron continued attacking urban areas with incendiary raids until the end of the war in August 1945, attacking major Japanese cities, causing massive destruction of urbanized areas. Also conducted raids against strategic objectives, bombing aircraft factories, chemical plants, oil refineries, and other targets in Japan. The squadron flew its last combat missions on 14 August when hostilities ended. Afterwards, its B 29s carried relief supplies to Allied prisoner of war camps in Japan and Manchuria

Squadron remained in Western Pacific, although largely demobilized in the fall of 1945. Some aircraft scrapped on Tinian; others flown to storage depots in the United States. Inactivated as part of Army Service forces at the end of 1945.

=== Cold War ===
The 961st flew radar surveillance missions along East Coast of the United States from, 18 December 1954 – 31 December 1969. The squadron assisted with the coverage of salvage operations of downed Korean Air Lines Flight 007, 1 –10 September 1983. It has served as the airborne command and control for the commander, United States Pacific Command and supported US forces counter air interdiction, close air support, search and rescue, reconnaissance, and airlift operations since 1980.

=== Operations ===
- World War II
- Combat Operations: Conducted bombardment missions against Japan, c. 6 Apr-14 Aug 1945.
- Campaigns: World War II: Western Pacific; Air Offensive, Japan.
- Decorations: Distinguished Unit Citations: Japan, 10 May 1945; Tokyo and Yokohama, Japan, 23–29 May 1945.

== Lineage ==
61st Bombardment Squadron'

- Constituted as the 61st Bombardment Squadron (Heavy) on 20 November 1940

Activated on 15 January 1941
Inactivated on 1 April 1944

- Redesignated 61st Bombardment Squadron, Very Heavy and activated on 1 April 1944

Inactivated on 27 December 1945

- Consolidated with the 961st Airborne Warning and Control Squadron as the 961st Airborne Warning and Control Squadron on 19 September 1985

961st Airborne Air Control Squadron

- Constituted as the 961st Airborne Early Warning and Control Squadron on 11 October 1954

Activated on 18 December 1954
Inactivated on 31 December 1969

- Redesignated 961st Airborne Warning and Control Support Squadron on 31 December 1979 [sic]

Activated on 1 October 1979
Redesignated 961st Airborne Warning and Control Squadron on 1 January 1982 (1982–1994)
Redesignated 961st Airborne Air Control Squadron on 1 August 1994 (1994–Present)

=== Assignments ===
- 39th Bombardment Group, 15 January 1941 – 1 April 1944
- 39th Bombardment Group, 1 April 1944 – 27 December 1945
- 551st Airborne Early Warning and Control Wing, 18 December 1954 – 31 December 1969
- 552d Airborne Warning and Control Wing (later 552d Airborne Warning and Control Division), 1 October 1979
- 28th Air Division, 1 April 1985
- 313th Air Division< 1 October 1990 (attached to Fifth Air Force for operations)
- 18th Operations Group 1 October 1991 – present)

=== Stations ===
- Fort Douglas, Utah, 15 Jan 1941
- Geiger Field, Washington, 2 Jul 1941
- Davis-Monthan Field, Arizona, 5 Feb 1942-1 Apr 1944
- Smoky Hill Army Air Field, Kansas, 1 Apr 1944
- Dalhart Army Air Field, Texas, 27 May 1944
- Smoky Hill Army Air Field, Kansas, 17 July 1944 - 8 January 1945
- North Field, Guam, Northern Mariana Islands, 18 February 1945 - 16 November 1945
- Camp Anza, California, 15 December 1945 - 27 December 1945
- Otis Air Force Base, Massachusetts, 18 December 1954 – 31 December 1969
- Kadena Air Base, Okinawa, Japan, 1 October 1979 – present)

== Aircraft ==
- Boeing B-17 Flying Fortress (1941–1942)
- Consolidated B-24 Liberator (1942–1944)
- Boeing B-29 Superfortress (1944–1945)
- Lockheed EC-121 Warning Star (1955–1969)
- Boeing E-3 Sentry (1979–present)
