= 705th Strategic Missile Wing =

705th Strategic Missile Wing Later 510th Tactical Missile Wing
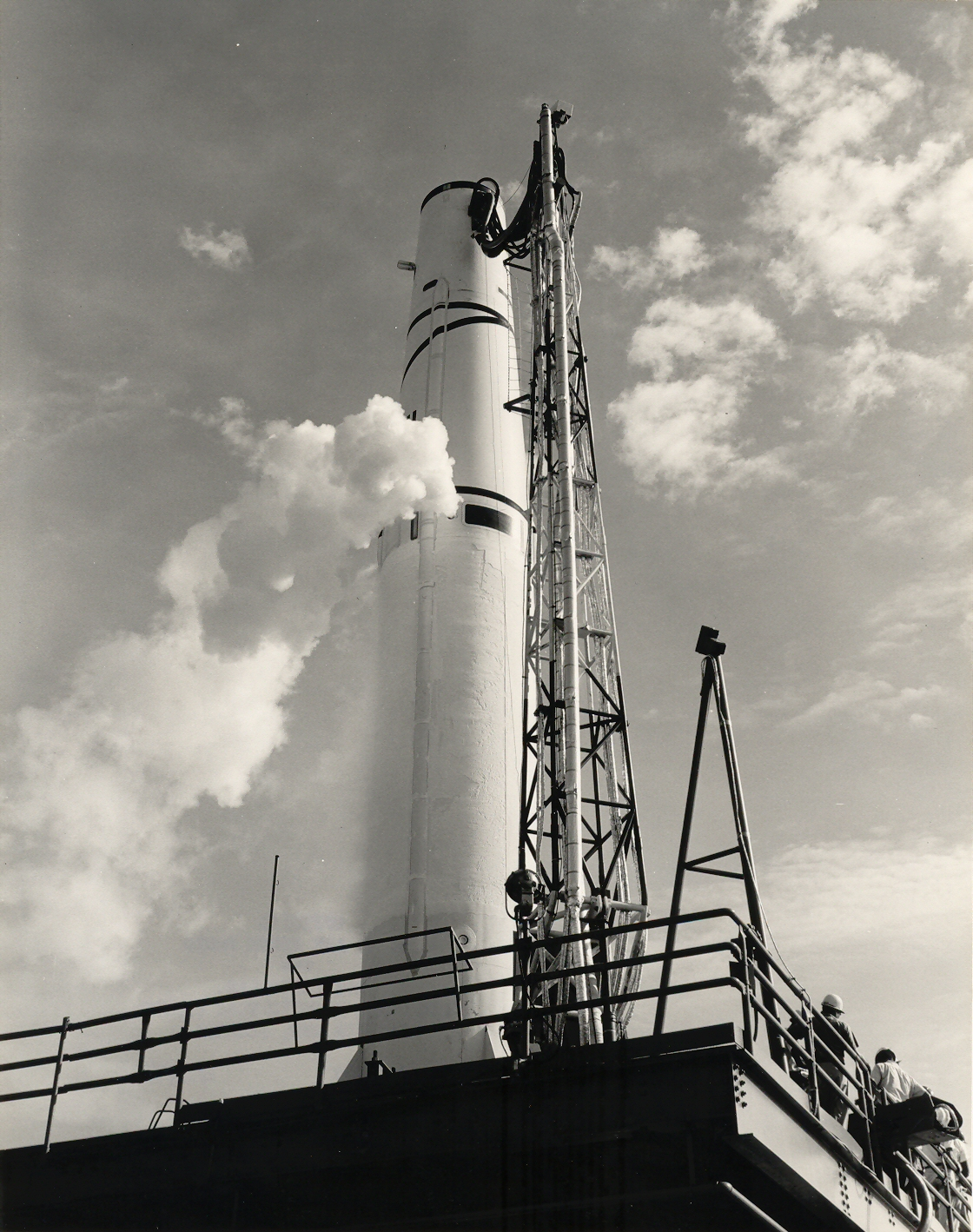
- Active: 1943–1944; 1958–1960
- Country: United States
- Branch: United States Air Force
- Role: intermediate range ballistic missile training
- Size: wing

The wing's first predecessor is the 5th Combat Crew Replacement Center Group, a former Army Air Forces unit. This group was activated in England during World War II and trained replacement crews for Eighth Air Force until it was disbanded in 1944.

The second predecessor of the wing is the 705th Strategic Missile Wing, an inactive United States Air Force unit. It was last assigned as an active unit to the 7th Air Division at South Ruislip Air Station, England, where it was discontinued on 1 April 1960. The wing was formed to train Royal Air Force operations and maintenance personnel on the SM-75 Thor intermediate range ballistic missile.

In July 1985 the two units were consolidated as the 510th Tactical Missile Wing. However, the consolidated unit has remained inactive.

== History ==
=== Bomber crew training ===
The Wing's first predecessor is the 5th Combat Crew Replacement Center Group, which was organized under VIII Composite Command at High Wycombe, England, the headquarters of VII Bomber Command on 5 November 1943. The following February, it moved to RAF Cheddington, England, with the mission of training newly arriving replacement bomber crews. The group moved to RAF Greencastle, Northern Ireland, in July 1944, and was disbanded there on 5 August 1944.

=== Missile training ===
Strategic Air Command (SAC) activated the 705th Strategic Missile Wing on 20 February 1958 at RAF Lakenheath, England, to monitor the PGM-17 Thor IRBM program in the United Kingdom and provide technical assistance to the four Royal Air Force Thor squadrons. The wing never became operational, and its only manning was by additional duty personnel of the 7th Air Division Directorate of Ballistic Missiles and six weeks after activation, the wing moved to South Ruislip Air Station, the division's station, where it remained through 1960. Even its commanding officer, Col. William R. Yancy acted in that capacity as an additional duty from March to November 1958,

The wing's 672d Technical Training Squadron was located at RAF Feltwell, where, on 22 June 1959, No. 77 Squadron RAF became the first British-based Thor squadron to reach operational status. The 672d moved to RAF Lakenheath, from which location it trained the remaining three RAF missile squadrons. On 11 September and 22 December 1959, the second and third British-based Thor squadrons were declared operational and assigned to Royal Air Force personnel. When SAC turned over the fourth and final British-based Thor to the Royal Air Force on 22 April 1960, the deployment of the Thor IRBM weapon system in the United Kingdom was completed. The wing was inactivated on 1 April 1960, followed shortly by the elimination of 7th Air Division's Directorate of Ballistic Missiles.

While the missiles were assigned to the RAF for control, SAC retained control over the squadron's nuclear warheads and assigned detachments of the attached 99th Aviation Depot Squadron with each RAF missile squadron to maintain custody and control over, and maintain reentry vehicles and warheads until it received U. S. warhead release orders. It also operated USAF communications facilities and trained Royal Air Force personnel on Thor missile operations.

== Lineage ==
5th Combat Crew Replacement Center Group

- Constituted as the 5th Combat Crew Replacement Center Group

Activated on 3 November 1943
Disbanded on 5 August 1944

- Reconstituted on 31 July 1985 and consolidated with the 705th Strategic Missile Wing as the 510th Tactical Missile Wing

705th Strategic Missile Wing

- Constituted as the 705th Strategic Missile Wing on 6 February 1958

Activated on 20 February 1958
Redesignated 705th Strategic Missile Wing (IRBM-Thor) on 1 April 1958
Discontinued on 1 April 1960

- Consolidated with the 5th Combat Crew Replacement Center Group on 31 July 1985 as the 510th Tactical Missile Wing

510th Tactical Missile Wing

- 5th Combat Crew Replacement Center Group and 705th Strategic Missile Wing consolidated on 31 July 1985 as the 510th Tactical Missile Wing (remained inactive)

=== Assignments ===
- VIII Air Force Composite Command, 3 November 1943 – 5 August 1944
- 7th Air Division, 20 February 1958 – 1 April 1960
- Department of the Air Force, 1 April 1960 (Note: Although the 705th Wing was discontinued on this date, it was not inactivated. The wing was, therefore, technically assigned to the DAF until the distinction between inactivation and discontinuation ceased in 1969. The wing has not been active in fact since 1960.)

=== Components ===
- 5th Replacement & Training Squadron (Bombardment), 3 November 1943 – 5 August 1944
- 99th Aviation Depot Squadron 15 May 1958 – 1 April 1960 (attached from 7th Air Division)

RAF Lakenheath

- 672d Technical Training Squadron, 20 February 1956 – 1 October 1959

=== Stations ===
- High Wycombe, England, 5 November 1943
- RAF Cheddington, England, c. 24 February 1944
- RAF Greencastle, Northern Ireland, c. Jul 1944 – 5 August 1944
- RAF Lakenheath, England, 20 February 1958
- US Air Base South Ruislip (later, South Ruislip Air Station), England, 15 March 1958 – 1 April 1960

=== Missiles ===
- PGM-17 Thor

=== Supported RAF Missile Units ===
- No. 77 Squadron RAF – RAF Feltwell, United Kingdom
- No. 97 Squadron RAF – RAF Hemswell, United Kingdom
- No. 98 Squadron RAF – RAF Driffield, United Kingdom
- No. 144 Squadron RAF – RAF North Luffenham, United Kingdom
