= 469th Bombardment Group =

469th Bombardment Group (later 469th Electronic Warfare Group)
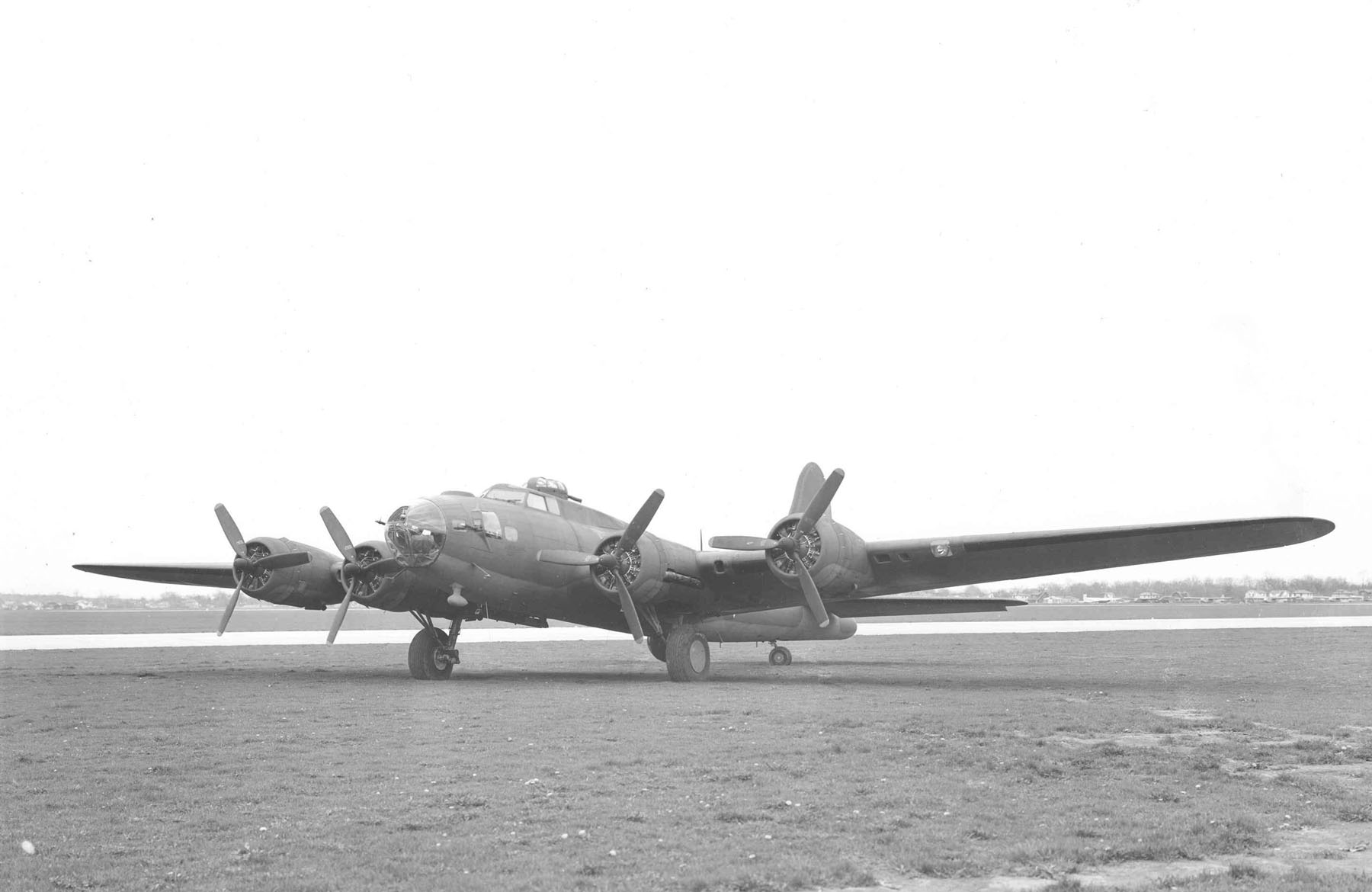
- B-17 Flying Fortress as flown by the group
- Active: 1943–1944
- Country: United States
- Branch: United States Air Force
- Role: Heavy bomber training

The 469th Bombardment Group is a former United States Army Air Forces (AAF) unit. It was activated in May 1943 and served as a Replacement Training Unit until it was disbanded in April 1944 when the AAF reorganized its training and support units in the United States.

== History ==
The 469th Bombardment Group was activated at Pueblo Army Air Base, Colorado on 1 May 1943, but within a week of activation, moved to Alexandria Army Air Base, Louisiana, changing places with the 471st Bombardment Group, which moved from Alexandria to Pueblo. (Note: Both units apparently existed only on paper at the time of the "move". See Maurer, Combat Units, pp. 344-345 (no unit commander until 7 May 1943).) The movement of the group followed the conversion of Alexandria from an air support training base to a heavy bomber training base and its transfer from Third to Second Air Force. At Alexandria, it served as a Replacement Training Unit for aircrews flying the Boeing B-17 Flying Fortress. Replacement Training Units were oversized units that trained individual pilots and aircrews. The group was composed of the 796th, 797th, 798th, and 799th Bombardment Squadrons. Training began once the group's first B-17 arrived at Alexandria on 1 June.

However, the Army Air Forces (AAF) was finding that standard military units like the 469th, which were assigned personnel and equipment based on relatively inflexible tables of organization were not proving well adapted to the training mission. In November 1943, most elements of the group were administratively organized as a "Combat Crew Training School". However this adjustment did not go far enough and in the spring of 1944, the AAF adopted a more functional system in which each base was organized into a separate numbered unit, which was manned and equipped based on the station's requirements. Accordingly, the 469th Group was disbanded, and along with its elements and supporting units at Alexandria was used to form the 221st AAF Base Unit.

The group was reconstituted in July 1985 as the 469th Electronic Warfare Group, but has not been active since.

== Lineage ==
- Constituted as the 469th Bombardment Group (Heavy)

Activated on 1 May 1943
Disbanded on 1 April 1944

- Reconstituted and redesignated 469th Electronic Warfare Group on 31 July 1985

=== Assignments ===
- 16th Bombardment Operational Training Wing, 1 May 1943 – 1 April 1944

=== Components ===
- 796th Bombardment Squadron: 1 May 1943 – 1 April 1944
- 797th Bombardment Squadron: 1 May 1943 – 1 April 1944
- 798th Bombardment Squadron: 1 May 1943 – 1 April 1944
- 799th Bombardment Squadron: 1 May 1943 – 1 April 1944

=== Stations ===
- Pueblo Army Air Base, Colorado, 1 May 1943
- Alexandria Army Air Base, Louisiana, 7 May 1943 – 1 April 1944

=== Aircraft ===
- Boeing B-17 Flying Fortress, 1943–1944
