= 34th Bomb Squadron =

US Air Force unit

34th Bomb Squadron

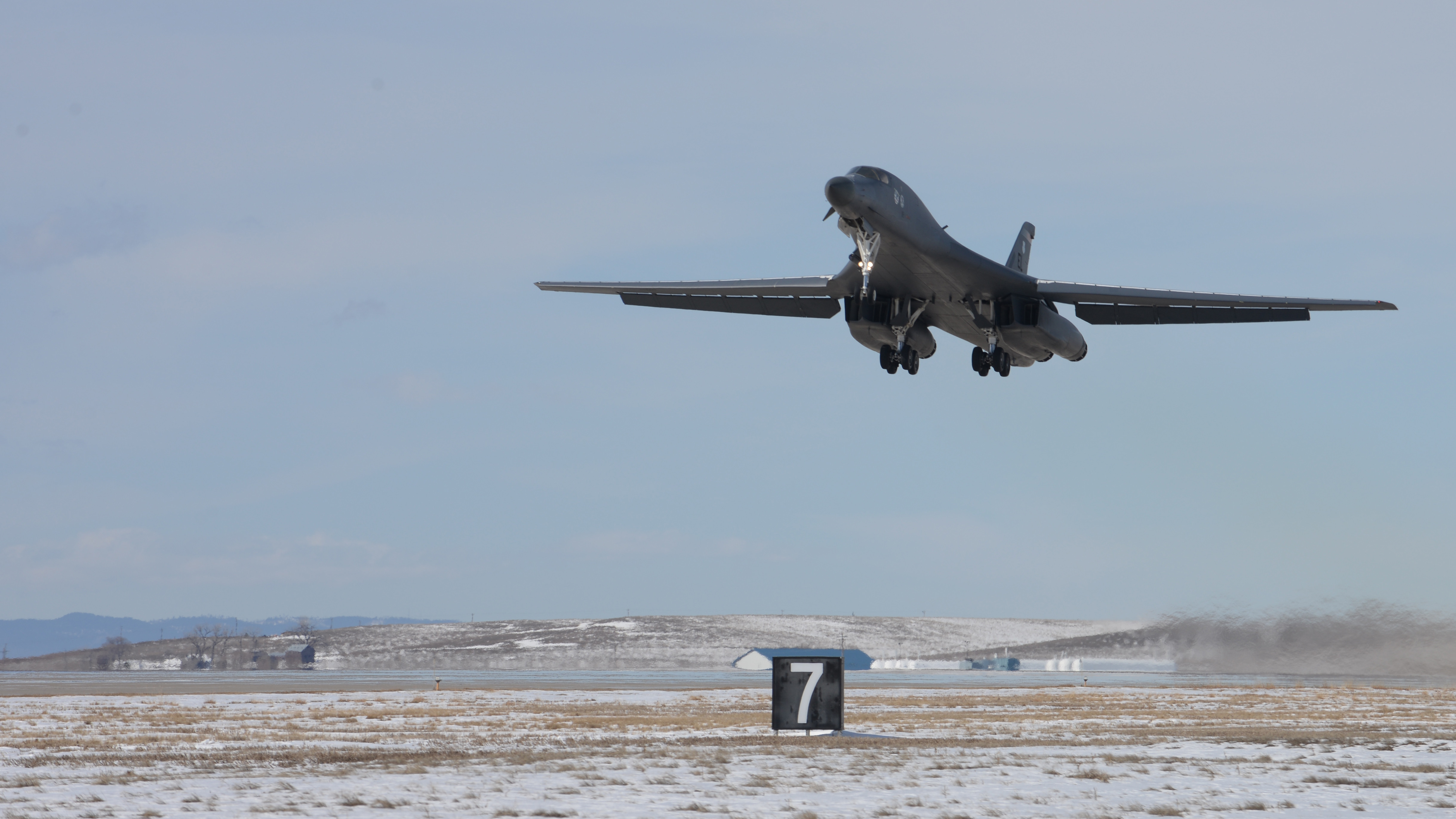
- A B-1 from the 34th Bomb Squadron, takes off from Ellsworth Air Force Base on 21 March 2018
- Active: 1917–1919; 1931–1945; 1947–1948; 1952–1958; 1962–1976; 1992–present
- Country: United States
- Branch: United States Air Force
- Role: Strategic Bombing
- Part of: Global Strike Command
- Garrison/HQ: Ellsworth Air Force Base
- Nicknames: Original Thunderbirds; World Famous Thunderbirds (Doolittle's Raiders)
- Colors: Red, Black
- Mascot: T-Bird
- Engagements: World War I World War II; Doolittle Raid; Korean War; Operation Enduring Freedom; Operation Iraqi Freedom; Operation Odyssey Dawn; Operation Freedom's Sentinel; Operation Inherent Resolve
- Decorations: Distinguished Unit Citation; Air Force Outstanding Unit Award; French Croix de Guerre with Palm; Republic of Korea Presidential Unit Citation

Commanders
- Notable commanders: Ira Eaker

Insignia
- 34th Bomb Squadron emblem (Note: Approved 18 June 1932. Description: On and over a plate a conventualized thunderbird displayed bendsinisterwise with lightning flashes emitting from eyes and on the breast an inverted pyramid bendsinisterwise of three steps divided palewise of seven white and red.)

The 34th Bomb Squadron is part of the 28th Bomb Wing at Ellsworth Air Force Base, South Dakota. It operates Rockwell B-1 Lancer aircraft providing strategic bombing capability.

== Overview ==
The 34th Bomb Squadron is presently the 4th-oldest active squadron in the United States Air Force, being formed on 10 May 1917, less than a month after the United States' entry into World War I. Members of the squadron participated in World War I, World War II, Korean War, Operation Enduring Freedom and Operation Iraqi Freedom.

Today, the 34th Bomb Squadron stands ready to provide combat-ready aircrews to project global power anytime in support of the Combatant Commander's objectives.

== History ==
=== World War I ===
The 34th Bomb Squadron can trace its origins to the organization of 2d Company H, Kelly Field, Texas which was organized on 10 May 1917. At the time Kelly Field consisted mostly of a field of cotton plants, as it was just obtained by the Army for the establishment of a training airfield, just to the south of San Antonio, Texas. When the first soldiers arrived, there were not any tents or cots for them so they slept on the ground. When the first tents arrived, they were assigned locations for them and they were pitched. A few days later, when the company received its full quota of men, it was changed to 1st Company G, Kelly Field. The men received their indoctrination into the Army as soldiers, standing guard duty and other rudimentary duties. The lack of sanitary facilities and also uniforms meant most men worked in the civilian clothing they arrived in and slept in them without bathing until latrines and washing facilities were constructed. The men dug ditches for water mains, erected wooden buildings for barracks and a large YMCA.

==== Across the Atlantic ====
On 15 July, the unit was redesignated as the 34th Provisional Squadron, and rumors began to circulate that the unit would be sent to Europe. On the 25th, it was again re-designated as the 34th Aero Squadron, and they were issued proper uniforms and began to be equipped for overseas duty. On 10 August, the squadron received orders to leave Kelly Field for transport to Hoboken, New Jersey the next day. Five days later, the squadron arrived at Fort Totten, New York. On the 22d they were transported to the Port of Entry, Hoboken, and were boarded on the RMS Baltic. The next day, they left Pier 59, en route to Halifax, Nova Scotia where the ship anchored awaiting for a convoy. Finally, on 5 September, the convoy was formed and the trans-Atlantic journey began.

On the night of 14 September, two red rockets were fired from an accompanying destroyer that had spotted a submarine periscope. The destroyer dropped depth charges on the submarine, and the Baltic made a sudden turn to port, that caused both men and anything loose aboard the ship to move. Suddenly a large explosion was heard and five long blasts were made by the ship's whistle and everyone on board was ordered to report to their assigned lifeboats. The Baltic's captain announced that a torpedo had struck the ship, but it had only made a glancing blow on the bow; that the emergency pumps were working and there was no danger.

==== Training in England ====
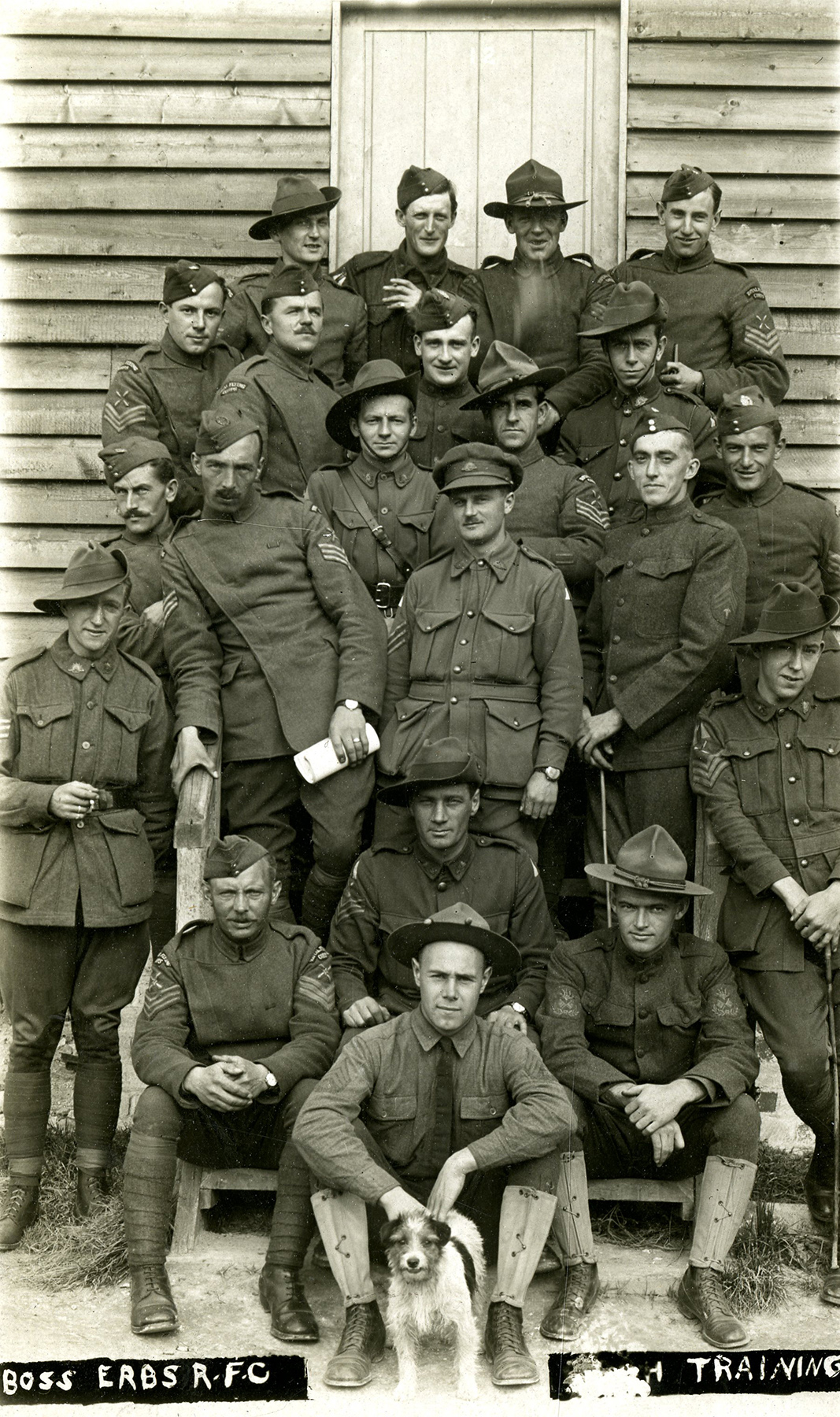
Edward Sloan, of the 34th Aero Squadron, in training with the Royal Flying Corps, Halton Camp, Wendover, England, September 1917

The next day the Baltic arrived at Liverpool, England where the squadron boarded a train for Southampton, arriving on 16 September. There, the squadron received orders that it would remain in England for training by the Royal Flying Corps. On the 20th the men (about 200 in all), were divided into groups and sent to schools to take training in the different types of work they would be expected to do. 75 men were sent to the machine-gun school in Grantham; the remainder sere sent to schools in Reading, Upaven Station, Wendover, Farnsborough, Halton, Pemlice and other RFC Stations. The 34th Aero Squadron was the first American unit to completely train in England.

==== 2d Aviation Instructional Center ====
After the detachments received their training, the squadron was re-assembled at Winchester for a final inspection. On 18 December, the squadron departed for France, arriving at the port of Le Havre on the 20th. After a few days wait in a "Rest Camp", they boarded a troop train for the city of Tours, arriving on the 23d. From there, the squadron marched to the American Second Aviation Instructional Center (2d AIC), at Tours Aerodrome, their assigned duty station in France on 23 December 1917.

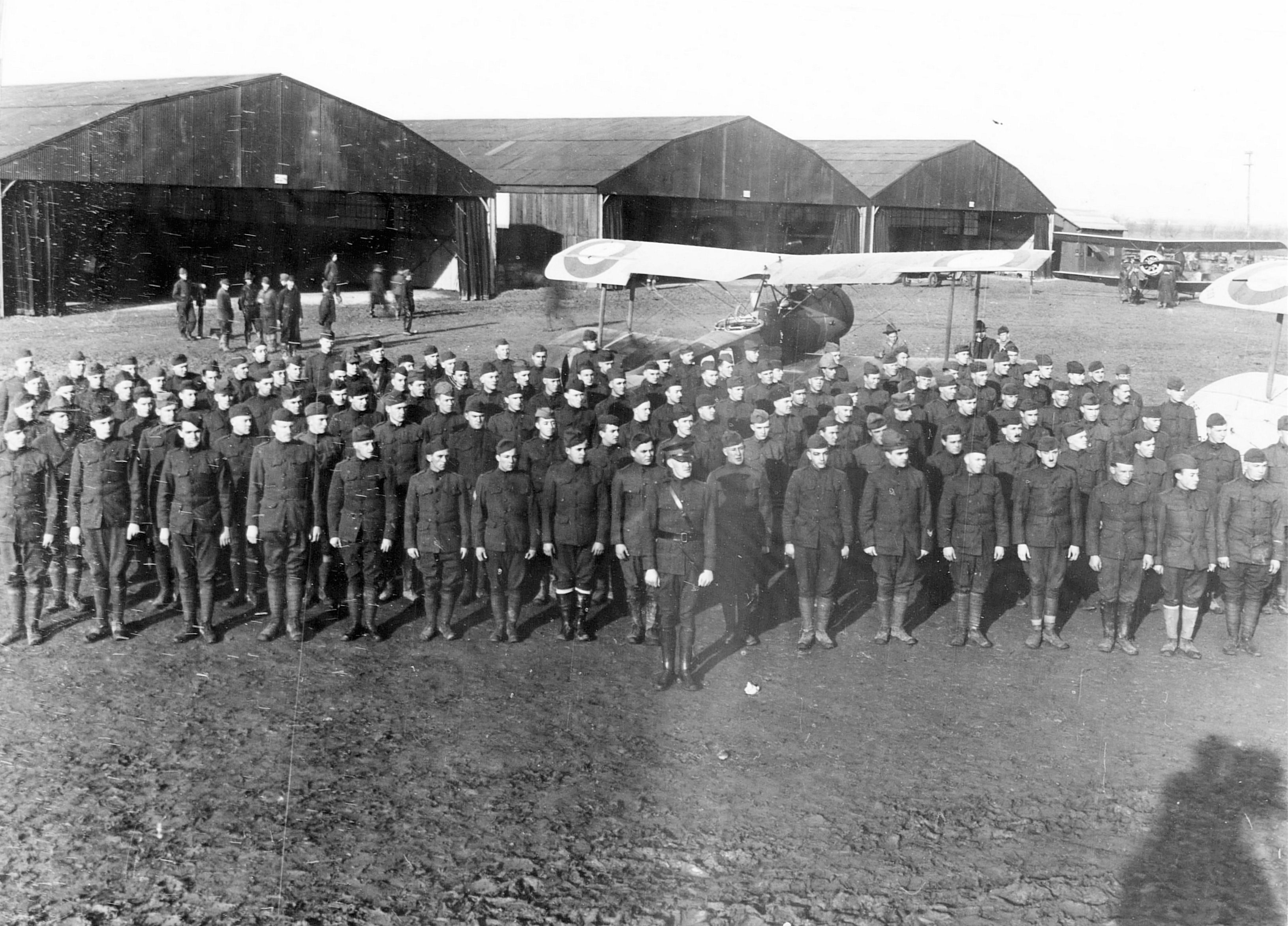
Men of the 34th Aero Squadron, 2d Air Instructional Center, Tours Aerodrome, France, November 1917. (Note: Several Salmson 2A2 reconnaissance aircraft are parked behind the formation.)

The 2d AIC was established by the Training Section, AEF to train aerial observers and observation pilots. The observer also manned two Lewis Machine Guns for defense. Several squadron members, who had been trained by the RFC in machine guns, started a machine gun school at the base. Other men were engaged in construction activities, putting up aircraft hangars and wooden buildings for all manner of uses from training classes to barracks. Men were assigned as mechanics to airplanes arriving at Tours, and others were used as instructors for the various classes that were organized at the base. In February, there was a general reorganization of the 2d AIC and about half the men of the 34th were transferred to other squadrons, and new men were transferred into the 34th. Many promotions were given to the senior members of the squadron who had arrived the previous December. Training was given to many members of the Corps Observation squadrons of the First Army Air Service as they arrived in France; and beginning in August 1918, new pilots and observers for the planned Second Army Air Service began to arrive for training.

By the time of the Armistice on 11 November, the men of the 34th Aero Squadron held about 75% of the responsible positions at the 2d AIC. Although they did not enter combat, the men trained the men who went to the front and gave them the best of training so they might accomplish their work.

==== Demobilization ====
The AEF was notoriously slow in returning men to the United States after the end of hostilities, and men who served on the front had priority over those who served in the rear areas. The 34th, therefore, remained at Tours until May 1919 when orders were received to proceed to the 1st Air Depot, Colombey-les-Belles Airdrome, France, for demobilization. From Colombey, the squadron was moved to a staging camp under the Services of Supply waiting for a date to report to a base port for transportation home. In mid-May, the squadron boarded a troop ship, arriving in New York on the 27th. From there, the 34th moved to Mitchel Field, New York where the men were demobilized and returned to civilian life.

=== Inter-war years ===
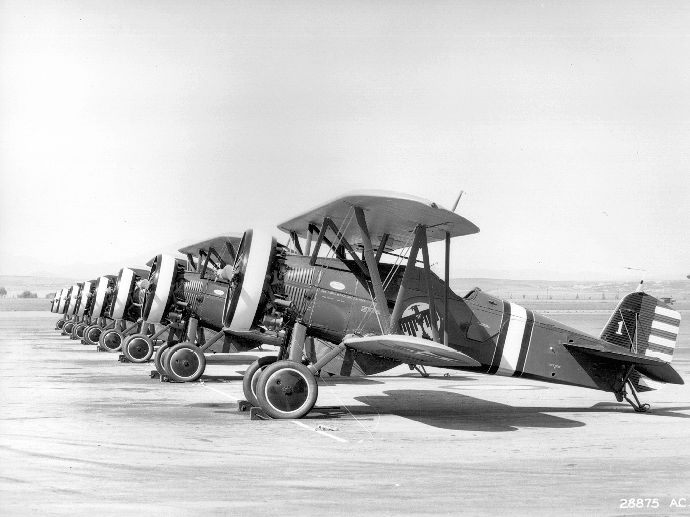
34h Pursuit Squadron Boeing P-12s at March Field, about 1932.

On 24 March 1923, the World War I 34th Aero Squadron was reconstituted into the permanent United States Army Air Service as the 34th Pursuit Squadron. The Army allotted the unit to the Sixth Corps Area, but it remained inactive, although nominally assigned to the inactive 8th Pursuit Group. Until 1927, its designated Active Associate Unit was the 27th Pursuit Squadron. In 1927 its allotted Corps Area became the Ninth Corps Area, and in 1928, the Eighth Corps Area. In 1929, it became a Regular Army Inactive unit, remaining inactive, but with reserve officers assigned. These officers participated in summer training exercises at Kelly Field between 1929 and 1931.

The 34th Pursuit Squadron was finally activated on 15 July 1931, at March Field, California, and assigned to the 17th Pursuit Group. In the early 1930s, the squadron flew Boeing P-12 and Boeing P-26 Peashooter pursuit aircraft. In 1935, it was redesignated the 34th Attack Squadron, assigned to the similarly redesignated 17th Attack Group. It continued to fly P-12s until it received its first Northrop A-17 attack dive bombers in July 1936. By 1939 the A-17 was considered obsolescent, and the squadron was re-equipped with the new Douglas B-18 Bolo medium bomber and redesignated the 34th Bombardment Squadron. The B-18s were soon replaced by Douglas B-23 Dragons.

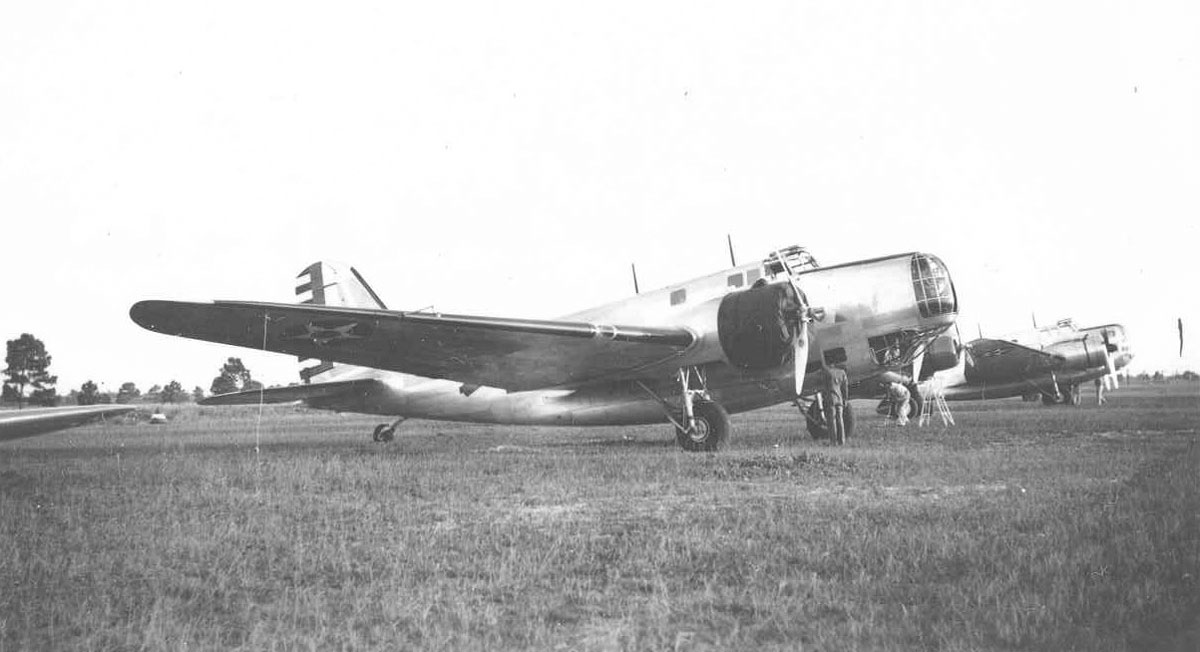
Douglas B-18s as flown by the squadron

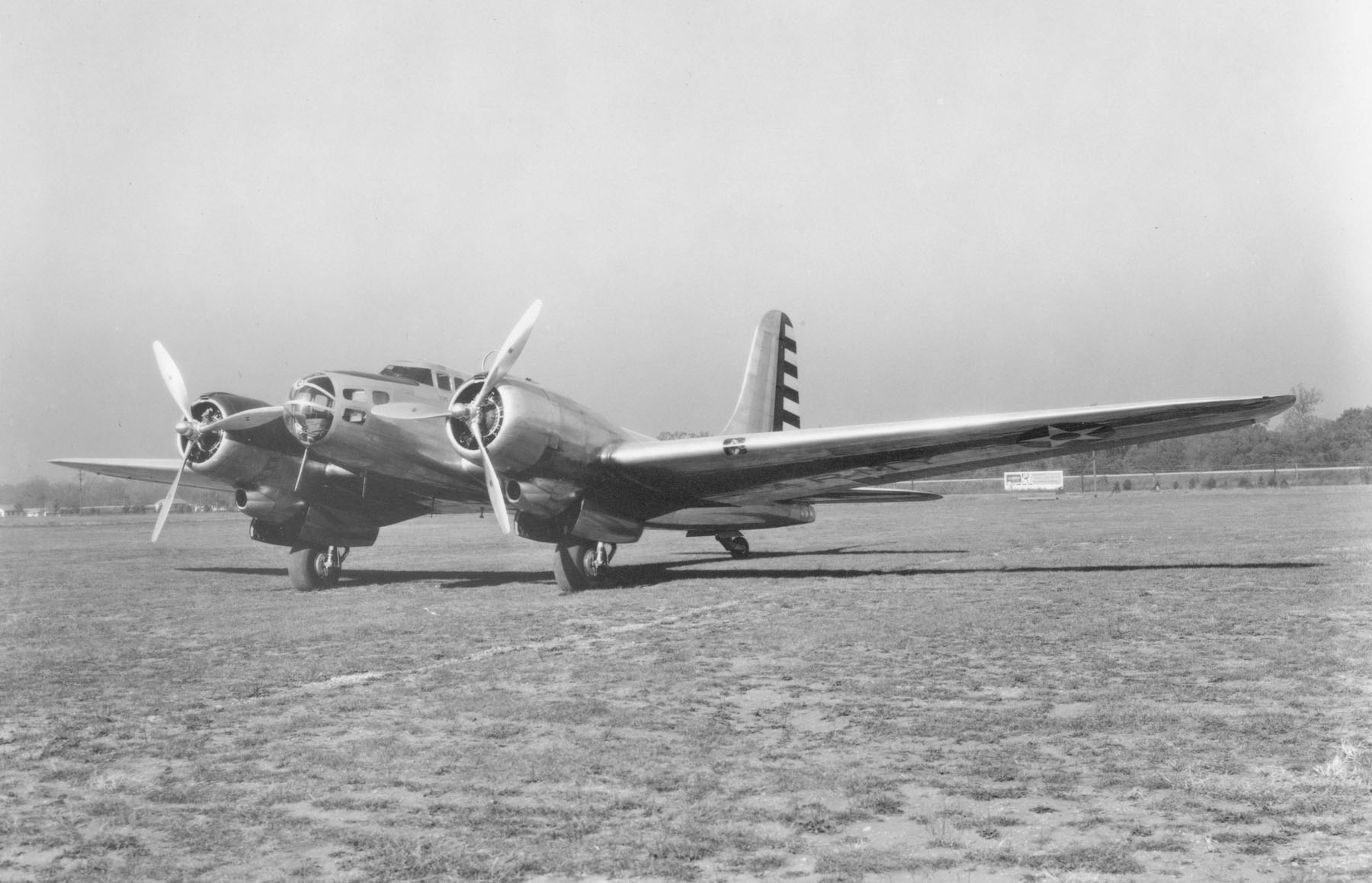
Douglas B-23 Dragon, which replaced the B-18

In June 1940 the squadron moved to McChord Field, Washington. The B-23 had a short life in front-line service, and the 34th was re-equipped with the new North American B-25 Mitchell medium bomber in February 1941, when the 17th Group became the first Air Corps unit to receive the new bomber. In June, the squadron moved to Pendleton Field, Oregon, as part of a dispersal plan by the Northwest Air District as part of the buildup of the Air Corps. In August, it received the updated B-25B, that had a much heavier defensive armament, dictated by the results of combat reports coming in from Europe.

=== World War II ===
==== Antisubmarine patrols ====
In the immediate aftermath of the Pearl Harbor Attack, the 34th flew anti-submarine warfare patrols in the Pacific Northwest from 22 December 1941 to c. March 1942. It moved to Lexington County Airport, South Carolina, on 9 February 1942 in order to meet the greater threat from German submarines operating off the East Coast.

==== Doolittle raid ====
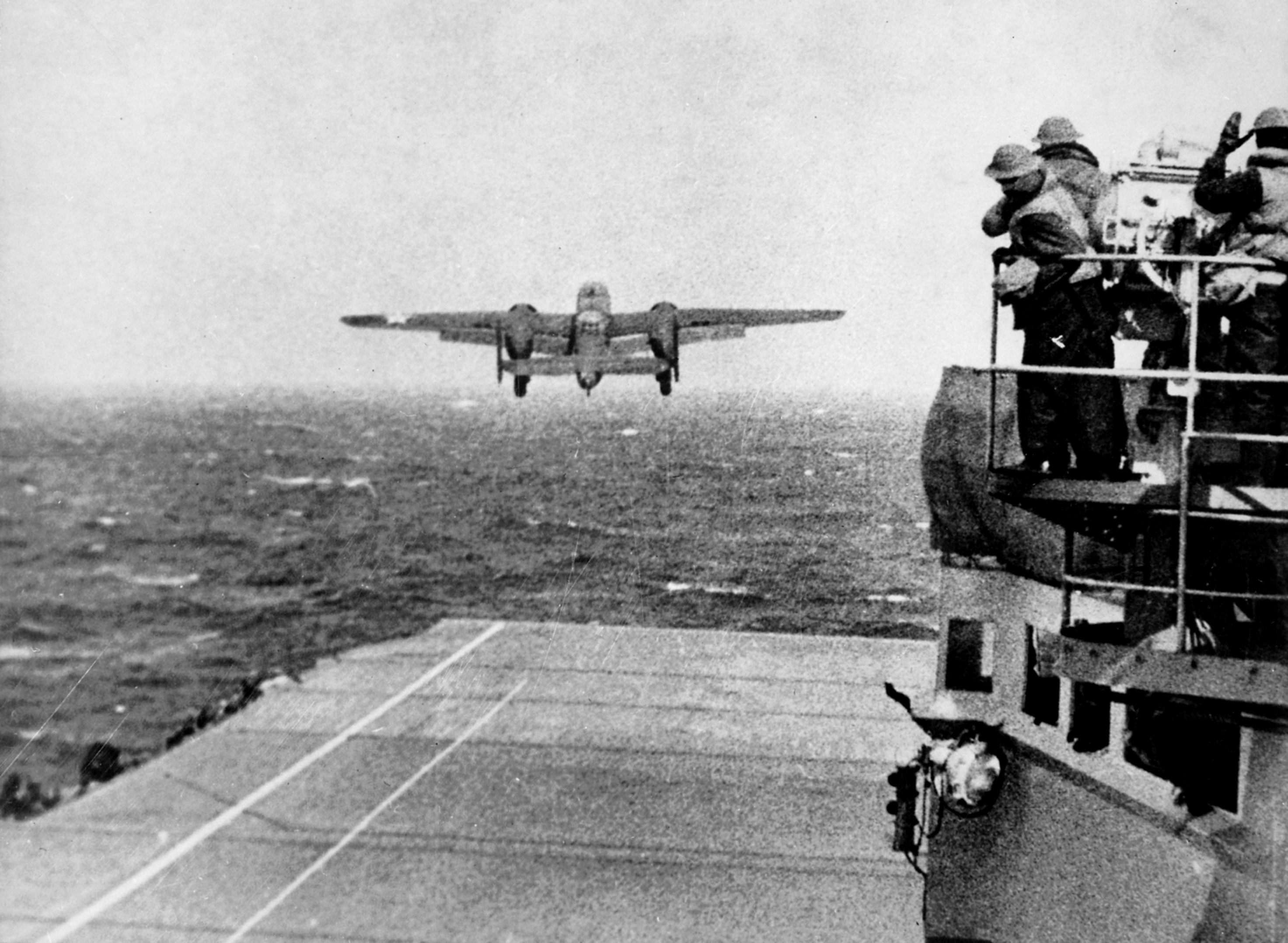
B-25 taking off for the Doolittle Raid

Planning for a retaliatory bombing raid on Japan began in December 1941, and twenty-four B-25Bs were diverted from the 17th Bombardment Group, which was the only B-25 unit in the Air Corps, and volunteers from its four squadrons, including the 34th, were recruited, the crews being told only that this was a secret and dangerous mission. The volunteers trained at Eglin Field, Florida. Upon completion of training, they left Eglin for McClellan Field, California for final modifications to the B-25s before moving to Naval Air Station Alameda, where the bombers were loaded on the USS Hornet (CV-8) for the raid.

==== Combat in the Mediterranean ====
The remainder of the squadron remained in Columbia, flying antisubmarine patrols until 23 June when it moved to Barksdale Field, Louisiana. There, the squadron re-equipped with the Martin B-26 Marauder, and began transition training under Third Air Force.

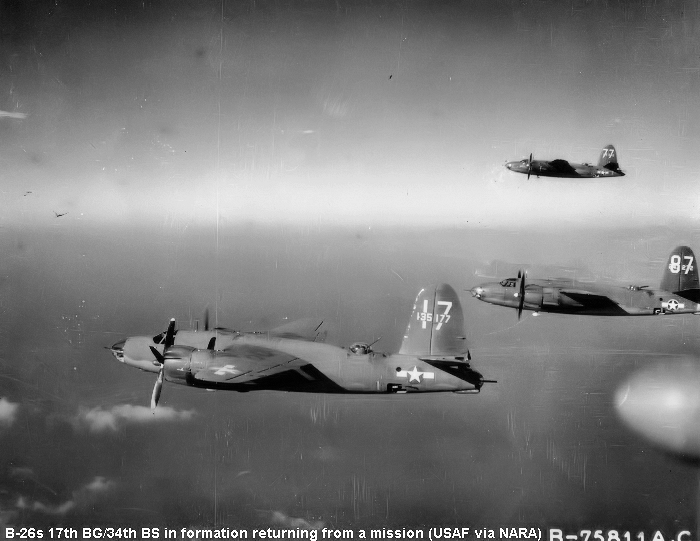
34th Bombardment Squadron Martin B-26 Marauders returning from a mission, about 1943 (Note: Martin B-26C-25-MO Marauder, serial 41-35177 is identifiable, flying on one engine over the Mediterranean. This plane was salvaged on 18 August 1945 due to damage from enemy action. Baugher, Joe (10 August 2023). "1941 USAF Serial Numbers". Joe Baugher.)

In November 1942, the squadron deployed to North Africa, arriving at Telergma Airport, Algeria in December 1942 following Operation Torch's initial landings, becoming part of XII Bomber Command. The squadron flew interdiction and close air support, bombing bridges, rail lines, marshalling yards, harbors, shipping, gun emplacements, troop concentrations and other enemy targets in Algeria and later Tunisia supporting American and later Allied ground forces as they moved east and participated in the Tunisian Campaign.

During 1943, the 34th participated in Operation Corkscrew, the reduction of Pantelleria. It supported Operation Husky, the Allied invasion of Sicily and Operation Avalanche, the invasion of Italy. During the drive toward Rome, the squadron was awarded a Distinguished Unit Citation for its attacks on airfields near Rome on 13 January 1944. It was also awarded the French Croix de Guerre with Palm for its operations in Italy between April and June.

The unit provided tactical air support in the liberation of Sardinia and Corsica. From airfields in Corsica, the 34th supported Allied ground forces during Operation Dragoon, the invasion of southern France in August 1944. It moved to Southern France and bombed enemy targets during the Allied drive northward. It earned a second Distinguished Unit Citation for bombing attacks on enemy defenses near Schweinfurt, Germany just before the end of the war on 10 April 1945.

The squadron remained in Europe after V-E Day. It became part of the occupation forces, and participated in the disarmament of Germany. It moved to the American Occupation Zone in Austria. The squadron returned to France to stage for its return to the United States, where it was inactivated in late November 1945.

=== Korean War ===
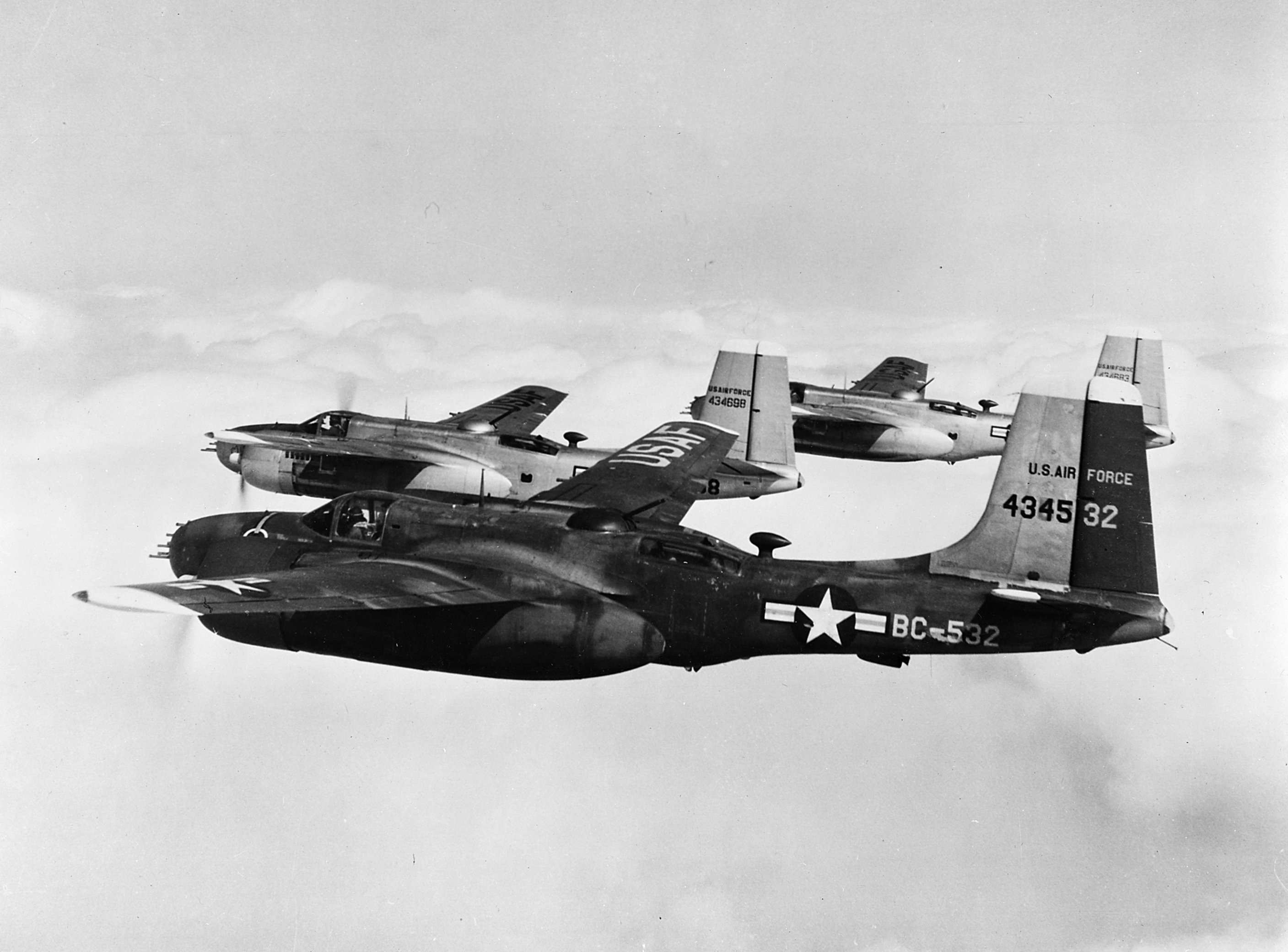
B-26B Invaders on a day interdiction mission over Korea.

The squadron was reactivated as part of the Tactical Air Command Ninth Air Force in 1947, and programmed as a Douglas A-26 Invader light bombardment squadron. Funding issues associated with the postwar Air Force meant that the "Attack Bomber" concept had to be shelved, with TAC's resources being put into jet fighters. In June 1948, the Attack designation category was officially eliminated and the aircraft was re-designated as the B-26. The B-26B and B-26Cs that were available were subsequently transferred to Air Force Reserve or Air National Guard units. Subsequently, the squadron was never manned or equipped and was inactivated in 1948.

When the North Korean army invaded the South on 25 June 1950, the USAF was critically short of light bombers. In particular, the 1054 B-26s that were still officially in the USAF inventory were mostly in reserve units or in storage in the southwest. To meet the emergency needs of the Korean War, the 452d Bombardment Group (Light), an Air Force Reserve unit out of Long Beach Airport, California, was called to active duty. When the 452d reached the end of its federalization period, the group was re-designated as the 17th Bombardment Group (Light) as part of Far East Air Forces, and the reserve 728th Bombardment Squadron inactivated and its mission, personnel and equipment were transferred to the 34th Bombardment Squadron at Pusan West Air Base, South Korea, on 10 May 1952. Reserve personnel were replaced by active duty personnel that had been trained on the B-26 at George Air Force Base, California, then deployed to South Korea.

During the conflict, the 17th and the 3d Bombardment Groups flew a total of 55,000 interdiction sorties throughout the war, at first in both day and night conditions and later almost exclusively at night. Attacks were carried out on Communist forces, primarily over South Korea, until the Korean War armistice.

=== Cold War ===
==== Tactical Air Command ====
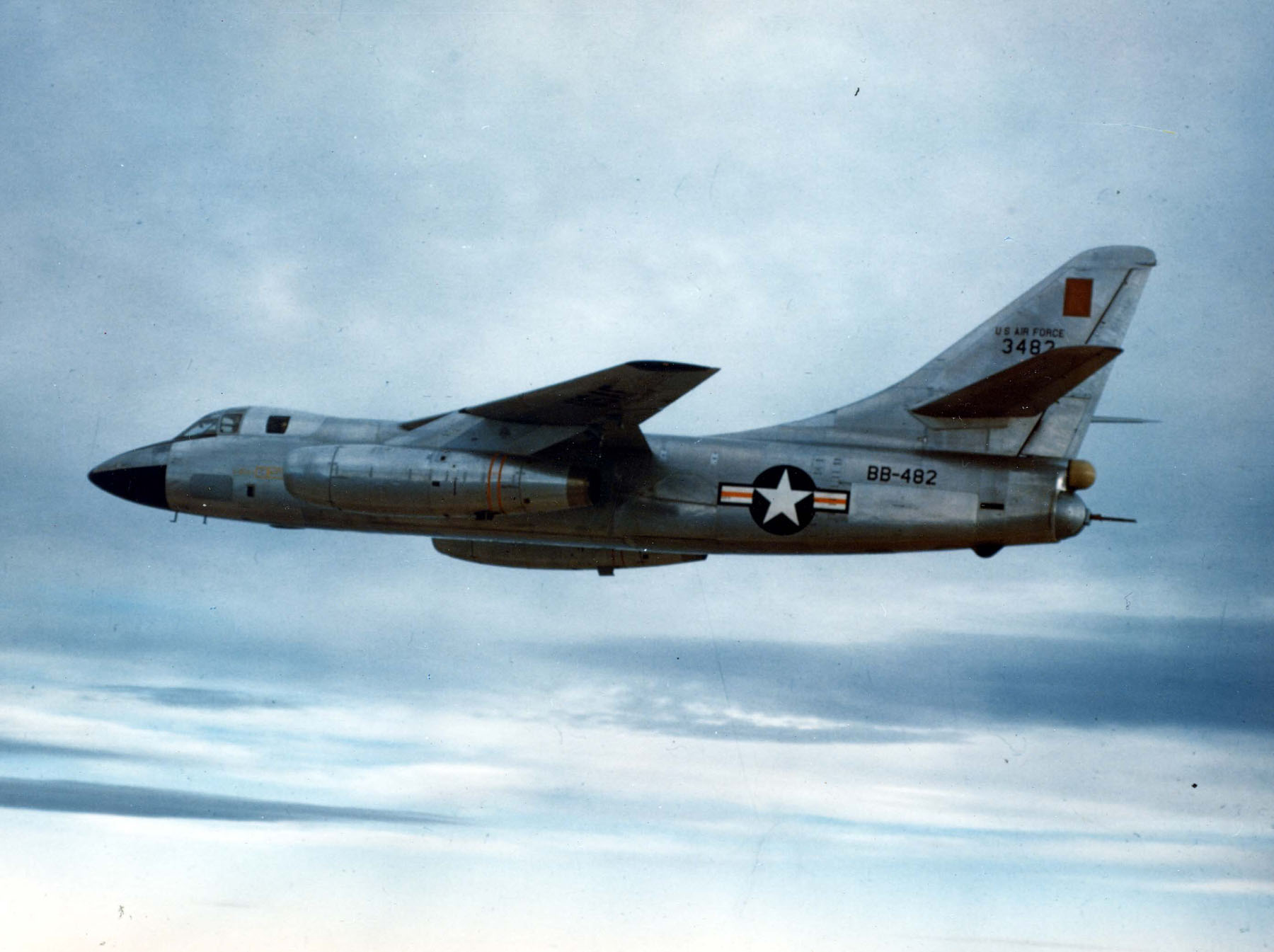
Douglas B-66B Destroyer in flight

After the Korean armistice in June 1953, the squadron remained in South Korea for a year and a half until being moved to Miho Air Base, Japan in October 1954. Funding reductions after the Korean War led to the squadron's B-26s being transferred to the 3d Bombardment Group; and the 34th, along with the 17th Bombardment Wing, was moved to Eglin Air Force Auxiliary Field No. 9, Florida on 1 April 1955 and transferred to Tactical Air Command (TAC) as the 34th Bombardment Squadron, Tactical.

At Eglin, the squadron was re-equipped with the new Martin B-57B Canberra, which had gone into service with TAC as a replacement for the B-26 Invader. The early model B-57Bs, however suffered from many technical problems, including an engine malfunction which filled up the cockpit with toxic fumes, which led to a brief grounding. The type was also found to be severely accident prone, due to difficulties with the aircraft's control surfaces.

The Canberras were replaced by the Douglas B-66B Destroyer, which began arriving in March 1956, with the 34th being the first recipient. The B-66, being an Air Force version of the Navy Douglas A3D Skywarrior, was a much more reliable aircraft that filled the needs of the Air Force for a jet medium bomber. In January 1958, the squadron deployed to RAF Sculthorpe, England where its aircraft were subsequently transferred to the 47th Bombardment Wing, replacing obsolete North American B-45C Tornados.

The 43d returned to Eglin Auxiliary Field No. 9 in March 1958, but due to budget issues, the squadron and its host 17th Bombardment Group were inactivated on 25 June 1958.

==== Strategic Air Command ====
The squadron designation was transferred from TAC to Strategic Air Command (SAC) in November 1962 as part of a process to re-designate Boeing B-52 Stratofortress "Strategic Wings", which were set up by SAC to disperse its bombers to numerous bases to avoid a single nuclear strike taking out an entire wing at one place. The dispersal, or "Strategic" wings consisted of one bomb and one air refueling squadron. As SAC Major Command designated units (MAJCOM), the wings were not able to carry a lineage or history as Air Force designated wings (AFCON) could.

To remedy this, the Strategic Wings would be given designations of inactive MAJCOM Wings that had notable combat records in World War II, and/or low pre-war designations. The 17th Bombardment Wing, Heavy, was organized on 1 February 1963 which assumed the assets of the 4043d Strategic Wing at Wright-Patterson Air Force Base, Ohio. The 34th Bombardment Squadron, Heavy, was placed under the 17th Bomb Wing, and assumed the personnel and B-52Es of the 42d Bombardment Squadron, which was inactivated. These changes were administrative in nature, and no actual personnel changes were made.

The squadron stood nuclear alert at Wright-Patterson, and also provided crews to other Strategic Air Command units conducting combat operations over Southeast Asia ss part of Operation Arc Light, however the squadron's B-52Es were never deployed and remained on nuclear alert. Upgraded to the B-52H in 1968 when the E-models were retired and sent to storage at Davis–Monthan Air Force Base.

The squadron moved to Beale Air Force Base, California when SAC pulled out of Wright-Patterson in 1975, absorbing the B-52G assets of the 744th Bombardment Squadron. It flew training missions at Beale for about a year when it was inactivated along with the 17th Bombardment Wing as part of the phaseout of the B-52 at Beale in 1976.

=== Modern era ===
The 34th Bomb Squadron was reactivated at Castle Air Force Base, California on 1 July 1992 by Air Combat Command. With the inactivation of SAC, ACC formed a B-52G squadron at Castle as a geographically separated unit of the 366th Wing, a composite wing based at Mountain Home Air Force Base, Idaho. It operated its B-52 squadron at Castle separately from the 93d Bomb Wing, that had the facilities to support the Stratofortress and provided logistical and maintenance support for the 34th.

In early 1994 the B-52Gs were retired with the closing of Castle and the squadron moved to Ellsworth Air Force Base, South Dakota where it transitioned to the Rockwell B-1B Lancer, remaining part of the 366th Operations Group at Mountain Home. In 1997 the squadron moved to Mountain Home, taking its B-1s with it. In 2001, the squadron assigned conducted devastating attacks versus the Taliban and Al Queda after the 9/11 attacks.

Reassigned to the 28th Bomb Wing in 2002 when the 366th ended its composite organization and moved back to Ellsworth. Deployed again to South Asia and, in 2003, the squadron kicked off Operation Iraqi Freedom with the largest precision guided bomb strike in history, when four B-1s delivered 96 GBU-31 2,000 lb JDAMs.

== Lineage ==
- Organized as the 34th Aero Squadron on 11 June 1917

Redesignated 34th Aero Squadron (Construction) on 25 July 1917
Redesignated 34th Aero Squadron (Training) on 23 December 1917
Demobilized on 10 June 1919

- Reconstituted and redesignated 34th Pursuit Squadron on 24 March 1923

Organized in inactive status by June 1929 as a Regular Army Inactive unit (Note: Regular Army Inactive units were units that were constituted in the regular army. Although they were not activated, they were organized with reserve personnel during the 1920s and early 1930s. Even though they had reserve personnel assigned, they were not Organized Reserve units. Because they had no regular personnel they were still considered inactive in the regular army. Clay, p. vi.)

- Activated on 15 July 1931

Redesignated 34th Attack Squadron on 1 March 1935
Redesignated 34th Bombardment Squadron (Medium) on 17 October 1939
Redesignated 34th Bombardment Squadron, Medium on 9 October 1944
Inactivated on 26 November 1945

- Redesignated 34th Bombardment Squadron, Light on 29 April 1947

Activated on 19 May 1947
Inactivated on 10 September 1948

- Redesignated 34th Bombardment Squadron, Light, Night Intruder on 8 May 1952

Activated on 10 May 1952
Redesignated 34th Bombardment Squadron, Tactical on 1 October 1955
Inactivated on 25 June 1958

- Redesignated 34th Bombardment Squadron, Heavy and activated on 15 November 1962 (not organized)

Organized on 1 February 1963
Inactivated on 30 September 1976

- Redesignated 34th Bomb Squadron and activated on 1 July 1992

=== Assignments ===
- Headquarters, Camp Kelly, 11 June 1917
- Aviation Concentration Center, 11 August 1917
- Air Service Headquarters, American Expeditionary Force, British Isles, 19 September 1917 (attached to Royal Flying Corps for training: 20 September – 18 December 1917)
- Second Aviation Instructional Center, 23 December 1917 – May 1919
- Services of Supply, May 1919
- Eastern Department, 27 May – 10 June 1919
- 17th Pursuit Group (later 17th Attack Group, 17th Bombardment Group), 15 July 1931 – 26 November 1945 (Note: The squadron was allotted to the Sixth Corps Area until 28 February 1927 and the Ninth Corps Area until 1 September 1928. It was assigned in inactive status to the 8th Pursuit Group until 1 September 1928, then the 17th Pursuit Group until activated. Clay, p. 1399.)
- 17th Bombardment Group, 19 May 1947 – 10 September 1948; 10 May 1952 – 25 June 1958
- Strategic Air Command, 15 November 1962 (not organized)
- 17th Bombardment Wing, 1 February 1963 – 30 September 1976
- 366th Operations Group, 1 July 1992
- 28th Operations Group, 19 September 2002 – present

=== Stations ===
- Camp Kelly, Texas, 11 June – 11 August 1917
- England (several locations), 15 September – 19 December 1917
- Tours Aerodrome, France, 23 December 1917 – Early May 1919
- Colombey-les-Belles Airdrome Early May 1919
- France, May 1919
- Mitchel Field, New York, c. 27 May – 10 June 1919
- March Field, California, 15 July 1931 (Note: While the squadron was in Regular Army Inactive status from 1929 to 1931, reserve officers performed their summer training at Kelly Field. Clay, p. 1399.)
- McChord Field, Washington, 24 June 1940
- Pendleton Field, Oregon, 29 June 1941
- Portland Army Air Base, Oregon, 28 December 1941
- Pendleton Field, Oregon, 13 January 1942
- Lexington County Airport, South Carolina, 16 February 1942
- Barksdale Field, Louisiana, 24 June – 18 November 1942
- Telergma Airport, Algeria, 23 December 1942
- Sedrata Airfield, Algeria, c. 13 May 1943
- Djedeida Airfield, Tunisia, 25 June 1943
- Villacidro, Sardinia, Italy, c. 6 December 1943
- Poretta Airfield, Corsica, France, 21 September 1944
- Dijon/Longvic Airfield (Y-9), France, 20 November 1944
- Linz Airport, Austria, c. 18 June 1945
- Hörsching, Austria, 8 July 1945
- Marchtrenk, Austria, 10 August 1945
- Clastres Airfield, France, c. 3 October – c. 17 November 1945
- Camp Myles Standish, Massachusetts, 25–26 November 1945
- Langley Field (later Langley Air Force Base), Virginia 19 May 1947 – 10 September 1948
- Pusan Air Base (K-1), South Korea, 10 May 1952
- Miho Air Base, Japan, 10 October 1954-c. 19 March 1955
- Eglin Air Force Auxiliary Field No. 9, Florida, 1 April 1955
- RAF Sculthorpe, England, 18 January – 4 March 1958
- Eglin Air Force Auxiliary Field No. 9, Florida, 4 March – 25 June 1958
- Wright-Patterson Air Force Base, Ohio, 1 February 1963
- Beale Air Force Base, California, 30 September 1975 – 30 September 1976
- Castle Air Force Base, California, 1 July 1992
- Ellsworth Air Force Base, South Dakota, 4 April 1994
- Mountain Home Air Force Base, Idaho, 1 April 1997
- Ellsworth Air Force Base, South Dakota, 19 September 2002 – present

=== Aircraft operated ===
- Boeing P-12 (1931–1934, 1935–1936)
- Boeing P-26 Peashooter (1935–1935)
- Northrop A-17 (1936–1940)
- YA-19 (1936–1940)
- Douglas B-18 Bolo (1939–1940)
- Douglas B-23 Dragon (1940–1941)
- North American B-25 Mitchell (1941–1942)
- Martin B-26 Marauder (1942–1945)
- Douglas B-26 Invader, (1952–1956)
- Martin B-57B Canberra (1955–1956)
- Douglas B-66 Destroyer (1956–1958)
- Boeing B-52 Stratofortress (1963–1976, 1992–1994)
- Rockwell B-1 Lancer (1994 – present)

== See also ==
- List of American aero squadrons
- List of B-52 Units of the United States Air Force
