= 31st Test and Evaluation Squadron =

US Air Force unit

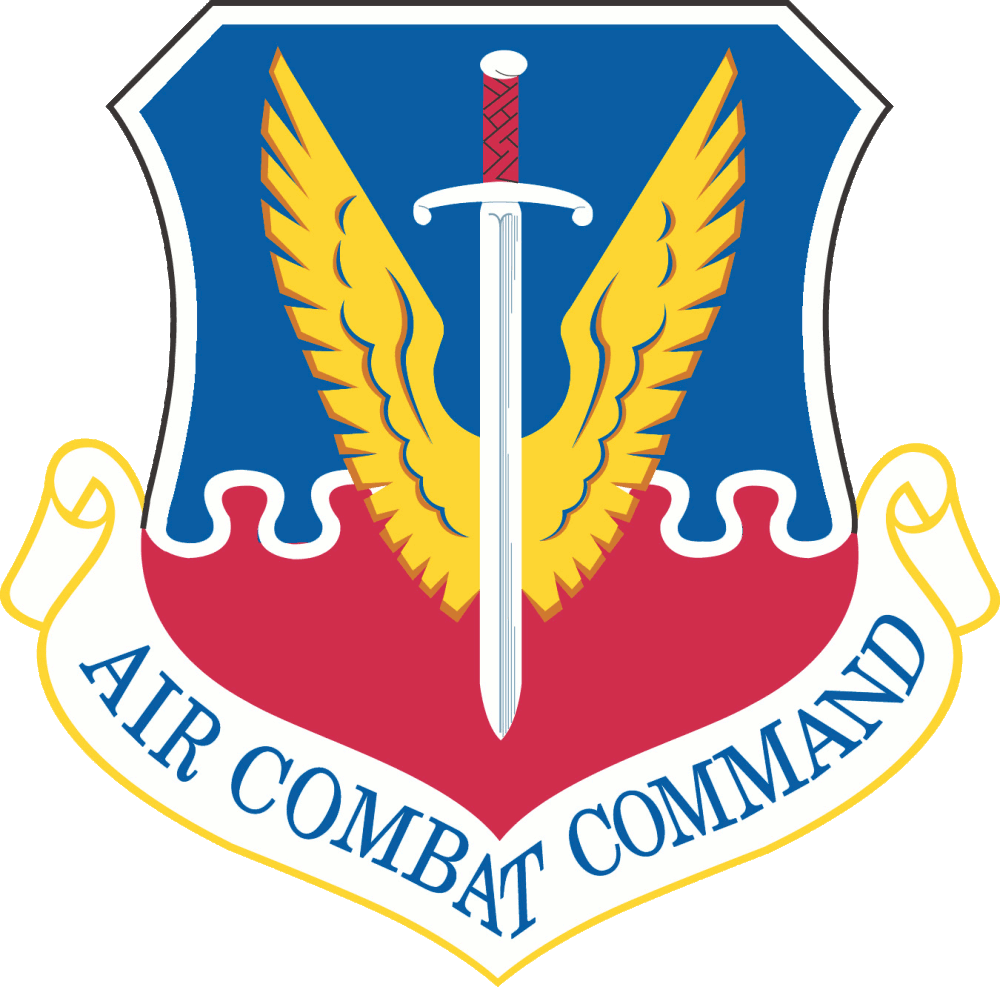
31st Test and Evaluation Squadron

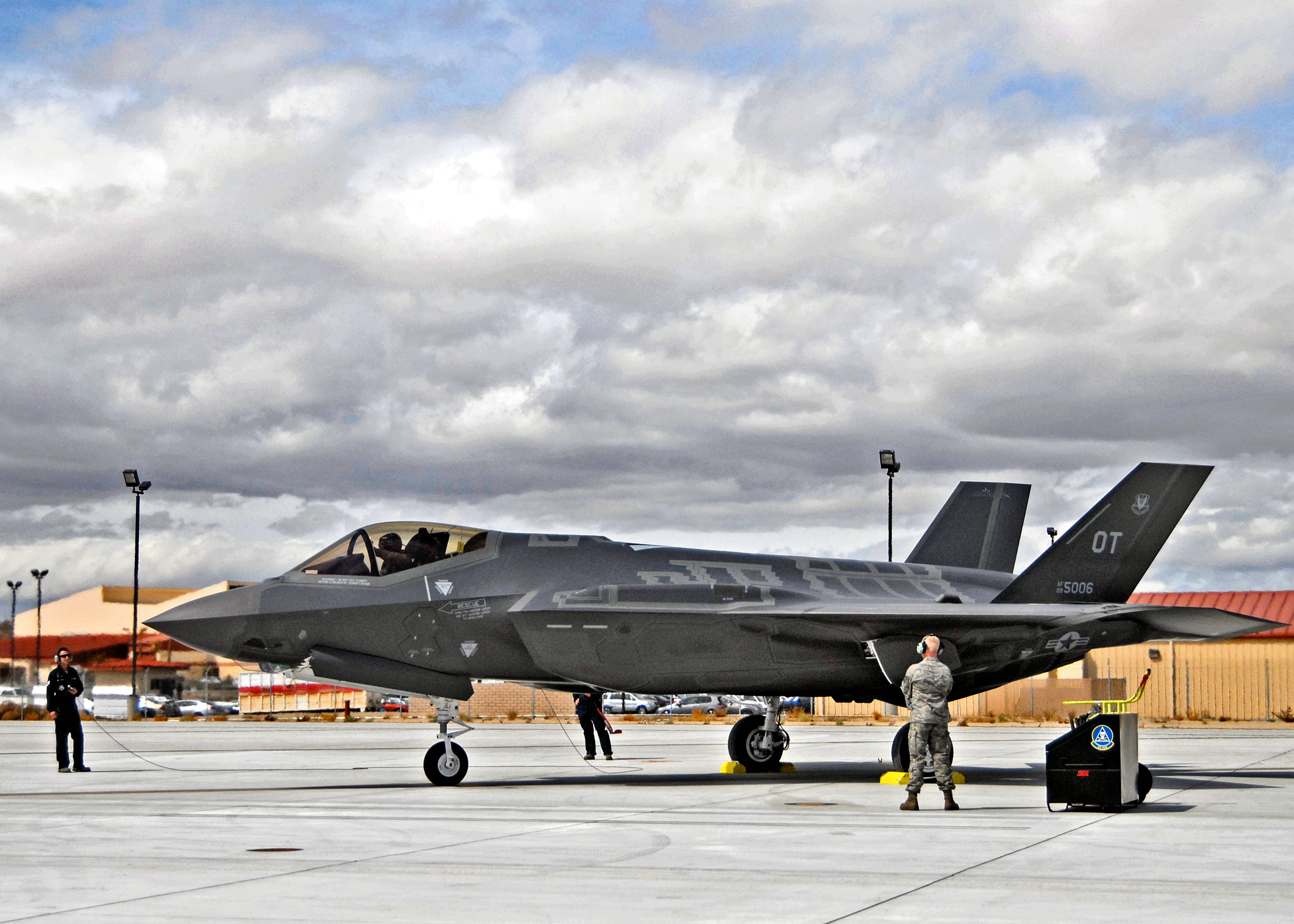
- 31st Test and Evaluation Squadron F-35A Lightning II (Note: Aircraft is Lockheed Martin F-35A Lightning II, serial 09-5006. This aircraft was assigned to the squadron in March 2013 for operational testing of how to best operate the aircraft in a combat environment.)
- Active: 1917–1919; 1923–1931; 1931–1963; 1986–present
- Country: United States
- Branch: United States Air Force
- Role: Operational testing and evaluation
- Part of: Air Combat Command
- Garrison/HQ: Edwards AFB, California
- Nickname: Desert Pirates
- Engagements: World War I World War II (Pacific Theater) Korean War
- Decorations: Distinguished Unit Citation; Presidential Unit Citation; Air Force Outstanding Unit Award; Philippine Presidential Unit Citation; Republic of Korea Presidential Unit Citation

Commanders
- Notable commanders: Carl Spaatz

Insignia
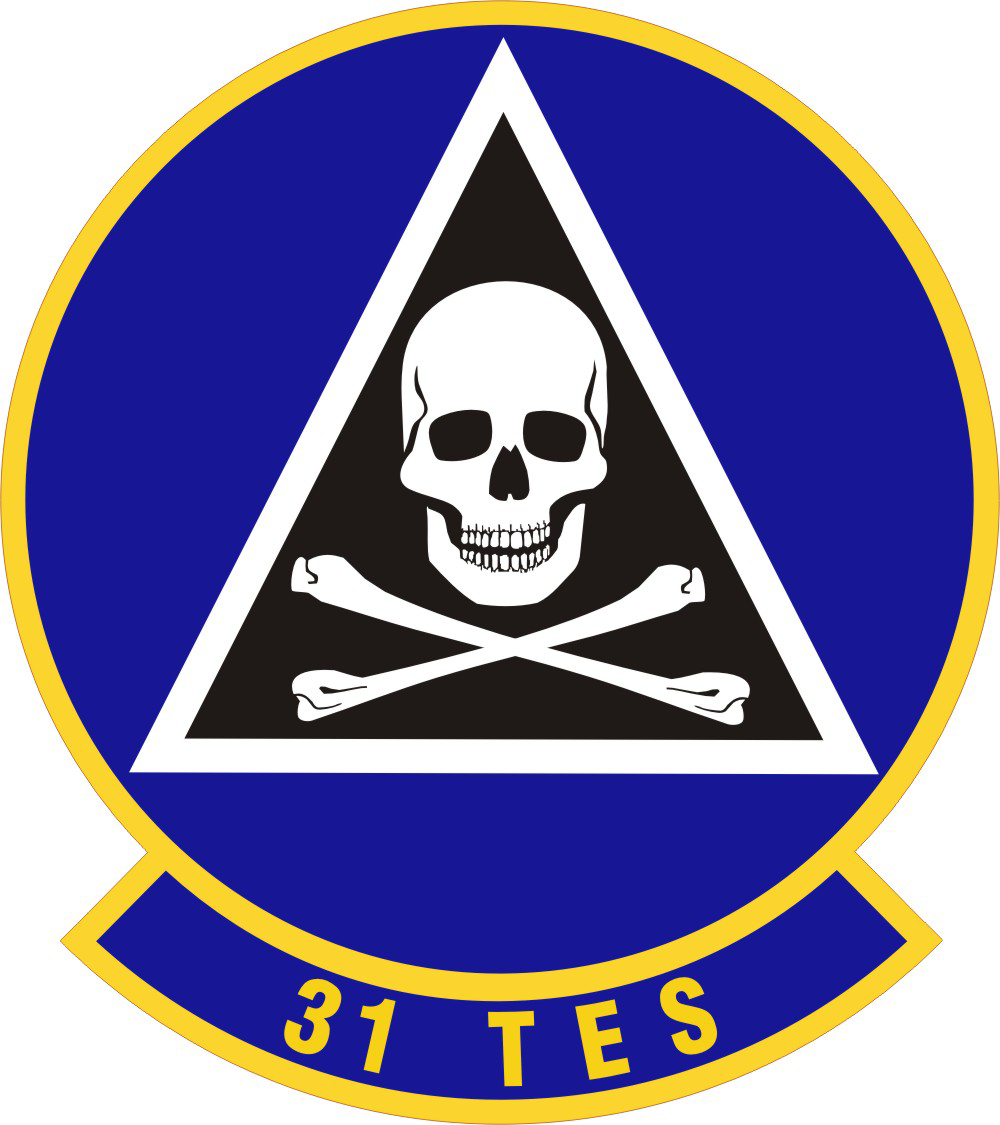
- 31st Test and Evaluation Squadron emblem (Note: Approved 10 August 2007.)

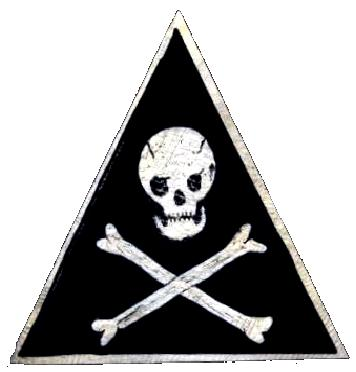
- 31st Bombardment Squadron emblem (Note: Approved 10 September 1934. Description: On a black triangle, one point up, bordered white, a skull and cross-bones proper.)

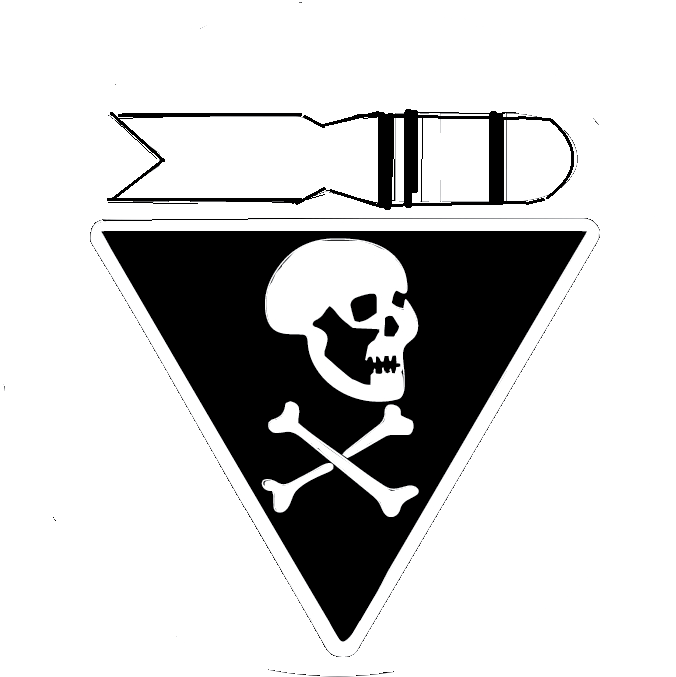
- 31st Aero Squadron emblem

The 31st Test and Evaluation Squadron is a United States Air Force unit, assigned to the 53d Test and Evaluation Group, stationed at Edwards Air Force Base, California as a geographically separated unit of the 53rd Wing. The 31 TES is an Air Combat Command (ACC) tenant unit at Edwards, providing personnel to support combined test and evaluation on Air Force weapons systems.

The squadron is one of the oldest in the United States Air Force, its origins dating to 26 June 1917, being organized at Kelly Field, Texas. The squadron deployed to England as part of the American Expeditionary Force during World War I. The squadron saw combat during World War II, and later became part of the Strategic Air Command (SAC) during the Cold War.

== Overview ==
The squadron provides Air Combat Command personnel to support combined test and evaluation on Air Force weapons systems. The unit also provides the Air Force Operational Test and Evaluation Center at Kirtland Air Force Base, New Mexico, and Air Force Materiel Command with test team members who have an operational perspective to perform test and evaluation on Combat Air Force systems.

The 31st is one of the oldest squadrons in the Air Force, its origins dating to 26 June 1917. Over this time, members of the squadron took part in World War I, World War II, and the Korean War.

== History ==
=== World War I ===
The 31st Test and Evaluation Squadron traces its history to the organization of the 31st Aero Squadron at Kelly Field, Texas, on 26 June 1917, shortly after the United States' entry into World War I. The first commander of the squadron was 1st Lieutenant John E. Rossel. It received personnel from First Company, B Provisional Battalion. About the first of July, orders were received to equip the squadron for overseas duty. The entire month of July was spent in drill and preparation for foreign service. Captain Carl Spaatz, who would later go on to become the first Chief of Staff of the United States Air Force. was placed in command on 13 July, bringing with him several men of previous military experience, who added much to the efficiency of the organization.

==== Across the Atlantic ====
The squadron left Kelly field on 11 August for Fort Totten New York, and after waiting transportation, the 31st was transported on 22 August to the Port of Entry, Hoboken, New Jersey, and were boarded on the RMS Baltic. The next day, they left Pier 59, en route to Halifax, Nova Scotia where the ship anchored awaiting for a convoy. Finally, on 5 September, the convoy was formed and the trans-Atlantic journey began.

On the night of 14 September, two red rockets were fired from an accompanying destroyer that had spotted a submarine periscope. The destroyer dropped depth charges on the submarine, and the Baltic made a sudden turn to port, that caused both men and anything loose aboard the ship to move. Suddenly a large explosion was heard and five long blasts were made by the ship's whistle and everyone on board was ordered to report to their assigned lifeboats. The Baltic's captain announced that a torpedo had struck the ship, but it had only made a glancing blow on the bow; that the emergency pumps were working and there was no danger. The next day, the Baltic arrived in Liverpool, England, and the men immediately boarded the train for Southampton, arriving at 1:00am on 15 September.

==== 3d Aviation Instruction Center ====
At Southampton, 50 of the men were detached from the squadron and were sent to various Royal Flying Corps schools to undergo training in machine gunnery and airplane construction. These schools were at Grantham, Uphaven, Lincoln and Reading, England. The remainder of the squadron proceeded to France, arriving in Le Havre on the 19th, and from there boarded a troop train to the First Army Air service Mechanics Regiment at Étampes. There, the squadron was divided into three detachments. Two were assigned to the Training Section of the AEF, being sent to French aircraft mechanics schools at Paris and Lyons. The third detachment was ordered to proceed to the 3d Air Instructional Center at Issoudun Aerodrome.

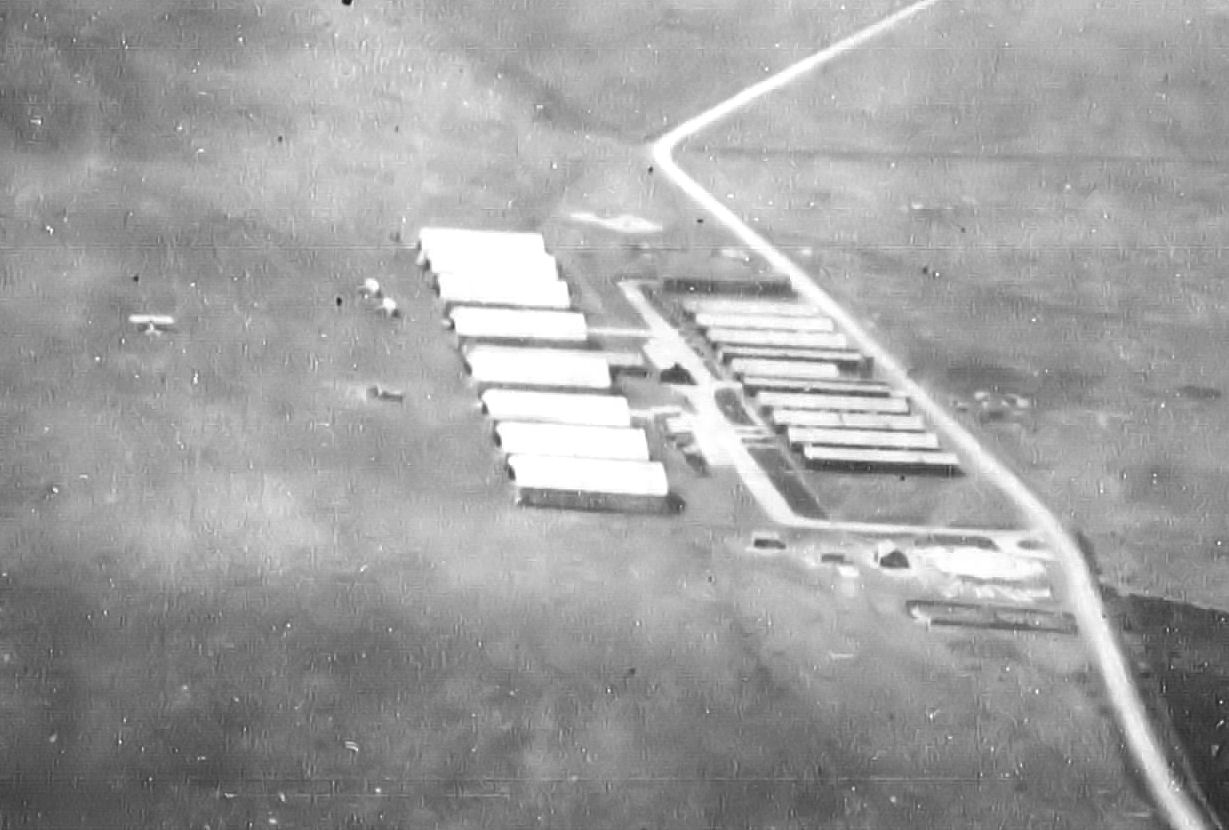
Issoudun Aerodrome – Field 5 1918

Initially, the men of the squadron at Issoudun were engaged in construction projects, such as putting up new buildings, hangars and other necessities to make the 3d AIC operational. The squadron was recombined at Issoudun Aerodrome just after Christmas Day, 1917. The men had been thoroughly trained in aircraft assembly, engine maintenance and the other skills needed for them to do their work at the 3d AIC. The men from England arrived on 14 January, and they had become instructors in pistol, rifle, and machine-gunnery. The duties of the squadron became the maintenance of the training aircraft, primarily French Nieuports at the school, which had been set up by the Training Section, AEF to train American pursuit pilots prior to them being sent into combat at the Front.

The 31st Aero Squadron was assigned to the care and upkeep of Nieuport 15-meter aircraft (Nieuport 17, 17bis, 21, 23, 24, 24bis, and 27s) at Field No. 5, which was used for taxiing, taking off, and landing and wing slips. It was at Issoudun that the squadron emblem, still in use today, was designed. In their off-hours, the men engaged in sports such as boxing and football. Athletics was an important part of the duty at Issoudun, giving the squadron, which was widely divided around the station, an esprit-de-corps and helped build morale. In addition to the aircraft work, squadron members were also engaged in expanding the 3d Aviation Instruction Center as necessary, erecting additional buildings and aircraft hangars as new airfields were required as training was expanded with additional pilots and aircraft.

During the month of September 1918, training was especially intense as new pilots, to be assigned to the new Second Army Air Service, began to arrive for instruction. By the time of the Armistice on 11 November, the men of the squadron held responsible positions in many of the support areas of the 3d Aviation Instruction Center. Although they did not enter combat, the men provided the means to train the pilots who went to the front and gave them the best of training so they might accomplish their work.

==== Demobilization ====
The 31st remained at Issodun until the end of December 1918 when orders were received to proceed to the 1st Air Depot, Colombey-les-Belles Airdrome, France, for demobilization. From Colombey, the squadron was moved to a staging camp under the Services of Supply at Bordeaux, France, in January waiting for a date to report to a base port for transportation home. In mid-March, the squadron boarded a troop ship, arriving in New York on 5 April. From there, the 31st moved to Mitchel Field, New York where the men were demobilized and returned to civilian life. The 31st Aero Squadron was demobilized on 14 April 1919 at Mitchel Field, New York.

=== Inter-war years ===
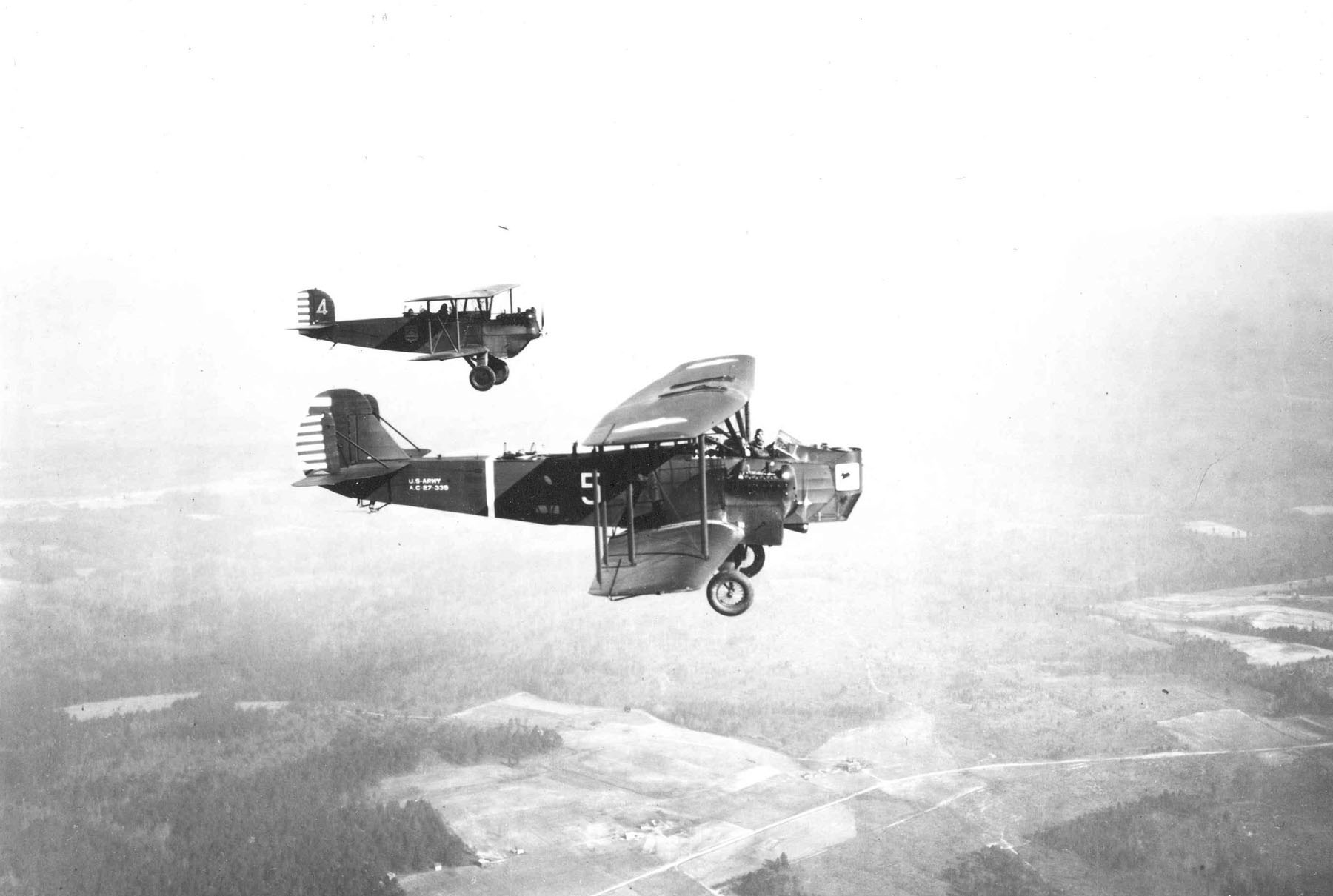
31st Bombardment Squadron – Keystone LB-5

The 31st Bombardment Squadron was reconstituted as a reserve Army Air Service unit on 24 March 1923, being assigned to the 7th Bombardment Group in the Third Corps Area. It was an active associate unit to the 49th Bombardment Squadron at Langley Field, Virginia. Its members spending their reserve commitments with the 49th, primarily supporting the Dayton-Wright DH-4s of the squadron. It was moved to the Ninth Corps Area in California on 28 February 1927 but never fully organized in the reserves. It was then moved to the Eighth Corps Area in Texas on 1 September 1928, and its members trained as individual reservists at Kelly Field.

On 1 April 1931 it was transferred to the United States Army Air Corps as a regular unit without reservists, being activated at March Field, California and assigned to the 7th Bombardment Group. It was initially equipped with Keystone B-3 and B-4 biplane bombers, the bombers usually differed from each other only in the type of engine which powered them, and it was often only possible to distinguish one from the other by an examination of their serial numbers. The Keystone planes were the standard Army bomber during the 1920s and about as powerful as their World War I contemporaries, but in terms of safety they were much improved.

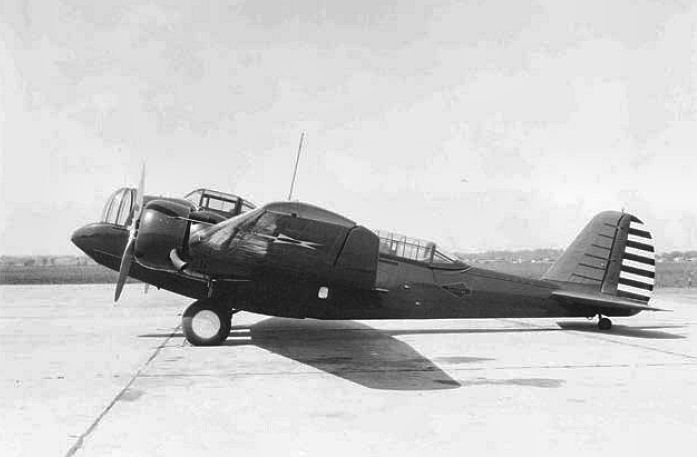
31st Bombardment Squadron – Martin B-10

The group was transferred on 5 December 1934 to the newly built Hamilton Field, near San Francisco, as part of a realignment of the Air Corps units in California due to the closure of Rockwell Field near San Diego and the transfer of units from Rockwell to March Field. At Hamilton Field, the 31st was upgraded Martin B-10 and B-12s, the first all-metal monoplane bomber to enter full production for the Army. It was also the first bomber to have a performance that exceeded that of contemporary pursuit aircraft. Again, the main difference between the bombers was the engine type. In the spring of 1937, the 31st received new Douglas B-18 Bolos, the 7th Group being the first operational unit to receive the bombers.

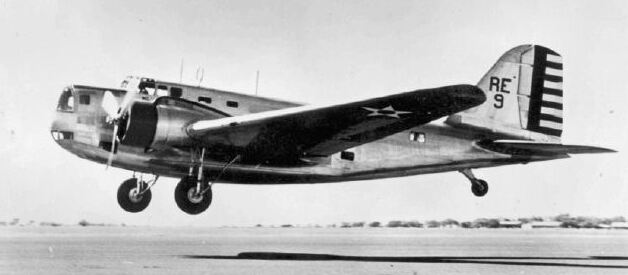
31st Bombardment Squadron – Douglas B-18 Bolo

The squadron trained at Hamilton until the end of 1937, when it was ordered to proceed to Hickam Field, Hawaii, to reinforce the Hawaiian Department. It departed from the port of San Francisco on the USAT Republic on 1 February 1938, arriving at the port of Honolulu on 8 February and transferring to Hickam the same day, being assigned to the 5th Composite Group. The 31st joined the 23d and 72d Bombardment Squadrons at Luke Field on Ford Island which were equipped with Martin B-12s. The 31st had brought its B-18s with it to Hickam, and it began engaging in reconnaissance flights over the Islands. In mid-1941, the 5th Bombardment Group began receiving B-17D Flying Fortresses from the United States, as part of the United States buildup of its Pacific forces due to rising tensions with the Japanese Empire.

On 6 December 1941, the 5th had a total of 12 B-17Ds on the line at Hickam Field, along with 33 B-18s. Five additional B-17Ds with the 11th Bombardment Group, were also on the line at Hickam. The 38th Reconnaissance Squadron with four B-17Cs and two new B-17Es were inbound from Hamilton Field to Hickam on their way to Clark Field in the Philippines to reinforce the American force there.

=== World War II ===
During the Japanese attack on Pearl Harbor, 7 December 1941, 5 of the B-17Ds were destroyed, and the rest were damaged. Most of the B-18s were destroyed on the ground in the initial Japanese onslaught. The ones that remained played no significant role in subsequent operations. The 38th Reconnaissance Squadron arrived at Oahu at the height of the attack (radar operators mistakenly thought that the Japanese attack force was this flight arriving from California). Some of the planes managed to land at the short Haleiwa Fighter Strip, one set down on a golf course, and the remainder landed at Hickam under the strafing of Japanese planes. The 31st suffered eighteen casualties among assigned and attached personnel; four were killed and fourteen others wounded (two of the latter died of their wounds).

==== Defense of the Hawaiian Islands ====
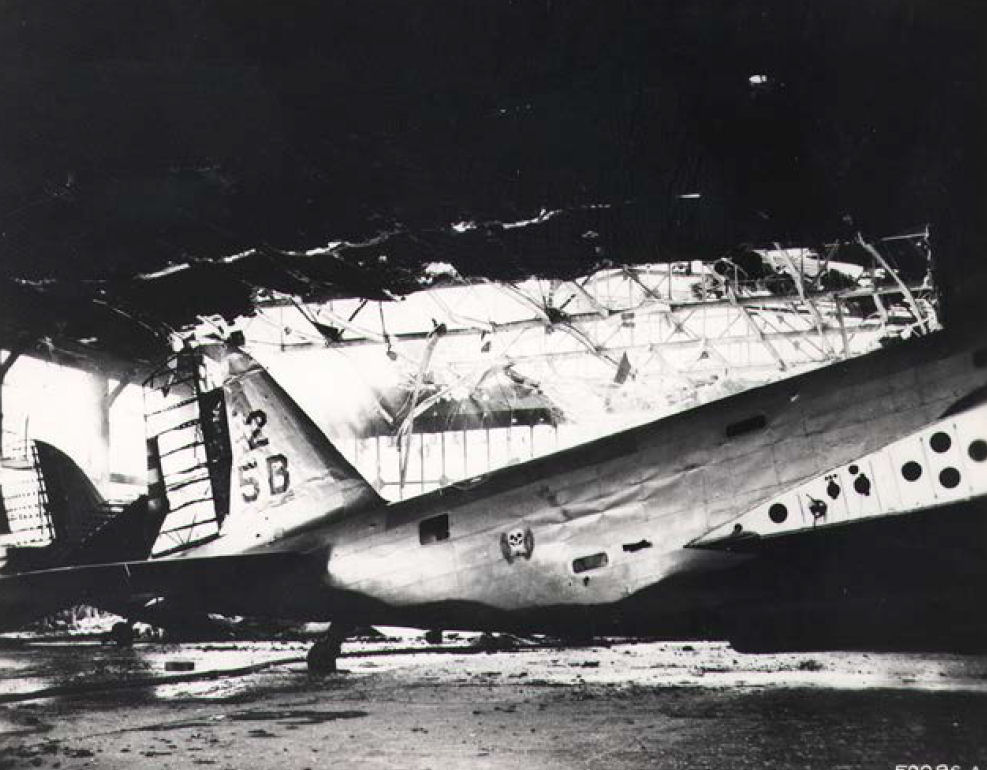
31st Bombardment Squadron – Damaged B-18s at Hickam Field

In the aftermath of the attack the planes that could be repaired were put back on the line, and were reinforced by the wider-tailed B-17E that had a tail gunner position. For the balance of 1942, the 31st remained in Hawaii, its aircraft flying long range reconnaissance missions from Kipapa Airfield and Kualoa Airfield. Its patrols ranged three or four hundred miles out from Oahu, searching for anything that might betoken another attack on Hawaii. In February the Hawaiian Air Force became the Seventh Air Force, and the 18th Bombardment Wing (comprising the 5th and 11th Groups) became the VII Bomber Command.

During this time, Hickam Field was taken off of operational status, being repaired from its battle damage and also becoming an Air Transport Command way-station, and the establishment of the Hawaiian Air Depot as a modification center for Air Technical Service Command, preparing planes for operation in the Pacific Theater with necessary modifications prior to their deployment to the combat areas.

In June 1942, during the Japanese threat to Hawaii with its Midway Island attack, the 31st was used for high-altitude bombing attacks against the Japanese carrier strike fleet. The squadron claimed the sinking of a large transport and numerous hits on a carrier, a battleship, and a cruiser., however, it was later learned that none of the bombs dropped by the bombers actually hit a single Japanese ship. An attack against naval vessels at sea was found to be a job best done by low-altitude medium bombers or by dive bombers.

==== Combat in the South Pacific ====
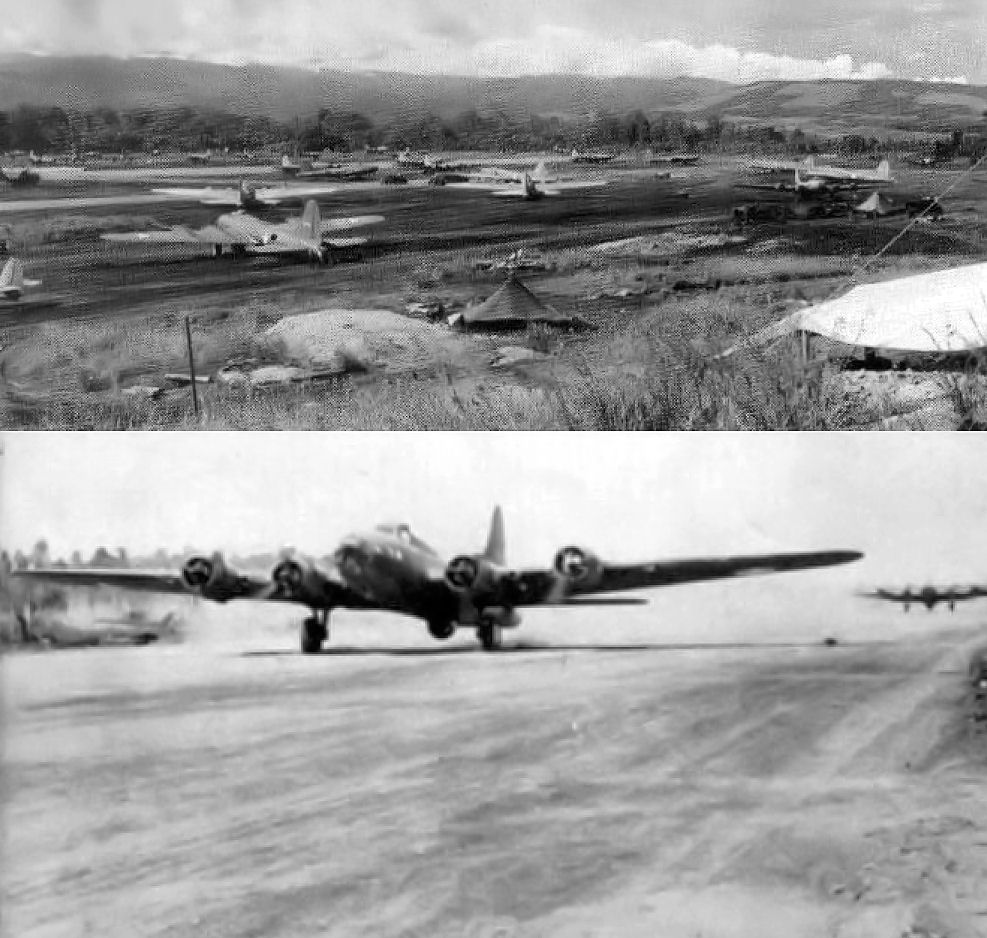
31st Bombardment Squadron – B-17 Flying Fortresses at Henderson Field

The victory at the Battle of Midway eliminated the Japanese threat against Hawaii. In November 1942, the 31st was deployed to Espiritu Santo in the South Pacific to fly long-distance bombing missions against Japanese forces in the Solomon Islands as part of the Mobile Force, Pacific. By January 1943, the 31st was flying combat missions from Espiritu Santo, or when possible, from Henderson Field, Guadalcanal, under a joint headquarters commanded by Colonel L.G. Saunders. Through the latter part of 1942 during the Battle of Guadalcanal, the 31st B-17s were as busy as the meager supply of fuel would permit them to be. They flew search missions over 1600 miles of open water. They made frequent attempts, generally unsuccessful, to stop the Tokyo Express — fast convoys that brought supplies and reinforcements from Japanese in the Northern Solomons through The Slot, as the expanse of sea between New Georgia and Santa Isabel Island was known, to the enemy forces on Guadalcanal.

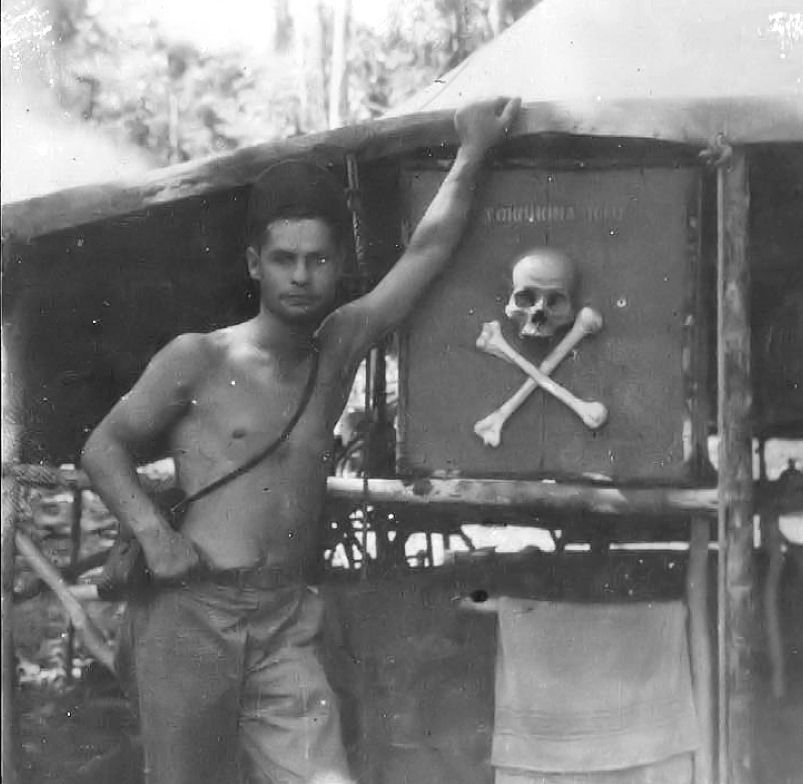
Squadron HQ, Somewhere in the South Pacific.

In January 1943, the 5th Group was relieved from assignment to the Seventh Air Force and reassigned to the Thirteenth Air Force. Activation of the Thirteenth Air Force, which took place on 13 January 1943, was a step intended to improve the handling of AAF units in the South Pacific, all of which were put under the jurisdiction of the new Air Force. Brigadier General Nathan F. Twining. During the spring of 1943, the process of replacing B-17s with B-24D Liberator was begun. The early B-24Ds received lacked firepower, especially in the nose of the aircraft. Japanese fighter pilots quickly discovered the deficiency and capitalized on it by making their attacks frontally. Lieutenant Colonel Marion D. Unruh—later Colonel and CO of the 5th—countered by designing a nose turret that eliminated the weakness; the Hawaiian Air Depot at Hickam installed the new turret in more than 200 B-24s during 1943.

As the tide of battle surged northward and westward through the Solomons, the Admiralties, the Caroline Islands, and finally to the Philippines, the heavy bombers of the 31st Bombardment Squadron as part of the 5th Bomb Group ranged ahead of the assault forces, bombing enemy convoys and installations, damaging—when they could not destroy—enemy airfields, fighting off Japanese fighters, and helping other elements of the Thirteenth Air Force, along with air units of the Navy, the Marine Corps, and the Royal New Zealand Air Force, to achieve air superiority over the Japanese air forces. The squadron raided the heavily defended Japanese base on Woleai during April–May 1944 and received a Distinguished Unit Citation (DUC) for its efforts.

Missions began to be flown in the Southwest Pacific Theater starting in June 1944 as the Japanese began their long retreat to their Home Islands. The 31st attacked enemy bases on Yap and in the Truk and Palau Islands, Jun–Aug 1944, preparatory to the invasion of Peleliu and the return to the Philippines at Leyte. Crews flew missions to the Netherlands East Indies on 30 September 1944, earning another DUC for an attack—conducted through heavy flak and fighter defenses—on oil installations at Balikpapan, Borneo.

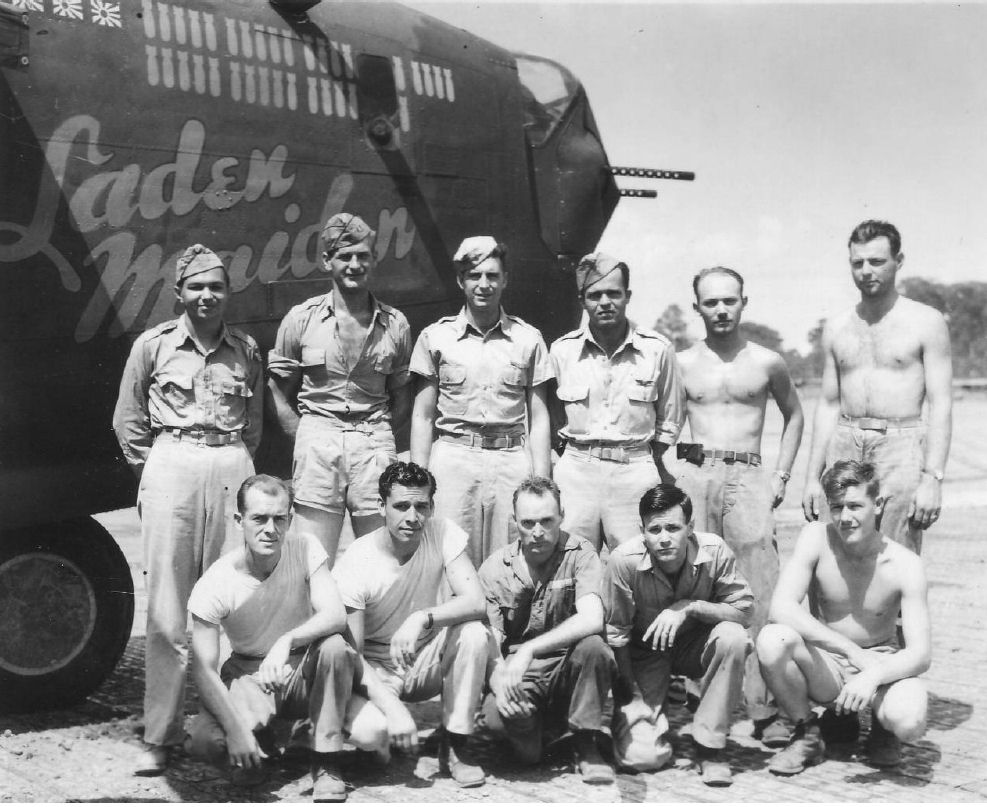
31st Bombardment Squadron – B-24 Liberator "Laden Maiden" and Crew, 1944

From October 1944 to the end of the war the 5th Bomb Group completed a variety of missions, including raids on enemy bases and facilities on Luzon, Ceram, Halmahera, and Formosa; support for ground forces in the Philippines and Borneo; and patrols off the China coast. The end of the war found the 5th Bombardment Group on Samar, Philippine Islands; it had been operating from there since March 1945.

In the aftermath of World War II, the 31st was stationed at Clark Field in the Philippines during December 1945, under the Thirteenth Air Force with its B-24Js. In October 1947, its B-24s were scrapped and it received F-13 Superfortresses (B-29s modified as long-range reconnaissance planes) and was redesignated as the 31st Strategic Reconnaissance Squadron. The redesignated 5th Reconnaissance Group was to engage in the Post Hostilities Mapping Program under the auspices of the Thirteenth Air Force; the target date for the project was 1 July 1949. The Group was broken up into detachments, and the 31st was sent to Kadena Air Base, Okinawa, and was detached to Headquarters, Far East Air Forces for operations when the 5th Reconnaissance Group returned to the United States in November 1949.

=== Korean War ===
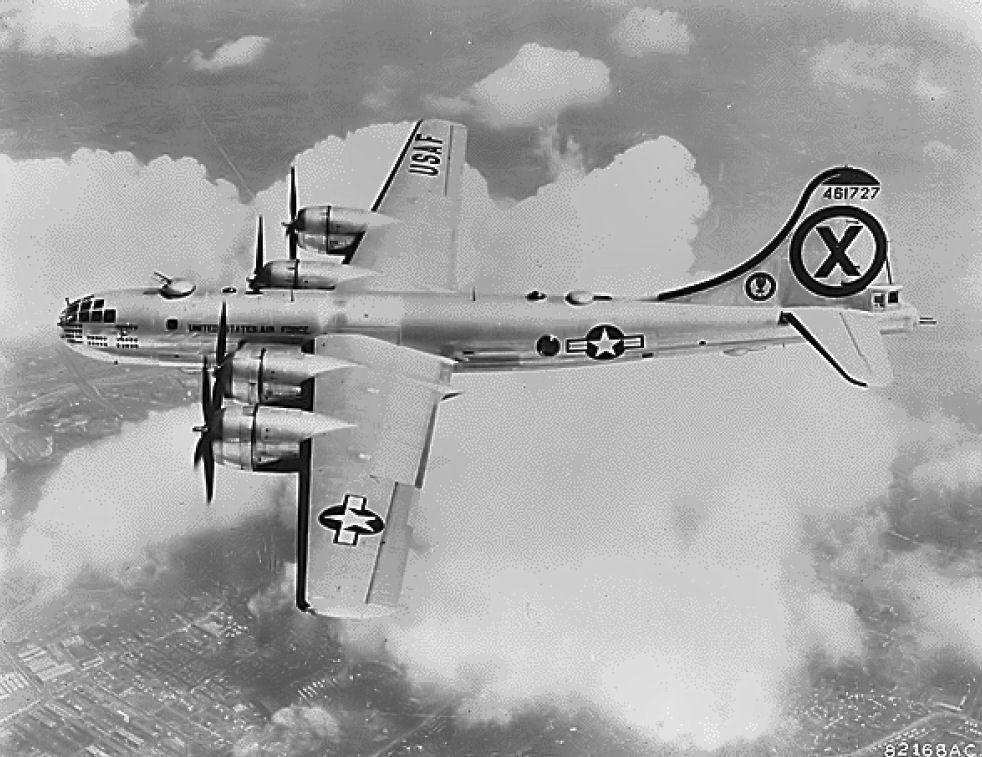
31st Strategic Reconnaissance Squadron RB-29 Superfortress.

In June 1950 with the breakout of the Korean War, the 31st was moved to Yokota Air Base, Japan on 12 July, to work operationally with the 91st Strategic Reconnaissance Squadron, which had deployed from McGuire Air Force Base, New Jersey also with RB-29s. With the resources of the two squadrons combined, the joint unit eventually flew the largest number of different aircraft in the Korean War and had more assigned personnel than any other flying unit in Far East Air Force. The unit's primary mission included electronic counter measures and bomb-damage assessment photography.

The unit's RB-29 flew throughout the Korean peninsula in the early part of the war. On 18 October 1950, a crew spied over 75 enemy fighter planes at Antung Airfield, across the Yalu River, immediately prior to the Chinese intervention. However, the unit was soon in trouble with the addition of MiG-15 aircraft into the air war. In November 1950, MiG's jumped a flak-damaged RB-29 near the Yalu River. In the ensuing aerial battle, the RB-29 rear gunner shot down one of the MiGs – the first MiG-15 shot down by a B-29 gunner. The RB-29 limped back to Japan and five crewmen were killed when it crashed during landing at Johnson Air Base. The FEAF restricted RB-29's from flying near the Yalu during daylight hours due to their vulnerability to the MiG-15s. In November 1950, the 31st was relieved from its mission and it transferred its assets at Yokota to the 91st SRS. The squadron returned to the United States and rejoined its home unit, the now 5th Strategic Reconnaissance Wing at Fairfield-Suisun Air Force Base, California.

=== Strategic Air Command ===
Much had changed since the 31st left Hamilton Field for Hawaii with its B-18s in the almost 13 years when it returned to Travis Air Force Base. On 14 November 1950, the group was re-designated the 5th Strategic Reconnaissance Wing (Heavy).

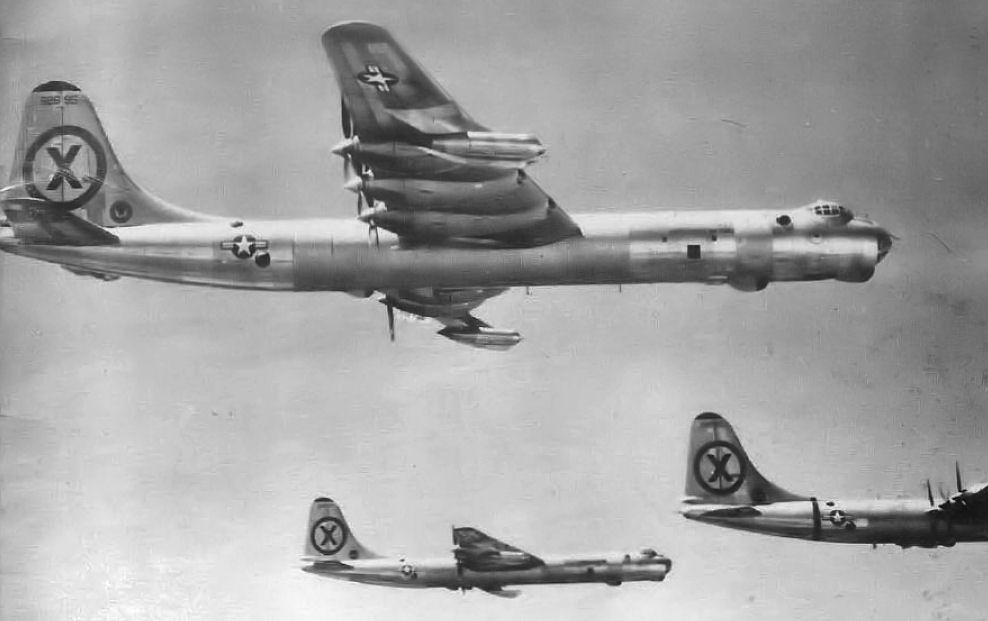
31st Strategic Reconnaissance Squadron RB-36D Peacemakers.

In December, an all-out conversion effort began and in January 1951, the wing received its first two RB-36D Peacemaker strategic reconnaissance aircraft. During the early 1950s, the wing performed operations to probe the eastern borders of the Soviet Union and People's Republic of China. Little was known about the air defense capability of the Soviet Union at this time and the most effective way of determining their capability was to probe the borders and see with what were called "Ferret missions". These missions, found that west of the Bering Strait there was virtually no Soviet radar coverage. As a result of these missions, USAF war plans were drawn up which directed a massive bomber attack to hit Russia from this direction, flying on to land in the Middle East or Africa, or more likely bailing out as the aircraft ran out of fuel. Gradually, during the 1950s, the Soviets began filling in the gaps in their radar coverage over northern Siberia, but large gaps on the outer perimeter between Alaska and Murmansk were still wide open for many years to come.

On 1 October 1955, the mission of the 5th became strategic bombardment, although the first training in bombardment missions had begun in 1953. The 31st was re-designated as the 31st Bombardment Squadron (Heavy). The RB-36Ds were replaced with B-36J Peacemakers configured for intercontinental bombardment missions. At that time, the wing began standing Strategic Air Command (SAC) nuclear alerts. The first Boeing B-52G Stratofortress jet bomber was delivered to the wing on 13 February 1959, and the 31st along with the 23d Bombardment Squadron were equipped with the jet bombers.

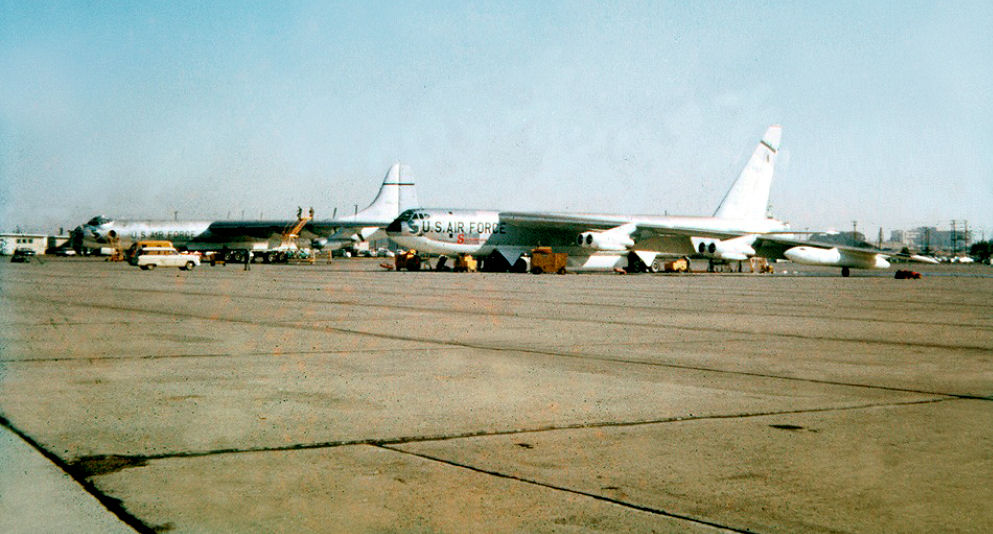
31st Bombardment Squadron – B-36 B-52 Conversion, 1959

With the effect of the equipment change, SAC plans was to disperse its B-52 bomber force over a wide number of bases, in order to insure that an entire wing of planes could not be taken out in one attack. The 31st with its 15 B-52s moved to Beale Air Force Base, California on 1 October 1959 and was reassigned to the 4126th Strategic Wing, a Major Command controlled organization at Beale, along with the 903d Air Refueling Squadron, flying Boeing KC-135 Stratotankers in support. At Beale, half of the squadron's aircraft were maintained on fifteen-minute alert, fully fueled, armed, and ready for combat. The 4126th's parent 14th Air Division also moved to Beale and the 4126th became responsible to provide support to the division as well as the San Francisco Air Defense Sector of Air Defense Command, which activated at Beale in 1959.

In 1962, in order to perpetuate the lineage of many currently inactive bombardment units with illustrious World War II records, Headquarters SAC received authority from Headquarters USAF to discontinue its Major Command controlled (MAJCON) strategic wings that were equipped with combat aircraft and to activate Air Force controlled (AFCON) units, most of which were inactive at the time which could carry a lineage and history. (Note: MAJCON units could not carry a permanent history or lineage. Ravenstein, Charles A. (1984). A Guide to Air Force Lineage and Honors (2d, Revised ed.). Maxwell AFB, AL: USAF Historical Research Center. p. 12.) As a result, the 4126th SW was replaced by the newly re-designated 456th Strategic Aerospace Wing (456th SAW), which assumed its mission, personnel, and equipment on 1 February 1963. In the same way the 744th Bombardment Squadron, one of the 456th's World War II historical bomb squadrons, replaced the 31st Bombardment Squadron, taking over its personnel and aircraft in an administrative reassignment. The 31st was subsequently inactivated on 1 February 1963.

=== Test operations ===
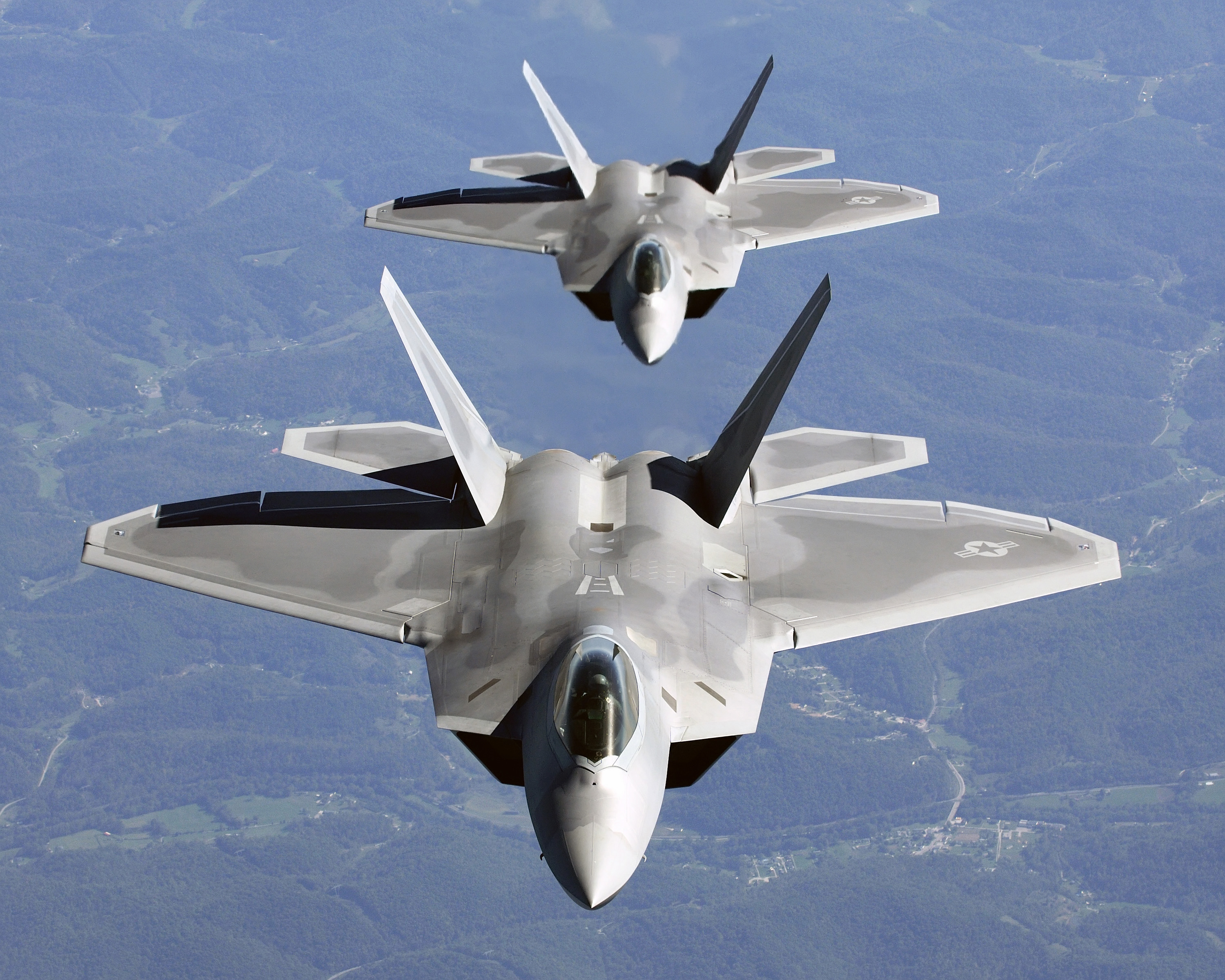
Today the 31st Test and Evaluation Squadron flies a number of advanced aircraft, including the F-22.

On 1 July 1986 the squadron was re-activated as the 31st Test and Evaluation Squadron at Edwards Air Force Base, California. Its mission was to support the General Dynamics FB-111 medium bomber for Strategic Air Command and to test modifications and upgrades prior to the changes being sent to field units. It also performed testing for modifications to the B-52 and B-1B Lancer strategic bombers and SR-71 Blackbird strategic reconnaissance aircraft.

In June 1992, with the inactivation of SAC, the squadron came under the new Air Combat Command (ACC). Under ACC, the squadron has continued its mission on a wide variety of weapons systems, including the B-2 Spirit Stealth Bomber, F-16 and F-22 fighters, the Boeing 747 Airborne Ballistic Laser (ABL) and now the F-35A Joint Strike Fighter.

=== Operations and decorations ===
- Combat Operations

Combat in Central Pacific, 7 December 1941 – c. 9 November 1942
Combat in South Pacific, 30 November 1942 – c. 1 April 1944
Combat in Western Pacific, 20 April 1944 – 2 September 1945
Combat in Korea, 28 Jun – 15 November 1950.

- Campaigns

World War II

Central Pacific, 7 December 1941 – 6 December 1943
Guadalcanal, 7 August 1942 – 21 February 1943
Northern Solomons, 22 February 1943 – 21 November 1944
Eastern Mandates, 7 December 1943 – 14 June 1944
Bismarck Archipelago, 15 December 1943 – 27 November 1944
Western Pacific, 17 April 1944 – 2 September 1945

Leyte, 17 October 1944 – 1 July 1945
Luzon, 15 December 1944 – 4 July 1945
Southern Philippines, 27 Feb – Jul 1945
China Offensive, 5 May–Sep 1945
Air Combat, Pacific Theater, 7 December 1941 – 2 September 1945

Korean War

UN Defensive 27 Jun – 15 September 1950
UN Offensive 16 Sep – 2 November 1950
CCF Intervention 3–115 Nov 1950

- Decorations

Distinguished Unit Citation

Wadke Island, 18 Apr – 15 May 1944
Borneo, 30 September 1944

Presidential Unit Citation (Navy), 1942
Air Force Outstanding Unit Award

1 June 2006 – 31 May 2008, 1 June 2004 – 31 May 2006, 1 June 2002 – 31 May 2004, 1 June 1998 – 31 May 2000, 1 June 1994 – 31 May 1996, 30 May 1992 – 29 May 1994, 1 July 1990 – 29 May 1992, 1 July 1988 – 30 June 1990, 1 July 1985 – 30 June 1987, 1 June 1998 – 31 May 2000, 1 June 2002 – 31 May 2004, 1 June 2004 – 31 May 2006, 1 June 2006 – 31 May 2008

Philippine Presidential Unit Citation (World War II)
Republic of Korea Presidential Unit Citation, 7 Ju1 – 16 November 1950.

== Lineage ==
- Organized as 31st Aero Squadron on 26 June 1917

Demobilized 14 April 1919
Reconstituted and redesignated as 31st Bombardment Squadron on 24 March 1923
Activated in the reserve on 24 March 1923
Inactivated in the reserve on 1 April 1931
Activated on 1 April 1931
Redesignated 31st Strategic Reconnaissance Squadron in October 1947.
Redesignated 31st Bombardment Squadron (Heavy) in 1955.
Discontinued, and inactivated in February 1963; personnel/aircraft/equipment transferred to 744th Bombardment Squadron
Redesignated 31st Test and Evaluation Squadron.
Activated 1 July 1986

=== Assignments ===
- Post Headquarters, Kelly Field, Texas, 26 June 1917
- Aviation Concentration Center, 11 August 1917
- Air Service Headquarters, AEF, British Isles, 16 September 1917

Detachment attached to Royal Flying Corps for training, 16 September 1917 – 14 January 1918

- Air Service Headquarters, AEF, 19 September 1917

Detachments attached to Training Section, AEF, 19 September – 25 December 1917

- 3d Aviation Instruction Center, 23 September 1917
- 1st Air Depot, December 1918
- Commanding General, Services of Supply, c. 6 January – c. 18 March 1919
- Eastern Department, c. 5–14 April 1919
- 7th Bombardment Group, 24 March 1923 (Reserves)
- 19th Bombardment Group, 1 September 1928 (Reserves)
- 7th Bombardment Group, attached on 1 April 1931, and assigned on 30 June 1931
- [th Composite Group (later 5th Bombardment Group, 5th Reconnaissance Group), 1 February 1938 – 10 March 1947
- 71st Reconnaissance Group, 20 October 1947
- Fifth Air Force (attached to 71st Reconnaissance Group), 18 August 1948
- Thirteenth Air Force, 16 March 1949
- 311th Air Division, 1 April 1949
- Second Air Force, 1 November 1949
- 5th Strategic Reconnaissance Group, 1 December 1949 (attached to Far East Air Forces, December 1949 – 16 November 1950, 5th Strategic Reconnaissance Wing after 15 February 1951)
- 5th Strategic Reconnaissance Wing (later 5th Bombardment Wing), 16 June 1952
- 4126th Strategic Wing, 1 October 1959 – 1 February 1963
- Strategic Air Command, 1 July 1986
- USAF Air Warfare Center, 1 June 1992
- 79th Test and Evaluation Group (later 53rd Test and Evaluation Group), 15 April 1993
- 753rd Test and Evaluation Group, 1 October 2021 – present

=== Stations ===
- Kelly Field, Texas, 26 June 1917
- Aviation Concentration Center, Garden City, New York, 11 August 1917
- England, 15 September 1917
- Issoudun Aerodrome, France, 17 January 1918
- Mitchel Field, New York, 5 April 1919 – 14 April 1919
- March Field, California, 1 April 1931
- Hamilton Field, California, 5 December 1934
- Hickam Field, Hawaii, 8 February 1938
- Kipapa Airfield, Hawaii, 23 May 1942
- Kualoa Airfield, Hawaii, 9 September 1942
- In Transit (9 November 1942 – 30 November 1942)
- Pekoa Airfield, Espiritu Santo, New Hebrides, 30 November 1942
- Henderson Field, Guadalcanal, Solomon Islands, 17 January 1943
- Momote Airfield, Los Negros, Admiralty Islands, 20 April 1944
- Wakde Airfield, Netherlands East Indies, 20 August 1944
- Kornasoren (Yebrurro) Airfield, Noemfoor, Schouten Islands, 26 September 1944
- Wama Airfield, Morotai, Netherlands East Indies, 16 October 1944
- Guiuan Airfield, Samar, Philippines, 17 March 1944
- Clark Field, Philippines December 1945 – 10 March 1947
- Yokota Field, Japan 20 October 1947
- Kadena Field (later Kadena Air Base), Okinawa, Japan, 16 March 1949
- Yokota Air Base, Japan c. 12 July 1950
- Johnson Air Base, Japan, 14 August 1950 – 16 November 1950
- Travis Air Force Base, California, 16 November 1950
- Beale Air Force Base, California, 18 January 1960 – 1 February 1963
- Edwards Air Force Base, California, 1 July 1986 – present

=== Aircraft ===
- Nieuport 24, 1918
- Nieuport 27, 1918
- Keystone B-3A
- Keystone B-4
- Thomas-Morse O-19
- Douglas Y1B-7
- Martin B-10
- Martin B-12
- Douglas B-18
- Boeing B-17
- Consolidated B-24
- B-25 Mitchell
- Boeing B-29
- Convair B-36
- Boeing B-52
- Boeing B-52
- B-1B
- B-2
- FB-111
- F-16
- Lockheed SR-71 Blackbird
- RQ-3 DarkStar
- Global Hawk
- Boeing YAL-1
- MQ-9 Reaper
- F-22
- F-35

== See also ==
- List of American aero squadrons
- List of B-52 Units of the United States Air Force
