= 744th Bombardment Squadron =

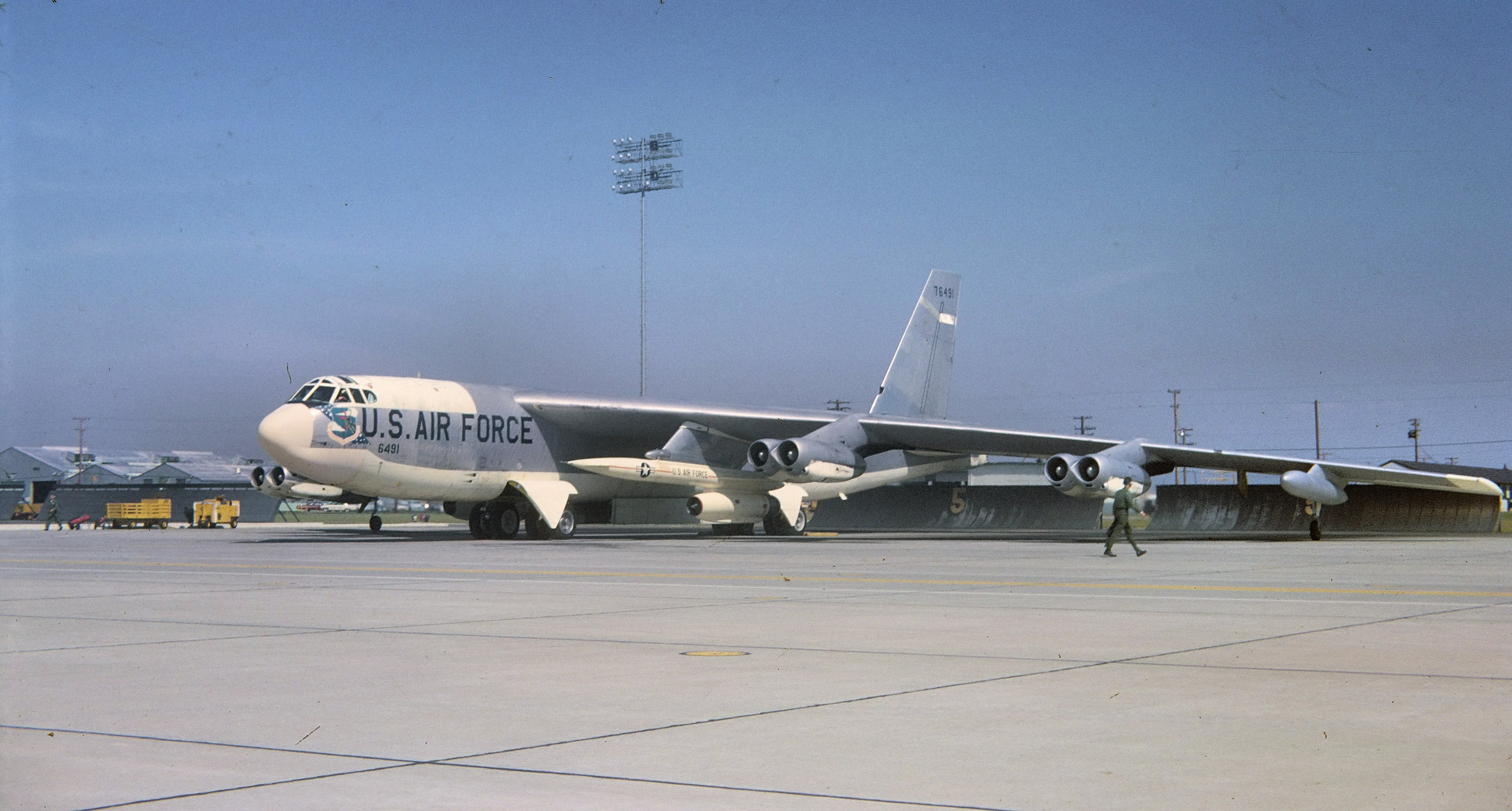
- 744th Bombardment Squadron B-52G Stratofortress with AGM-28 Hound Dog missile (Note: Aircraft is Boeing B-52G-85-BW Stratofortress, serial 57-6491 at Beale AFB, California. This aircraft was sent to the Aerospace Maintenance and Regeneration Center on 9 August 1990. Baugher, Joe (29 April 2023). "1957 USAF Serial Numbers". Joe Baugher.)
- Active: 1943–1945; 1947–1949; 1952–1956; 1963–1975
- Country: United States
- Branch: United States Air Force
- Role: Heavy bomber
- Nickname: The Deliverators (World War II)
- Engagements: Mediterranean Theater of Operations
- Decorations: Distinguished Unit Citation; Air Force Outstanding Unit Award

Insignia
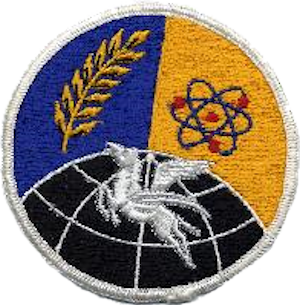
- Patch with 744th Bombardment Squadron emblem (SAC era)

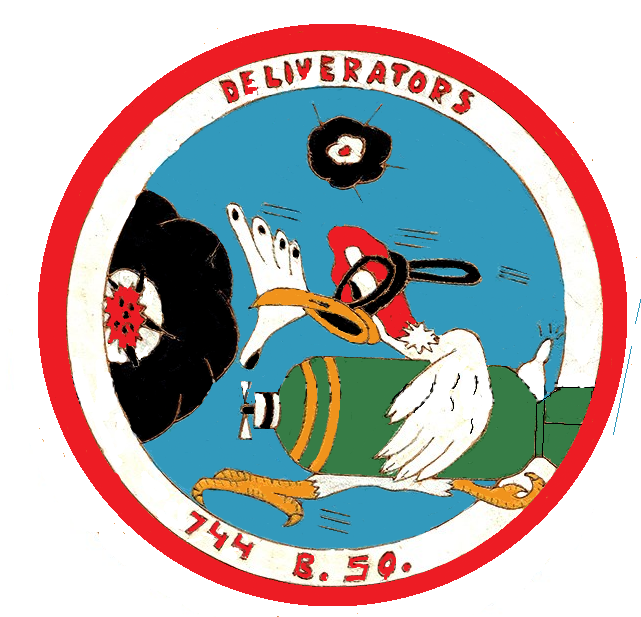
- 744th Bombardment Squadron emblem (World War II)

The 744th Bombardment Squadron is an inactive United States Air Force unit. It was last assigned to the 456th Bombardment Wing at Beale Air Force Base, California, and was inactivated on 30 September 1975, when its assets were transferred to another unit.

The squadron was first activated in June 1943. After training in the United States, it deployed to the Mediterranean Theater of Operations, where it participated in the strategic bombing campaign against Germany. It earned two Distinguished Unit Citations for its combat operations. Following V-E Day, the squadron returned to the United States and began reorganizing as a very heavy bomber unit, but after the Japanese surrender, was inactivated in October 1945.

The squadron was reactivated in the reserve in 1947, but does not appear to have been fully equipped or manned. It was activated again in 1952 as the 744th Troop Carrier Squadron, when the 456th Troop Carrier Group, replaced the 435th Troop Carrier Group, a reserve group that had been mobilized for the Korean War. It operated from Japan with elements of United States Air Force Security Service, until returning to the United States for inactivation in 1958.

The squadron returned to its heavy bomber designation when it was organized in 1963 as Strategic Air Command replaced its Major Command Controlled wings with units that could maintain a permanent history.

== History ==
=== World War II ===
The 744th Bombardment Squadron was first activated at Wendover Field, Utah on 1 June 1943, where it was one of the four original squadrons of the 456th Bombardment Group and received its initial cadre. Shortly thereafter the squadron moved to Gowen Field, Idaho and began to train with Consolidated B-24 Liberator bombers. It completed its training in December 1943 and began its movement to the Mediterranean Theater of Operations.

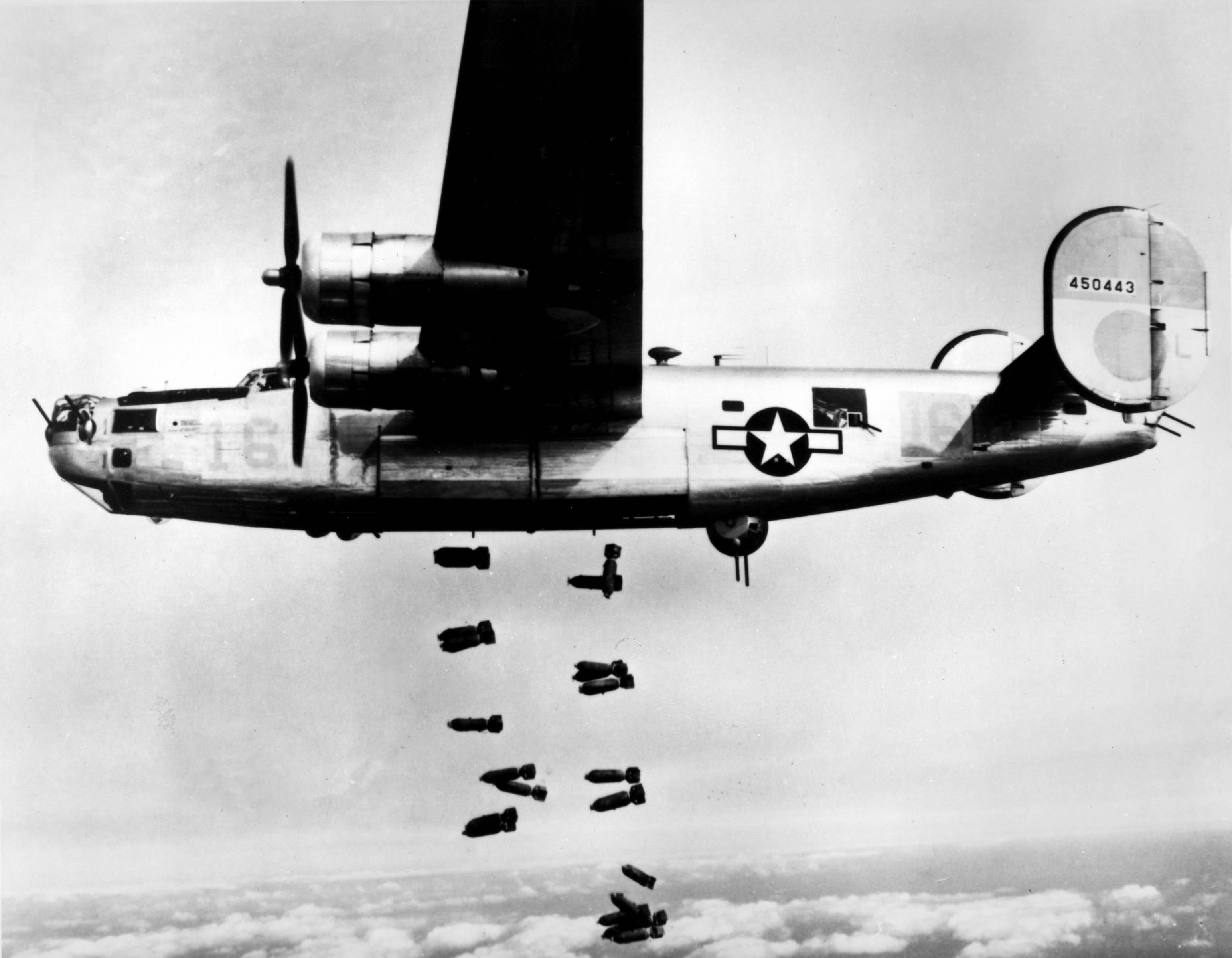
15th Air Force B-24 Liberator attacking a target

The squadron arrived in theater at Cerignola Airfield on 11 January 1944 and later that month moved to its combat station of Stornara Airfield, Italy. The squadron began combat operations the following month, primarily engaging in the strategic bombing campaign against Germany. Its early operations were conducted against airfields, aircraft factories, and railroad bridges in Italy, Austria and Romania. On 10 May 1944, the squadron was targeted against a manufacturing center at Wiener Neustadt, Austria. Adverse weather caused most of the attacking force to turn back before reaching the target. The 744th and the rest of the 456th Group proceeded to attack the target despite heavy interceptor opposition that was able to concentrate on defending against the group's Liberators. Its actions in this operation earned the squadron its first Distinguished Unit Citation (DUC).

The squadron expanded its operations to include attacks on locomotive manufacturing plants, oil refineries, oil storage facilities and viaducts in France, Germany, Czechoslovakia, Hungary, and the Balkan peninsula. On 2 July 1944, the squadron braved severe enemy fighter attacks while bombing oil facilities at Budapest, Hungary, for which it was awarded a second DUC.

The squadron was occasionally diverted from its strategic mission to carry out air support and air interdiction missions. From July through August 1944, it helped prepare the way for Operation Dragoon, the invasion of southern France. In the spring of 1945, it supported Operation Grapeshot, the offensive by the United States Fifth Army and British Eighth Army against remaining German forces in northern Italy.

Following V-E Day, the squadron airlifted supplies to airfields in northern Italy. It returned to the United States in July and began to reorganize as a very heavy bomber unit. However, with the surrender of Japan, the squadron was inactivated on 17 October 1945.

=== Air Force reserve ===
The squadron was reactivated as a reserve unit under Air Defense Command (ADC) at McChord Field, Washington in July 1947, where its training was supervised by ADC's 406th AAF Base Unit (later the 2345th Air Force Reserve Training Center). It was nominally a very heavy bomber unit, but the squadron does not appear to have been fully manned or equipped with operational aircraft while a reserve unit. In 1948 Continental Air Command (ConAC) assumed responsibility for managing reserve and Air National Guard units from ADC. President Truman's reduced 1949 defense budget required reductions in the number of units in the Air Force. ConAC also reorganized its reserve units under the wing base organization system in June 1949. As a result, the squadron was inactivated and its personnel and equipment were transferred to elements of the 302d Troop Carrier Wing, which was activated simultaneously.

=== Troop carrier operations ===
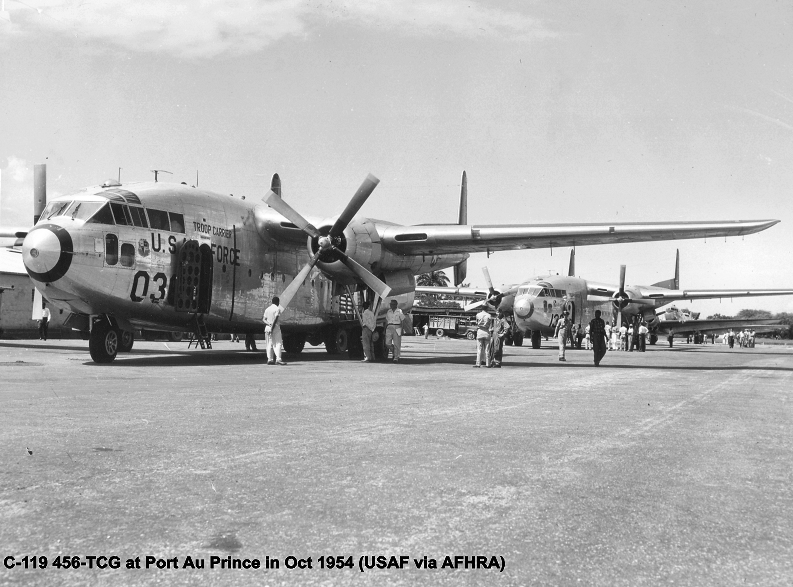
C-119 Flying Boxcars from the 456th Troop Carrier Group deployed to Port-au-Prince, Haiti, October 1954

The squadron was redesignated the 744th Troop Carrier Squadron and activated at Miami International Airport, Florida, where it replaced the 76th Troop Carrier Squadron, a reserve unit that had been mobilized for the Korean War and which was returning to reserve status. The squadron and its Fairchild C-119 Flying Boxcars moved to Charleston Air Force Base, South Carolina in August 1953. It participated in numerous military exercises in the United States and overseas, primarily with airborne forces of the United States Army.

In March 1955, the 456th Troop Carrier Wing reorganized, and the squadron was assigned directly to wing headquarters as the 456th Group and all wing support organizations were inactivated, while the squadron formed a detachment with eight C-119L aircraft. In October, the squadron moved with the wing to Shiroi Air Base, Japan, but the flying detachments of the wing were located at various points between Okinawa and Alaska. The squadron took part in Project Drag Net, recovering instrument packages from high altitude research or reconnaissance balloons. (Note: The project or aspects of it operated under various code names: Project Genetrix, WS-119L, and Project Moby Dick. Project Drag Net apparently referred to the training portion of the operation.) The project was terminated in May 1956 due to its low success rate, although the squadron earned an Air Force Outstanding Unit Award for its participation. The squadron returned to the United States and Ardmore Air Force Base, Oklahoma, where it was inactivated in July 1956 and its assets transferred to the 339th Troop Carrier Squadron.

=== Strategic Air Command ===
In 1962, in order to perpetuate the lineage of many currently inactive bombardment units with illustrious World War II records, Strategic Air Command (SAC) received authority from Headquarters USAF to discontinue its Major Command controlled strategic wings that were equipped with combat aircraft and to activate Air Force controlled units, which could carry a lineage and history. (Note: MAJCON units could not carry a permanent history or lineage. Ravenstein, Guide to Air Force Lineage and Honors, p. 12.) As a result, the 456th Strategic Aerospace Wing replaced the 4126th Strategic Wing at Beale Air Force Base, California. As part of this organizational action, the squadron again became the 744th Bombardment Squadron and took over the mission, personnel and equipment of the 31st Bombardment Squadron, which was simultaneously inactivated.

One half of the squadron's Boeing B-52G Stratofortress aircraft were maintained on fifteen minute alert, fully fueled and ready for combat to reduce vulnerability to a Soviet missile strike. The squadron continued the mission of strategic bombardment training. It frequently deployed aircraft and crews to meet USAF requirements, often having nearly all of the squadron's resources scattered around the world at various operating locations. The squadron was inactivated on 30 September 1975, and its mission, equipment and personnel were transferred to the 34th Bombardment Squadron, which moved on paper to Beale from Wright-Patterson Air Force Base, Ohio.

=== Provisional unit ===
In June 2002, the squadron was redesignated the 744th Expeditionary Airlift Squadron, converted to provisional status and assigned to Air Mobility Command. It has not been active under its most recent designation.

== Lineage ==
- Constituted as the 744th Bombardment Squadron (Heavy) on 14 May 1943

Activated on 1 June 1943
Redesignated 744th Bombardment Squadron, Heavy c. 5 March 1944
Redesignated 744th Bombardment Squadron, Very Heavy on 5 August 1945
Inactivated on 17 October 1945

- Activated in the reserve on 12 July 1947

Inactivated on 27 June 1949

- Redesignated 744th Troop Carrier Squadron, Medium on 15 October 1952

Activated on 1 December 1952
Inactivated on 9 July 1956

- Redesignated 744th Bombardment Squadron, Heavy and activated on 15 November 1962 (not organized)

Organized on 1 February 1963
Inactivated on 30 September 1975

- Redesignated 744th Expeditionary Airlift Squadron and converted to provisional status on 12 June 2002

=== Assignments ===
- 456th Bombardment Group, 1 June 1943 – 17 October 1945
- 456th Bombardment Group, 12 July 1947 – 27 June 1949
- 456th Troop Carrier Group, 1 December 1952
- 456th Troop Carrier Wing, 1 March 1955 – 9 July 1956
- Strategic Air Command, 15 November 1962 (not organized)
- 456th Strategic Aerospace Wing (later 456th Bombardment Wing), 1 February 1963 – 30 September 1975
- Air Mobility Command to activate or inactivate as needed

=== Stations ===
- Wendover Field, Utah, 1 June 1943
- Gowen Field, Idaho, 14 July 1943
- Bruning Army Air Field, Nebraska, 2 August 1943
- Kearns Army Air Base, Utah, 9 September 1943
- Muroc Army Air Field, California, 2 October–4 December 1943
- Cerignola Airfield, Italy, 11 January 1944
- Stornara Airfield, Italy, 27 January 1944 – 19 July 1945
- Sioux Falls Army Air Field, South Dakota, 1 August 1945
- Smoky Hill Army Air Field, Kansas, 17 August-17 October 1945
- McChord Field (later McChord Air Force Base), Washington, 12 July 1947 – 27 June 1949
- Miami International Airport, Florida, 1 December 1952
- Charleston Air Force Base, South Carolina, 15 August 1953 – 16 October 1955
- Shiroi Air Base, Japan, 10 November 1955
- Ardmore Air Force Base, Oklahoma, 6 June–9 July 1956
- Beale Air Force Base, California, 1 February 1963 – 30 September 1975

=== Aircraft ===
- Consolidated B-24 Liberator, 1943–1945
- Boeing B-29 Superfortress, 1945
- Fairchild C-119 Flying Boxcar, 1952–1956
- Boeing B-52 Stratofortress, 1963–1975

=== Awards and campaigns ===
Award streamer	Award	Dates	Notes
	Distinguished Unit Citation	10 May 1944	Wiener Neustadt, Austria 744th Bombardment Squadron
	Distinguished Unit Citation	2 July 1944	Budapest, Hungary 744th Bombardment Squadron
	Air Force Outstanding Unit Award	1 April 1955-20 March 1956	744th Troop Carrier Squadron

Campaign Streamer	Campaign	Dates	Notes
	Air Offensive, Europe	11 January 1944 – 5 June 1944	744th Bombardment Squadron
	Air Combat, EAME Theater	11 January 1944 – 11 May 1945	744th Bombardment Squadron
	Naples-Foggia	11 January 1944 – 21 January 1944	744th Bombardment Squadron
	Anzio	22 January 1944 – 24 May 1944	744th Bombardment Squadron
	Rome-Arno	22 January 1944 – 9 September 1944	744th Bombardment Squadron
	Central Europe	22 March 1944 – 21 May 1945	744th Bombardment Squadron
	Southern France	15 August 1944 – 14 September 1944	744th Bombardment Squadron
	North Apennines	10 September 1944 – 4 April 1945	744th Bombardment Squadron
	Rhineland	15 September 1944 – 21 March 1945	744th Bombardment Squadron
	Po Valley	3 April 1945 – 8 May 1945	744th Bombardment Squadron

== See also ==
- List of B-52 Units of the United States Air Force
- Project Skyhook
- B-24 Liberator units of the United States Army Air Forces
