= 746th Expeditionary Airlift Squadron =

746th Expeditionary Airlift Squadron

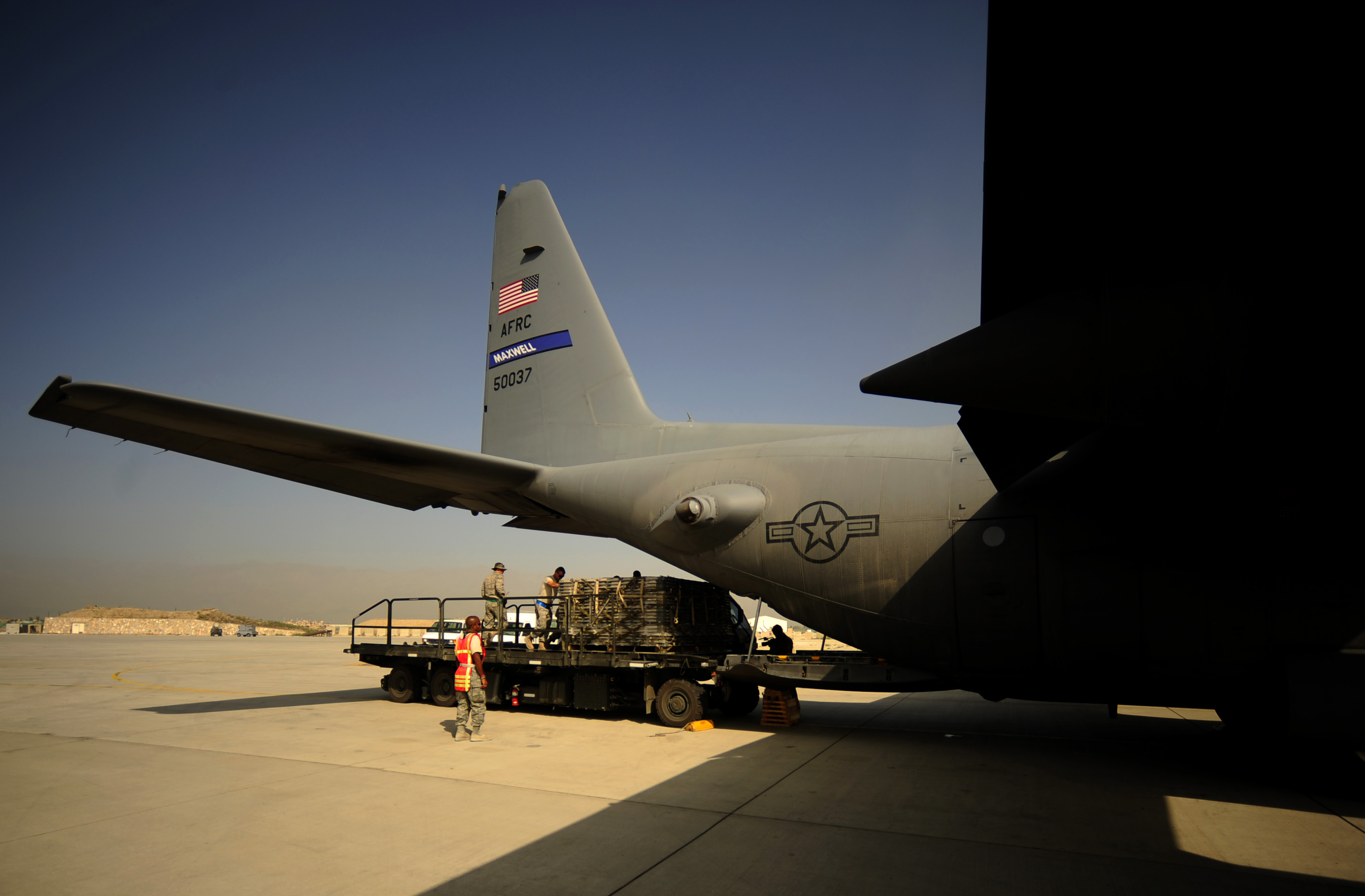
- Airmen load supplies onto a 746th Expeditionary Airlift Squadron C-130H Hercules (Note: The aircraft was at Bagram Air Base, Afghanistan in support of humanitarian relief efforts in Pakistan, 20 August 2010.)
- Active: 1942–1945; 1947–1949; 1952–1956; after 2002
- Country: United States
- Branch: United States Air Force
- Role: Airlift
- Part of: Air Combat Command
- Nickname: Blue-Nosed Mules
- Motto: Carrying The Load
- Engagements: Mediterranean Theater of Operations; Iraq War
- Decorations: Distinguished Unit Citation; Air Force Meritorious Unit Award; Air Force Outstanding Unit Award with Combat "V" Device; Air Force Outstanding Unit Award

Insignia
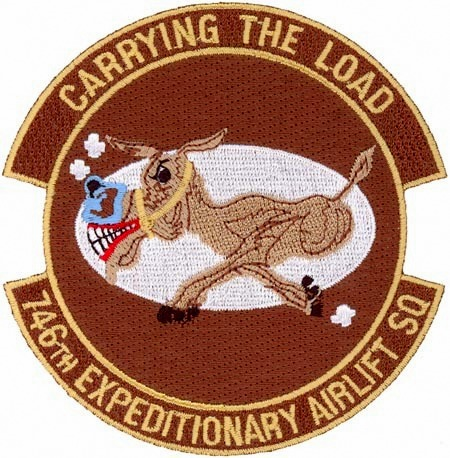
- 746th Expeditionary Airlift Squadron emblem

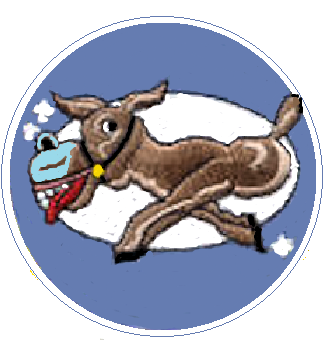
- 746th Troop Carrier Squadron emblem (Note: Approved, 9 September 1956. Description: On a sky blue disc, bordered white, edged of the first, over a white ellipse, a caricatured mule, shades of light brown, highlighted white; muzzle light blue, nostril, eye, hoofs black; teeth, eyeball, highlights on hoofs white; gums light red with snorting mad facial expression; the mule in racing position with white air clouds from his snorting nostrils & running hoofs.)

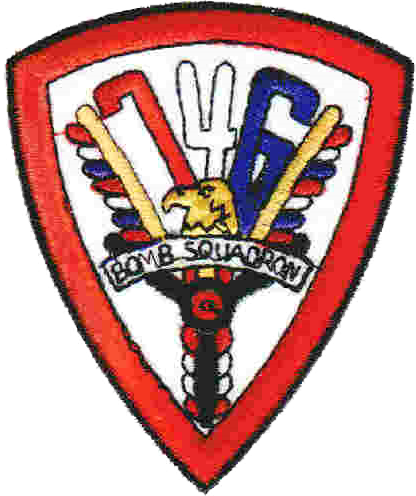
- 746th Bombardment Squadron emblem (World War II)

The 746th Expeditionary Airlift Squadron is a provisional United States Air Force unit. It is assigned to Air Combat Command to activate or inactivate as needed. Most recently, it operates Lockheed C-130 Hercules aircraft in theater airlift missions as part of the global war on terrorism.

The squadron was first activated as the 746th Bombardment Squadron in June 1943. After training in the United States, it deployed to the Mediterranean Theater of Operations, where it participated in the strategic bombing campaign against Germany. It earned two Distinguished Unit Citations for its combat operations. Following V-E Day, the squadron returned to the United States and began reorganizing as a very heavy bomber unit, but after the Japanese surrender, was inactivated in October 1945.

The squadron was reactivated in the reserve in 1947, but does not appear to have been fully equipped or manned. It was activated again in 1952 as the 746th Troop Carrier Squadron, when the 456th Troop Carrier Group replaced the 435th Troop Carrier Group, a reserve group that had been mobilized for the Korean War. It operated from Japan with elements of United States Air Force Security Service, performing special reconnaissance missions, until returning to the United States for inactivation in 1958.

It was converted to provisional status as the 746th Expeditionary Airlift Squadron in 2002.

== History ==
=== World War II ===
The squadron was first activated on 1 June 1943 as the 746th Bombardment Squadron at Wendover Field, Utah, where it was one of the four original squadrons of the 456th Bombardment Group and received its initial cadre. Shortly thereafter the squadron moved to Gowen Field, Idaho and began to train with Consolidated B-24 Liberator bombers. It completed its training in December 1943 after which it began moving to the Mediterranean Theater of Operations.

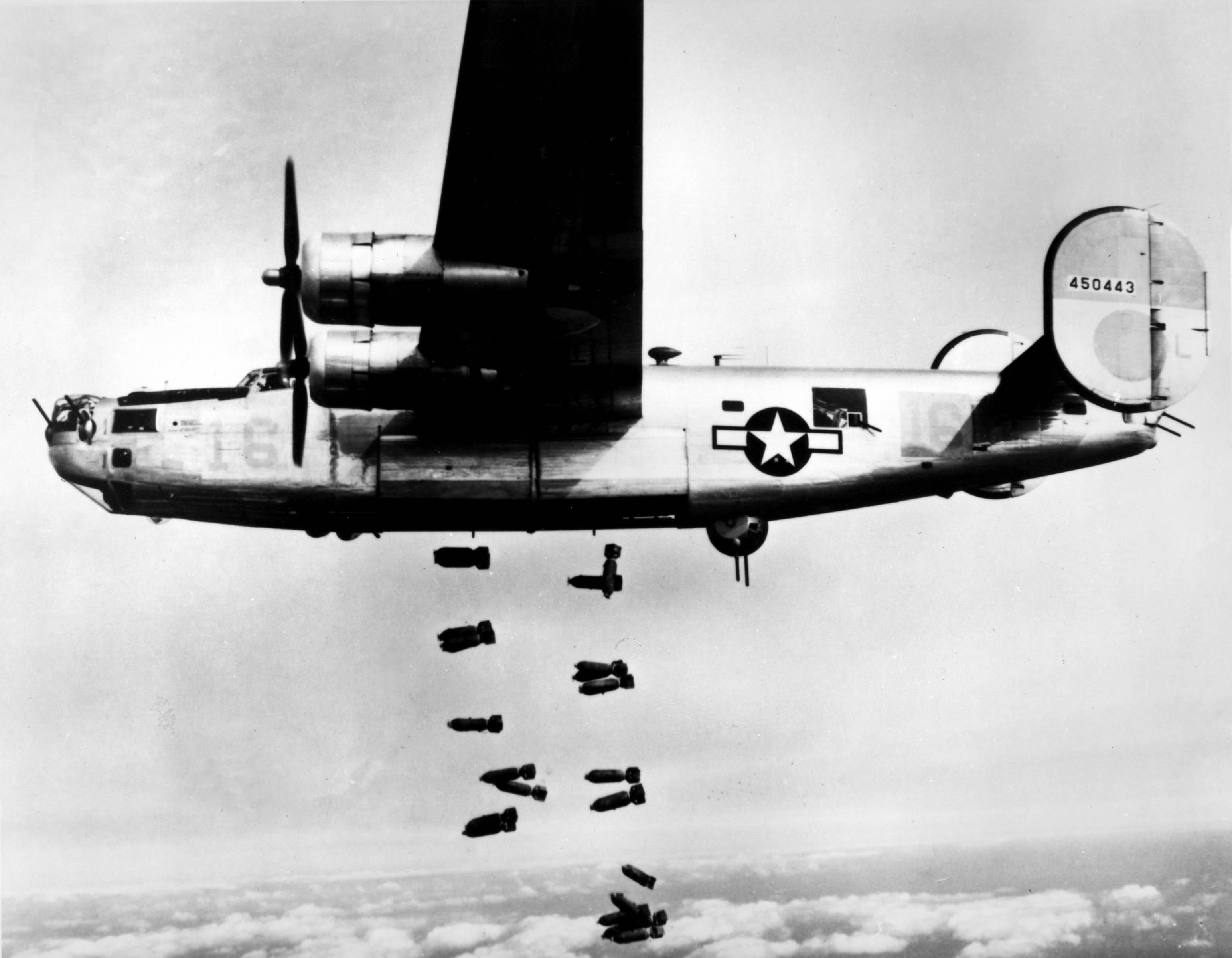
15th Air Force B-24 Liberator attacking a target

The squadron arrived in theater at Cerignola Airfield on 11 January 1944 and later that month moved to its combat station of Stornara Airfield, Italy. The squadron commenced combat operations the following month, primarily engaging in the strategic bombing campaign against Germany. Its early operations were conducted against airfields, aircraft factories, and railroad bridges in Italy, Austria and Romania. On 10 May 1944, the squadron targeted a manufacturing center at Wiener Neustadt, Austria, but adverse weather caused most of the attacking force to turn back before reaching the target. The 746th and the rest of the 456th Group proceeded to attack the target despite heavy interceptor opposition that was able to concentrate on defending against the group's Liberators. Its actions in this operation earned the squadron its first Distinguished Unit Citation (DUC).

Later, the squadron expanded its operations to include attacks on locomotive manufacturing plants, oil refineries, oil storage facilities and viaducts in France, Germany, Czechoslovakia, Hungary, and on the Balkan peninsula. On 2 July 1944, the squadron experienced severe fighter attacks while bombing oil facilities at Budapest, Hungary, for which it was awarded a second DUC.

During this time, the squadron was occasionally diverted from its strategic mission to carry out air support and air interdiction missions. From July through August 1944, it helped set the conditions for Operation Dragoon, the invasion of southern France. In the spring of 1945, it supported Operation Grapeshot, the offensive by the United States Fifth Army and British Eighth Army against remaining German forces in northern Italy.

Following V-E Day, the squadron airlifted supplies to airfields in northern Italy. It returned to the United States in July and began to reorganize as a very heavy bomber unit in preparation for operations in the Pacific. However, with the surrender of Japan, the squadron was inactivated on 17 October 1945.

=== Air Force reserve ===
The squadron was reactivated as a reserve unit in July 1947, under Air Defense Command (ADC) at McChord Field, Washington, where its training was supervised by ADC's 406th AAF Base Unit (later the 2345th Air Force Reserve Training Center). It was nominally a very heavy bomber unit, but according to air force historian Maurer Maurer, the squadron does not appear to have been fully manned or equipped with operational aircraft while a reserve unit. In 1948 Continental Air Command (ConAC) assumed responsibility for managing reserve and Air National Guard units from ADC. President Truman’s reduced 1949 defense budget required reductions in the number of units in the Air Force. ConAC also reorganized its reserve units under the wing base organization system in June 1949. As a result, the squadron was inactivated and its personnel and equipment were transferred to elements of the 302d Troop Carrier Wing, which was activated simultaneously.

=== Troop carrier operations ===
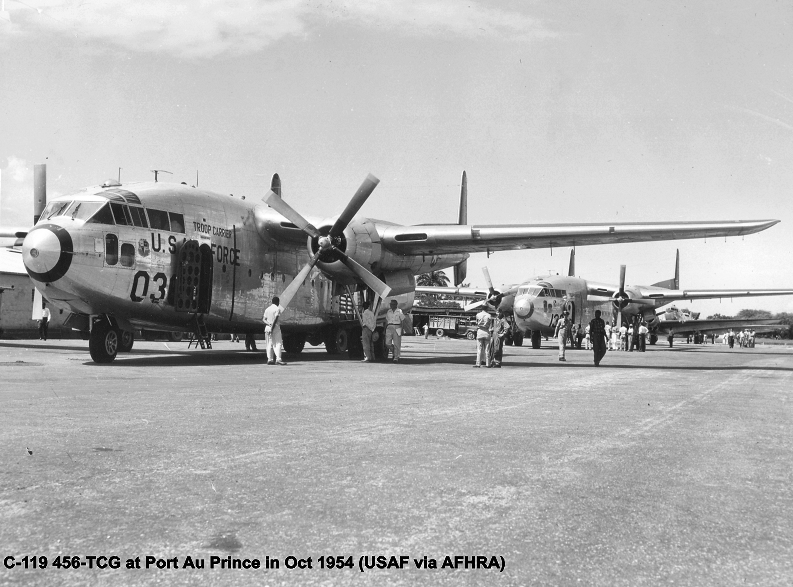
C-119 Flying Boxcars from the 456th Troop Carrier Group deployed to Port-au-Prince, Haiti, October 1954

In 1952, the squadron was redesignated the 746th Troop Carrier Squadron and activated at Miami International Airport, Florida, where it replaced the 78th Troop Carrier Squadron, a reserve unit that had been mobilized for the Korean War and which was returning to reserve status. The squadron and its Fairchild C-119 Flying Boxcars moved to Charleston Air Force Base, South Carolina in August 1953. It participated in numerous military exercises in the United States and overseas, primarily with airborne forces of the United States Army.

In March 1955, the 456th Troop Carrier Wing reorganized, and the squadron was assigned directly to wing headquarters as the 456th Group. All wing support organizations were inactivated at this time, while the squadron formed a detachment with eight C-119L aircraft. In October, the squadron moved with the wing to Shiroi Air Base, Japan, but the flying detachments of the wing were located at various points between Okinawa and Alaska. The squadron took part in Project Drag Net, recovering instrument packages from high altitude research or reconnaissance balloons. (Note: The project, or aspects of it, operated under various code names: Project Genetrix, WS-119L, and Project Moby Dick. Project Drag Net apparently referred to the training portion of the operation and was an unclassified name.) The project was terminated in May 1956 due to its low success rate, although the squadron earned an Air Force Outstanding Unit Award for its participation. The squadron returned to the United States and Ardmore Air Force Base, Oklahoma, where it was inactivated in July 1956 and its assets transferred to the 341st Troop Carrier Squadron.

=== Air expeditionary unit ===
The squadron was converted to provisional status as the 746th Expeditionary Airlift Squadron in 2002. It was activated in 2004 as a Lockheed C-130 Hercules airlift squadron as part of the global war on terrorism. It is a "rainbow" unit, composed of crews and planes from active duty, reserve, and Air National Guard units. The squadron, as recently as 2017 was responsible for transporting personnel and materiel to support Operation Inherent Resolve.

== Lineage ==
- Constituted as the 746th Bombardment Squadron (Heavy) on 14 May 1943

Activated on 1 June 1943
Redesignated 746th Bombardment Squadron, Heavy c. 5 March 1944
Redesignated 746th Bombardment Squadron, Very Heavy on 5 August 1945
Inactivated on 17 October 1945

- Activated in the reserve on 12 July 1947

Inactivated on 27 June 1949

- Redesignated 746th Troop Carrier Squadron, Medium on 15 October 1952

Activated on 1 December 1952
Inactivated on 9 July 1956

- Redesignated 746th Expeditionary Airlift Squadron converted to a provisional unit on 12 June 2002

Activated 2004

=== Assignments ===
- 456th Bombardment Group, 1 June 1943 – 17 October 1945
- 456th Bombardment Group, 12 July 1947 – 27 June 1949
- 456th Troop Carrier Group, 1 December 1952
- 456th Troop Carrier Wing, 1 March 1955 – 9 July 1956
- Air Mobility Command to activate or inactivate as needed, 12 June 2002
- Air Combat Command to activate or inactivate as needed, 19 March 2003

379th Expeditionary Operations Group, c. 2004 – present

=== Stations ===
- Wendover Field, Utah, 1 June 1943
- Gowen Field, Idaho, 14 July 1943
- Bruning Army Air Field, Nebraska, 2 August 1943
- Kearns Army Air Base, Utah, 9 September 1943
- Muroc Army Air Field, California, 2 October–4 December 1943
- Cerignola Airfield, Italy, 11 January 1944
- Stornara Airfield, Italy, 25 January 1944 – 19 July 1945
- Sioux Falls Army Air Field, South Dakota, 1 August 1945
- Smoky Hill Army Air Field, Kansas, 17 August-17 October 1945
- McChord Field (later McChord Air Force Base), Washington, 12 July 1947 – 27 June 1949
- Miami International Airport, Florida, 1 December 1952
- Charleston Air Force Base, South Carolina, 15 August 1953
- Shiroi Air Base, Japan, 10 November 1955
- Ardmore Air Force Base, Oklahoma, 17 May–9 July 1956
- Al Udeid Air Base, c. 2004 – present

=== Aircraft ===
- Consolidated B-24 Liberator, 1943–1945
- Boeing B-29 Superfortress, 1945
- Fairchild C-119 Flying Boxcar, 1952–1956
- Lockheed C-130 Hercules, 2004 – present

=== Awards and campaigns ===
Award streamer	Award	Dates	Notes
	Distinguished Unit Citation	10 May 1944	Wiener Neustadt, Austria 746th Bombardment Squadron
	Distinguished Unit Citation	2 July 1944	Budapest, Hungary 746th Bombardment Squadron
	Air Force Meritorious Unit Award	1 June 2005 – 31 May 2006	746th Expeditionary Airlift Squadron
	Air Force Meritorious Unit Award	1 June 2010 – 31 May 2011	746th Expeditionary Airlift Squadron
	Air Force Meritorious Unit Award	1 June 2011 – 31 May 2012	746th Expeditionary Airlift Squadron
	Air Force Meritorious Unit Award	1 June 2015 – 31 May 2016	746th Expeditionary Airlift Squadron
	Air Force Outstanding Unit Award with Combat "V" Device	6 May 2003 – 31 August 2003	746th Expeditionary Airlift Squadron
	Air Force Outstanding Unit Award	1 April 1955 – 20 March 1956	746th Troop Carrier Squadron

Campaign Streamer	Campaign	Dates	Notes
	Air Offensive, Europe	11 January 1944 – 5 June 1944	746th Bombardment Squadron
	Air Combat, EAME Theater	11 January 1944 – 11 May 1945	746th Bombardment Squadron
	Naples-Foggia	11 January 1944 – 21 January 1944	746th Bombardment Squadron
	Anzio	22 January 1944 – 24 May 1944	746th Bombardment Squadron
	Rome-Arno	22 January 1944 – 9 September 1944	746th Bombardment Squadron
	Central Europe	22 March 1944 – 21 May 1945	746th Bombardment Squadron
	Southern France	15 August 1944 – 14 September 1944	746th Bombardment Squadron
	North Apennines	10 September 1944 – 4 April 1945	746th Bombardment Squadron
	Rhineland	15 September 1944 – 21 March 1945	746th Bombardment Squadron
	Po Valley	3 April 1945 – 8 May 1945	746th Bombardment Squadron (Note: Air Forces Central Command has awarded campaign credit for several campaigns to the "746th Air Refueling Squadron." It is not clear if this is a typographical error for awards to this unit.)

== See also ==
- Project Skyhook
- B-24 Liberator units of the United States Army Air Forces
- List of C-130 Hercules operators
