= Thomas W. Steed =

United States Air Force officer

Thomas Webster Steed
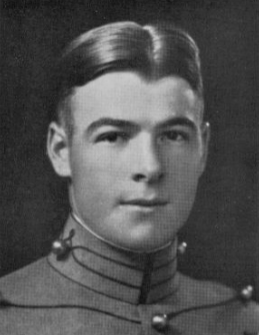
- At West Point in 1928
- Born: October 18, 1904; Mineral Bluff, Georgia, U.S.
- Died: October 21, 1973 (aged 69); Manchester, New Hampshire, U.S.
- Military career
- Allegiance: United States of America
- Branch: United States Air Force
- Service years: 1930-1954
- Rank: Colonel
- Commands: 456th Bomb Group; 91st Strategic Reconnaissance Wing; 301st Bomb Wing; 4th Air Division, SAC
- Conflicts: World War II
- Awards: Silver Star; Legion of Merit; Distinguished Flying Cross (2); Army Commendation Medal (3); Air Medal (7)

Thomas Webster Steed (October 18, 1904 – October 21, 1973) was a professional U.S. military officer in the United States Army Air Corps, Army Air Forces, and Air Force. During World War II he commanded the 456th Bomb Group (Heavy) throughout its combat service, one of only three bomb group commanders to train a group, command it overseas, and return it to the United States. (Note: The others were Col. Paul L. Barton (483rd BG, 15th AF) and Col. Albert H. Shower (467th BG, 8th AF).)

== Background ==
Steed was born October 18, 1904, at Mineral Bluff, Fannin County, Georgia. His family later moved to nearby Etowah, Tennessee. Steed was educated in the public schools, and attended both Tennessee Military Academy and the University of Tennessee before entering the United States Military Academy in 1923 on a senatorial appointment. His initial efforts were unsuccessful and he was dropped from the academy for academic deficiencies, particularly in required English, during the second half of his plebe year. Steed moved to New York City and worked as a digger in the building of the 14th Street Tunnel under the East River. Steed was reinstated in the autumn of 1924 as a plebe and successfully completed the four-year course as a member of the Class of 1928. Nicknamed "Sadie" and "Red", he was a popular cadet though older than most of his peers.

== Military service ==
2nd Lt. Steed underwent flight training at the primary school, Brooks Field, and advanced flying school, Kelly Field, Texas, receiving his wings in March, 1930. His first unit assignment was with the 99th Observation Squadron (9th Observation Group) at Mitchel Field, New York, from April 1930 to December 1932. In addition to the limited flying, he performed collateral duties as mess officer, armament officer, and squadron adjutant, and attended Cooks and Bakers Training School at Fort Slocum, New York.

From January 1933 to April, 1936, Lt. Steed was based at Clark Field, Philippine Islands, with the 3rd Pursuit Squadron. In 1934 he flew escort for the first non-stop flight from Tokyo to Manila. Steed was promoted to first lieutenant in October 1934.

In May, 1936, Steed transferred to the 32nd Bombardment Squadron, 19th Bombardment Group, March Field, California. He remained with the group to February 1941, also serving in the 93rd Bombardment and 38th Reconnaissance Squadrons. He also had temporary duty as a student at the Air Corps Tactical School, Maxwell Field, Alabama, in the second of its "short courses" held in 1939-40.

While assigned to the 19th Bomb Group he received promotions to captain (June 1938) and major (February 1941). On February 10, 1941, he was named commander of the 30th Heavy Bomb Group, one of a dozen new groups created in January 1941 in preparation for World War II. While commanding the 30th Group, Steed was promoted to lieutenant colonel (January 1942), and to colonel (March 1942). Major Steed received the Distinguished Flying Cross in May 1941, as a member of the first flight of B-17s from Hamilton Field, California, to Hickam Field, Hawaii.

=== World War II service ===
From August 1942 to July 1943 Colonel Steed was assigned as Chief of Staff IV Bomber Command, Headquarters Fourth Air Force, San Francisco, receiving the Legion of Merit. He commanded the Bomber Command for several days in November 1942, in a caretaker status. From this assignment he was selected to command the 456th Bomb Group.

Colonel Steed took command of the 456th at Gowen Field, Idaho, on July 14, 1943. In five months of training he supervised the development of the group from a small cadre of transferred personnel without equipment to a unit of 2,300 officers and men and 61 B-24 Liberator bombers. Included in the training period were four changes of station that forced a reduction of phase three training, normally three months in length, to a month at Muroc AAF, California.

At Muroc the 456th had only half the number of aircraft it required for training and was unable to secure equipment for high altitude bombing and gunnery practice which were necessary to prepare the crews for combat. When the Preparation for Overseas Movement inspectors asked Colonel Steed to certify his group as ready for combat, Colonel Steed replied that, as a professional airman, he could not comply. According to the group history of the 456th, Steed added that he knew the group would be sent anyway, that its members wanted to get into combat, and that the 456th would "fight one hell of a war." Despite efforts to have him change his position, the 456th was sent overseas without POM certification.

The 456th, based at Stornara, Italy, was assigned to the 304th Bomb Wing, headquartered at Cerignola, as part of the Fifteenth Air Force. There it flew 249 combat missions from February 10, 1944, to April 25, 1945, with Steed as its only commander. On its final mission the 456th achieved the only 100% bombing accuracy by a Fifteenth Air Force group (and only the second in Europe). The group earned two Distinguished Unit Citations and seven campaign streamers. Its members were awarded one Distinguished Service Cross, 19 Silver Stars, 215 Distinguished Flying Crosses, over 2,000 Air Medals. While at Stornara, Colonel Steed met and married his wife, Julia, a captain and army nurse with the 34th Field Hospital, Cerignola. Colonel Steed returned to the United States in May 1945.

=== USAF service ===
His post-war assignments for the USAAF and after September 18, 1947, the USAF were:

- Base commander, Marianna Army Air Force Base, Florida (July 1945 to April 1946)
- Senior instructor, Massachusetts Air National Guard (April 1946 to August 1948)
- Student, Air War College, Maxwell AFB, Alabama (August 1948 to July 1949)
- Commander, 91st Strategic Reconnaissance Wing, Barksdale AFB, Louisiana (August 5, 1949, to July 19, 1950)
- Commander, 301st Bomb Wing (Medium), Barksdale AFB (April 1, 1950, to February 10, 1951)

(The headquarters of the 91st SRW and 301st BW were integrated after April 1950 and Col. Steed commanded both simultaneously, rotating command tours with Col. H.M. Wade)

- Commander, 4th Air Division, Strategic Air Command, Barksdale AFB (February 10, 1951, to May 22, 1951)
- Base Commander, Larson Air Force Base, Washington
- Base Commander, Hamilton Air Force Base, California

Colonel Steed medically retired from the Air Force on October 31, 1952. In July 1950, Colonel Steed had been severely injured during an RB-50 training flight in England when a crewman went berserk on the flight deck of Steed's aircraft. During the attempt to subdue the airman Colonel Steed was struck on the head with a wrench, causing a bone splinter that eventually forced his early retirement.

Following his retirement, Colonel Steed resided in Pelham, New Hampshire, and became a contract realtor and an appraiser for the Veterans' Administration. Colonel Steed died October 21, 1973, at the Veterans Hospital in Manchester, New Hampshire, from meningioma.

== Awards and decorations ==
- Command pilot

Silver Star
Legion of Merit
Distinguished Flying Cross (with oak leaf cluster)
Air Medal (with six oak leaf clusters)
Army Commendation Medal (with two oak leaf clusters)

American Defense Service Medal

American Campaign Medal

European-African-Middle Eastern Campaign Medal (with eight battle stars)

World War II Victory Medal
