= 456th Bombardment Wing =

456th Bombardment Wing, Heavy
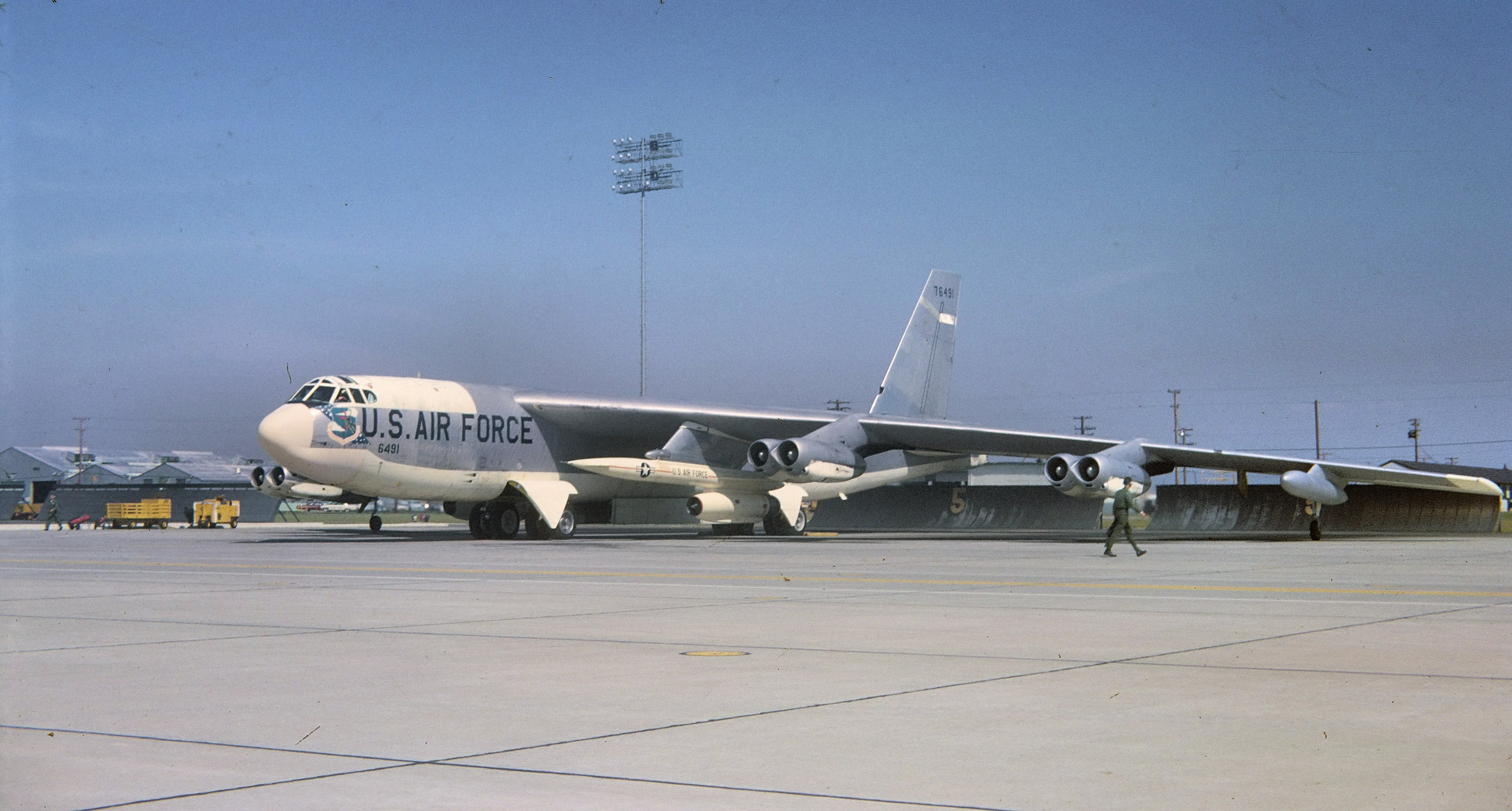
- 456th Bombardment Wing Boeing B-52 with GAM-77 Hound Dog (Note: Aircraft is Boeing B-52G Stratofortress serial 57-6491 at Beale AFB)
- Active: 1952–1956, 1963–1975
- Country: United States
- Branch: United States Air Force
- Role: bombardment and air refueling
- Part of: Strategic Air Command
- Decorations: Air Force Outstanding Unit Award

Insignia
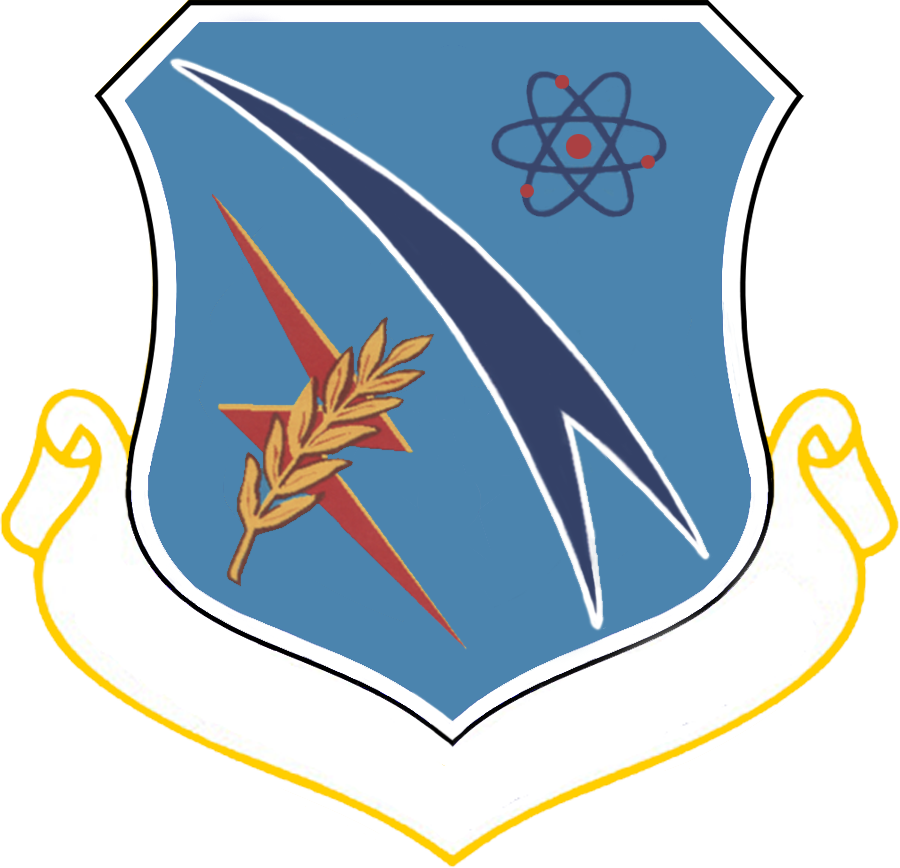
- 4126th Strategic Wing and 456th Bombardment Wing emblem (Note: The 456th Strategic Aerospace Wing continued to use the 4126th Strategic Wing emblem as part of its bestowed honors, but did not obtain official approval of the emblem until 23 August 1972 after it had been redesignated the 456th Bombardment Wing. Ravenstein, Combat Wings, pp. 251–252)

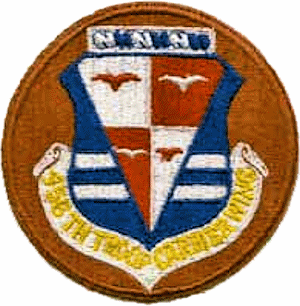
- 456th Troop Carrier Wing emblem (approved 7 July 1953)

The 456th Bombardment Wing is an inactive United States Air Force unit. It was last assigned to the 14th Air Division of Strategic Air Command at Beale Air Force Base, California, where it was inactivated on 30 September 1975. The wing's predecessor was the 456th Bombardment Group, a World War II United States Army Air Forces combat organization that flew from Italy while assigned to Fifteenth Air Force. It earned two Distinguished Unit Citations for valor in combat and participated in the strategic bombing campaign against oil production targets including those near Ploiești, Romania, attacks that resulted in high bomber losses. The group also served as a troop carrier unit in the Air Force Reserve from 1947 to 1949 and as the flying element of the wing from 1952 to 1955.

The wing was activated in 1952 as the 456th Troop Carrier Wing, Medium, operating Fairchild C-119 Flying Boxcar transports. In the fall of 1955 the wing deployed to Japan, where it supported reconnaissance operations by recovering capsules carried across the Soviet Union by high-altitude balloons. The wing returned to the United States and was inactivated in July 1956, with its personnel forming the cadre for the 419th Troop Carrier Group, which was activated the same day.

The wing was redesignated the 456th Strategic Aerospace Wing and was activated at Beale Air Force Base, California in February 1963. It flew Boeing B-52 Stratofortress bombers and Boeing KC-135 Stratotanker air refueling aircraft, and also commanded a HGM-25A Titan I squadron until 1965. Although it operated no intercontinental ballistic missiles after then, it was not until July 1972 that the wing was redesignated the 456th Bombardment Wing. The wing was inactivated in September 1975 and its personnel, equipment, and mission transferred to the 17th Bombardment Wing, which moved to Beale on paper from Wright-Patterson Air Force Base, Ohio.

== History ==
See 456th Bombardment Group page for additional history

=== 456th Troop Carrier Wing ===
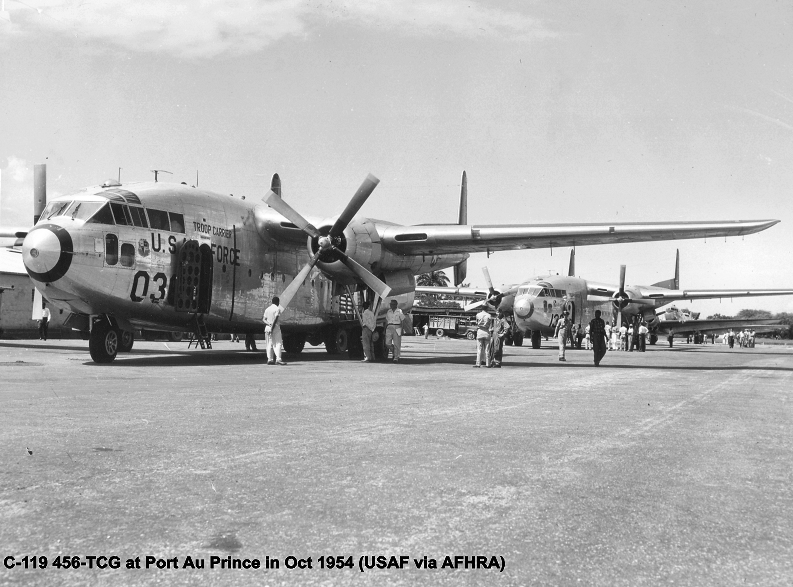
C-119 Flying Boxcars from the 456th Troop Carrier Group deployed to Port-au-Prince, Haiti, October 1954

The 456th Troop Carrier Wing, Medium was activated in October 1952 and assigned to Tactical Air Command. It was stationed at Miami International Airport, Florida, where it replaced the 435th Troop Carrier Wing, which was an Air Force Reserve unit called to active duty for the Korean War, assuming the 435th's mission, personnel, and equipment. (Note: The 435th Wing returned to the reserves and took over the mission, personnel and equipment of the reserve 482d Troop Carrier Wing at Miami. Ravenstein, Combat Wings, pp. 231–231.) The wing flew Fairchild C-119 Flying Boxcar troop carrier transports. The wing moved to Charleston Air Force Base, South Carolina on 25 July 1953. Until 1955 It participated in numerous tactical exercise in the United States and overseas, mostly in conjunction with Army airborne forces. The wing was reorganized on 1 March 1955 when its tactical group and all support components were inactivated.

When reorganized the wing assumed control over three tactical squadrons plus three squadron-size detachments manned for self-sufficient operations and having eight specially modified C-119s. The wing headquarters moved to Shiroi Air Base, Japan while its components were located in other areas of Japan, Okinawa, the Aleutian Islands and mainland Alaska. Under the control of the 1st Air Division it participated in Project Drag Net, part of Weapons System WS119L. The wing's task was to perform aerial recovery of high-altitude balloon-borne instrument packages. A mobile radio squadron from United States Air Force Security Service was attached to the wing for this mission. WS119L payloads consisted of an AN/DMQ-1, which was a gondola containing two cameras. Between January and February 1956, 448 balloons were launched under this program from locations in Scotland, Norway, Germany and Turkey. Most came down prematurely, but about 80 reached the recovery zones after overflying the Soviet Union. 44 successful midair recoveries were made of the camera-bearing gondolas. While the program was terminated because of the low success rate, the 456th was awarded an Air Force Outstanding Unit Award for its participation in this program.

The wing returned to the US and Ardmore Air Force Base, Oklahoma on 25 May 1956, where it was attached to the 463d Troop Carrier Wing until it was inactivated on 9 July and its personnel used to form the 419th Troop Carrier Group, which was simultaneously activated.

=== 456th Strategic Aerospace Wing ===
4126th Strategic Wing

The origins of the 4126 Strategic Wing can be traced to 1 July 1956 when Continental Air Command transferred Beale Air Force Base California to Strategic Air Command (SAC) which put Beale under the control of the 4126th Air Base Squadron to prepare the base for SAC's plan to disperse its Boeing B-52 Stratofortress heavy bombers over a larger number of bases, thus making it more difficult for the Soviet Union to knock out the entire fleet with a surprise first strike. As SAC's strength at Beale expanded, the 4126th became the 4126th Combat Support Group on 8 February 1959 and was assigned along with the 856th Medical Group to the newly organized 4126th Strategic Wing, which was assigned to the 14th Air Division. The wing gained its first operational squadron on 1 April 1959 when the 903d Air Refueling Squadron, flying Boeing KC-135 Stratotankers was activated at Beale.

The wing became fully organized on 26 October 1959 when the 31st Bombardment Squadron (BS), consisting of 15 Boeing B-52 Stratofortresses moved to Beale from Travis Air Force Base, California where it had been one of the three squadrons of the 5th Bombardment Wing along with the 63d Aviation Depot Squadron whose mission was to oversee the wing's special weapons. Starting in 1960, one third of the wing's aircraft were maintained on fifteen-minute alert, fully fueled, armed and ready for combat to reduce vulnerability to a Soviet missile strike. This was increased to half the wing's aircraft in 1962. The 4126th (and later the 456th) continued to maintain an alert commitment until inactivation. The wing's parent 14th Air Division also moved to Beale and the 4126th became responsible to provide support to the division as well as the San Francisco Air Defense Sector of Air Defense Command, which activated at Beale in 1959. The wing added the Intercontinental ballistic missile mission on 1 February 1961, when the 851st Strategic Missile Squadron equipped with HGM-25A Titan I missiles was activated and assigned to the wing. In 1962, the wing's bombers began to be equipped with the GAM-77 Hound Dog and the GAM-72 Quail air-launched cruise missiles, The 4126th Airborne Missile Maintenance Squadron was activated in November to maintain these missiles

However, SAC Strategic Wings could not carry a permanent history or lineage and SAC looked for a way to make its Strategic Wings permanent.

456th Strategic Aerospace Wing

In 1962, in order to perpetuate the lineage of many currently inactive bombardment units with illustrious World War II records, Headquarters SAC received authority from Headquarters USAF to discontinue its Major Command controlled (MAJCON) strategic wings that were equipped with combat aircraft and to activate Air Force controlled (AFCON) units, most of which were inactive at the time which could carry a lineage and history. (Note: MAJCON units could not carry a permanent history or lineage. Ravenstein, Guide to Air Force Lineage and Honors, p. 12) As a result, the 4126th Wing was replaced by the newly redesignated 456th Strategic Aerospace Wing, which assumed its mission, personnel, and equipment on 1 February 1963. (Note: The 456th Wing continued, through temporary bestowal, the history, and honors of the World War II 456th Bombardment Group. It was also entitled to retain the honors (but not the history or lineage) of the 4126th and did so by adopting the 4126th's emblem as its own. This temporary bestowal ended when the wing was inactivated in 1975.) In the same way the 744th Bombardment Squadron, one of the unit's World War II historical bomb squadrons, replaced the 31st BS. The 856th Medical Group, 63d Munitions Maintenance Squadron and the 903d Air Refueling Squadron were reassigned to the 456th. Component support units were replaced by units with numerical designation of the newly established wing. Under the Dual Deputate organization, (Note: Under this plan flying and missile squadrons reported to the wing Deputy Commander for Operations and maintenance squadrons reported to the wing Deputy Commander for Maintenance) all flying and maintenance squadrons were directly assigned to the wing, so no operational group element was activated. The 4126th's support group and maintenance squadrons were replaced by ones with the 456th numerical designation of the newly established wing. Each of the new units assumed the personnel, equipment, and mission of its predecessor.

The 456th Wing continued the mission of strategic bombardment and missile readiness training. The wing's bombardment and air refueling squadrons frequently deployed aircraft and crews to meet USAF requirements, often having nearly all of the resources of the wing scattered around the world at various operating locations. In 1963 the 456th Strategic Aerospace Wing was featured as the fictional 904th Strategic Aerospace Wing in the Hollywood film production A Gathering of Eagles.

In 1964, the 903d was taken off its alert commitment to devote all its resourced to a "higher priority mission" which it had been performing for some months. Its performance of this mission earned it an Air Force Outstanding Unit Award for the period 1 July 1963 to 30 June 1964. (Note: Although the wing itself received no awards while stationed at Beale, its 903d Air Refueling Squadron earned a second AFOUA for the period 1 July 1966 – 30 June 1967 and the subordinate 456th Combat Support Group, its assigned squadrons, and the 856th Medical Group earned one for 1 January 1966 – 30 June 1967. AF Pamphlet 900-2, p. 476.) It became apparent that the wing was once again to be associated with reconnaissance missions when the 4200th Strategic Reconnaissance Wing, flying SR-71s was organized at Beale at the start of 1965.

Also in 1965, the 851st Strategic Missile Squadron inactivated as SAC transitioned its missile force to the LGM-30 Minuteman missile. Recognizing the wing mission to support both a bombardment squadron and a reconnaissance squadron with air refueling support, the wing added a second refueling squadron, the 9th Air Refueling Squadron at the start of 1970.

456th Bombardment Wing

In July 1972 the wing was redesignated the 456th Bombardment Wing, Heavy. The 456th was inactivated on 30 September 1975, and its mission, equipment and personnel were transferred to the 17th Bombardment Wing, which moved on paper to Beale from Wright-Patterson Air Force Base, Ohio. This was part of a consolidation of resources after the Vietnam War due to budget cuts, and the desire by HQ SAC to keep a more distinguished unit on active duty.

== Lineage ==
- Constituted as 456th Troop Carrier Wing, Medium on 15 October 1952

Activated on 1 December 1952
Inactivated on 9 July 1956

- Redesignated 456th Strategic Aerospace Wing on 15 November 1962

Activated on 15 November 1962 (not organized)
Organized on 1 February 1963
Redesignated 456th Bombardment Wing, Heavy on 1 July 1972
Inactivated on 30 September 1975

=== Assignments ===
- Eighteenth Air Force, 1 December 1952 – 9 July 1956 (attached to 1st Air Division c. 22 April 1955 – 26 March 1956, 463d Troop Carrier Wing after 10 May 1956)
- Strategic Air Command, 15 November 1962 (not organized)
- 14th Strategic Aerospace Division, 1 February 1963
- 47th Air Division, 30 June 1971
- 14th Air Division, 1 October 1972 – 30 September 1975

=== Components ===
Groups

- 456th Air Base Group (later 456th Combat Support Group), 1 December 1952 – 1 March 1955, 1 February 1963 – 30 September 1975
- 456th Maintenance & Supply Group, 1 December 1952 – 1 March 1955
- 456th Medical Group (later 456th Tactical Infirmary), 1 December 1952 – 1 March 1955
- 456th Troop Carrier Group, 1 December 1952 – 1 March 1955
- 856th Medical Group, 1 February 1963 – 1 January 1965

Squadrons

- 9th Air Refueling Squadron: 1 January 1970 – 30 September 1975
- 744th Troop Carrier Squadron (later 744th Bombardment Squadron): 1 March 1955 – 9 July 1956; 1 February 1963 – 30 September 1975
- 745th Troop Carrier Squadron: 1 March 1955 – 9 July 1956
- 746th Troop Carrier Squadron: 1 March 1955 – 9 July 1956
- 851st Strategic Missile Squadron: 1 February 1963 – 25 March 1965
- 903d Air Refueling Squadron: 1 February 1963 – 30 September 1975
- 63d Munitions Maintenance Squadron: 1 February 1963 – 30 September 1975
- 456th Airborne Missile Maintenance Squadron: 1 February 1963 – 30 September 1975
- 456th Armament & Electronics Maintenance Squadron (later 456th Avionics Maintenance Squadron): 1 February 1963 – 30 September 1975
- 456th Field Maintenance Squadron: 1 February 1963 – 30 September 1975
- 456th Supply Squadron: 1 February 1963 – 1 July 1963
- 6926th Radio Squadron, Mobile: (attached c. 10 November 1954 – 26 March 1956
- Detachment 1, 456th Bombardment Wing: 1 January 1973 – 30 September 1975
- Detachment 1, 744th Troop Carrier Squadron: (attached 14 February 1955 – 9 July 1956)
- Detachment 1, 745th Troop Carrier Squadron: (attached 14 February 1955 – 9 July 1956)
- Detachment 1, 746th Troop Carrier Squadron: (attached 14 February 1955 – 9 July 1956)

=== Stations ===
- McChord Air Force Base, Washington, 12 July 1947 – 27 June 1949
- Miami International Airport, Florida, 1 December 1952
- Charleston Air Force Base, South Carolina, 25 July 1953 – 16 October 1955
- Shiroi Air Base, Japan, 10 November 1955 – 10 May 1956
- Ardmore Air Force Base, Oklahoma, 25 May – 9 July 1956
- Beale Air Force Base, California, 1 February 1963 – 30 September 1975

=== Aircraft and missiles ===
- Fairchild C-119 Flying Boxcar, 1 December 1952 – 9 July 1956
- Boeing B-52G Stratofortress, 15 November 1962 – 30 September 1975
- Boeing KC-135 Stratotanker, 15 November 1962 – 30 September 1975
- HGM-25A Titan I, 15 November 1962 – 1965

=== Awards ===
Award streamer	Award	Dates	Notes
	Air Force Outstanding Unit Award	1 April 1955 – 20 March 1956	456th Troop Carrier Group

The wing was also entitled by temporary bestowal to display the two Distinguished Unit Citations and campaign ribbons earned by the 456th Bombardment Group

== See also ==
- List of B-52 Units of the United States Air Force
- United States aerial reconnaissance of the Soviet Union
- Project Moby Dick
- Project Genetrix
