= 456th Bombardment Group =

456th Bombardment Group (Heavy)
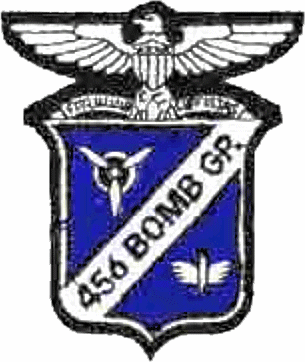
- 456th Bombardment Group Emblem
- Active: 1943–1945; 1947–1949; 1952–1955
- Country: United States
- Branch: United States Air Force
- Role: Heavy bombardment
- Size: 50–60 B-24 aircraft, 2000 personnel
- Nickname: Steed's Flying Colts
- Engagements: Mediterranean Theater of Operations
- Decorations: Distinguished Unit Citation

Activated in June 1943 as a heavy bombardment group. Trained with B-24 Liberators for duty overseas. Moved to Italy, December 1943 – January 1944. Began combat with Fifteenth Air Force in February 1944, operating chiefly against strategic targets until late in April 1945. Early operations included attacks against such objectives as marshalling yards, aircraft factories, railroad bridges, and airdromes in Italy, Austria, and Romania.

Received a Distinguished Unit Citation for performance at Wiener Neustadt, Austria on 10 May 1944: when other groups turned back because of adverse weather, the 456th proceeded to the target and, withstanding repeated attacks by enemy interceptors, bombed the manufacturing center. Helped to prepare the way for and supported the invasion of Southern France during July and August 1944. At the same time, expanded previous operations to include attacks on oil refineries and storage facilities, locomotive works, and viaducts in France, Germany, Czechoslovakia, Hungary, Austria, and the Balkans.

Received second DUC for a mission in Hungary on 2 July 1944 when the group braved severe fighter attacks and antiaircraft fire to bomb oil facilities at Budapest. In April 1945 bombed gun positions, bridges, roads, depots, and rail lines to support US Fifth and British Eighth Army in their advance through Italy. Transported supplies to airfields in northern Italy after V-E Day. Returned to the US in July 1945.

The 456th relocated to Smoky Hill Army Air Field, Salina, Kansas, on 17 August 1945. Put under control of Second Air Force, for conversion to a B-29 Superfortress group and operations against Japan, and re-designated 456th Bombardment Group, Very Heavy. The Pacific War ended before the conversion was completed, however, and the group was inactivated on 17 October 1945.

See 456th Bombardment Wing page for additional lineage and history

The 456th Bomb Group (Heavy) was an air combat unit of the United States Army Air Forces during the Second World War. A "heavy bombardment group," the 456th operated B-24 Liberator aircraft and was known unofficially as "Steed's Flying Colts," after its commander.

The 456th Bomb Group flew 249 bombing missions from Italy while assigned to the Fifteenth Air Force. Its members earned two Presidential Unit Citations for valor in combat and participated extensively in the strategic bombing campaign against oil production targets including Ploieşti, Romania, that resulted in high bomber losses.

Inactivated at the end of the war and allotted to the Air Force Reserve, the group was reactivated twice as a bomb and troop carrier group, and later had its lineage and history bestowed on a like-numbered wing of the United States Air Force.

== Organization of the 456th Bomb Group (H) ==
The 456th Bomb Group (Heavy) was created ("constituted") on 14 May 1943, by Special Order of the Second Air Force as a bomber unit planned for future deployment to the Eighth Air Force in the United Kingdom.

Group Commanders of the 456th Bomb Group:

- Col. Thomas W. Steed (14 July 1943 – 19 May 1945),
- Lt. Col. Robert C Whipple, (19 May 1945 – 30 August 1945),
- Col. George E. Henry, (31 August 1945 – 3 September 1945),
- Col. John W White, (4 September 1945 – 17 October 1945).

Deputy Commander Lt.Col. Russell was in temporary command from July – October 1944, in the absence of Col. Steed.

Deputy Group Commanders (air echelon commanders): Lt.Col. Harmon Lampley Jr. (3 September 1943 – 28 March 1944); Lt.Col. Joseph G. Russell (1 June 1944 – unk); Lt.Col. Chester R. Ladd (1945—unk).

Executive officers (ground echelon commanders): Lt.Col. Walter C. Phillips (14 July 1943 – November 1944); Lt.Col. Leonard A. Weissinger (November 1944 – June 1945)

Four heavy bomb squadrons were constituted at the same time and assigned to the group:

- 744th Bomb Squadron (H)
  - Commanders: Capt. John R. Sinclair (14 July 1943 – 9 March 1944), Major Robert L. Reid (10 March 1944 – August 1944), Major Joseph N. Jacobucci (August 1944 – unk), Capt. William S. Rawls (dates unknown)
- 745th Bomb Squadron (H)
  - Commanders: Capt. William H. McKee (14 July 1943 – ?), Major Louis M. Abernathy (dates unk), Lt.Col. David H. Cissna (October 1944-unknown), Major John S. Chandler (dates unknown)
- 746th Bomb Squadron (H)
  - Commanders: Major Paul T. Golden (14 July 1943 – March 1944), Capt. Frederick W. Hyde (March 1944—unknown), Lt.Col. Samuel W. Parks (dates unknown)
- 747th Bomb Squadron (H)
  - Commanders: Major Benjamin F. Kelly (14 July 1943 – unknown), Capt. Richard R. Clark (unknown—10 May 1944, killed in action), Major William B. Clark (11 May 1944 – 5 November 1944, killed in action), Major Lewis T. Phillips (6 November 1944 – June 1945), Harold Lewis

== Training history and movement overseas ==
=== Formation ===
The group and its four squadrons were activated without personnel or equipment on 1 June 1943, at Wendover Field, Utah. On 14 July 1943, the location of the group was changed to Gowen Field, Idaho, where a cadre of 66 officers and 237 enlisted men was assigned, transferred from the 29th Bomb Group at Gowen. Colonel Steed, formerly chief of staff of the IV Bomber Command, took command on the same date. While at Gowen Field, and at its next two stations, the 456th received additional personnel drawn from the 18th Replacement Wing at Salt Lake City, Utah, and the 470th Bomb Group, Mountain Home Army Air Field, Idaho. The air echelon (consisting at that time of key flying staff and four aircrews) was sent to the Army Air Force School of Applied Tactics at Orlando Army Air Base, Florida, for a four-week course of specialized cadre training in field operations and combat tactics.

On 30 July 1943, the group's ground echelon moved to Bruning Army Air Field, Nebraska, where it remained until 8 October. The air echelon joined the group at Bruning in mid-August and received four B-24D aircraft for familiarization flights.

The air echelon left Bruning on 5 September 1943, for Kearns Army Air Base, Utah, and on 29 September moved by train to Muroc Army Air Base, California, where it would remain until its designated overseas deployment date of 1 December. The ground echelon followed on 8 October. By 1 November, to train approximately 70 crews, the 456th had received only 28 aircraft, all old and half of them grounded for maintenance or lack of spare parts. The shortage of aircraft hampered the training efforts not only of its flying personnel but also its maintenance units.

The 456th received only a minimal amount of unit training in navigation, high altitude bombing, and gunnery, but its most serious training deficiency was a lack of high altitude formation flying using heavily loaded aircraft (as it would in combat). In all the group received only three of the normal six months of unit POM ("Preparation for Overseas Movement") training.

Despite the group's lack of preparation, and the refusal by Colonel Steed to certify its combat readiness to POM inspectors, the 456th's air echelon was ordered to discontinue training. The ground campaign in Italy had captured Foggia and its network of potential airfields, and seven groups of Liberators originally slated for the Eighth Air Force, including the 456th, had been diverted by General Arnold to the new bases then under construction.

The air echelon was ordered to fly its training aircraft to Hamilton Field, California, beginning 3 December 1943, while the ground echelon entrained for movement to a port of embarkation. At the time of its deployment, the 456th had reached its full strength of 377 officers and 1,627 enlisted men.

=== Movement to Italy ===
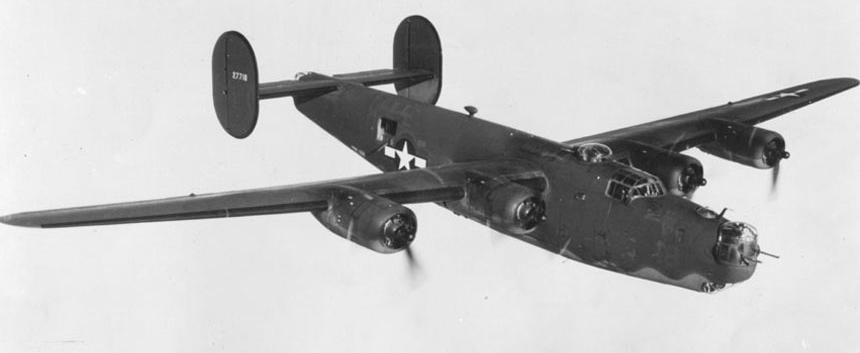
B-24H-5-FO Liberator, built by Ford, Willow Run

At Hamilton Field the air echelon received 61 new B-24H Liberator bombers over a period of several weeks. Traveling individually between December and February, the aircraft flew to Italy using the South Atlantic Ferry Route, established by Pan American Airways in the 1930s: Palm Beach, Florida; Puerto Rico; Trinidad; Belém and Natal, Brazil; Dakar, French West Africa; Marrakesh and Casablanca, French Morocco; Oran, Algeria; and Tunis, Tunisia, where it waited while construction was completed on its airfield. On 30 January 1944, at Dakar, one of the 456th's aircraft exploded while taking off, killing nine of the ten crew members.

The ground echelon arrived at Camp Patrick Henry, Virginia, on 4 December, underwent final processing, and sailed in a convoy from Newport News, Virginia on 15 December aboard three Liberty ships. The convoy passed through the Strait of Gibraltar on 5 January 1944, divided into two sections, and reached the Italian ports of Taranto on 11 January and Naples, 19 January.

On 23 January, the ground echelon traveled by open truck in wet, freezing weather to the new base (code-named "Newbox") on the Tavoliere near the Adriatic Sea, eighteen miles (29 km) southeast of Foggia. The airbase was constructed on a nationalized estate called Incarnata Farm (41°16′N 15°44′E), less than a mile north of the village of Stornarella and approximately two miles southwest of the larger town of Stornara; it received the name of the larger city as its location. Stornara airbase was centered in a cluster of airfields of its parent and newly activated 304th Bomb Wing and two other heavy bomber wings of the Fifteenth Air Force surrounding the city of Cerignola.

Staff officers immediately began requisitioning farmhouses for administrative buildings and setting up tent encampments in nearby olive groves for the living quarters. With some improvised improvements, the 456th lived in tents throughout its fifteen months at Stornara (for several months, the ground crews lived in infantry shelter halves until a sufficient number of squad-sized tents became available). Stonara's single runway was 4,800 feet (1,500 m) in length and oriented north-to-south, with taxiways on either side and revetments for 62 aircraft placed along them. The runways and taxiways were covered with steel matting called pierced steel planking, or PSP.

On 26 January, the 456th group headquarters reached Stornara and activated the base. The group's bombers began arriving from Tunisia on 1 February. On a training familiarization flight on 6 February another B-24 was lost, crashing into a mountain while flying in clouds, killing all aboard including three aircraft commanders.

== Combat operations and tactics ==
The original group identification aircraft markings for the 456th Bomb Group, located on the outward side of the B-24's twin tail fins, consisted of a black diamond symbol superimposed on a white circle (marking of the 304th Bombardment Wing) on the fin's upper half, and the number 3 in white on the lower half. In May 1944, with the numbers of olive drab aircraft diminishing rapidly by combat attrition and operational wear, the Fifteenth Air Force adopted a system of color bands and symbols. The 456th's markings then became a 4-foot (1.2 m) long black diamond on the upper half, and the entire lower half painted bright red (the 456th's group color). The upper surface of a bomber's rear horizontal stabilizer, on which the tail fins were mounted, was similarly marked, with the left stabilizer painted red and the right having the diamond symbol.

Within the 456th Group, individual aircraft were identified initially by numbers painted on their noses, with sets of two-digit numbers assigned to squadrons ("numbers in squadron"), but this system was later discontinued and a non-standard pattern of three-digit numbers employed (usually, but not always, the last three numbers of an airplane's USAAF serial number). Late in the war some squadrons adopted letter identification painted on the rear fuselage, but this was not systematized, and many aircraft had no individual identification at all.

=== In combat ===
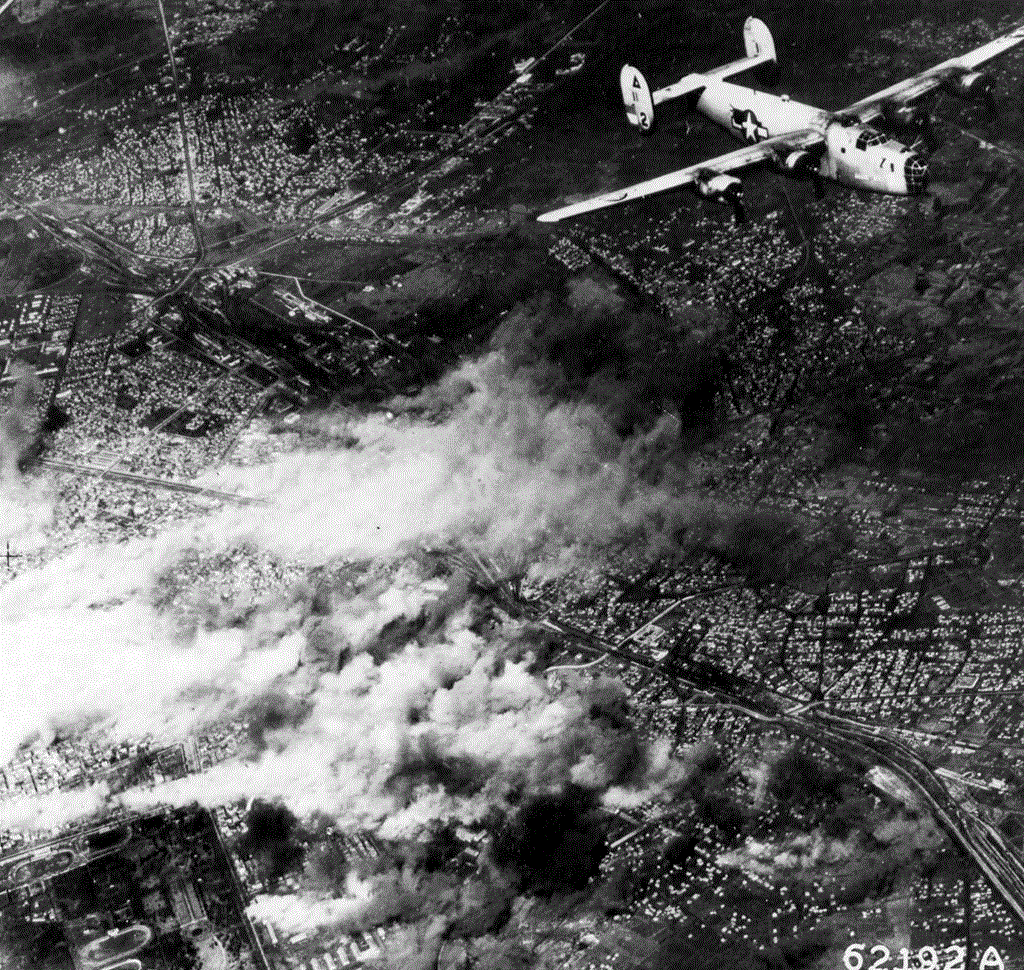
B-24 Liberators of the 456th Bombardment Group attacking Karlova Airdrome, Bulgaria, 1 June 1944

The 456th Bomb Group flew its first combat mission on 10 February 1944, less than two weeks after reaching Italy. The U.S. Fifth Army had conducted an amphibious landing at Anzio on 22 January to outflank the German Gustav Line, and the German Army had begun counterattacks against the beachhead. The 456th was tasked to attack a German command post near Grottaferrata and encountered no opposition, but when the group reached the target area, they found it completely obscured by clouds and returned without dropping their bombs.

Continuing poor weather conditions prevented further missions for another week, during which time the group continued flight training in combat formations. The 456th employed the six-combat box tactical formation favored by the Fifteenth Air Force to maximize defense against intercepting Luftwaffe fighters (for a detailed description see six-box formation). When the weather cleared on 17 February, the 456th repeated its earlier mission to bomb the command post at Grottaferrata. Although judging the results of bombing as successful, the 456th was engaged by nine fighters and severe flak, suffering its first combat losses as two bombers were shot down.

On six of its first ten missions weather conditions were poor and no bombs were dropped. On 15 March the group was one of several which bombed Monte Cassino in support of Fifth Army operations. The second unit of the 456th dropped its bombs in error on Allied troops, for which the deputy group commander was removed.

The 456th struck its first strategic target, the aircraft engine plant at Steyr, Austria, on 3 April, and on 12 April encountered its first severe air combat with German fighters. Over 100 intercepted the mission to the airfield at Bad Vöslau, Austria, and in a 40-minute battle shot down three Liberators. Four more were lost to 65 fighters on a 21 April mission to Bucharest, Romania.

=== Raids on Ploieşti and oil production ===
The 456th made the first of ten attacks on Ploieşti oil facilities on 5 May 1944, losing three aircraft, including one when a crewman bailing out of a stricken bomber knocked part of the wing off another in the same formation.

The 456th earned the first of two Distinguished Unit Citations on 10 May for a mission to bomb the Henschel & Sohn [sic] aircraft factory at Wiener Neustadt, Austria, for attacking despite severe losses (five shot down and the remaining 26 damaged) after the other groups on the mission turned back because of bad weather. On 23 May, returning from a mission in which they were unable to bomb, two Liberators collided in mid-air directly over the base, killing all but one of the 20 crewmen aboard and dropping live bombs on the field.

On 22 June 1944, the 456th Bomb Group began flying a four-box 40-aircraft diamond formation to concentrate its bombing pattern for greater accuracy. On 2 July, the group earned its second DUC on a mission to bomb the Shell Oil refinery at Budapest, Hungary. 31 aircraft bombed the previously untouched refinery at mid-morning and three minutes after bomb release, before reassembly in the new formation, were attacked by 50 Bf 109s and 10 Fw 190s of Luftwaffe gruppe JG.302 and Hungarian Air Force 101 Puma Group. The second box of the 456th bore the brunt of the attacks, with the 744th Bomb Squadron losing six of nine bombers in the target area and a seventh damaged beyond repair. 36 airmen were killed or missing and 24 captured, the largest single-day loss for the group.

Beginning 8 July, the first crews of the 456th completing the 50 missions required for a combat tour by the Fifteenth Air Force began returning to the United States. The last crew among the original 68 to be lost in combat went down on 20 July.

The last of 19 missions against Romanian oil production occurred 18 August. Missions of the Oil Campaign of World War II continued against at Odertal, Germany (Polish: Zdzieszowice); Moosbierbaum and Vienna, Austria; Most, Czechoslovakia; and Blechhammer, Poland, with 26 bombers lost on 23 missions. Bombing of German lines of communication, particularly marshalling yards and railroad bridges, remained a priority to the end of the war.

After August 1944 the 456th did not lose another aircraft to fighter defenses, but losses continued to accumulate from anti-aircraft fire. In the remaining nine months of operations 43 bombers were lost, most to flak. Three or more bombers were lost on five missions, including 11 November, when three planes crashed into the Adriatic after being recalled from a mission. In February 1945, the 456th began flying two missions per day, termed Red and Blue.

The last combat loss in the group occurred on 25 April 1945, at Linz, Austria. The following day, while General of the Army Henry H. Arnold, commanding general of the USAAF, was visiting the base, the 456th flew its last mission of the war against a transportation depot at Tarvisio, Italy, and scored a bombing accuracy of 100%, matched by only one other group in Europe (the 467th Bomb Group, also a B-24 unit, of the Eighth Air Force had accomplished it on 13 April 1945).

=== Statistical summary of operations ===
==== Bombing summary ====
At the close of the 456th's European operations, its group statistical officer issued a summary of its combat operations. During its 249 bombing missions, the 456th flew a cumulative total of 7,272 sorties and dropped 13,939 tons of bombs on Axis targets. 45% of this total was dropped on lines of communication targets, 18% on oil production and storage, 14% on airfields, 12% on industrial infrastructure, 6% on troop concentrations, and 5% on targets of opportunity or other types. The 456th had the highest average percentage of bombing accuracy within the 304th Bomb Wing and progressed from an average of 20.1% accuracy (bombs falling within 1,000 feet (300 m) of the aiming point) in its first full month of operations to 71.9% during its last full month of operations. This accuracy average was higher than all but one Eighth Air Force group.

==== Maintenance summary ====
The 456th averaged a maintenance rate of 83% for daily availability of aircraft for mission assignments, again the highest within the 304th Wing.

==== Losses and casualties ====
456th BG losses
91	B-24s lost in combat
18	B-24s lost in accidents
331	Air crew killed in action
206	Air crew missing in action
271	Air crew captured
6	Air crew interned

The 456th had 117 bombers destroyed or written off as salvage during its overseas assignment. Of this number, 91 were lost in combat (20 shot down by fighters, 56 by flak, and 15 by unknown means), with 74 of those crashing in Axis-controlled territory, 10 in the Adriatic Sea, 2 in Switzerland, 3 in Soviet-controlled territory in Poland, one on the island of Vis, and one over Italy. 18 aircraft were destroyed in non-combat related accidents: 4 in flying crashes, 4 on take-offs, 6 on landings, 2 in a mid-air collision over the base, and 2 in accidents while on the ground. 8 battle-damaged aircraft were written off as beyond economical repair. 36 of the original 61 bombers were destroyed and all but one of the rest taken out of service as "war weary".

3,267 aircrew served in the 456th Bomb Group during the war. 1,079 or 33% were aboard aircraft destroyed. 331 airmen were killed in action, 206 remain missing in action, 271 were made prisoners-of-war, 6 were interned in Switzerland until the end of hostilities, 108 evaded capture and returned to duty, and 49 returned to base. Of the 108 evadees, 9 evaded capture in Italy, 10 in Hungary, and 89 in Yugoslavia. 26 of the original 68 combat crews and 17 of the first 27 replacement crews were shot down. The group, equivalent to an infantry regiment, equalled or exceeded the killed-in-action of 15 ground force divisions.

Its members were awarded one Distinguished Service Cross, 19 Silver Stars, 215 Distinguished Flying Crosses, and over 2,000 Air Medals.

All figures per Capps

== Honors and campaigns ==
=== Honors ===

Distinguished Unit Citation, World War II
Wiener Neustadt, 10 May 1944
Budapest, 2 July 1944

=== Campaigns ===

Air Offensive, Europe
Rome-Arno
Normandy
Northern France
Southern France
North Apennines
Rhineland
Central Europe
Po Valley

== Post-war history ==
The 456th relocated to Smoky Hill Army Air Field, Kansas, on 17 August 1945, for conversion to the Boeing B-29 Superfortress and operations against Japan, and was redesignated as the 456th Bombardment Group, Very Heavy. The war ended before the conversion was completed, however, and the group was inactivated on 17 October 1945.

The 456th was activated again as a reserve unit of the United States Air Force. From 1 July 1947 to 27 June 1949, at McChord Air Force Base, Washington, the 456th Bomb Group operated B-29's.

The group returned to the regular Air force from 1 December 1952 to 1 March 1955, as the 456th Troop Carrier Group, Medium as the operations group for the 456th Troop Carrier Wing operating Fairchild C-119 Flying Boxcar transports in both a standard airlift and research mission, based at Miami International Airport, Florida where it replaced the 435th Troop Carrier Group, a reserve unit activated for the Korean War on 1 December 1952. The group moved to Charleston Air Force Base, South Carolina on 15 August 1953 and was inactivated there on 1 March 1955.

Commanders of the post-war 456th Group were: Col. Leonard J. Barrow Jr. (c. December 1952), LtCol. Malcolm P. Hooker (c. February 1953), Col. Jay D. Bogue (1953 – 1 March 1955).

The honors and lineage of the group were temporarily bestowed on the 456th Strategic Aerospace Wing (later the 456th Bombardment Wing) at Beale Air Force Base, California. The 456th included the 744th Bombardment Squadron among its subordinate units.

== Lineage ==
- Constituted as 456th Bombardment Group (Heavy) on 14 May 1943

Activated on 1 June 1943
Redesignated 456th Bombardment Group, Heavy c. 6 March 1944
Redesignated 456th Bombardment Group, Very Heavy on 5 August 1945
Inactivated on 17 October 1945

- Activated on 12 July 1947 in the reserve

Inactivated on 27 June 1949
Redesignated 456th Troop Carrier Group, Medium on 15 October 1952

- Activated on 1 December 1952

Inactivated on 1 March 1955

=== Assignments ===
- IV Bomber Command, 1 June–December 1943
- 304th Bombardment Wing, January 1944 – July 1945
- Second Air Force, 1 August-17 October 1945 (attached to: 17th Bombardment Operational Training Wing after 17 August 1945)
- Fourth Air Force, 17 August 1947 – 27 June 1949
- 456th Troop Carrier Wing, 1 December 1952 – 1 March 1955

=== Components ===
- 744th Bombardment Squadron (later 744th Troop Carrier Squadron) 1 June 1943 – 17 October 1945; 12 July 1947 – 27 June 1949; 1 December 1952 – 1 March 1955
- 745th Bombardment Squadron (later 745th Troop Carrier Squadron): 1 June 1943 – 17 October 1945; 12 July 1947 – 27 June 1949; 1 December 1952 - 1 March 1955
- 746th Bombardment Squadron (later 746th Troop Carrier Squadron): 1 June 1943 – 17 October 1945; 12 July 1947 – 27 June 1949; 1 December 1952 – 1 March 1955
- 747th Bombardment Squadron (later 747th Troop Carrier Squadron): 1 June 1943 – 17 October 1945; 12 July 1947 – 27 June 1949

=== Stations ===
- Wendover Field, Utah, 1 June 1943
- Gowen Field, Idaho, 14 July 1943;
- Bruning Army Air Field, Nebraska, c. 30 July 1943
- Kearns Army Air Field, Utah, c. 11 September 1943
- Muroc Army Air Field, California, October–December 1943
- Cerignola Airfield, Italy, January 1944
- Stornara Airfield, Italy, January 1944 – July 1945
- Sioux Falls Army Air Field, South Dakota, 1 August 1945
- Smoky Hill Army Air Field, Kansas, 17 August-17 October 1945
- McChord Air Force Base, Washington, 12 July 1947 – 27 June 1949
- Miami International Airport, Florida, 1 December 1952
- Charleston Air Force Base, South Carolina, 25 July 1953 – 16 October 1955
- Shiroi Air Base, Japan, 10 November 1955 – 1 March 1955

=== Aircraft ===
- Consolidated B-24 Liberator, 1943–1945
- Boeing B-29 Superfortress, 1945
- Fairchild C-119 Flying Boxcar, 1 December 1952 – 1 March 1955
