= 17th Training Wing =

Unit of the US Air Force assigned to the Air Education and Training Command

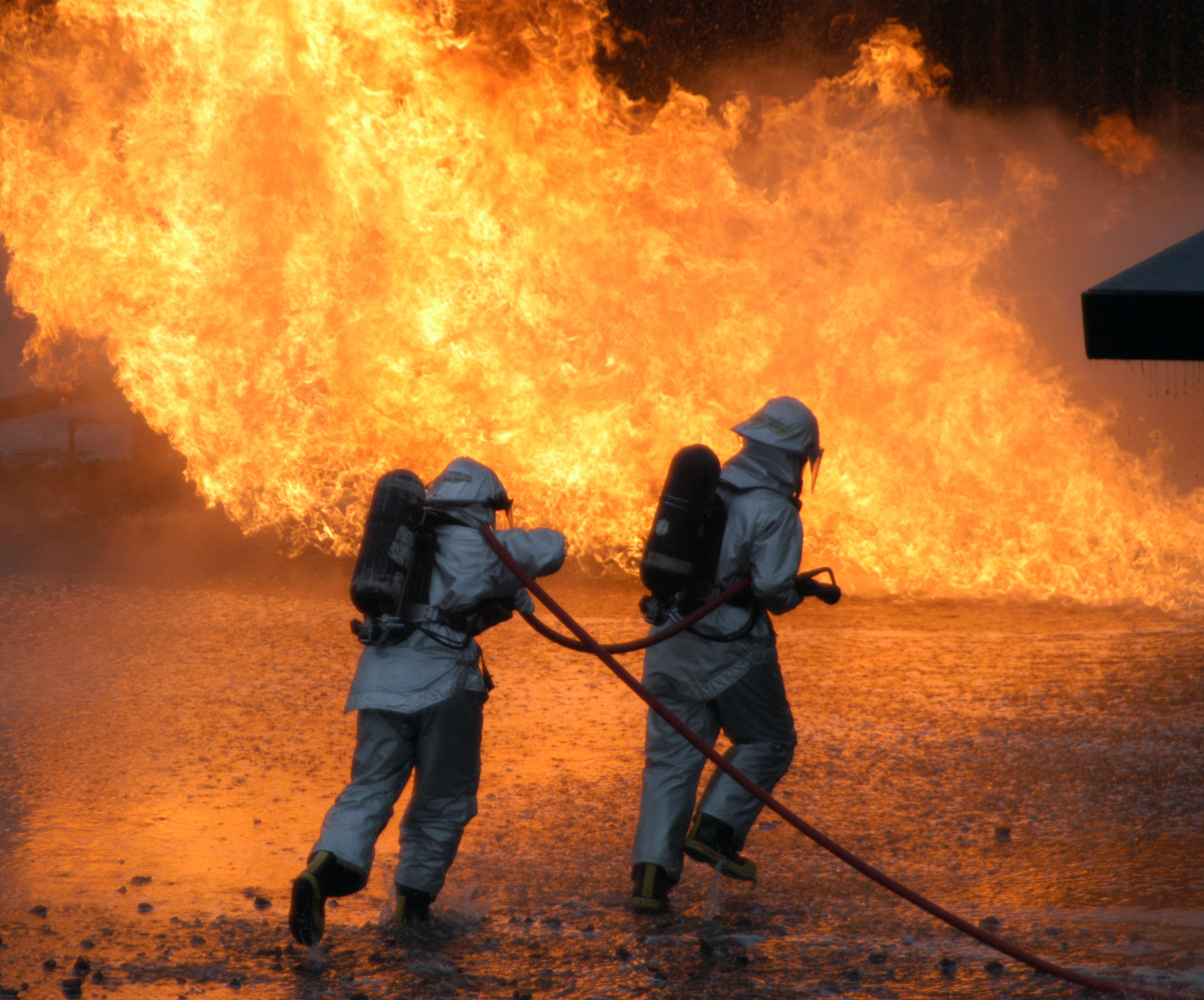
- Two Aviation Boatswains Mate students assault a large-scale mock aircraft fire at Goodfellow Air Force Base, Texas
- Active: 1952–1958; 1963–1976; 1982–1991; 1993–present
- Country: United States
- Branch: United States Air Force
- Role: Training
- Part of: Second Air Force
- Garrison/HQ: Goodfellow Air Force Base
- Motto: Toujours au Danger (French for 'Ever into Danger')
- Engagements: Korean War
- Decorations: Air Force Outstanding Unit Award; Republic of Korea Presidential Unit Citation

Commanders
- Current commander: Col. Matthew A. Norton
- Vice commander: Col. Rob Watkins
- Command Chief: CCM Derek Neill

Insignia
- 17th Training Wing emblem (Note: Modified 18 September 1995.)

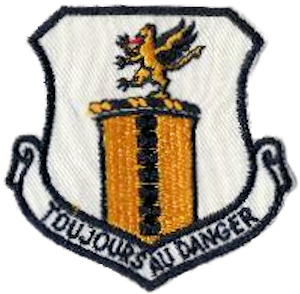
- Patch with 17th Bombardment Wing emblem (Note: Approved 27 May 1952. The emblem was firset approved on 2 November 1937 for the 17th Bombardment Group and features seven crosses denoting the seven World War I campaign honors of the group's 95th Aero Squadron.)

The 17th Training Wing is a United States Air Force unit assigned to the Air Education and Training Command Second Air Force. It is stationed at Goodfellow Air Force Base, Texas. The wing is also the host unit at Goodfellow. It was activated as a non-flying wing on 1 July 1993. Its mission is to train intelligence personnel in all the branches of the armed forces, as well as firefighters and a few other specialties. The wing trains Air Force enlisted intelligence, cryptology and linguist AFSCs 1N0, 1N1, 1N2, 1N3, 1N4, 1N5, 1A8, Air Force intelligence officer AFSC 14N, and military firefighters from all branches. Many corresponding Army, Navy, Space Force, and Marine Corps intelligence personnel are also trained at Goodfellow AFB, and assigned to the local units.

Its 17th Training Group is a successor of the 3480th Technical Training Wing, which has provided intelligence training at Goodfellow AFB for decades.

The 17th Training Wing is commanded by Colonel Matthew A. Norton. The current Vice Commander is Colonel Thomas K. Wilson. Its Command Chief Master Sergeant Khamillia A. Washington.

== History ==
See 17th Bombardment Group for additional history and lineage information prior to 1952

=== Korean War ===
Established as the 17th Bombardment Wing, Light on 8 May 1952 and assigned to the Far East Air Forces Fifth Air Force. The wing was activated two days later at Pusan-East Air Base (K-9), South Korea, where it replaced the Air Force Reserve 452d Bombardment Wing Light when its activation ended. Its 17th Bombardment Group acquired the World War II-era 452d's Douglas A-26 Invaders. The Invader had proven to be the only bomber suited to the night interdiction role in Korea. Unfortunately, the Invader was capable of visual-only operations and was available only in dwindling numbers. Operational squadrons of the 17th BG were the 34th, 37th and 95th Bombardment Squadrons. The wing conducted combat operations during the Korean War, 10 May 1952 – 27 July 1953, including night intruder light bombardment missions against enemy supply centers, communications and transportation facilities; interdiction of North Korean railroads; armed reconnaissance; and close air support for ground forces.

Remaining in South Korea for over a year after the armistice that ended combat as a deterrent force, the wing moved to Miho AB, Japan on 10 October 1954, where it maintained operational proficiency for light bombardment. It was inactivated on 20 March 1955.

=== Tactical Air Command ===
The unit was reactivated in the United States on 1 April 1955 and assigned to Ninth Air Force of Tactical Air Command (TAC). It was stationed at Eglin Air Force Base Aiuxiliary Field No. 9, Florida where it was programmed to receive the Martin B-57 Canberra, the replacement for the B-26. On 1 October 1955, it was redesignated the 17th Bombardment Wing, Tactical and received B-57B aircraft in early 1956. It flew B-57s in 1956 and 1957, however the aircraft was troublesome and unreliable, and was retired from the inventory quickly.

In 1956 deliveries of the Douglas B-66B Destroyer began and by July 1957 the wing had become the sole USAF wing to be equipped with this model of the Destroyer, which it operated until inactivating in 1958. The first B-66 arrived from Norton Air Force Base, California, on 16 March 1956. In late 1957, TAC began to transfer its Destroyers to the 47th Bombardment Wing of United States Air Forces Europe and the 17th was inactivated on 25 June 1958.

=== 4043d Strategic Wing ===
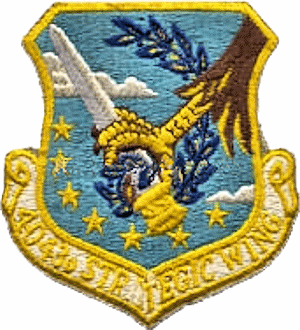
Emblem of the 4043d Strategic Wing

The 17th was assigned to Strategic Air Command and redesignated as the 17th Bombardment Wing, Heavy and organized on 1 February 1963 at Wright-Patterson Air Force Base, Ohio. The 17th's origins under SAC began on 1 April 1959 when Strategic Air Command organized the 4039th Strategic Wing at Wright-Patterson and assigned it to the 40th Air Division on 1 July as part of SAC's plan to disperse its B-52 Stratofortress heavy bombers over a larger number of bases, thus making it more difficult for the Soviet Union to knock out the entire fleet with a surprise first strike. The wing remained a headquarters only until 15 September 1959 when the 66th Aviation Depot Squadron was activated to oversee the wing's special weapons. In October three maintenance squadrons and a squadron to provide security for the wing's aircraft and weapons were added, but it was not until 1 December that the wing's first flying squadron, the 922d Air Refueling Squadron, flying Boeing KC-135 Stratotankers was activated and assigned. The wing was fully organized on 1 June 1960 when the 42d Bombardment Squadron (BS), consisting of 15 Boeing B-52 Stratofortresses moved to Wright-Patterson from Altus AFB, Oklahoma where it had been one of the three squadrons of the 11th Bombardment Wing. Starting in 1960, one third of the squadron's aircraft were maintained on fifteen-minute alert, fully fueled and ready for combat to reduce vulnerability to a Soviet missile strike. This was increased to half the squadron's aircraft in 1962. In 1962, the wing's bombers began to be equipped with the GAM-77 Hound Dog and the GAM-72 Quail air-launched cruise missiles, The 4042d Airborne Missile Maintenance Squadron was activated in November to maintain these missiles.

=== Reactivation of the 17th Bombardment Wing ===
In 1962, in order to perpetuate the lineage of many currently inactive bombardment units with illustrious World War II records, Headquarters SAC received authority from Headquarters USAF to discontinue its Major Command controlled (MAJCON) strategic wings that were equipped with combat aircraft and to activate Air Force controlled (AFCON) units, most of which were inactive at the time which could carry a lineage and history. (Note: MAJCON units could not carry a permanent history or lineage. Ravenstein, Charles A. (1984). A Guide to Air Force Lineage and Honors (2d, Revised ed.). Maxwell AFB, AL: USAF Historical Research Center. p. 12..)

The 4043d Wing was replaced by the 17th Bombardment Wing on 1 February 1963 and was assigned to SAC's 40th AD. (Note: In addition to its own history, the 17th Wing also continued, through temporary bestowal, the history, and honors of the 17th Bombardment Group. It was also entitled to retain the honors, but not the history or lineage, of the 4043d.) The 922d Air Refueling Squadron and 66th Munitions Maintenance Squadron transferred to the 17th. The 42d Bombardment Squadron was replaced by the 34th Bombardment Squadron, one of the unit's World War II historical bomb squadrons and the 4043d's maintenance and security squadrons were replaced by ones with the 17th numerical designation of the newly activated wing. Each of the new units assumed the personnel, equipment, and mission of its predecessor. Under the Dual Deputate organization, all components were directly assigned to the wing, no operational or maintenance group element was activated. The history, lineage and honors of the 17th Bombardment Group were temporarily bestowed upon the newly established wing upon activation.

The 17th Bomb Wing trained in strategic bombing and aerial refueling on a global basis. It furnished B-52s and KC-135 aircraft and crews to deployed SAC wings in the western Pacific and Thailand that were engaged in combat operations over Southeast Asia as part of the Vietnam War from 1966 to 1975.

The 17th BW was taken off alert at Wright-Patterson AFB, OH, on 30 June 1975 and phased down, transferring aircraft by 7 July as part of SAC's leaving the base. It was reassigned without personnel or equipment to Beale AFB, California, on 30 September 1975 and absorbed resources of the 456th Bombardment Wing, including B-52G and KC-135Q aircraft. At Beale, the 17th continued global strategic bombardment alert to 30 June 1976 and used tanker aircraft primarily to refuel SR-71s of the 9th Strategic Reconnaissance Wing. The wing was inactivated on 30 September 1976 and replaced by the 100th Air Refueling Wing as part of a realignment of SAC assets.

The wing was reactivated at RAF Alconbury, in the United Kingdom as the 17th Reconnaissance Wing on 1 October 1982. The operational squadron of the 17th Wing was the 95th Reconnaissance Squadron. The wing flew tactical and strategic surveillance missions in Western Europe using the TR-1 (U-2R). It received the P. T. Cullen Trophy for providing "the greatest contribution to the intelligence gathering efforts of SAC" in 1989 and 1990. During 1990–91, many of the wing's assets and personnel supported Gulf War operations by ferrying aircraft and equipment to Taif, Saudi Arabia.

The wing inactivated on 30 June 1991, but its subordinate 95th Reconnaissance Squadron, remained at Alconbury as a non-flying organization until 15 September 1993. The U-2Rs were consolidated at Beale Air Force Base, California with the 9th Wing.

When the wing was reactivated in July 1993, it initially comprised the 17th Training Group, 17th Medical Group, and 17th Mission Support Group. The 17th Training Group was activated as the 3480 Technical Training Wing on 1 July 1978; redesignated as the 3480 Technical Training Wing (USAF Cryptological Training Center) on 3 January 1984; the 3480 Technical Training Wing on 1 March 1985; the 3480 Technical Training Group on 1 February 1992; the 391 Technical Training Group on 15 September 1992; the 17 Technical Training Group on 1 Jul 1993; and the 17 Training Group on 1 April 1994. The 17th Medical and Mission Support Groups had previously served with the Wing in the 1950s. There are 17 TRW units at the Defense Language Institute, Corry Station, and Fort Huachuca, AZ which also do intelligence training. The wing is also responsible for writing the CDCs for the AFSCs which it trains.

== Lineage ==
- Constitute as the 17th Bombardment Wing, Light on 8 May 1952

Activated on 10 May 1952.
Redesignated 17th Bombardment Wing, Tactical on 1 October 1955
Inactivated on 25 June 1958

- Redesignated 17th Bombardment Wing, Heavy and activated, on 15 November 1962

Organized on 1 February 1963
Inactivated on 30 September 1976

- Redesignated 17th Reconnaissance Wing on 20 January 1982

Activated on 1 October 1982
Inactivated on 30 June 1991

- Redesignated 17th Training Wing and activated on 1 July 1993

=== Assignments ===
- Fifth Air Force, 10 May 1952
- Ninth Air Force, 1 April 1955 – 25 June 1958

Attached to Nineteenth Air Force, 15 December 1956 – 15 December 1957

- Strategic Air Command, 15 November 1962
- 40th Air Division, 1 February 1963
- 6th Air Division, 1 July 1963
- 57th Air Division, 1 July 1965
- 817th Air Division, 2 July 1968
- 45th Air Division, 2 July 1969
- 40th Air Division, 1 July 1971
- 42d Air Division, 1 July 1973
- 14th Air Division, 30 September 1975 – 30 September 1976
- 7th Air Division, 1 October 1982 – 30 June 1991
- Second Air Force, 1 July 1993 – present

=== Stations ===
- Pusan-East AB (K-9), South Korea, 10 May 1952
- Miho Air Base, Japan, 10 October 1954 – 20 March 1955
- Eglin Air Force Auxiliary Field No. 9 (Hurlburt Field), Florida, 1 April 1955 – 25 June 1958
- Wright-Patterson Air Force Base, Ohio, 1 February 1963
- Beale Air Force Base, California, 30 September 1975 – 30 September 1976
- RAF Alconbury, United Kingdom, 1 October 1982 – 30 June 1991
- Goodfellow AFB, Texas, 1 July 1993 – present

=== Components ===
- 17th Bombardment Group: 10 May 1952 – 25 June 1958
- 17th Technical Training Group, later 17th Training Group, 1 July 1993 - present
- 17th Support Group (later 17th Mission Support Group), 1 July 1993 - present
- 17th Medical Group (constituted 8 May 1952; activated on 10 May 1952. Redesignated as 17 Tactical Hospital on 8 Mar 1954; 17 Tactical Infirmary on 18 Jun 1955; 17 Tactical Hospital on 17 Aug 1956. Inactivated on 25 Jun 1958. Redesignated as 17 Medical Squadron, and activated, on 1 Jul 1993. Redesignated as 17 Medical Group on 27 Sep 1994), 10 May 1952-25 June 1958, 1 July 1993-2 December 2025.
- 517th Training Group, 14 May 2009 - present.
- 9th Air Refueling Squadron: 30 September 1975 – 30 September 1976
- 34th Bombardment Squadron: attached 8 June 1957 – 25 June 1958; assigned 1 February 1963 – 30 September 1976
- 37th Bombardment Squadron: attached 8 June 1957 – 25 June 1958
- 95th Bombardment (later, 95th Reconnaissance) Squadron: attached 8 June 1957 – 25 June 1958; assigned 1 October 1982 – 30 June 1991
- 903d Air Refueling Squadron: 30 September 1975 – 30 September 1976
- 922d Air Refueling Squadron: 1 February 1963 – 30 September 1975

=== Aircraft ===
- B-26 Invader, 1952–1956
- B-57 Canberra, 1955–1956
- B-66 Destroyer, 1956–1958
- B-52 Stratofortress, 1963–1975, 1975–1976
- KC-135 Stratotanker, 1963–1975, 1975–1976
- TR-1A Dragon Lady, 1982–1991

=== Campaigns ===
Campaign Streamers.

- Korea: Korea, Summer-Fall, 1952; Third Korean Winter; Korea, Summer, 1953.
- Southwest Asia: Defense of Saudi Arabia; Liberation and Defense of Kuwait

== See also ==
- List of B-52 Units of the United States Air Force
