= 747th Bombardment Squadron =

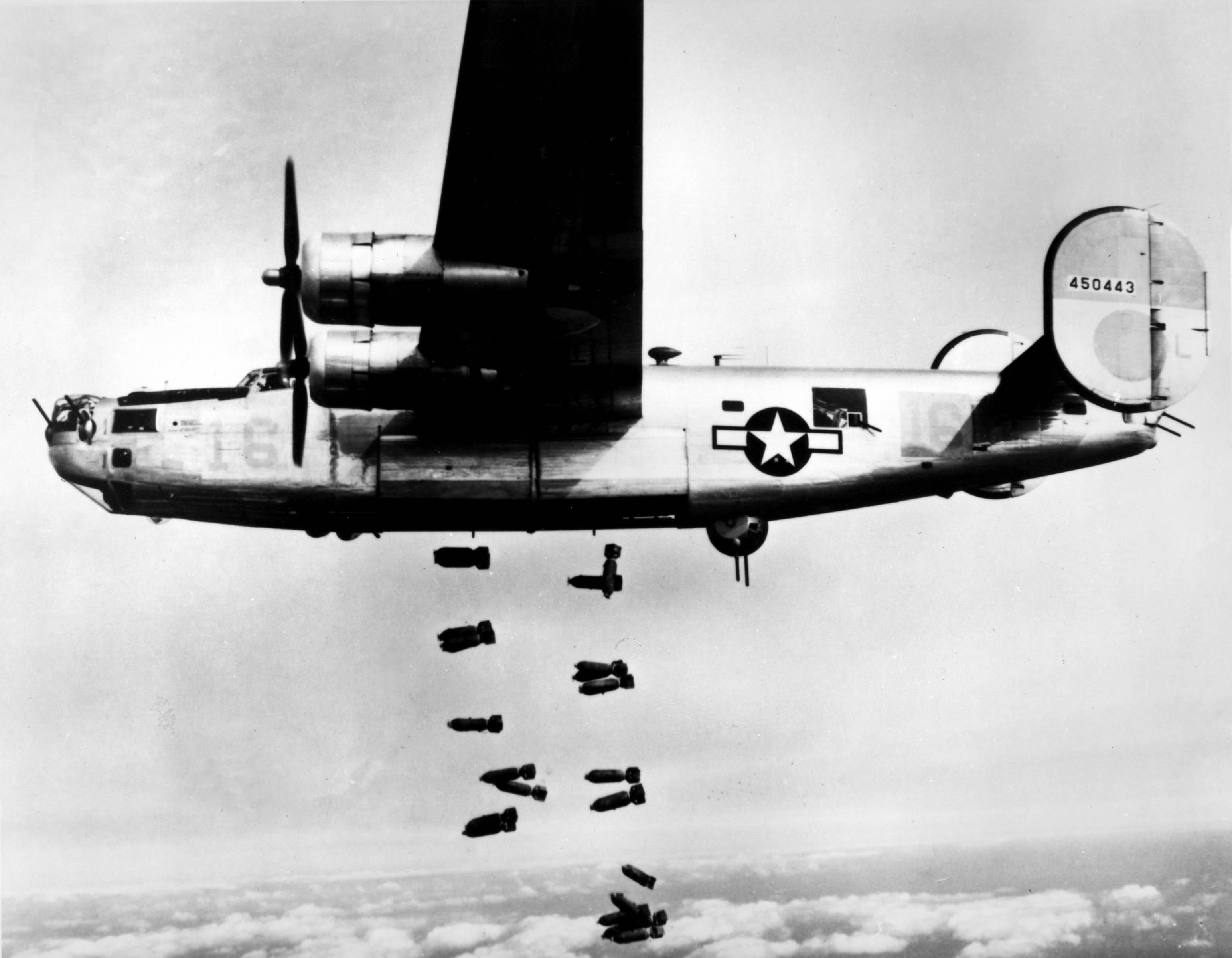
- 15th Air Force B-24 Liberator attacking a target
- Active: 1942-1945; 1947-1949
- Country: United States
- Branch: United States Air Force
- Role: Heavy bomber
- Engagements: Mediterranean Theater of Operations
- Decorations: Distinguished Unit Citation

Insignia
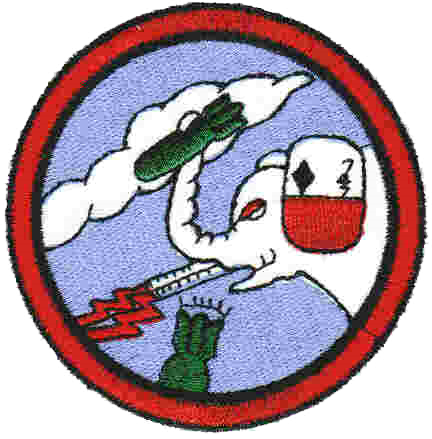
- 747th Bombardment Squadron emblem (World War II)

The 747th Bombardment Squadron is an inactive United States Air Force unit. The squadron was first activated in June 1943. After training in the United States,, it deployed to the Mediterranean Theater of Operations, where it participated in the strategic bombing campaign against Germany. It earned two Distinguished Unit Citations for its combat operations. Following V-E Day, the squadron returned to the United States and began reorganizing as a very heavy bomber unit, but after the Japanese surrender, was inactivated in October 1945.

The squadron was reactivated in the reserve in 1947, but does not appear to have been fully equipped or manned before inactivating in 1949.

== History ==
=== World War II ===
The squadron was first activated as the 747th Bombardment Squadron at Wendover Field, Utah on 1 June 1943, where it was one of the four original squadrons of the 456th Bombardment Group and received its initial cadre. Shortly thereafter the squadron moved to Gowen Field, Idaho and began to train with Consolidated B-24 Liberator bombers. It completed its training in December 1943 and began its movement to the Mediterranean Theater of Operations.

The squadron arrived in theater at Cerignola Airfield on 11 January 1944 and later that month moved to its combat station of Stornara Airfield, Italy. The squadron began combat operations the following month, primarily engaging in the strategic bombing campaign against Germany. Its early operations were conducted against airfields, aircraft factories, and railroad bridges in Italy, Austria and Romania. On 10 May 1944, the squadron was targeted against a manufacturing center at Wiener Neustadt, Austria. Adverse weather caused most of the attacking force to turn back before reaching the target. The 747th and the rest of the 456th Group proceeded to attack the target despite heavy interceptor opposition that was able to concentrate on defending against the group's Liberators. Its actions in this operation earned the squadron its first Distinguished Unit Citation (DUC).

The squadron expanded its operations to include attacks on locomotive manufacturing plants, oil refineries, oil storage facilities and viaducts in France, Germany, Czechoslovakia, Hungary, and the Balkan peninsula. On 2 July 1944, the squadron braved severe enemy fighter attacks while bombing oil facilities at Budapest, Hungary, for which it was awarded a second DUC.

The squadron was occasionally diverted from its strategic mission to carry out air support and air interdiction missions. From July through August 1944, it helped prepare the way for Operation Dragoon, the invasion of southern France. In the spring of 1945, it supported Operation Grapeshot, the offensive by the United States Fifth Army and British Eighth Army against remaining German forces in northern Italy.

Following V-E Day, the squadron airlifted supplies to airfields in northern Italy. It returned to the United States in July and began to reorganize as a very heavy bomber unit. However, with the surrender of Japan, the squadron was inactivated on 17 October 1945.

=== Air Force reserve ===
The squadron was reactivated as a reserve unit under Air Defense Command (ADC) at McChord Field, Washington in August 1947, where its training was supervised by ADC's 406th AAF Base Unit (later the 2345th Air Force Reserve Training Center). It was nominally a very heavy bomber unit, but the squadron does not appear to have been fully manned or equipped with operational aircraft while a reserve unit. In 1948 Continental Air Command (ConAC) assumed responsibility for managing reserve and Air National Guard units from ADC. President Truman’s reduced 1949 defense budget required reductions in the number of units in the Air Force. ConAC also reorganized its reserve units under the wing base organization system in June 1949. As a result, the squadron was inactivated and its personnel and equipment were transferred to elements of the 302d Troop Carrier Wing, which was activated simultaneously.

== Lineage ==
- Constituted as the 747th Bombardment Squadron (Heavy) on 14 May 1943

Activated on 1 June 1943
Redesignated 747th Bombardment Squadron, Heavy c. 5 March 1944
Redesignated 747th Bombardment Squadron, Very Heavy on 5 August 1945
Inactivated on 17 October 1945

- Activated in the reserve on 1 August 1947

Inactivated on 27 June 1949

=== Assignments ===
- 456th Bombardment Group, 1 June 1943 – 17 October 1945
- 456th Bombardment Group, 1 August 1947 – 27 June 1949

=== Stations ===
- Wendover Field, Utah, 1 June 1943
- Gowen Field, Idaho, 14 July 1943
- Bruning Army Air Field, Nebraska, 2 August 1943
- Kearns Army Air Base, Utah, 9 September 1943
- Muroc Army Air Field, California, 2 October–4 December 1943
- Cerignola Airfield, Italy, 11 January 1944
- Stornara Airfield, Italy, 25 January 1944 – 19 July 1945
- Sioux Falls Army Air Field, South Dakota, 1 August 1945
- Smoky Hill Army Air Field, Kansas, 17 August-17 October 1945
- McChord Field (later McChord Air Force Base), Washington, 12 July 1947 – 27 June 1949

=== Aircraft ===
- Consolidated B-24 Liberator, 1943–1945

=== Awards and campaigns ===
Award streamer	Award	Dates	Notes
	Distinguished Unit Citation	10 May 1944	Wiener Neustadt, Austria 747th Bombardment Squadron
	Distinguished Unit Citation	2 July 1944	Budapest, Hungary 747th Bombardment Squadron

Campaign Streamer	Campaign	Dates	Notes
	Air Offensive, Europe	11 January 1944 – 5 June 1944	747th Bombardment Squadron
	Air Combat, EAME Theater	11 January 1944 – 11 May 1945	747th Bombardment Squadron
	Naples-Foggia	11 January 1944 – 21 January 1944	747th Bombardment Squadron
	Anzio	22 January 1944 – 24 May 1944	747th Bombardment Squadron
	Rome-Arno	22 January 1944 – 9 September 1944	747th Bombardment Squadron
	Central Europe	22 March 1944 – 21 May 1945	747th Bombardment Squadron
	Southern France	15 August 1944 – 14 September 1944	747th Bombardment Squadron
	North Apennines	10 September 1944 – 4 April 1945	747th Bombardment Squadron
	Rhineland	15 September 1944 – 21 March 1945	747th Bombardment Squadron
	Po Valley	3 April 1945 – 8 May 1945	747th Bombardment Squadron

== See also ==
- B-24 Liberator units of the United States Army Air Forces
