= Project Moby Dick =

U.S. Air Force reconnaissance operation

Project 119L was a Cold War reconnaissance operation by the U.S. Air Force in which large espionage balloons floated cameras over the Soviet Union.

== Operations ==
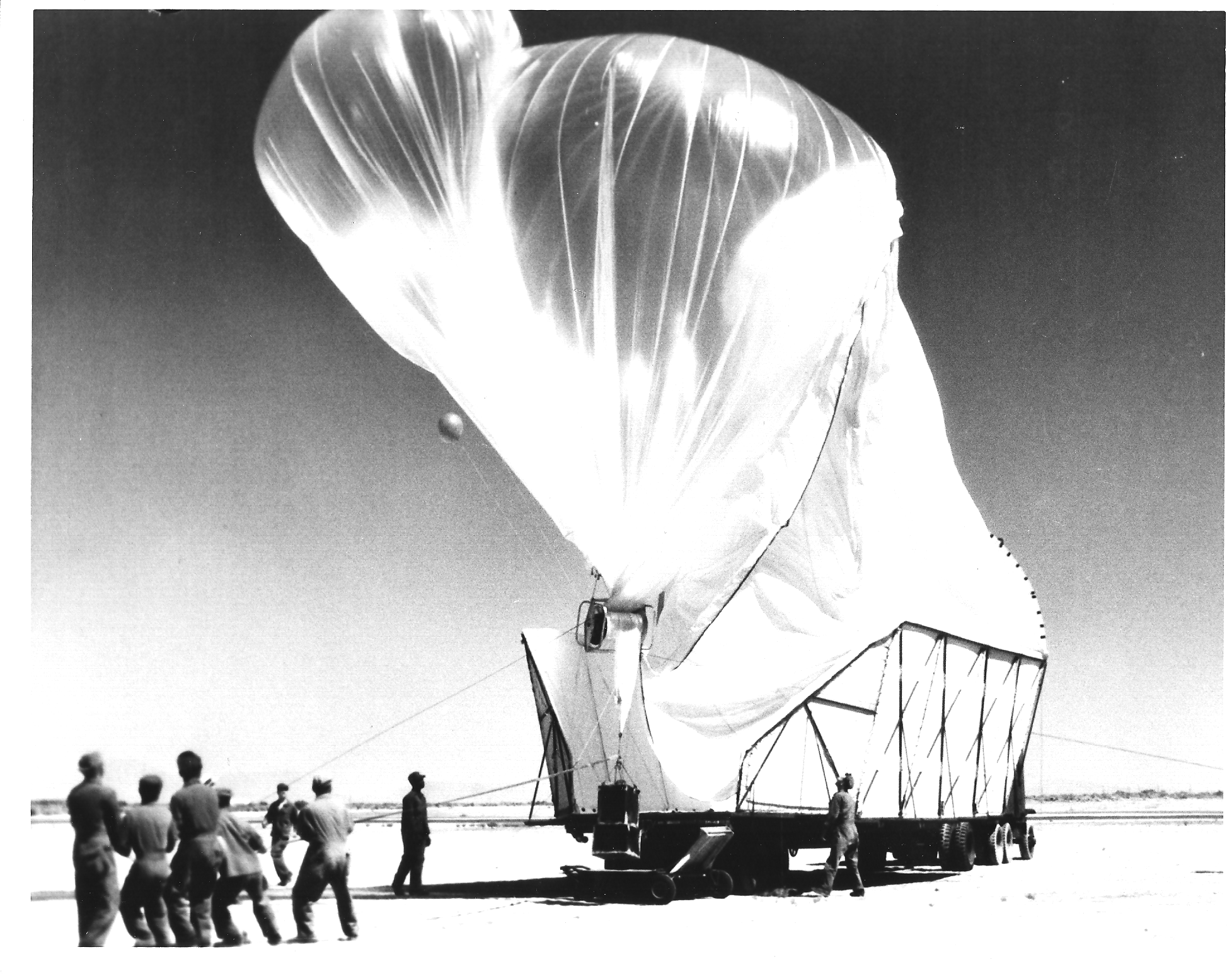
Launch of a MOBY DICK balloon at Holloman AFB, New Mexico

The spy balloons would photograph sensitive Soviet sites and either hang in the air or land in the Sea of Japan until either a crew flying the C-119 Flying Boxcar or a naval vessel retrieved them. The project caused a row between the U.S. and Soviet forces when the Soviets discovered the remnants of a U.S. spy camera in February 1956. Other reconnaissance balloon projects from the era included Project Skyhook, Project Mogul, Project Grandson, and Project Genetrix.

The previously conducted "Project Moby Dick" used much smaller balloons launched from what was called a "Covered Wagon". Their payloads were then tracked across the continental United States to map and study high altitude wind trajectories.

Project Flying Cloud, Weapons System 124A, was a derived concept to use balloons to deliver weapons of mass destruction.

== See also ==
- 456th Troop Carrier Wing
