= 903d Air Refueling Squadron =

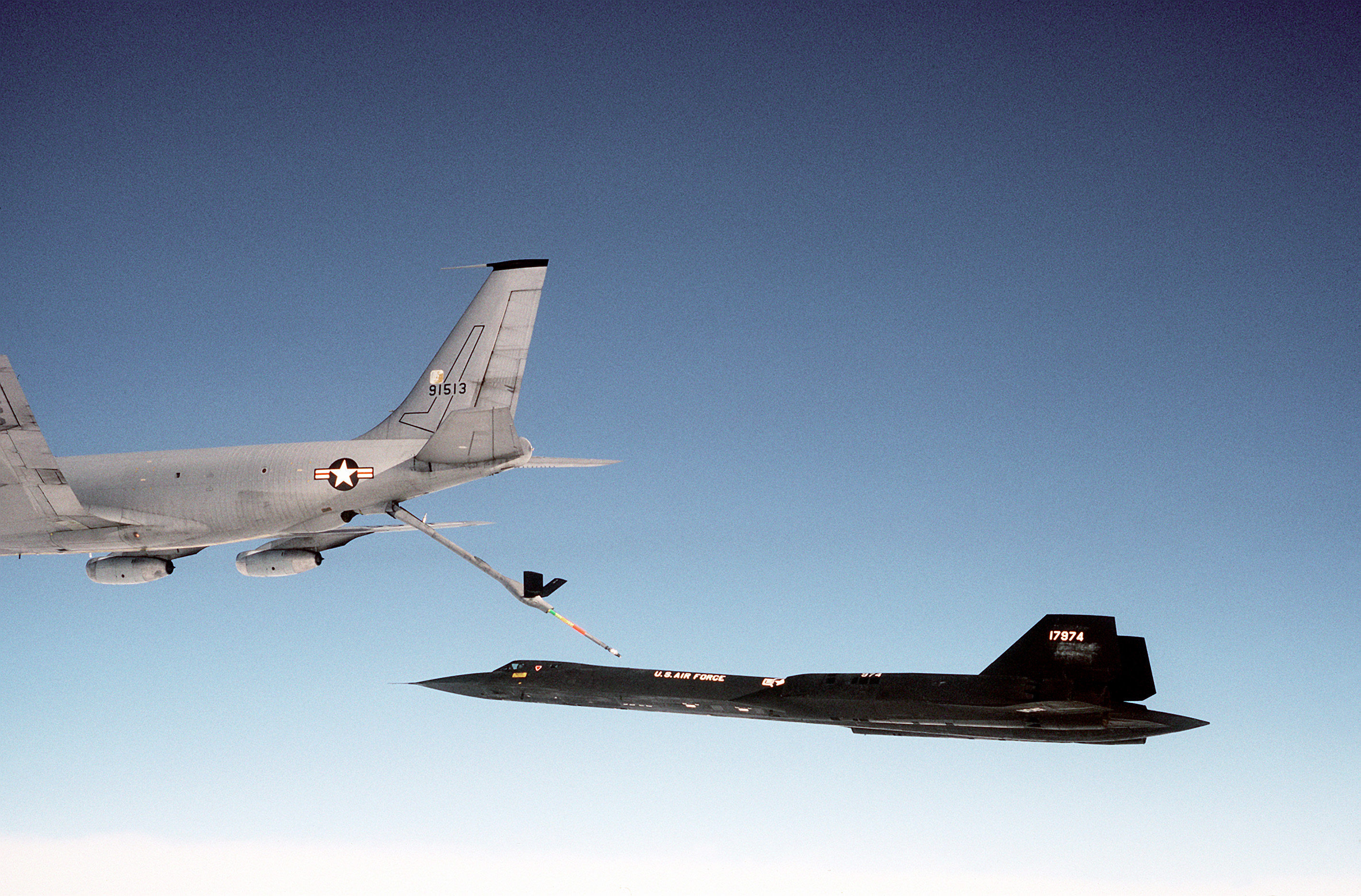
- Boeing KC-135Q refueling a SR-71 Blackbird
- Active: 1959–1976
- Country: United States
- Branch: United States Air Force
- Role: Air refueling
- Motto(s): Vires per Unitatem (Latin for 'Strength Through Unity')
- Decorations: Air Force Outstanding Unit Award

Insignia
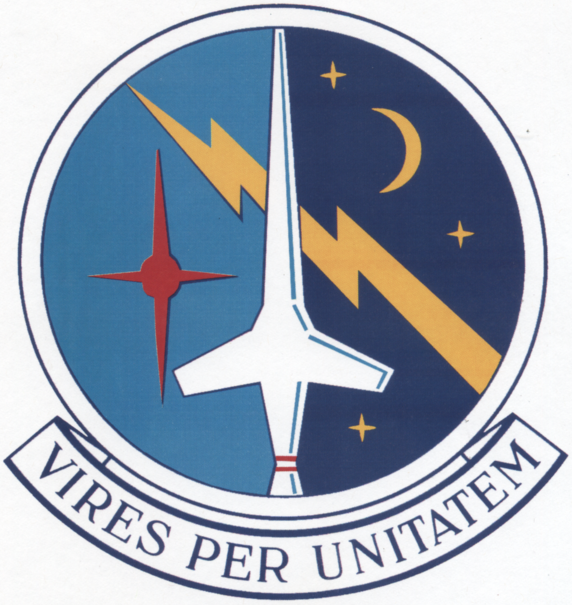
- 903d Air Refueling Squadron emblem

The 903d Air Refueling Squadron is an inactive United States Air Force unit. It was last assigned to the 17th Bombardment Wing, stationed at Beale Air Force Base, California. For much of its existence, the squadron focused on refueling SR-71 Blackbird aircraft, which were stationed at Beale after 1965. It was inactivated on 30 September 1976.

== History ==
The 903d Air Refueling Squadron was organized on 1 April 1959 by Strategic Air Command (SAC) at Beale Air Force Base, California It was assigned to the 4126th Strategic Wing and equipped with KC-135 Stratotankers. The 4126th wing was established by SAC in a program to disperse its Boeing B-52 Stratofortress bombers over a larger number of bases, thus making it more difficult for the Soviet Union to knock out the entire fleet with a surprise first strike. The squadron initially provided air refueling primarily to the B-52s of the 4126th wing. Half of the wing's aircraft were maintained on fifteen-minute alert, fully fueled, armed, and ready for combat until the squadron's deployment missions superseded alert requirements. It also deployed tankers to Alaska to support Operation Chrome Dome.

The 903d transferred to 456th Strategic Aerospace Wing in 1963 when SAC replaced its Major Command controlled (MAJCON) strategic wings with wings carrying the honors of World War II organizations. Later that year, the squadron supported Operation Greased Lightning, a speed record flight by B-58 Hustlers from Japan to England.

From the mid 1960s, the squadron concentrated on refueling SR-71 Blackbirds of the 4200th Strategic Reconnaissance Wing, and later, the 9th Strategic Reconnaissance Wing. Its tankers were modified to carry the PF-1 (later JP-7) fuel used by the SR-71s. The modified aircraft were later designated KC-135Qs. The squadron frequently deployed its aircraft and aircrews and often had its entire resources deployed at various locations. Its deployments included support for Operation Arc Light from Kadena Air Base, Okinawa and deployments to Torrejon Air Base, Spain. In 1963 and in 1967 the squadron won the Frank Ellis Trophy from Fifteenth Air Force for outstanding refueling performance.

The squadron was reassigned to the 17th Bombardment Wing in 1975 when the 17th replaced the 456th at Beale. The squadron inactivated in 1976 when the 100th Air Refueling Wing replaced the 17th and its mission, personnel and equipment were transferred to the 349th Air Refueling Squadron, which moved to Beale without personnel or equipment from Davis-Monthan Air Force Base, where it had been a reconnaissance unit.

== Lineage ==
- Constituted as the 903d Air Refueling Squadron, Heavy on 9 March 1959

Activated on 1 April 1959
Inactivated on 30 September 1976

=== Assignments ===
- 4126th Strategic Wing: 1 April 1959
- 456th Strategic Aerospace Wing (later 456th Bombardment Wing): 1 February 1963
- 17th Bombardment Wing: 30 September 1975 – 30 September 1976

=== Stations ===
- Beale Air Force Base, California, 1 April 1959 – 30 September 1976

=== Awards ===
| Award streamer | Award | Dates | Notes |
|---|---|---|---|
| | Air Force Outstanding Unit Award | 1 July 1963 – 30 June 1964 | |
| | Air Force Outstanding Unit Award | 1 July 1966 – 30 June 1967 | |

=== Aircraft ===
- Boeing KC-135 Stratotanker, 1959–1976

== See also ==
- List of United States Air Force air refueling squadrons
