= Operation Matterhorn =

War campaign in WWII

- Part of the Burma campaign, the South-East Asian, China Burma India and Pacific Theaters of World War II
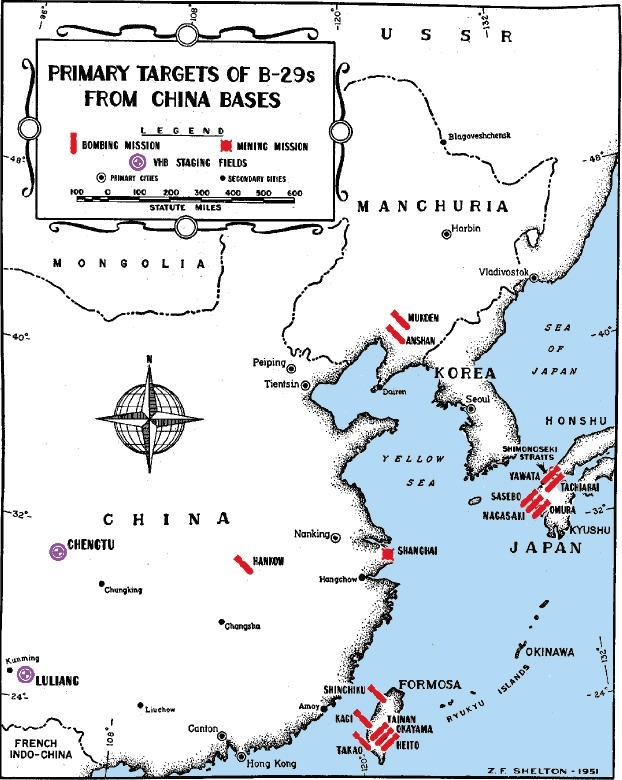
- B-29 bomber bases in China and the main targets they attacked in East Asia during Operation Matterhorn
- Location: East Asia and Southeast Asia
- Commanded by: Kenneth B. Wolfe; LaVerne Saunders; Curtis LeMay
- Date: 1944–1945
- Executed by: XX Bomber Command

Operation Matterhorn was a military operation of the United States Army Air Forces (USAAF) in World War II for strategic bombing of Japan by Boeing B-29 Superfortress bombers based in India, Ceylon, and China. Targets included industrial facilities in Japan and in Japanese-controlled China and Southeast Asia. The B-29s were based in India but staged through bases around Chengdu in China's Sichuan province. Since the Japanese had cut the Burma Road in 1942, the only line of communications with China was over "the Hump", as the air ferry route to China over the Himalayas was called. All the fuel, ammunition and supplies used by American forces in China had to be flown in.

To control the B-29s, the Joint Chiefs of Staff created the Twentieth Air Force under the command of General Henry H. Arnold, the chief of the USAAF, in Washington, DC. The role of the China Burma India Theater (CBI) commander, Lieutenant General Joseph W. Stilwell, was restricted to the provision of logistical support and the defense of the bases. The B-29 force in the CBI was the XX Bomber Command, under the command of Brigadier General Kenneth B. Wolfe. The B-29s required airbases with runways that were longer and stronger than those of smaller bombers. Five airfields in Bengal in India were upgraded to take them. Supplying fuel by rail would have placed too much strain on the railways, so a fuel pipeline to the airfields was laid from the port of Calcutta. The four B-29 airbases around Chengdu, along with five airstrips for fighters to defend them, were built by tens of thousands of Chinese laborers with hand tools.

The XX Bomber Command deployed to India between February and May 1944. On 5 June, Wolfe launched the first B-29 Superfortress combat mission, against the Japanese railroad facilities at Bangkok. Ten days later, 68 Superfortresses took off from the bases around Chengdu to bomb Imperial Iron and Steel Works in Yawata on Kyushu. The Bombing of Yawata was the first air raid on the Japanese home islands since the Doolittle Raid of April 1942, and it marked the beginning of the strategic bombardment campaign against Japan. Other targets included Singapore and the oil refineries around Palembang in the Netherlands East Indies. In October 1944, the XX Bomber Command carried out raids on Formosa in support of General Douglas MacArthur's upcoming return to the Philippines. Later that year, the Japanese offensive Operation Ichi-Go in China threatened the bases. To slow the advance, the XX Bomber Command attacked the Japanese-held city of Hankou with incendiary bombs. The attack left Hankou burning for three days, demonstrating the effectiveness of incendiaries against the predominantly wooden housing stock of the Far East.

In November 1944, American bombers began raiding Japan from the Mariana Islands. The XX Bomber Command abandoned the logistically difficult and increasingly vulnerable bases in China in January 1945, and concentrated its resources on rail and port facilities in Indochina, Thailand, and Burma. This signaled the end of Matterhorn. The 58th Bombardment Wing, the only operational wing of the XX Bomber Command, left India to join the XXI Bomber Command in the Marianas between February and April 1945.

Approximately 800 tons of bombs were dropped by China-based B-29s on Japanese home island targets between June 1944 and January 1945. This was insufficient to produce the desired results. Post-war analysis confirmed that the B-29s would have been better employed in attacks on Japanese shipping or oil facilities in the Southwest Pacific. During Matterhorn, the XX Bomber Command consumed almost 15 percent of the monthly Hump tonnage. Despite those objections, Matterhorn did benefit the Allied war effort by bolstering Chinese morale and demonstrating the B–29's effectiveness against Japanese fighters and anti-aircraft artillery. Subsequent operations from the Marianas profited from the streamlined organization and improved tactics developed during Matterhorn.

== Background ==
=== B-29 Superfortress ===
On 29 January 1940, the United States Army Air Corps issued a request to five major aircraft manufacturers to submit designs for a four-engine bomber with a range of 2,000 miles (3,200 km). These designs were evaluated, and on 6 September orders were placed for two experimental models each from Boeing and Consolidated Aircraft, which became the Boeing B-29 Superfortress and the Consolidated B-32 Dominator. These were known as very long range (VLR) bombers. (Note: The name "Superfortress" was not assigned until March 1944.) On 17 May 1941, Boeing was ordered to commence the manufacture of the B-29 when ready.

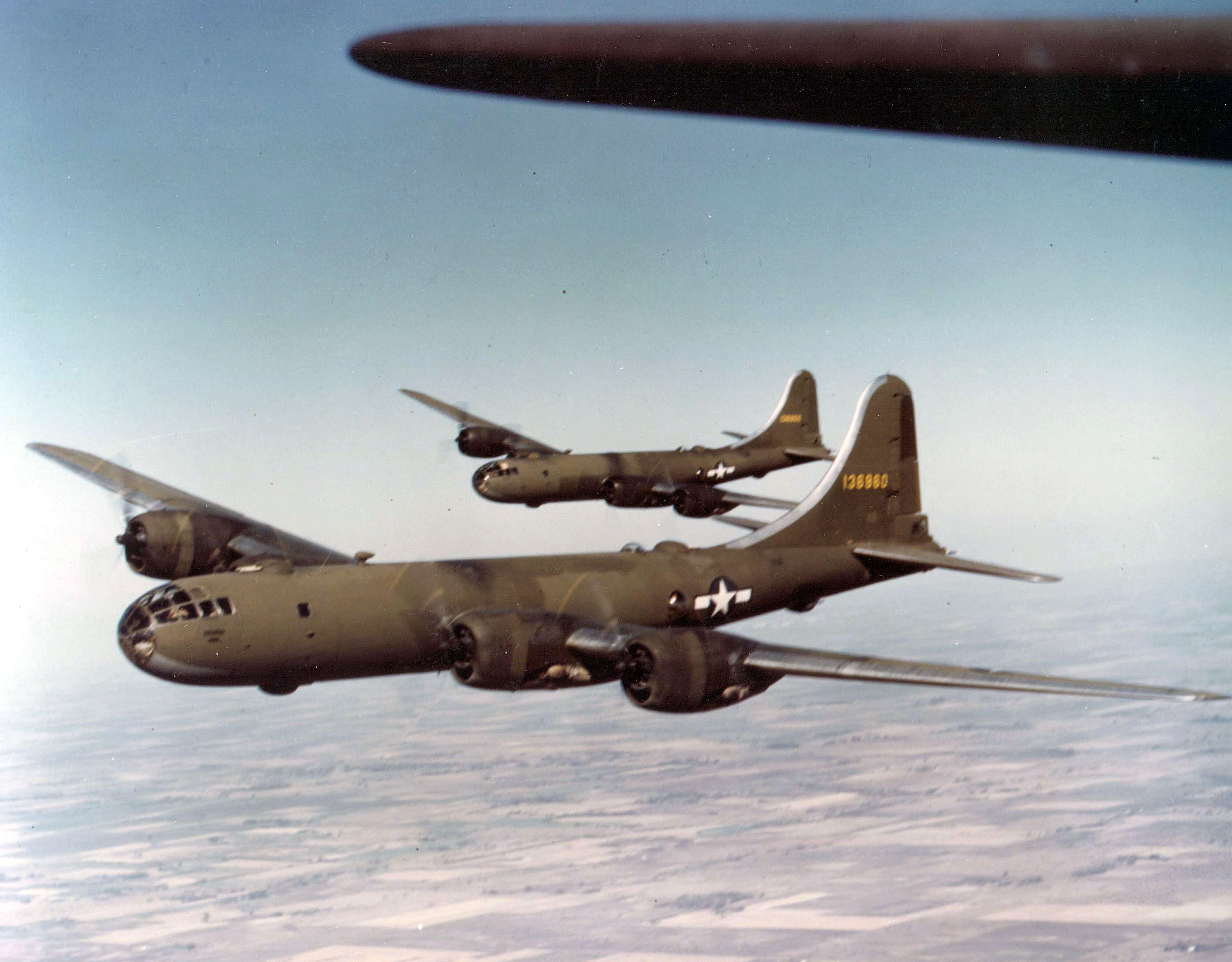
Early model YB-29s. Superfortress 41-36960 was the seventh YB-29 built.

Boeing devoted its plants in Renton, Washington, and Wichita, Kansas, to B-29 production; assemblies would later also be built by the Bell Aircraft Corporation in Marietta, Georgia, and the Glenn L. Martin Company in Omaha, Nebraska. A major recruiting and training program was required. Many of the workers were recruited from the surrounding areas, and had no experience in aircraft manufacturing. As they became more skilled, the man-hours required to build a B-29 was reduced from 150,000 to 20,000. The $3 billion cost of design and production (equivalent to $54 billion today), far exceeded the $1.9 billion cost of the Manhattan Project, and made the B-29 program the most expensive project of the war.

With its 141-foot (43 m) wingspan, the B-29 was one of the largest aircraft of World War II. It sported state-of-the-art technology, which included a pressurized cabin, dual-wheel tricycle landing gear, and an analog electromechanical computer-controlled fire-control system that allowed the four gunners to direct five remote machine gun turrets, each with twin Browning .50 caliber machine guns; the rear turret also had a 20-mm cannon. It was powered by four 18-cylinder, 2,200-horsepower (1,600 kW) Wright R-3350 Duplex-Cyclone radial engines, each with two turbochargers.

The cumulative effect of so many advanced features was more than the usual number of problems and defects associated with a new aircraft. This was compounded by efforts to fast track its introduction into service. These included engine malfunctions, jammed gears and dead power plants. The engines in particular had a large number of defects. The front and rear rows of the engine cylinders were located too close together for efficient cooling; there was insufficient lubrication of the upper cylinders; the reduction drive was prone to failure; and the carburetor produced an inefficient fuel mixture distribution. All of these factors contributed to engine overheating, which resulted in fires owing to an extensive use of magnesium in the crankshaft in order to save weight. In spite of 2,000 engineering changes, the engines remained susceptible to overheating.

=== Strategy ===
Ostensibly, the B-29 was intended to defend the Western Hemisphere against encroachment by a hostile foreign power, but as early as September 1939, Colonel Carl Spaatz had suggested that it might be used to bomb Japan from bases in Siberia, Luzon or the Aleutian Islands. The Air Corps' first war plan, AWPD-1, issued in September 1941, called for B-29s to bomb Germany from bases in Great Britain and Egypt by 1944. Early war plans did not contemplate bombing Japan until after the war against Germany was won. This continued to be the case after the Japanese attack on Pearl Harbor brought the Allies into war with Japan in December 1941. The idea of basing the Superfortresses in China first surfaced at the Casablanca Conference in January 1943. In March, the Assistant Chief of the Air Staff, Major General Laurence S. Kuter, initiated a detailed study of the possibility of using bombers based in China. No other bases within range of Japan were expected to be in Allied hands in 1944.

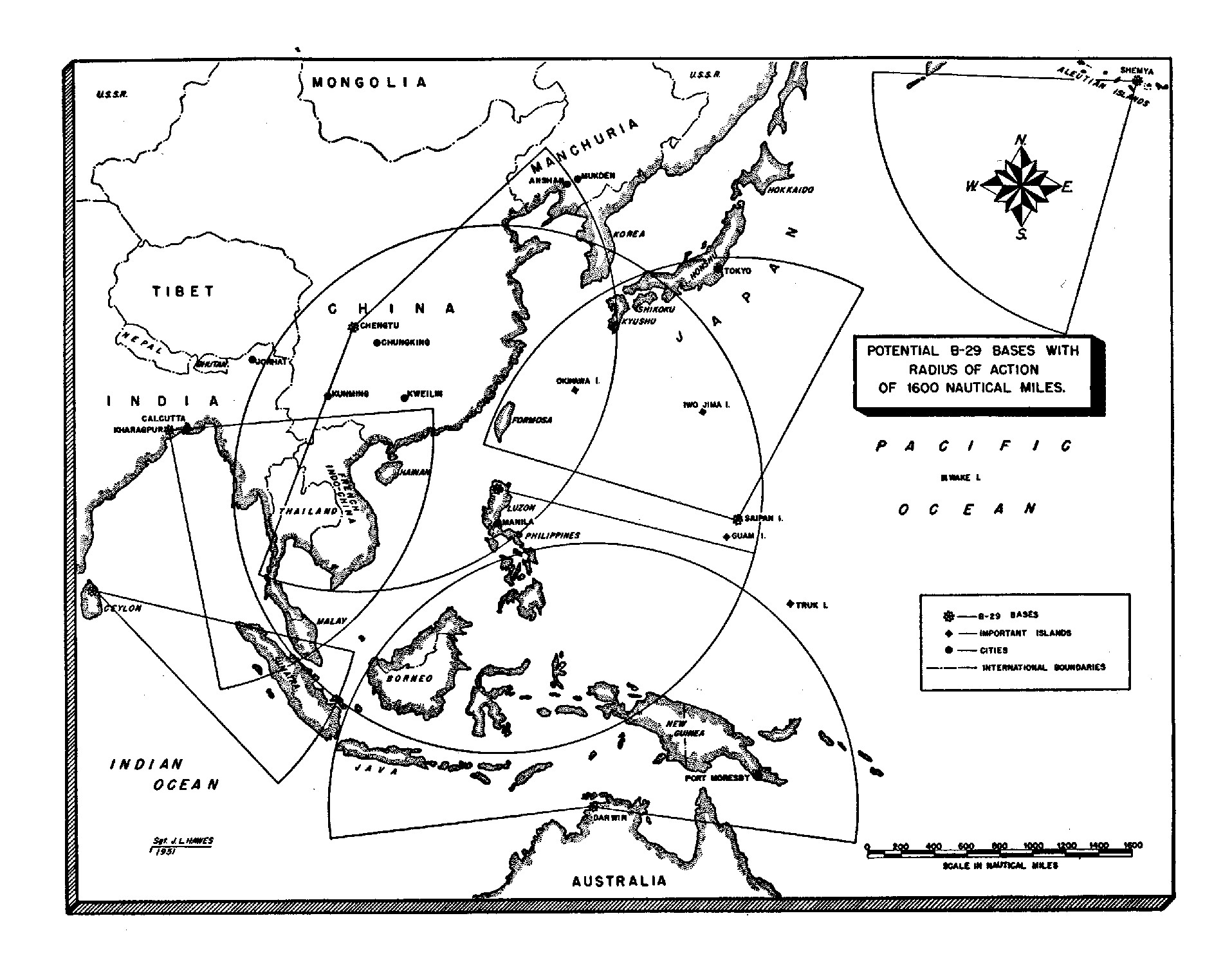
Potential bases for the B-29 bombers

Support for China was considered vital by American strategists, as a Chinese collapse would release a quarter of the Japanese Army's divisions for employment elsewhere. Logistic support for the war effort in China was through the port of Calcutta, which was estimated to be able to handle the additional 596,000 short tons (541,000 t) per month required by a bombing campaign. After the Japanese had cut the Burma Road in March 1942, the only line of communications with China was over "the Hump", as the air ferry route to China over the Himalayas was called. Until the Burma Road could be reopened by the ground forces, all the fuel, ammunition and supplies used by American forces in China had flown over the Hump.

The air planners estimated that the first raids on Japan could be mounted as early as April 1944. Their plan called for supplies for bombers based in China to be carried by Consolidated B-24 Liberator bombers converted to Consolidated C-87 Liberator Express transport aircraft. It was estimated that 200 C-87s would be required to support each B-29 bomber group, with 2,000 C-87s in operation by October 1944 and 4,000 by May 1945. Five missions per group per month could be flown, and 168 group-months was believed to be sufficient to destroy all targets in Japan within twelve months.

The staff of the China-Burma-India Theater (CBI) were invited to comment, and they opined that the plan was too sanguine regarding the logistical challenges involved. On request, the CBI Theater commander, Lieutenant General Joseph W. Stilwell, submitted an alternative plan drafted by his air commander, Major General George E. Stratemeyer, codenamed "Twilight", that called for more time, a smaller effort, and reduced logistical support. Under this plan, the bombers would be based in the Calcutta area and only staged through Chinese bases for missions. Keeping the ground crews in India would reduce the logistical footprint in China. Stilwell cautioned that the likely Japanese response to any success by the bombers would be a ground offensive to capture the airfields.

In April 1943, General Henry H. Arnold, the chief of the United States Army Air Forces (USAAF), set up a special B-29 project under Brigadier General Kenneth B. Wolfe. Wolfe became responsible for preparing, organizing and training B-29 units for combat. By September, he had prepared a plan for operations based on Twilight called "Matterhorn"; soon after the Twilight plan was renamed "Drake". The difference between Matterhorn and Drake was that under Matterhorn the B-29s would stage through Chengdu in Sichuan province in western China, whereas under Drake they would stage through Guilin in eastern China. Moving the B-29 bases to western China meant they would be further back from the front lines. This allowed the ground defense to be dispensed with, and the air defenses to be scaled back to two fighter groups that would be assigned to Major General Claire Chennault's China-based Fourteenth Air Force. The plan called for supplies to be stockpiled in China by the B-29s themselves, assisted by the B-24s of Fourteenth Air Force's 308th Bombardment Group. Arnold approved the Matterhorn plan on 12 October.

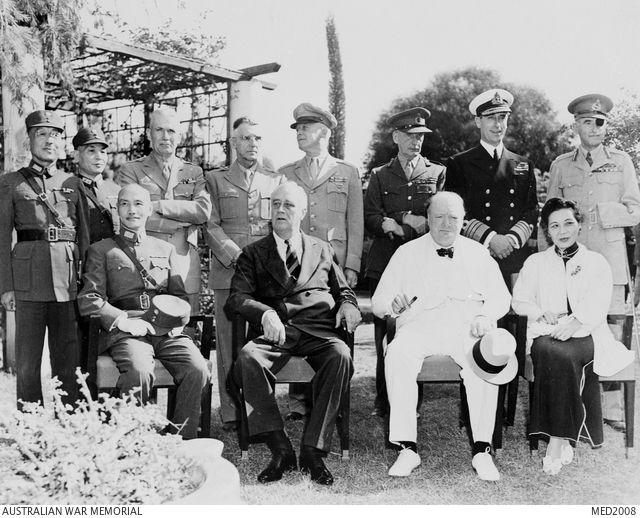
Cairo Conference. Back row, left to right: Shang Zhen, Ling Wei, Brehon Somervell, Joseph W. Stilwell, Henry H. Arnold, Sir John Dill, Lord Louis Mountbatten and Adrian Carton de Wiart. Front row: Chiang Kai-shek; Franklin D. Roosevelt, Winston Churchill and Soong Mei-ling.

On 10 November 1943, the president of the United States, Franklin D. Roosevelt, sent a message to the Prime Minister of the United Kingdom, Winston Churchill, asking him to render assistance with the construction of bases in India and one to Generalissimo Chiang Kai-shek asking him to provide labor and materials for the construction of five advanced bases in China, which the United States would pay for under Reverse Lend-Lease. Although Drake still had its advocates, Matterhorn was formally approved by Roosevelt and Churchill at the Second Cairo Conference on 7 December.

The British and American Combined Chiefs of Staff had authorized a Central Pacific drive that included the capture of the Gilbert and Marshall Islands, Truk, Palau and the Mariana Islands, but it was not considered likely that they would be available before 1945. The air staff planners began incorporating the Marianas into their plans as a potential base for the B-29s in September 1943. This was formally approved at Sextant. By January 1944, there was consideration of advancing the Central Pacific timetable by bypassing Truk and heading directly for Palau after the capture of the Marshalls, but senior army and navy officers in the Pacific doubted the utility of basing B-29s in the Marianas due to the limited harbor facilities there.

A study by the Joint War Plans Committee (JWPC) assessed the Mariana Islands as the best location for the deployment of the B-29s. However, since they would not be captured until later in the year, the JWPC recommended that the first B-29 groups be deployed to the Southwest Pacific Area to attack the petroleum refineries in the Netherlands East Indies, or to India and China to attack industrial targets in Japan. The timetable for the Central Pacific advance was revised in March 1944: Truk was to be bypassed and the Palau operation was postponed until 15 September, after the capture of the southern Mariana Islands, which was now scheduled to commence on 15 June 1944. The new timetable was approved by the Joint Chiefs of Staff (JCS) on 12 March.

=== Target selection ===
In March 1943, Arnold had asked the Committee of Operations Analysts (COA) to prepare an analysis of strategic targets in Japan whose destruction might affect the course of the war. Most of Japan's war industries lay within the 1,500-mile (2,400 km) range of a B-29 with a ten-ton bomb load flying from eastern China. The COA had been created in December 1942, and its membership included officers from the Army and Navy, along with distinguished civilian consultants such as Edward M. Earle, Thomas W. Lamont, Clark H. Minor and Elihu Root Jr. In a report delivered on 11 November 1943, they identified six priority economic targets: merchant shipping, steel production, urban industrial areas, aircraft plants, ball bearings, and electronics.

Particularly vulnerable was the ball bearing industry, which relied on six major plants, and the steel industry, which was dependent on a small number of coke plants located on Kyushu, the southernmost of the four main islands of Japan, in Manchuria and in Korea—all within range of the B-29s based at Chengdu. The analysts assessed the capacity of the Japanese steel industry at 13,690,000 short tons (12,420,000 t) per year, which was very close to the real figure, but they erroneously thought it was running at full capacity. In fact, the bombers would have to destroy 5,000,000 short tons (4,500,000 t) of capacity to have any impact on production.

The JWPC also considered targeting, but favored shipping and the oil industry, which could more easily be attacked from bases in Australia. The staff of the USAAF accepted the importance of targeting shipping, but it was not what the B-29 was designed for. As for the oil industry, the oil refineries in the Dutch East Indies, primarily the ones at Palembang, could be attacked by the B-29s based in India, staging through Ceylon. The JCS approved the Matterhorn plan on 10 April 1944, but cut the force to just one wing of four groups. In recognition of the accelerated schedule for the capture of the Marianas, the second B-29 wing would be sent there instead, or to Australia if bases in the Marianas were not yet ready.

== Command and organization ==
To control the B-29s, the 58th Bombardment Wing was activated at Marietta Army Air Field, near Bell's B-29 plant, on 1 June 1943, and Wolfe assumed command on 21 June. Although he had experience in engineering and development in the United States and the Philippines, and an excellent knowledge of the B-29, he had no upper echelon command or operational experience. He did however have a free hand in selecting officers for his organization. Many came from his former command at Wright Field, Ohio, including the leading expert on the B-29, Colonel Leonard F. Harman, who became his deputy. For his assistant chief of staff for operations (A-3), he secured Brigadier General LaVerne G. Saunders, who had been awarded the Navy Cross while in command of the 11th Bombardment Group during the Guadalcanal campaign.

The Second Air Force provided four airfields for training in the vicinity of Salina, Kansas, not far from Boeing's Wichita plant where most of the early model B-29s were made, and the 58th Bombardment Wing moved its headquarters to Smoky Hill Army Air Field near Salina on 15 September. The wing was initially under the direct control of USAAF headquarters, but on 11 October it was assigned to the Second Air Force. The XX Bomber Command was activated in Salina, on 27 November 1943, with Wolfe as its commander, and Harman became the commander of the 58th Bombardment Wing.

58th Bombardment Wing
Group	Commander	Location
40th Bombardment Group	Colonel Lewis R. Parker	Pratt Army Air Field, Pratt, Kansas
444th Bombardment Group	Colonel Alva L. Harvey	Great Bend Army Air Field, Great Bend, Kansas
462nd Bombardment Group	Colonel Richard H. Carmichael	Walker Army Air Field, Victoria, Kansas
468th Bombardment Group	Colonel Howard E. Engler	Smoky Hill Army Air Field, Smoky Hill, Kansas

The group commanders had a wealth of experience. The 444th Bombardment Group was led by Colonel Alva L. Harvey, who had been a test pilot for the Boeing B-17 Flying Fortress bombers and had participated in the first American bombing raid on Berlin. Colonel Richard H. Carmichael led the 462nd Bombardment Group; he had formerly commanded the 19th Bombardment Group in the Southwest Pacific Area, and had led the first B-17 raid on Rabaul in February 1943. Colonel Howard E. Engler commanded the 468th Bombardment Group until August 1944, when he was replaced by Colonel Ted S. Faulkner. The 40th Bombardment Group was commanded by Colonel Lewis R. Parker. He was sent to England to obtain combat experience with the Eighth Air Force and was shot down on his second mission over Germany on 6 March 1944. He was replaced by Harman in April 1944; Saunders succeeded him as commander of the 58th Bombardment Wing.

The table of organization and equipment for the B-29 groups was authorized on 13 January 1944. Each aircraft had a crew of eleven. Five were officers: the pilot-commander, co-pilot, two navigator-bombardiers, and the flight engineer. The other six were enlisted personnel: an engine mechanic, electrical specialist, power-plant specialist, central fire-control specialist, radio operator, and radar operator. Each squadron had seven aircraft, and each of the four groups had four squadrons, so the wing had 112 B-29s. Each B-29 had two crews, so the wing had 3,045 officers, 8 warrant officers and 8,099 enlisted men. With the service and maintenance units and aviation engineers to build the airfields, Wolfe would have had about 20,000 men under its command.

XX Bomber Command Order of Battle XX Bomber Command

10th Photo Tech Unit

58th Bombardment Wing
40th Bombardment Group	444th Bombardment Group	462nd Bombardment Group	468th Bombardment Group
25th, 44th, 45th, 395th Bombardment Squadrons (Note: The 395th, 679th, 771st and 795th Bombardment Squadrons were disbanded in October 1944.)	676th, 677th, 678th, 679th Bombardment Squadrons	768th, 769th, 770th, 771st Bombardment Squadrons	792nd, 793rd, 794th, 795th Bombardment Squadrons
28th Air Service Group	25th Air Service Group	86th Air Service Group	87th Air Service Group
1st, 2nd, 3rd, 4th Bomb Maintenance Squadrons (Note: The bomb maintenance squadrons were disbanded in October 1944.)	5th, 6th, 7th, 8th Bomb Maintenance Squadrons	9th, 10th, 11th, 12th Bomb Maintenance Squadrons	13th, 14th, 15th, 16th Bomb Maintenance Squadrons
11th Photo Lab	12th Photo Lab	13th Photo Lab	14th Photo Lab

Wolfe and an advanced echelon of his XX Bomber Command staff arrived in New Delhi on 13 January 1944, where he met with Stratemeyer. On 3 February he met with Stilwell at the latter's advanced headquarters in Burma to discuss command arrangements. They agreed that the XX Bomber Command should not come under Chennault's command, nor under that of Stratemeyer, who was answerable to Admiral Lord Louis Mountbatten, the commander of South East Asia Command (SEAC). Stilwell feared that Chennault would use the B-29s to attack Japanese shipping and thereby provoke a strong Japanese reaction that would be beyond the ability of the Chinese army to oppose. He therefore issued a directive on 15 February that placed the XX Bomber Command under his own direct command and control "following general directives from the United States Joint Chiefs of Staff".

Command and control of the B-29s was subject to further debate among the JCS. To avoid the B-29s being misused on the battlefields when they would be much more useful against the Japanese home islands, the Commander in Chief, United States Fleet, Admiral Ernest J. King, suggested that an air force be created under Arnold's command. Arnold would be responsible for its administration and logistical support, and would control it as the executive agent of the JCS, who would determine its deployment and missions. On 28 March, the JCS ordered that the China-based B-29s would be commanded from USAAF headquarters in Washington, D.C. The JCS approved the establishment of the Twentieth Air Force on 4 April 1944. This gave the USAAF equal status with the ground and naval forces in Asia and the Pacific for the first time. Stilwell's role was restricted to providing logistical support and the defense of the B-29's bases.

Brigadier General Haywood S. Hansell Jr., the Deputy Chief of the Air Staff and the Acting Assistant Chief of the Air Staff for Plans, was appointed the chief of staff of the Twentieth Air Force. As the air member of the JWPC, he was familiar with plans for the deployment and use of the B-29. He held his first staff meeting on 12 April. He became the de facto commander of the Twentieth Air Force, as Arnold's responsibilities as chief of the USAAF did not allow him to exercise day-to-day control over the Twentieth Air Force, especially after he suffered a heart attack on 10 May 1944.

== Training and preparation ==
As well as the recruitment of senior staff, Wolfe was authorized to procure twenty-five pilots and twenty-five navigators with experience of long over-water flights in four-engine aircraft. The training of the crews of the 58th Bombardment Wing was rendered difficult by the shortage of B-29s. The first prototype XB-29 was turned over to the USAAF shortly after the 58th Bombardment Wing was formed in June 1943, but the first production B-29 did not arrive until August. In the meantime, crews trained on fifty Martin B-26 Marauders. These were subsequently replaced by B-17s, which were more like the B-29. By November 1943 there was still only one B-29 between twelve crews. A month later they had flown an average of just 18½ hours in the B-29, and only sixty-seven commander-pilots were fully qualified on the B-29. In view of this, the number of crews to be trained was reduced to 240, and the date of completion of their training was postponed from 1 February to 1 March.

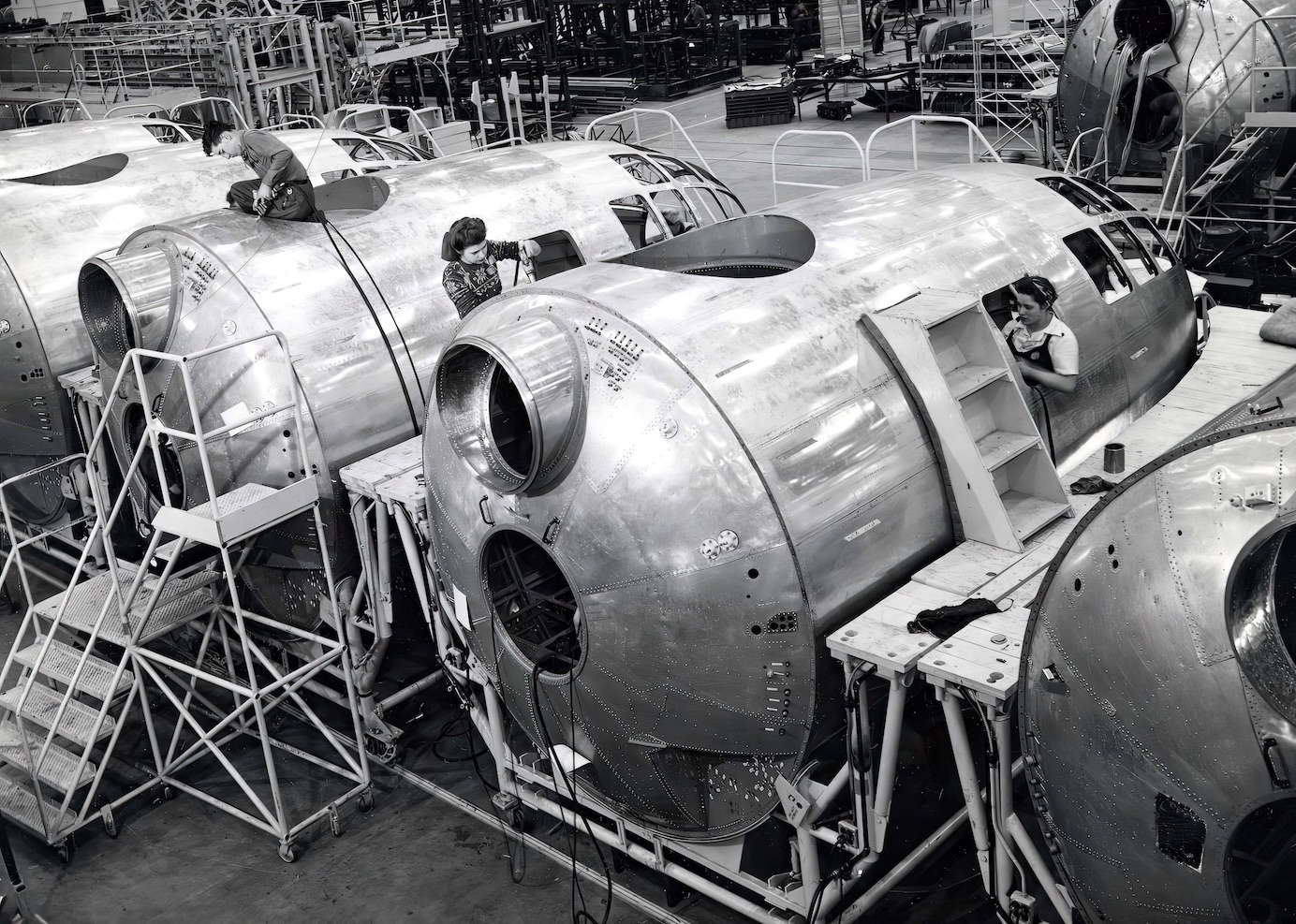
Workers assemble the forward compartment of a B-29 at the Boeing plant in Seattle, Washington

By February 1944, the entire XX Bomber Command had only flown 9,000 hours in B-29s, and few of these were above 20,000 feet (6,100 m) due to issues with the power plant. Ninety-seven B-29s had been delivered, but only two of them had the central fire control system installed, and it had not been fully tested. The late delivery of the aircraft seriously dislocated the crew training program, and many of the crews lacked sufficient training in high-altitude formation flying, gunnery, and visual and radar bombing.

Arnold had hoped that the B-29s would be ready by January 1944, but on 12 October 1943 he notified Roosevelt:

In connection with the bombing of Japan from China by B-29s, I regret exceedingly to have to inform you that there has been a holdup in production of engines. It looks now as if it will be impossible to get the required number of B-29s together in China to start bombing before the first of March, and with the possibility of not getting them there before the first of April. At this writing I expect to have 150 B-29s in China by March 1st, of which 100 can be used against Japan.

He visited the B-29 plant in Wichita on 11 January 1944 and had his name written on the 175th aircraft, and told the workers that he wanted it delivered by 1 March 1944. The aircraft, Superfortress 42-6365 General H. H. Arnold Special, was delivered on 24 February 1944. Changes disrupted the delivery of key parts. Because so many modifications had been made while the aircraft were being built, it had become standard practice to fly new B-29s direct from the factory to a modification center to be upgraded. The modification centers were overworked, and had limited hangar space, so much of their work had to be done in the open air. When Arnold visited Pratt Army Air Field on 8 March 1944, he found no B-29s ready for combat.

Arnold designated Brigadier General Bennett E. Meyers, who was traveling with him, as special project cocoordinator, with responsibility for getting the B-29s ready. Meyers chose Colonel Clarence S. Irvine as his deputy. Boeing provided 600 workers, although this slowed work on the production lines. The deficiencies of each aircraft were cataloged and spare parts were obtained. Work was carried out in appalling Kansas winter conditions, with snowstorms and outdoor temperatures between −2 and 20 °F (−19 and −7 °C). By 15 April, 150 aircraft were combat ready.

== Base development ==
=== India ===
The Twentieth Air Force asked for B-29 runways to be 8,500 feet (2,600 m) long and 200 feet (61 m) wide, nearly twice the area of the standard 6,000 by 150 feet (1,829 by 46 m) runway for the B-17, the next largest aircraft in the inventory. The plan was to enlarge and improve five existing runways in the flatlands west of Calcutta to bring them up to B-29 standard. Five airfields were selected on 17 November: Bishnupur, Piardoba, Kharagpur, Kalaikunda and Chakulia. Wolfe's advance party from the XX Bomber Command inspected the fields in December and accepted all but Bishnupur, for which Dudhkundi was substituted.

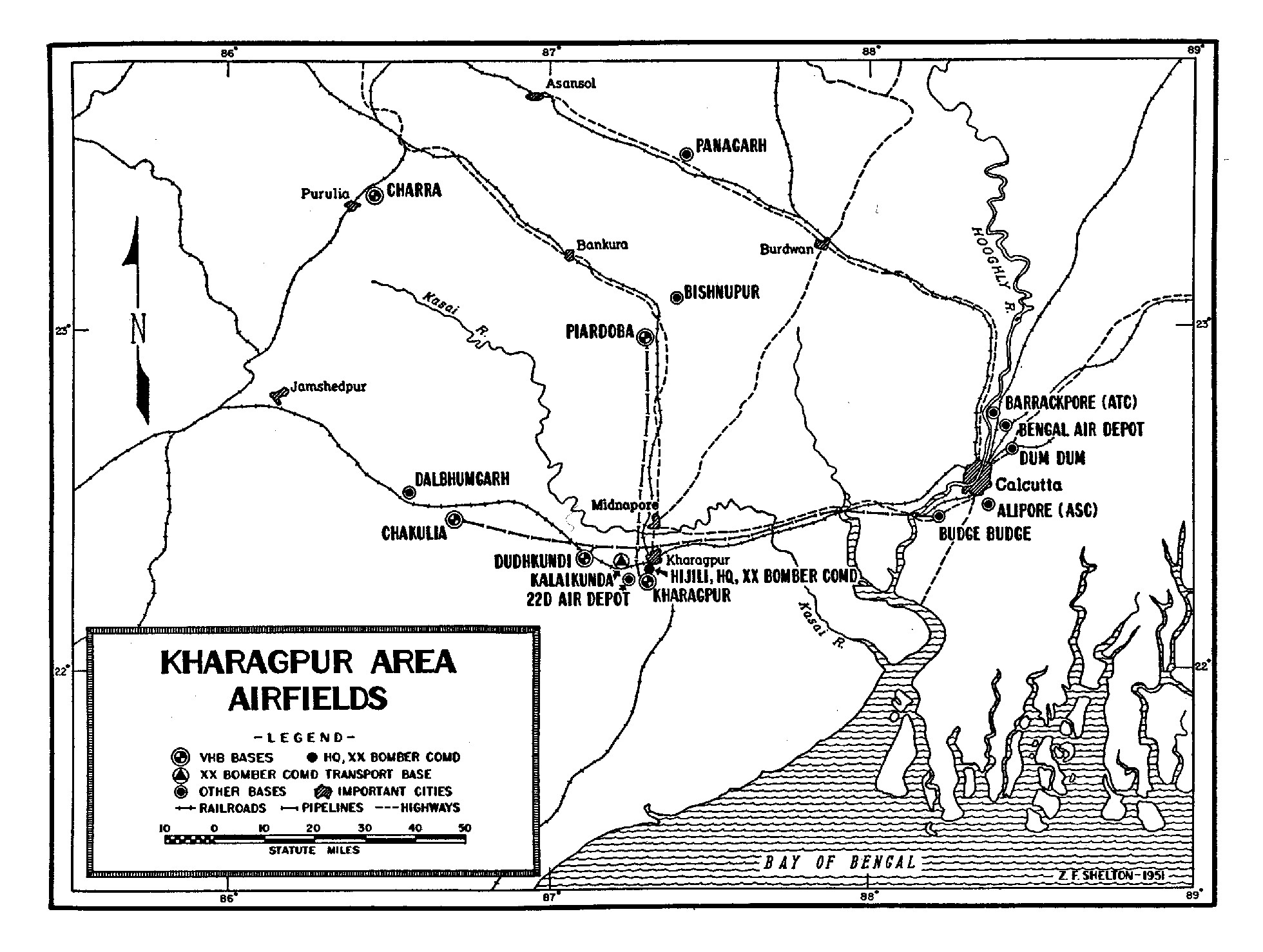
Kharagpur area airfields

Work was carried out by US Army engineer units with imported materials and local labor. Lieutenant Colonel Kenneth E. Madsen was in charge of construction of the air bases; Colonel William C. Kinsolving, a petroleum engineer, had the task of laying two four-inch (100 mm) pipelines to the airfields. They reported to Colonel Thomas Farrell, who headed the CBI Construction Service.

Each air base required four months' work by an engineer aviation battalion. To meet the April deadline, the engineer units should have been in place by December, but they were still in the United States. Stilwell gave them priority for shipping, and they set out on a convoy that sailed on 15 December. Traveling via North Africa, they reached India in February 1944, but their unit equipment did not begin to arrive until 15 April, and was not complete until 30 June. With its arrival, Madsen had 6,000 engineers and 27,000 Indian civilians under contract from India's Central Public Works Department on the job.

Works were not completed until September. The decision in April to deploy the second wing of B-29s to the Marianas meant that only four groups deployed to CBI instead of the original eight, so only the five original airfields were required. Delays in construction at Dudhkundi meant that Charra Airfield had to be used temporarily. The B-24 runway there was extended to accommodate the 444th Bombardment Group until Dudhkundi was ready in July. The total cost of constructing the airbases was estimated at $20 million (equivalent to $365.78 million in 2025).

=== China ===
Lieutenant Colonel Henry A. Byroade was appointed the project engineer responsible for the construction of the B-29 airfields in China. He personally reconnoitered the Chengdu area in November 1943, and in his report on 8 December he selected four B-29 airbase sites, Xinjin, Guanghan, Qionglai and Pengshan, where existing runways could be strengthened and lengthened to accommodate the B-29s. In addition, there were five airstrips for fighters.

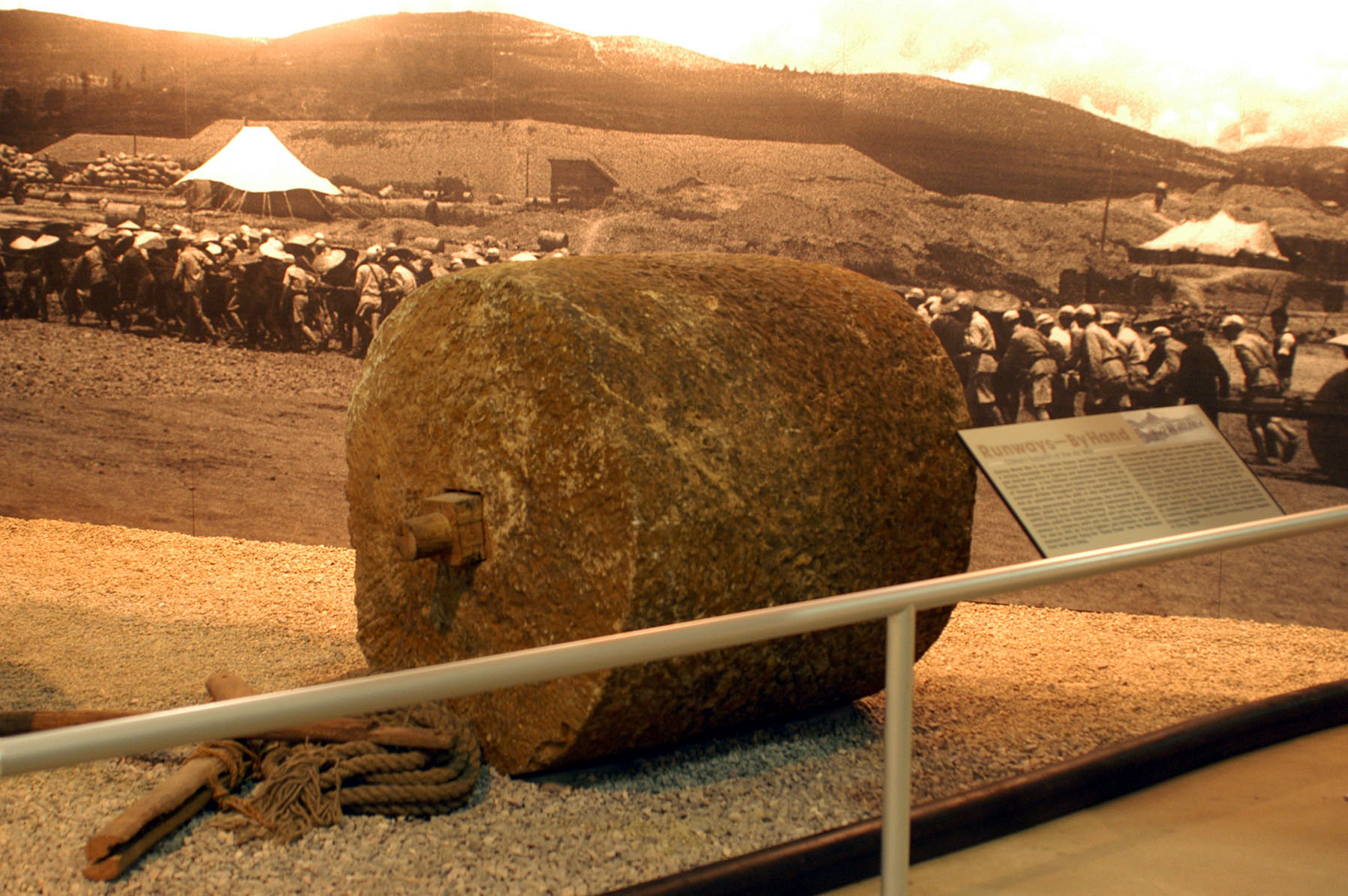
Chinese stone roller on display in the Air Power Gallery at the National Museum of the United States Air Force. Up to 300 workers pulled these stone rollers.

At the Sextant Conference in Cairo, Roosevelt promised Chiang that the United States would fully reimburse China for the labor and materials expended on Matterhorn. The Chinese estimated that the airbases would cost two to three billion Chinese yuan, around $100 to $150 million (equivalent to $1,500 to $2,200 million in 2025), at least at the official rate of exchange; on the black market an American dollar fetched up to 240 Chinese yuan. Stilwell suspected that half of this sum was in the form of "squeeze" (bribes and commissions), an accepted business practice in China. "One more example", he wrote in his diary, "of the stupid spirit of concession that proves to them that we are suckers."

Landowners were inadequately compensated for the loss of their land and the peasants who worked it were not compensated at all. Construction work was supervised by Lieutenant Colonel Waldo I. Kenerson. Only fourteen U.S. Army engineers were assigned to the project. Some 300,000 impressed laborers and 75,000 contract workers were employed. Contract workers were paid on a piecework basis, and averaged about 25 Chinese yuan per day. This was barely sufficient to buy food, so many had to be supported by their families.

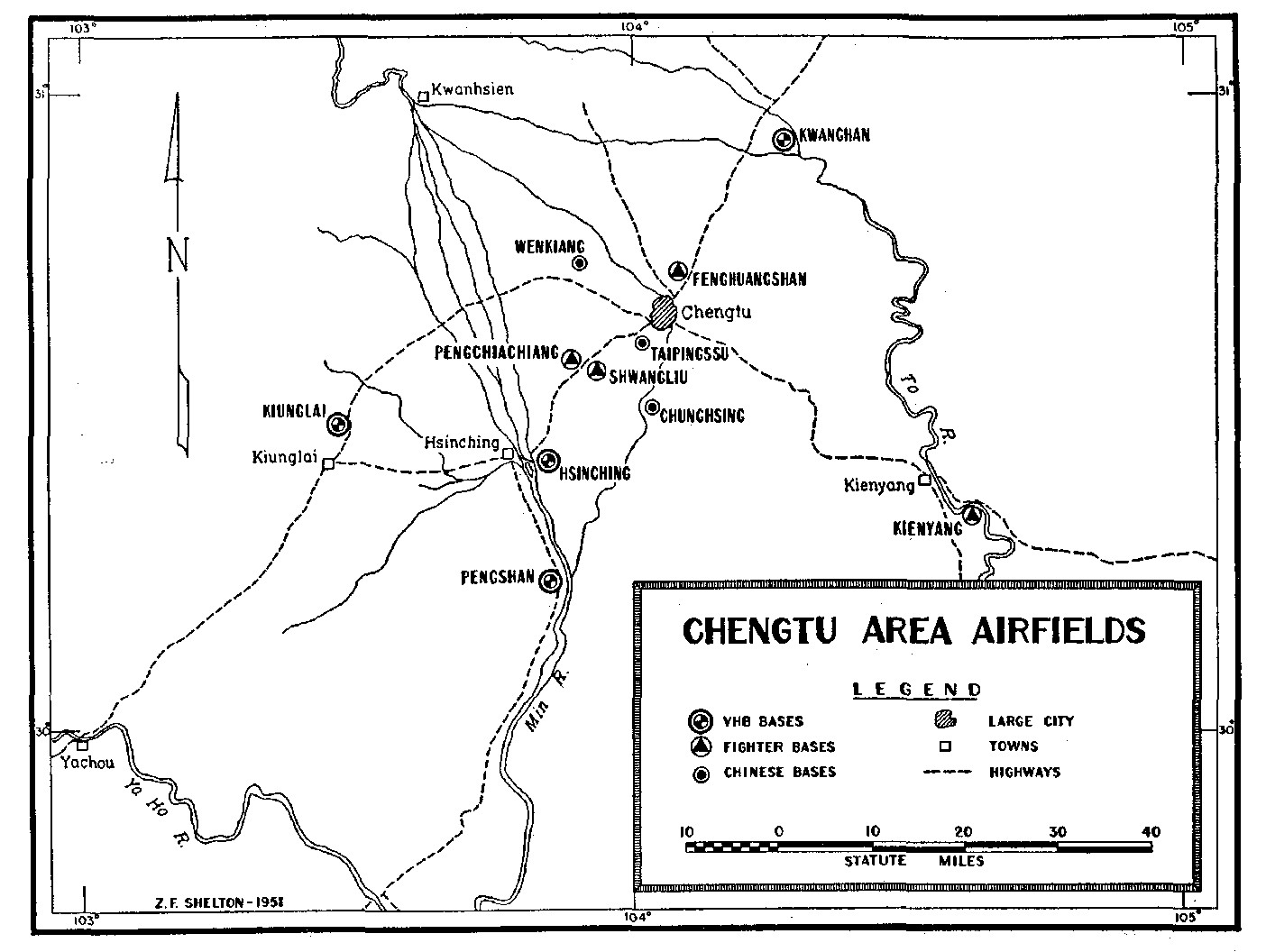
B-29 airfields in the Chengdu area

There were no bulldozers, power shovels or graders. Some 1,000 ox carts, 15,000 wheelbarrows and 1,500 trucks were used to carry building materials. The topsoil and some of the subsoil was removed with hoes, and was carried away in wicker baskets on shoulder poles by men and boys. The subsoil was rolled flat using huge stone rollers hauled by up to 300 workers. A layer of pebbles taken from nearby streams was laid down using wheelbarrows. Saunders landed the first B-29 at Guanghan on 24 April, where he was met by officials including Wolfe, Chennault and Zhang Qun, the governor of Sichuan Province. All four airfields were completed by 10 May 1944.

=== Ceylon ===
In addition to the raids on Japan from bases in China, the Sextant Conference also approved attacks on the oil refineries in the Dutch East Indies by B-29s based in India, staging through Ceylon, with a target date of 20 July 1944. Although the southeast corner of Ceylon would have been the best location from a tactical point of view, being closest to Palembang, it was rejected due to the poor communications with that part of the island. The British extended the airfield at China Bay to accommodate 56 B-29s.

== Deployment ==
=== Sealift and airlift ===
The Matterhorn plan called for 20,000 troops and 200,000 short tons (180,000 t) of cargo to be shipped from the United States to CBI between 1 January and 30 June 1944, followed by 20,000 short tons (18,000 t) of fuel per month starting in April 1944. This would not have been a major undertaking for the European Theater of Operations, but movement to CBI was complicated by the long distance from the United States, the poor state of communications within the theater, and the low priority of CBI, especially with regard to shipping. The proviso at Sextant that Matterhorn shipments not materially affect other approved operations in CBI conflicted with the tight timetable.

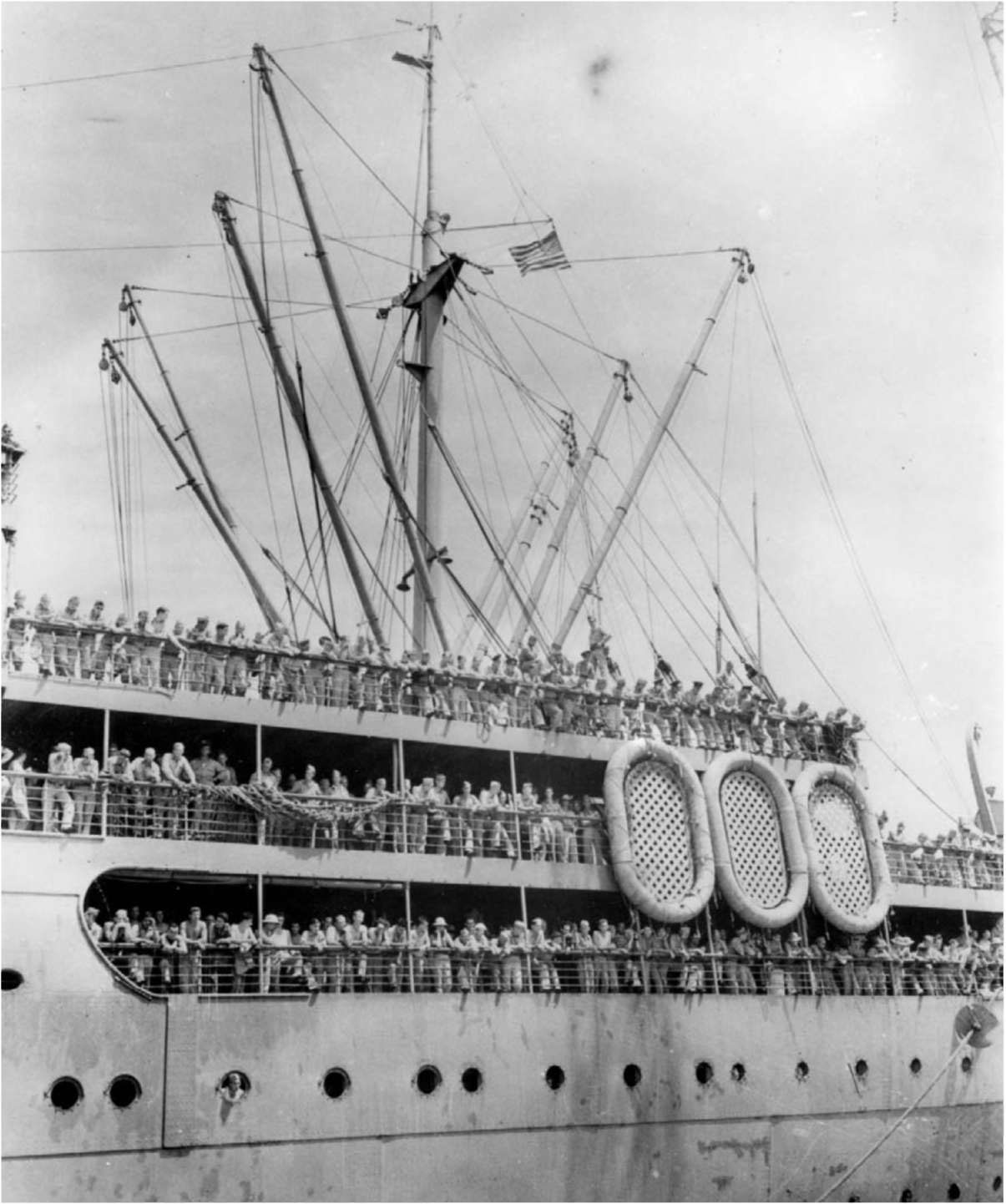
U.S. troops aboard a transport waiting to go ashore at a port in India.

High priority passengers and freight traveled by air. The advance party of the XX Bomber Command, which included Wolfe, left Morrison Field in twenty C-87 transports on 5 January 1944 and arrived in New Delhi eight days later. Wolfe established his headquarters at Kharagpur, which was situated at a junction on the Bengal Nagpur Railway lines serving the airfields. The Hijli Detention Camp was taken over to serve as his headquarters building.

It was originally intended that all air crews would fly in B-29s, but this was discarded in favor of carrying a spare engine in each plane. Twenty-five Douglas C-54 Skymaster aircraft carried 1,252 passengers and 250 replacement Wright R-3350 engines. Stilwell provided this from CBI's allotment of Air Transport Command (ATC) flights. The trip could take as few as six days, but personnel were often bumped in favour of more important passengers, and many took over a month.

The ground echelons traveled by sea. A contingent that included seven of the bomb maintenance squadrons departed from Newport News on 12 February and reached Bombay on 25 April. Eight bomb maintenance squadrons embarked from Los Angeles on the troopship USS Mount Vernon on 27 February, and sailing via Melbourne, Australia, they reached Bombay on 31 March. From there it took a week to travel across India to Kharagpur by train. One contingent made the trip from the United States to Kharagpur in 34 days, but most took eight to ten weeks. On 10 May, the XX Bomber Command reported 21,930 personnel on hand. This included a few who were already stationed in CBI, and several hundred who had arrived by air, but about 20,000 of them had arrived by sea in March and April.

=== B-29 deployment ===
The construction of airfields in China and India with unusually long runways could not be concealed from the Japanese. Nonetheless, the B-29 Hobo Queen, commanded by Colonel Frank R. Cook, flew to RAF Bassingbourn in the UK on 8 March as part of a deception plan that the B-29 would be deployed to Europe. It departed the UK on 1 April, and became the second B-29 to reach its destination when it touched down at Kharagpur on 6 April; the first, Gone With the Wind, piloted by Harman, reached Chakulia on 2 April. The B-29s of the 58th Bombardment Wing began departing for India on 24 March, setting out in daily increments of nine or ten aircraft, with the trip expected to take up to five days. The chosen route was from Salina to Gander Lake (2,580 miles, 4,150 km), Marrakesh (2,700 miles, 4,300 km), Cairo (2,350 miles, 3,780 km), Karachi (2,400 miles, 3,900 km) and Calcutta (1,500 miles, 2,400 km), a total of 11,530 miles (18,560 km). Air crew were not informed of their final destination before departure.

By 15 April, only 32 aircraft had arrived at their stations. One B-29 crashed on takeoff from Marrakesh after the pilot forgot to extend the flaps. Another was grounded in Cairo for two weeks while engineers replaced all four engines. Two were lost in Cairo; one developed engine trouble soon after takeoff and crashed and burned on landing when it attempted to land, while another crashed on landing when its nose landing gear collapsed. All the crewmen survived these accidents, but five died when a B-29 crashed in Karachi in a sandstorm. Another was also lost there, and all B-29s were grounded from 21 to 29 April while investigations were conducted into the causes. In all, five B-29s were lost and four damaged en route, but 130 aircraft had arrived safely by 8 May. (Note: By March 1945 another 255 B-29s had made their way to CBI, and only three were lost en route.) Wolfe reported to Arnold on 26 April 1944 that: "The airplanes and crews got off to a bad start due to late production schedules, difficult modifications, inclement weather, and the sheer pressure of time necessary to meet the early commitment date."

Operating bases
Group	Assigned to	Forward deployment
40th Bombardment Group	Chakulia Airfield, India	Xinjin Airfield (A-1), China
444th Bombardment Group	Dudhkundi Airfield, India (Note: The 444th Bombardment Group was based at Charra Airfield until July, but that base was not capable of sustaining very heavy bomber operations.)	Guanghan Airfield (A-3), China
462nd Bombardment Group	Piardoba Airfield, India	Qionglai (Linqiong) Airfield (A-5), China
468th Bombardment Group	Kalaikunda Airfield, India	Pengshan Airfield (A-7), China

=== Fighters ===
The deception plan was a failure; the Japanese made it known through radio broadcasts that they were well aware of the deployment of the B-29s. Although Calcutta was bombed, the B-29 airfields in Bengal lay close to the limit of the range of Japanese bombers. The airfields around Chengdu were well within range though. For this reason Chennault had asked for a fighter group to defend the airfields, and the Matterhorn plan had called for two. At the Sextant Conference the Combined Chiefs of Staff had decided to transfer two fighter groups from Italy.

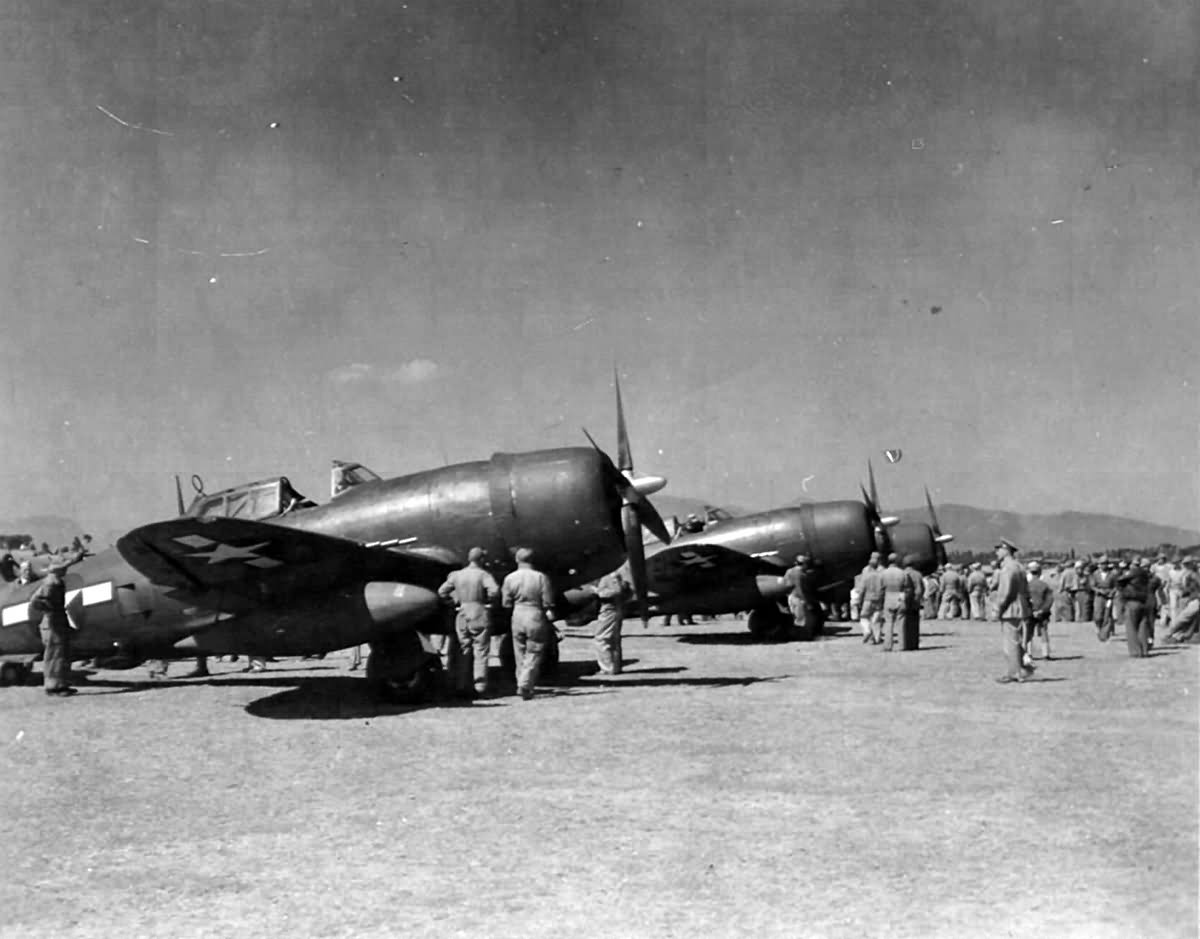
The first three P-47 Thunderbolts of the 33rd Fighter Group arrive in Kunming, China on 20 April 1944

The 33rd and 81st Fighter Groups were selected. To control the fighters, the Fourteenth Air Force activated the 312th Fighter Wing on 13 March, and Brigadier General Adlai H. Gilkeson assumed command twelve days later. Chennault recommended that the groups be equipped with North American P-51 Mustang fighters, but they had to be equipped with the less fuel efficient Republic P-47 Thunderbolt. Stratemeyer asked that the P-47s be sent from the United States, and the two groups conduct their conversion training in CBI.

If shipped normally, they would not arrive in Karachi before May, so the U.S. Navy made the escort carriers USS Mission Bay and Wake Island available to deliver the first hundred P-47s; the remaining fifty followed on freighters. The deployment of the two groups was delayed by their participation in the Battle of Anzio, but their flight echelons moved by air in mid-February, and the ground echelons moved by sea, embarking from Taranto, and arriving at Bombay on 20 March. The P-47s arrived at Karachi on 30 March, allowing conversion training to commence.

Stilwell was sufficiently concerned about the security of the Chengdu airfields to recommend that B-29 operations be postponed by a month. Permission for this was not forthcoming, so the 33rd Fighter Group's 59th Fighter Squadron was sent to Sichuan with its old P-40s. It provided Chengdu's sole air defense until May, when the rest of the 33rd Fighter Group, the 58th and 60th Fighter Squadrons, arrived with their P-47s. The 81st Fighter Group's 92nd Fighter Squadron deployed to Guanghan on 15 May, but the 91st and 93rd Fighter Squadrons did not join it until July. In the event, the Japanese response was not as intense as had been feared, and the late deployment of the fighters eased the burden of stocking fuel at Chengdu.

== Logistics ==
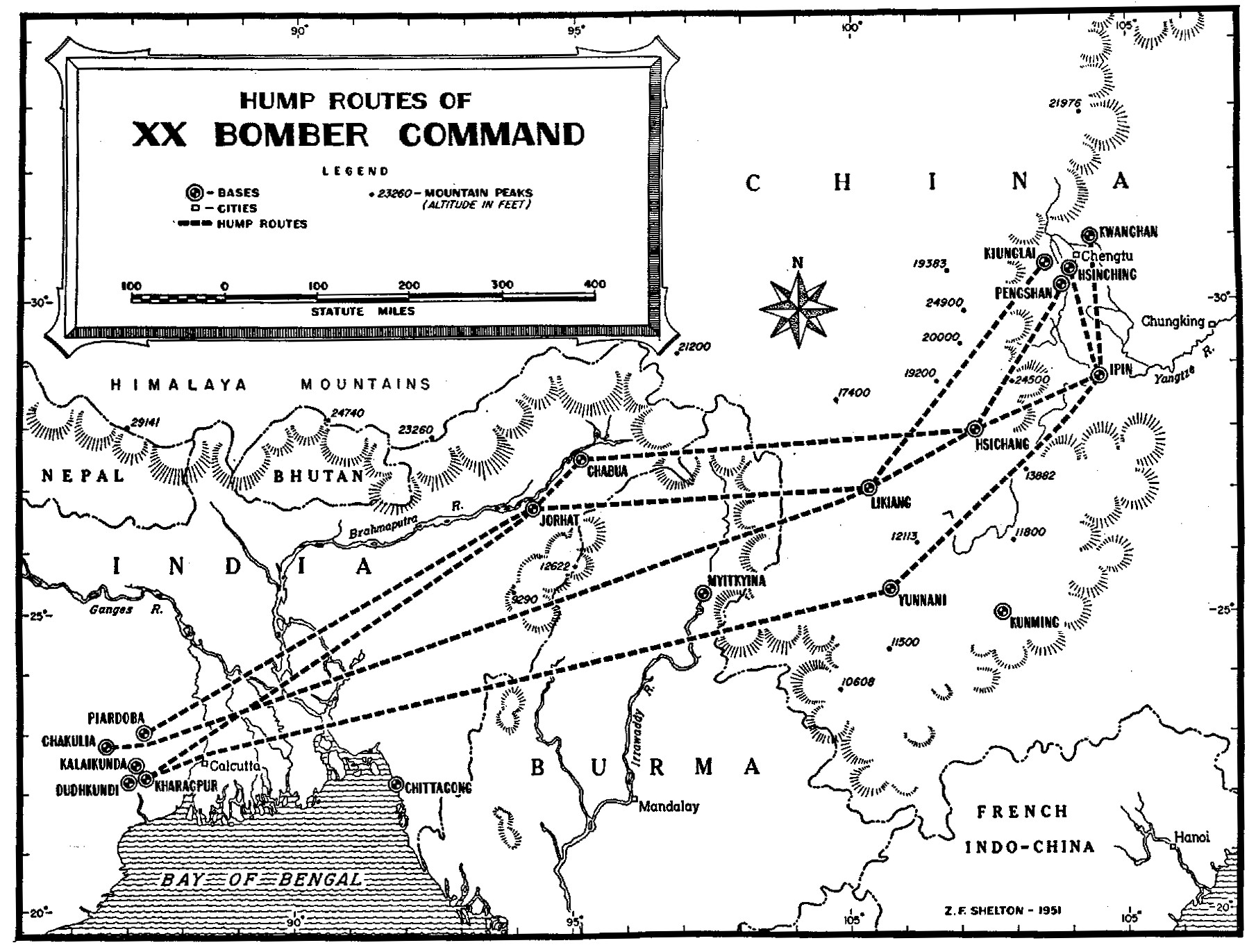
Hump routes of the XX Bomber Command

The XX Bomber Command was well-situated in India, enjoying good road and rail communications with the port of Calcutta, the 28th Air Depot at Barrackpore, the ATC terminus in Assam, and the Air Service Command installations at Alipore. Supplies moved from the port at Calcutta to Assam by rail and barge, from whence they had to be flown across the Hump. Although a key feature of the Matterhorn plan was that the XX Bomber Command would support itself, this was impractical, and it had to fall back on the services of Brigadier General Thomas O. Hardin's India–China Wing (ICW) of the ATC. This generated friction with the Fourteenth Air Force, which saw the XX Bomber Command as an interloping freeloader.

Twenty C-87s that the XX Bomber Command brought with it had been flown out by ATC pilots on 90-days' temporary duty. One was lost en route, and the rest were turned over to the ATC. The ICW promised that the XX Bomber Command would receive 1,650 tons out of the first 10,250 short tons (9,300 t) flown over the Hump in February, plus half of the next 1,250 short tons (1,130 t). The ATC exceeded its target, and delivered 12,950 short tons (11,750 t), but the XX Bomber Command received just 400 short tons (360 t).

March was a difficult month for the ICW, with a gasoline shortage in Assam and the opening of the Battle of Imphal and operations in Northern Burma and Western Yunnan, which caused ATC aircraft and supplies intended for Matterhorn to be diverted to support the ground forces. The first two B-29s flew across the Hump with gasoline on 26 April, and delivered enough gasoline for one B-29 combat sortie. Wolfe calculated that he needed 4,600 short tons (4,200 t) to support two 100-bomber raids on Japan.

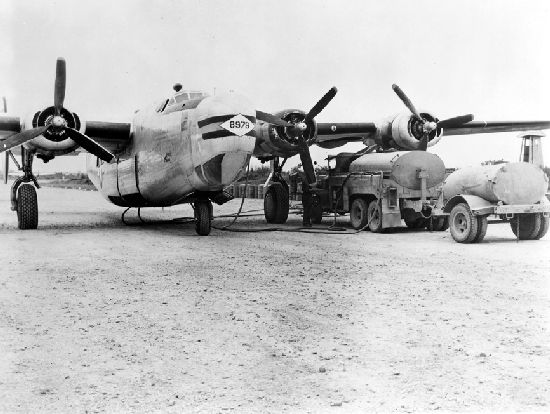
A C-109 Liberator Express tanker of the 2nd Air Transport Squadron unloads fuel in China in 1945.

Wolfe had some B-29s converted to tankers by stripping them of combat equipment except for the tail guns. In this configuration, a B-29 could carry seven tons of fuel instead of three. On 26 May, the Japanese launched an offensive in China, and Stilwell diverted Hump tonnage earmarked for Matterhorn to the Fourteenth Air Force. The Hump was dangerous, with high mountains and variable weather. Flights were counted as combat missions for the purpose of crew rotation. Twelve B-29s were lost over the Hump by the end of July, largely due to engine failures, but most of the crews were rescued by friendly Chinese civilians.

Lieutenant Colonel Robert S. McNamara's statistical section of the XX Bomber Command conducted a detailed investigation of the factors involved in the delivery of supplies to China. He managed to reduce gasoline consumption on a B-29 round trip to China and increase the fuel delivered. Part of this was accomplished by flying a more southerly and direct route, although this brought the B-29s within range of Japanese fighters based in northern Burma. Seventy C-109s were added to the effort to supply the XX Bomber Command in September, flown by surplus B-29 crews, and in November 1944 the B-29s were withdrawn from the airlift entirely and the C-109s were transferred to ATC.

== Offensive against Japanese petroleum and steel industries ==
=== Bangkok ===
By 19 May the XX Bomber Command had accumulated 2,867 flying hours in B-29s, of which 2,378 were on transport missions and 50 on miscellaneous tasks. Only 439 had been devoted to training activities. Since there were 240 crews, this worked out to less than two hours each. Before attempting a raid on Japan, Wolfe decided to conduct a shakedown combat mission. The chosen target was the Makkasan railway yard facilities in Bangkok, Thailand. This was the only heavy locomotive and railway car repair shop on the Burma-Thailand railway network. A successful attack could affect the supply lines of Japanese troops fighting around Imphal and Myitkyina. Intelligence indicated that the likely Japanese anti-aircraft and fighter opposition would not be as great as that anticipated over Japan. The decisive factor in the choice of target, though, was that it could be attacked from the airfields in Bengal and would not affect the supplies stockpiled in Chengdu.

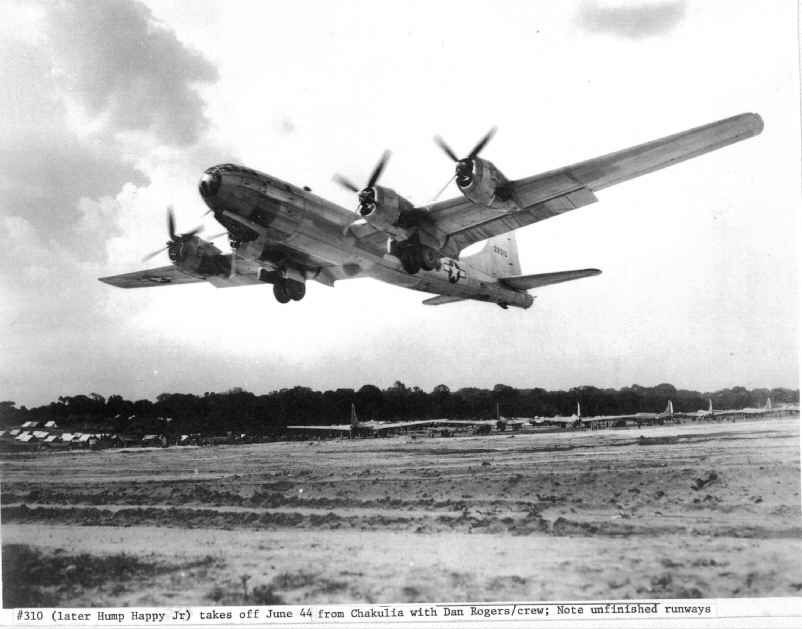
B-29 Superfortress 42-6310 (later named Hump Happy Jr.) of the 40th Bombardment Group takes off from Chakulia on the mission to Bangkok on 5 June 1944.

The mission involved a round trip of 2,261 miles (3,639 km). Each bomber carried a fuel load of 6,846 US gallons (25,910 L) and 5 short tons (4.5 t) of bombs; three groups carried 500-pound (230 kg) general-purpose bombs while the fourth carried M18 incendiary bombs. The XX Bomber Command wanted to test out the new M18 incendiary bombs and the large number of wooden buildings and freight cars and a small oil facility in the area offered good targets. The resulting 134,000-pound (61,000 kg) takeoff weight was too heavy for the temporary field at Charra, so the 444th Bombardment Group had to stage from the other three fields. The attack was launched at 05:45 (local time) on 5 June 1944 to avoid high ground temperatures that were bad for the R-3350 engines and to allow the whole mission to be conducted in daylight. Wolfe had suggested a night-time raid, but Arnold insisted on daylight precision bombing.

Of the 112 bombers that were readied for the mission, 98 took off from India. It took sixty-three minutes to get them all in the air. Most of the bombers that failed to take off had ignition or supercharger problems. One plane crashed shortly after takeoff when an engine lost power, killing all on board except the co-pilot. Thirteen planes aborted. Twelve aborted due to mechanical failures, most of which involved oil leaks or faults with the oil coolers. One plane failed to find its formation as a tropical cyclone rolled in over the Bay of Bengal; several others joined formations of groups other than their own, and some proceeded on their own.

Seventy-seven planes found the target. Seven planes reached Bangkok but were unable to bomb due to mechanical problems. Six had problems with their bomb bays. A chaotic series of bombing runs were made between 10:52 and 12:32. Because the target was obscured by clouds, forty-eight planes bombed by radar, although most crews had not been instructed in this technique. Japanese anti-aircraft fire was inaccurate, and although nine fighters attacked the bombers, their attacks were not pressed, and no B-29s were shot down. Four planes were lost on the return trip; two ditched into the Bay of Bengal after fuel ran out due to problems with the fuel transfer system; one crashed attempting to land at Dum Dum airfield; and one diverted to Kunming, China, but ran out of fuel and the crew had to bail out.

The mission to Bangkok resulted in the loss of five B-29s and the deaths of fifteen aircrew, with two more missing. Photo reconnaissance on 8 June indicated that sixteen or eighteen bombs had fallen within the target area. There was some damage to rolling stock and buildings, including the erecting and boiler shops. It was assessed that the damage would have no impact on the Japanese forces in Burma. The XX Bomber Command rated the mission as a success.

=== Yawata ===
The following day, Wolfe received orders from Arnold for an attack on Japan with at least 70 B-29s on 15 June, to coincide with the invasion of the Marianas. Drastic economies were applied, which particularly affected the 312th Fighter Wing, which was left with very little fuel. Wolfe calculated that he would have enough fuel for a raid, but not enough for all the B-29s to return to India immediately afterwards. A particular problem was that only 86 Superfortreses could be equipped with the bomb bay tanks needed for the flight to Japan. The B-29s began staging to China on 13 June. Each carried a full bomb load of eight 500-pound (230 kg) general purpose bombs, so only refueling was required in China. Of the 92 Superfortresses that departed, 79 made it to Chengdu. One plane went missing en route to Chengdu from India, and the crew was never found.

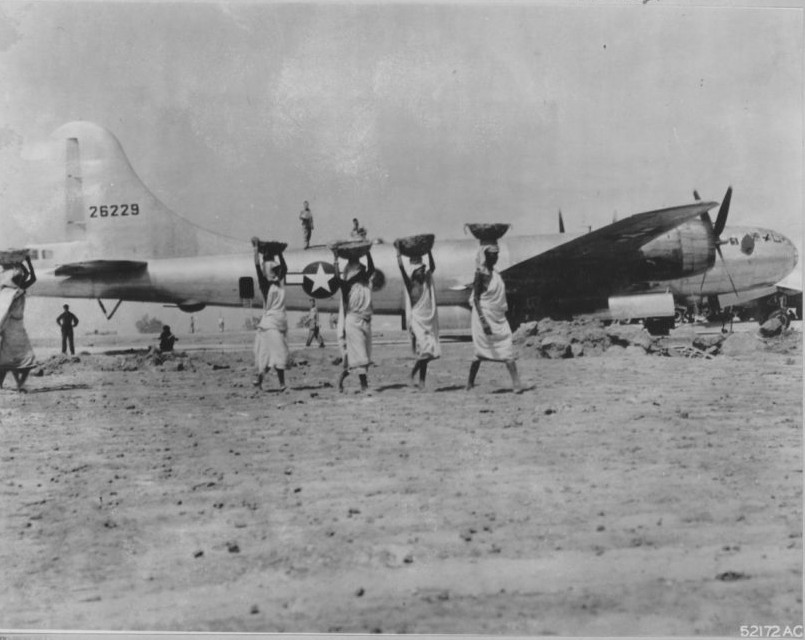
Indian women cart away dirt and stones in baskets balanced on their heads during the construction of a base in India. Superfortress 42-6229 (background), piloted by Captain Richard Hughes, crashed on takeoff during the Yawata mission.

The target chosen for the mission was the Imperial Iron and Steel Works in Yawata, which produced an estimated 2,250,000 metric tons of steel annually, representing 24 percent of Japan's steel output. This production was dependent on three coke plants, the largest of which, with an annual production of 1,784,000 metric tons, was designated the aiming point for the raid. It was a 3,182-mile (5,121 km) round trip from Chengdu to Yawata. In the belief that the B-29 lacked the range to fly there in a combat formation, Arnold authorized a night attack, with the planes bombing individually by radar.

The raid on Yawata was the first on the Japanese home islands since the Doolittle Raid of April 1942 and marked the beginning of the strategic bombardment campaign against Japan. Eight journalists and three news photographers accompanied the mission, which was led by Saunders, who, along with Engler, flew as a passenger on B-29 Superfortress 42-6274 Lady Hamilton of the 468th Bombardment Group, piloted by Captain Herman Sancken.

Takeoffs for the mission began on 16 June at 16:16 local time. One plane crashed on takeoff but the crew escaped. Not so lucky were the crew of another which was launched after the main group to conduct post-attack photography that also crashed on takeoff; 11 of the 12-man crew died. Four planes aborted the mission and returned to Chengdu. Only forty-seven of the sixty-eight B–29s launched hit the target area: one crashed en route after hitting a cliff while attempting to abort the raid, six jettisoned their bombs because of mechanical difficulties, and seven bombed secondary targets or targets of opportunity. Six bombers suffered minor damage from flak, and one was lost over Yawata, 42-6230 Limber Dragon, which was shot down by a Kawasaki Ki-45 night fighter piloted by Warrant Officer Sadamitsu Kimura. The 12 men on board, including Newsweek correspondent William T. Shenkel, were killed. One Japanese fighter reported minor damage.

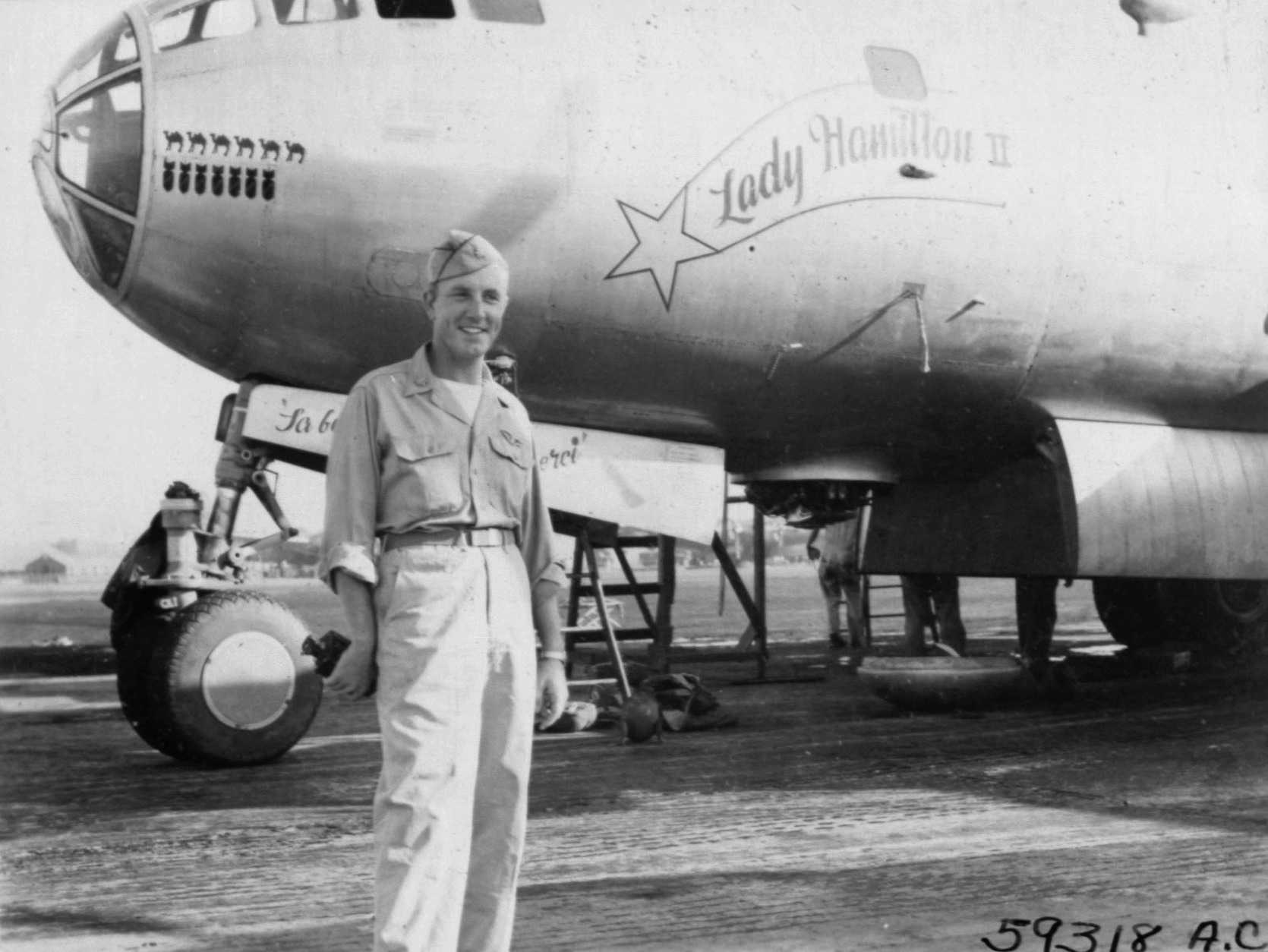
Captain Herman H. Sancken of Augusta, Georgia, pilot of the Superfortress 42-24542 Lady Hamilton II (background)

On the way back to Chengdu, B-29 Superfortresses 42-6231 and 42-93826 crashed into a mountainsides north of Chegdu with the loss of all on board. Another, B-29 42-6293, with Time-Life photographer Harry Zinder on board, has to make an emergency landing on the grass airstrip at Neixiang. The crew escaped unscathed, and eventually made it back to Chengdu, but their B-29 was strafed and destroyed by Japanese aircraft. To get his B-29s back to India, Wolfe had to borrow 15,000 US gallons (57,000 L) from the 312th Fighter Wing's meager supply. Although the B-29s sat on the ground at Chengdu unprotected for several days afterwards, there were no Japanese attacks on the bases at Chengdu.

The raid on Yawata cost seven B-29s and 56 crewmen and a war correspondent. Photos of the target were taken by the Fourteenth Air Force on 8 June, which indicated that only one bomb had landed in the target area, striking a power house 3,700 feet (1,100 m) from the coke ovens. Press releases were factual and downplayed the damage inflicted. The existence of the Twentieth Air Force and XX Bomber Command were disclosed for the first time.

=== Sasebo ===
Arnold ordered a small fifteen-plane follow-up raid on Japan by 10 July to demonstrate that Yawata was the start of a bombing campaign and not a one-off like the Doolittle raid, followed by a hundred-plane attack on Manchuria by 30 July and a fifty-plane attack on Palembang as soon as the airfields in Ceylon were ready. Wolfe's response was a counterproposal, scaling back the size of the forces to be engaged. Arnold relieved Wolfe of his command on 4 July and promoted him to major general, assigning him to the Air Materiel Command, where his engineering experience was put to use expediting improvements to the B-29 and increasing its rate of production. His transfer "had something of the appearance of a kick upstairs". Saunders assumed temporary command until Wolfe's relief, Major General Curtis E. LeMay, could arrive.

The first of the requested missions was flown on the night of 7 July. The mission plan called for attacks on five targets on Kyushu: eighteen bombers would attack the Sasebo Naval Base; three would bomb the Akunoura engine works in Nagasaki; two would raid the nearby Omura aircraft plant; and one-plane strikes would be conducted against the steel works at Yawata and Tobata. That the likely damage would be negligible was not overlooked, but it was felt that this would be outweighed by the psychological factor. Putting 25 B-29s over Japan required 203 Hump missions and ate into the stockpile required for the hundred-plane mission to Manchuria.

Of the 28 B-29s despatched from India, two had to turn back with mechanical trouble. One plane caught fire on the ground at Chakulia and was a total loss. Seventeen planes took off from Chengdu, along with two reconnaissance aircraft detailed to photograph the Miike Dyestuffs Plant in Omuta. Eleven bombed Sasebo using radar, as cloud cover obscured the target. No planes were lost to flak or fighters over Japan. The conditions did not allow for any damage assessment.

=== Anshan I ===
With 3,954 short tons (3,587 t) of fuel, bombs and stores carried across the Hump in July, the availability of aircraft now became the major limiting factor on operations. With only 127 B-29s available after some had been converted to tankers, Sanders was hard pressed to meet Arnold's desire for a 100-plane strike. To gather as many aircraft as possible, he pushed back the date for the operation to the end of July. This meant postponing Palembang until August, but the airfields on Ceylon were not yet ready in any case. By allocating five days for the deployment to China, aircraft that were forced to turn back could be repaired and sent out again, and additional maintenance could be performed in China. The procedure entailed some risk because the B-29s could become targets for Japanese attacks while sitting on the ground at Chengdu for up to five days.

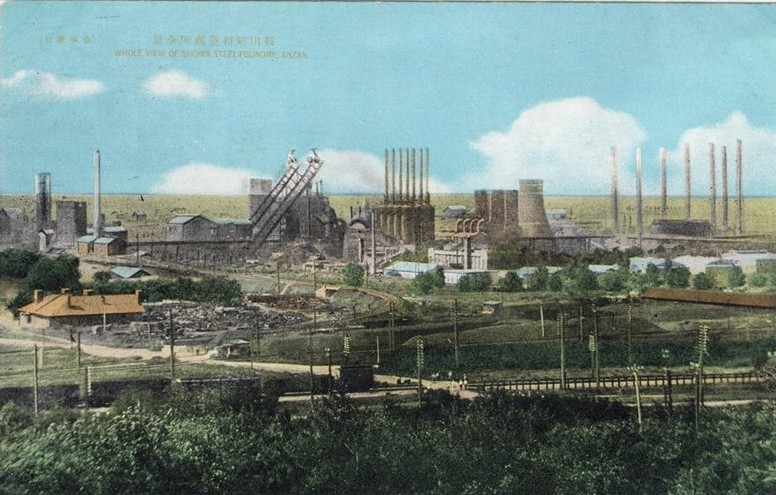
Pre-war photograph of the Showa Steel works

The B-29s began making the trip to China on 25 July, and only four of the 111 despatched failed to reach China. One aircraft's engine caught on fire after takeoff for Chakulia, and it crash landed near Midnapore; nine of the thirteen crew died. The mission was launched on 29 July. The target was the Showa Steel Works in Anshan, an important producer of coke, pig iron and steel. It produced 3,793,000 metric tons of coke annually, about a third of the Japanese Empire's total. The 444th Bombardment Group's base at Guanghan Airfield was rendered unserviceable by heavy rains, but 79 B-29s from the other three groups were available, and all but seven were able to take off. One crashed shortly afterwards when two engines caught fire.

Eleven aircraft developed mechanical trouble, and did not reach the target. One bombed the secondary target, the port of Qinhuangdao, two bombed the target of last resort, rail yards at Zhengxian, four attacked targets of opportunity, and four returned without bombing at all. Sixty attacked the Showa Steel Works, flying in close formation. A bomb hit a byproducts plant near the target, resulting in a cloud of dark smoke.

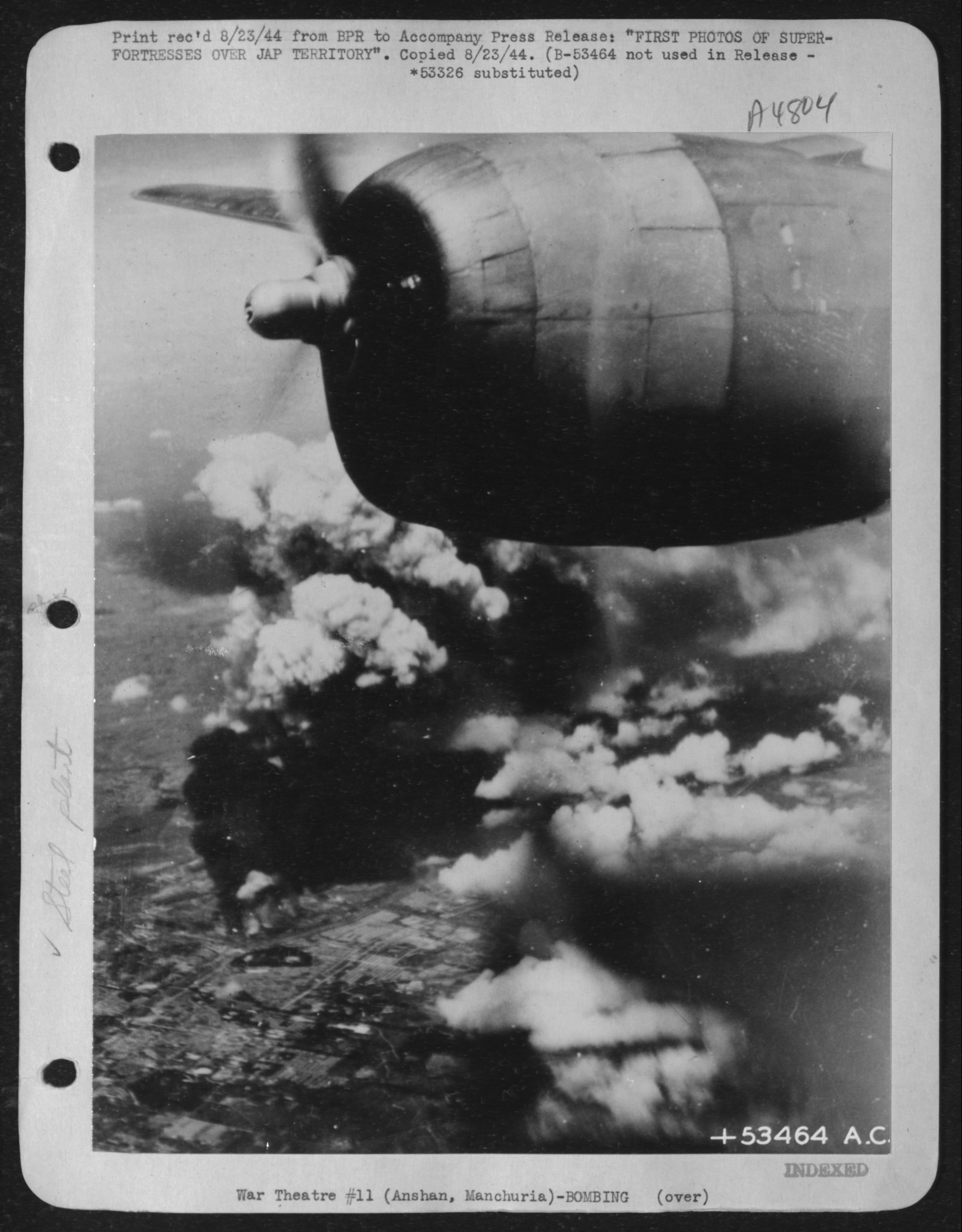
Great clouds of smoke rising from the Showa Steel Works during the daylight raid on Anshan, Manchuria.

Flak damaged five bombers. One, B-29 Superfortress 42-6274 Lady Hamilton, was shot down by fighters. Eight of the crew bailed out and eventually reached Chengdu with the aid of Chinese guerrillas. Another made an emergency landing at Ankang. The Japanese attempted to destroy it on the ground while it sat there for five days, resulting in the loss of a Kawasaki Ki-48 bomber during a night raid to Fourteenth Air Force fighters. Tools, spare parts and mechanics were flown in by C-46s, and the B-29 was repaired and took to the sky again on 3 August. Flak damaged one of the engines of B-29 Superfortress 42-6256 Ramp Tramp, so it made an emergency landing in Vladivostok. The crew were interned in the Soviet Union, but were permitted to escape to Iran, along with the crews of three other B-29s that landed in the Soviet Union. The Soviets later reverse engineered the B-29 to produce the Tupolev Tu-4.

The ground at Guanghan dried out, allowing twenty-four B-29s of the 444th Bombardment Group to take to the air. It was five hours too late to participate in the attack on Anshan, so they headed for the tertiary target, the port of Taku. Five planes turned back with mechanical trouble, sixteen planes bombed Taku, and three attacked Zhengxian. The mission was assessed as a success. At a cost of five B-29s, there were direct hits on two of the sixteen coke oven batteries and damage to a third, which was estimated would take a year to repair. At Taku two large warehouses and a collier were damaged.

=== Palembang ===
The Pladjoe refinery at Palembang was the source of 22 percent of Japan's fuel oil for ships and industrial facilities, and 78 percent of its aviation gasoline, and was therefore a major target for the B-29s. Arnold wanted a 112-plane raid, but with only the airfield at China Bay available, a 50-plane raid was the best that Saunders could do. The mission was the longest flown from CBI. It had two targets: in addition to the attack on the refinery, fourteen B-29s of the 462nd Bombardment Group were detailed to drop Mark 26 1,000-pound (450 kg) aerial mines in the Moesi River. This was the first use of aerial mines by the Twentieth Air Force. This mission involved a flight of 3,855 miles (6,204 km) to Palembang and 4,030 miles (6,490 km) to the Moesi River, so maximum fuel loads were carried, which meant only one short ton (0.91 t) of bombs or mines could be carried.

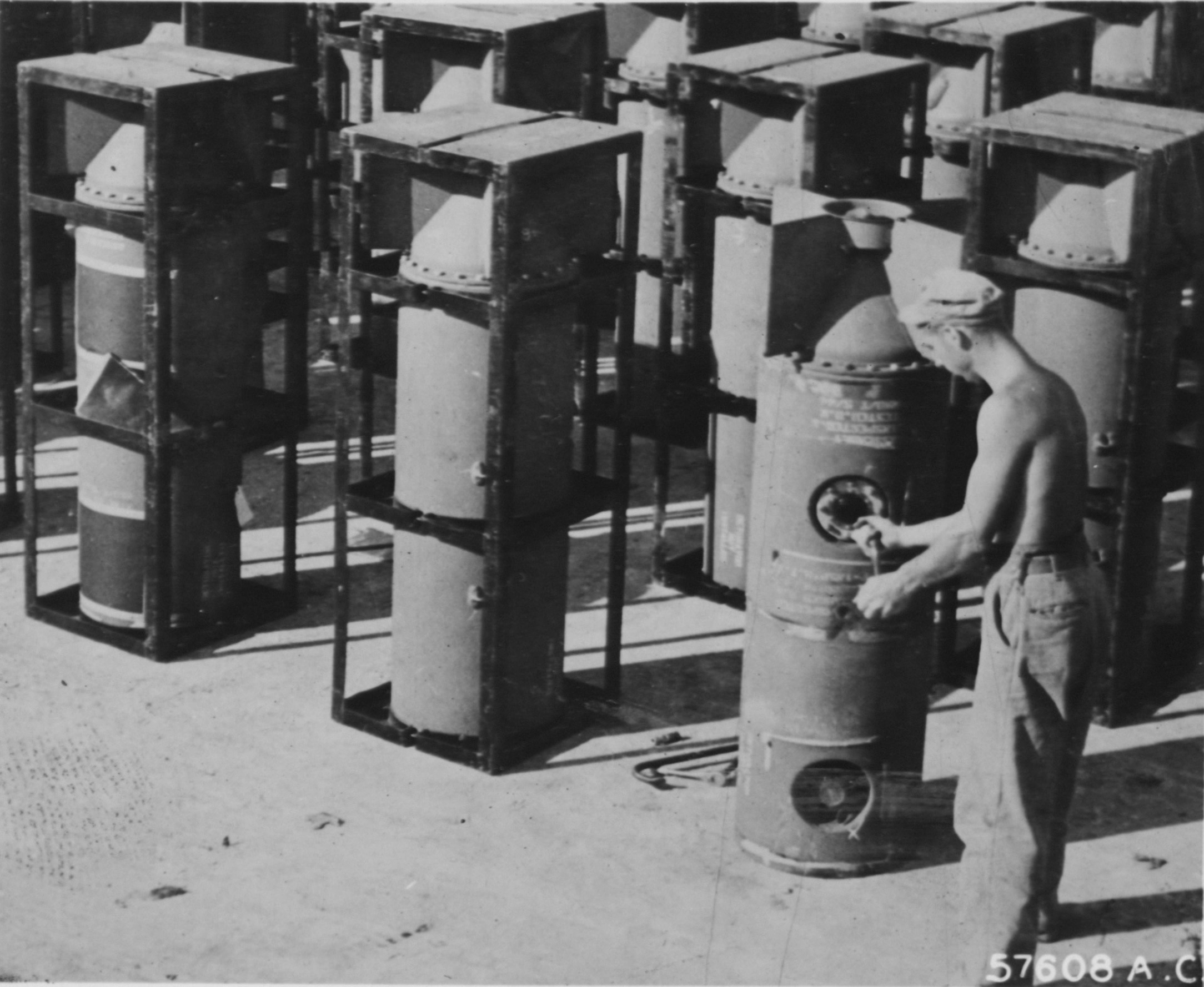
Preparing aerial mines for the Palembang mission

Fifty-six B-29s of the 444th and 468th Bombardment Groups arrived at China Bay on the afternoon of 9 August. The strike force began to take off from China Bay at 16:45 the next day. A total of 54 B-29s were dispatched. One of the aircraft returned to the base 40 minutes after taking off due to engine problems, it was repaired within two hours, and took off again bound for Sumatra. Eight aircraft returned to Ceylon with mechanical trouble, and six more did not bomb the primary target. Thirty-nine bombers reached their primary targets. Thirty-one attacked the refinery. The B-29 assigned to drop illumination flares did not make it, so bombing was at night through overcast. A photo reconnaissance mission could not be flown until 19 September, which made it difficult to assess the results, but it appeared that only one building had been destroyed.

Carmichael personally led the 462nd Bombardment Group's mining mission. Eight bombers carried out the mission, laying sixteen aerial mines. Mines dropped in the river connecting Palembang to the sea sank three ships totalling 1,768 deadweight tons (1,796 deadweight tonnes) and damaged four ships of 6,560 deadweight tons (6,670 deadweight tonnes). It took the Japanese almost a month to sweep the mines and open the river for maritime traffic again, which held up petroleum exports. The Japanese fighters and antiaircraft guns failed to destroy any of the American bombers, but B-29 Superfortress 42-24420 of the 444th Bombardment Group ditched when it ran out of fuel 90 miles (140 km) from Ceylon. One crewman died, but the rest were rescued on 12 August by the British destroyer HMS Redoubt, which homed in on their "Gibson Girl" beacon.

This was the only USAAF raid on the oil facilities at Palembang. No more B-29 missions were flown from Ceylon. On 24 August, the XX Bomber Command recommended that the base at China Bay be abandoned, and Twentieth Air Force concurred on 3 October.

=== Nagasaki ===
Only using fifty-six B-29s against Palembang left aircraft available for use elsewhere. Saunders therefore proposed a small raid on Japan. It was hoped that striking on the same day as Palembang would have a psychological impact by demonstrating that the B-29s could simultaneously attack targets thousands of miles apart. Saunders chose Nagasaki as the target, as it was an important shipbuilding, steel and munitions production area. He proposed to attack at night with incendiaries. This was the first incendiary raid on Japan.

Thirty-three B-29s from all four groups took off from India. One had to turn back with mechanical problems, another caught fire and the crew had to bail out over India. Twenty-nine bombers took off for Nagasaki. Each B-29 carried thirteen M-18 incendiary clusters and three M-26 fragmentation clusters, a total load of 5,816 pounds (2,638 kg). Two bombers from the 40th Bombardment Group had to return early, one with an oil leak and one with radar problems. Twenty-six B-29s attacked the target. The damage inflicted was minimal. The first trial of firebombing was a failure.

No B-29s were lost over the target and one downed a Japanese fighter, the Twentieth Air Force's first confirmed kill. Two B-29s ran out of fuel. The crew of Superfortress 42-6243 Roger the Lodger, bailed out over Huaning; all eventually returned safely. The other, Superfortress 42-6359 Missouri Queen, landed at a forward airfield where it sank into the mud. The 312th Fighter Wing provided air cover and mechanics were flown in. The Chinese jacked the plane up and laid 4,500 railroad ties. Mechanics and the crew stripped the aircraft of non-essential equipment, and it was able to take off again on 23 August and land at Qionglai.

=== Yawata II ===
For the next mission, Saunders wanted to complete the destruction of the coke oven in Yawata. His staff debated whether the best course of action was daylight precision bombing or a night attack with incendiaries. In the end, it was decided to do both. One innovation was to allow the group commanders to set different loads for each B-29, based upon the efficiency of the aircraft and crew. On this mission some B-29s burned as little as 6,100 US gallons (23,000 L) and some as much as 7,600 US gallons (29,000 L), carrying an average of 6.3 500-pound (230 kg) bombs.

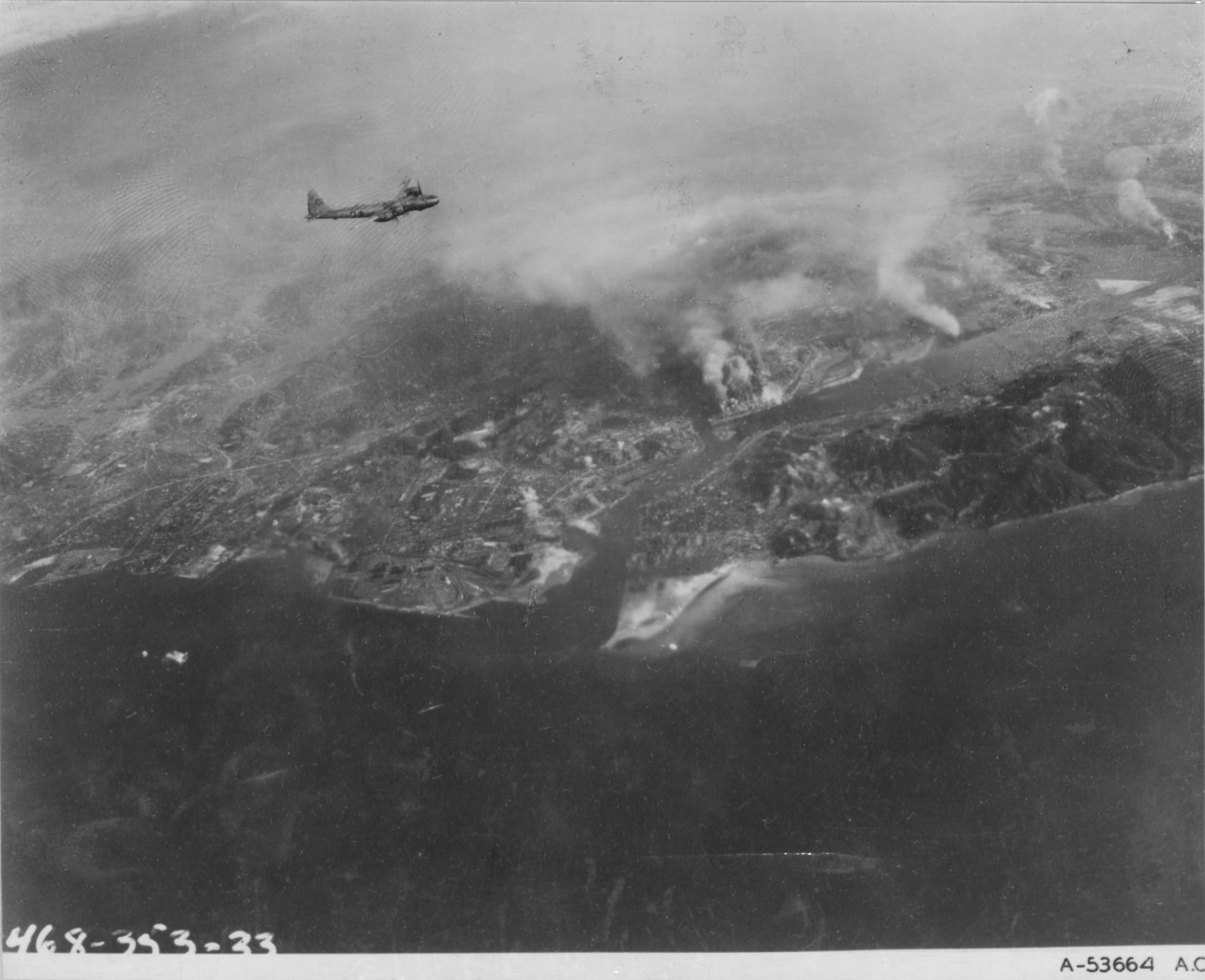
Bombing of Yawata

Three bombers had to return to India with mechanical trouble, two more had to land at a forward airbase en route, and one crashed; the crew bailed out and were recovered by Chinese civilians. The three bombers that returned to base and one of the ones that made a forced landing were repaired and were able to rejoin the others in China. Ninety-seven bombers were then available in China, and seventy-five took off on the daylight raid. The eighth aircraft of the 462nd Bombardment Group to take off from Qionglai crashed when its landing gear failed on takeoff, blocking the runway for the remaining thirteen aircraft. Strong winds prevented takeoff in the opposite direction, and it took six hours to clear the runway. It was therefore decided to mount a night mission. Eight of the thirteen remaining bombers were able to launch on this mission. They were joined by five bombers from the 40th and 444th Bombardment Groups that had failed to take off on the daylight raid, and one that had returned with mechanical trouble but had been repaired.

Sixty-one of the seventy-five bombers on the daylight raid found the target. They were met by intense flak from up to 166 anti-aircraft guns. Eight bombers were damaged and one, B-29 Superfortress 42-6408 Reddy Teddy of the 468th Bombardment Group, was shot down over Japan. Another, B-29 Superfortress 42-6308 Feather Merchant of the 40th Bombardment Group, was damaged by flak and fighters; all but two of the crew bailed out over friendly territory in China and were rescued by Chinese civilians. B-29 Superfortress 42-24474 Starduster of the 462nd Bombardment Group, piloted by Carmichael, was damaged by a Japanese Ki-45 fighter and crashed on Iki Island. Nine of the ten crew bailed out, but one man's parachute did not open and another was machine gunned in the air. The remaining seven, including Carmichael, were captured and endured beatings and mistreatment in captivity.

B-29 Superfortress 42-93829 Cait Paomat received flak damage over Yawata and the pilot, Major Richard McGlinn, elected to bail out over the Soviet Union rather than Japanese-occupied China. The crew of eleven became the second B-29 crew interned in the Soviet Union. That night ten more B-29s dropped bombs on Yawata. The damage assessment was dispiriting; two coke ovens had been hit. Four B-29s had been shot down and ten lost to other causes, and ninety-five aircrew were dead or missing.

=== Anshan II and III ===
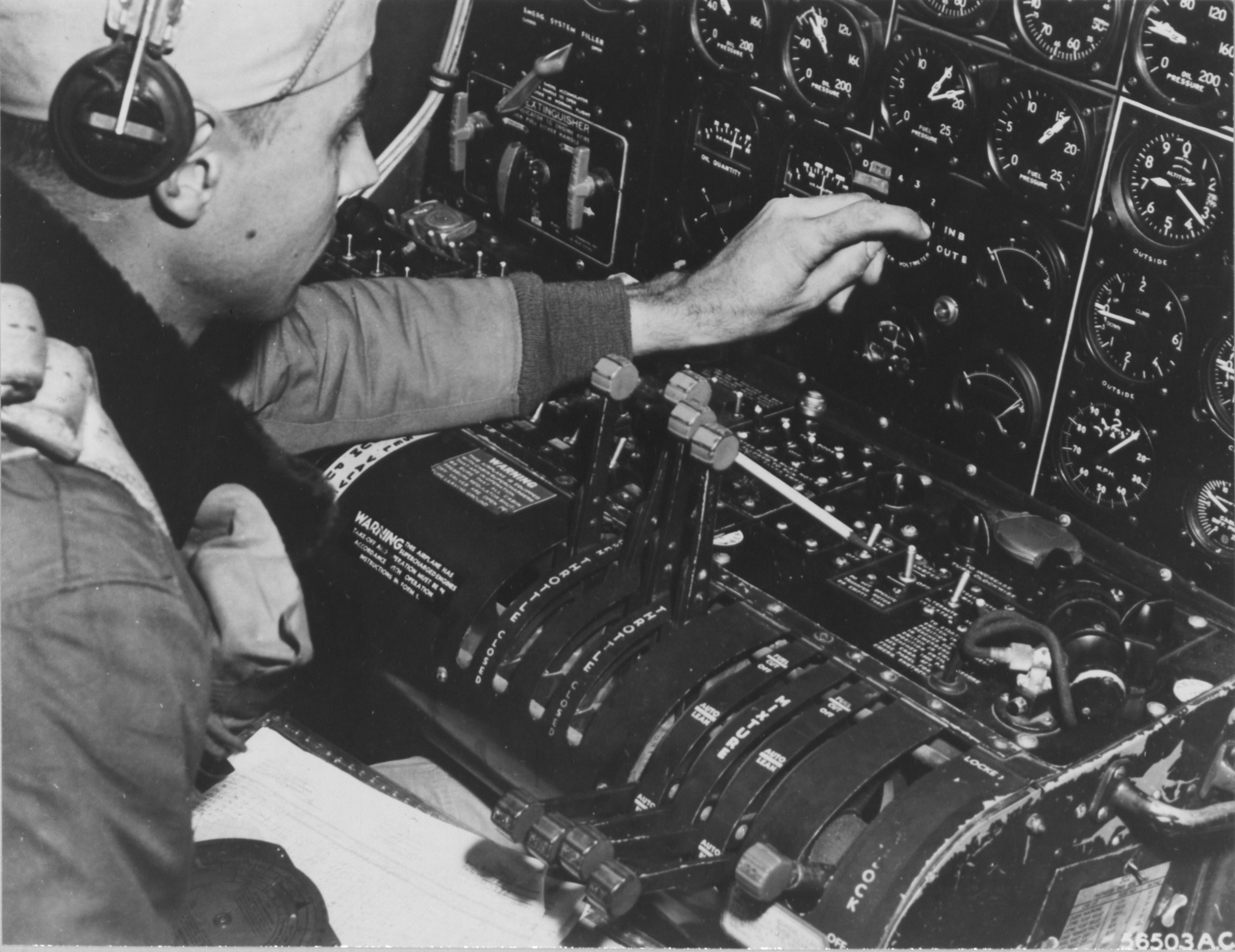
Master Sergeant Harry Miller at the engineer's instrument panel on Superfortress 42-6281 20th Century Unlimited during the bombing raid on Anshan, Manchuria. Miller was killed in the raid on Omura on 25 October 1944.

LeMay arrived on 20 August. He received special permission from Arnold to fly one combat mission in order to see for himself the nature of the challenges his crews faced. The mission was to Anshan again on 8 September; Arnold wanted the coke ovens put out of action. One hundred and eight of the 116 B-29s deployed to China for the raid took off and 95 of them found the target. LeMay flew on Superfortress 42-24503 Nippon Nipper II, one of five B-29s damaged by flak. Superfortress 42-6234 My Assam Dragon of the 444th Bombardment Group was shot down by Japanese fighters. Seven crew members bailed out and landed near the coast of the Bohai Sea in Changli County, where they were rescued by the local civilians. Communist troops escorted them on a 1,500-mile (2,400 km) journey by foot to Yan'an in Shanxi Province, where they were met by Mao Zedong. They reached the 444th Bombardment Group's base at Guanghan Airfield on 23 January 1945.

The raid was credited with destroying two more of the coke batteries. Based on aerial photography, intelligence estimated that the two raids on Anshan had put three of the sixteen batteries out of action for at least a year, and three more for at least six months, resulting in production dropping by a third. Afterwards, LeMay stood the XX Bomber Command down for retraining while the bases in China were restocked. He introduced a series of changes to bombing, navigation and aircraft maintenance based on his experiences with the Eighth Air Force in Europe. He discarded the four-aircraft diamond formation then in use and instituted the combat box. The larger formation gave greater protection against fighters. He established a lead crew system where each group selected six lead crews. In the lead crews, the navigator would lead the entire formation and the bombardier (or radar operator in bad weather) of the lead crew would decide when to release the bombs of the whole group. When it worked, this system was superior to attacking in diamonds or individually; when it did not, all the bombs missed the target.

Twelve-plane combat box formation.

LeMay realised that the weather over Japan was even more uncertain than that over Europe. Even in the best month of the year, there was on average only seven days of fine weather that permitted visual bombing; in the worst month, there was just one. Accurate forecasting required weather stations on the Asian mainland, so LeMay sent a team to negotiate with Mao, who controlled part of northern China. Mao agreed to assist downed American airmen and to allow the Americans to establish a weather station at his headquarters. Mao offered to allow the Americans to build airstrips for the B-29s, but LeMay had to decline the offer because it was difficult enough to supply the airfields around Chengdu.

The XX Bomber Command followed up the raid on Anshan with a third attack on 26 September, using the combat box formation for the first time. This time 109 bombers participated, of which 88 found the primary target. Nine formations of three to sixteen bombers attacked the target, as did one solo bomber in defiance of orders that individual attacks were only to be made on secondary targets. Visibility was poor due to cloud cover over the target. Eight bombers were damaged by flak and nine by Japanese fighters. Follow-up aerial photography did not reveal any additional damage to the coke ovens. Although no bombers were lost, the COA reconsidered whether the effort was worth it: the submarine campaign against Japanese shipping was having an impact on the Japanese economy, rendering steel production less important.

== Supporting the theater commanders ==
=== Omura and Formosa ===
On 11 October, LeMay received orders to discontinue the attacks on the petroleum and steel industries and concentrate on missions in support of the theater commanders such as shipping and aircraft and naval facilities. This ended Matterhorn as originally intended. The next raid was therefore targeted at the Okayama aircraft repair and assembly facility in Takao Prefecture in Formosa, in support of General Douglas MacArthur's upcoming return to the Philippines in conjunction with planes from the U.S. Navy's aircraft carriers. This time 130 bombers took off on the mission and 103 dropped 1,035 incendiaries and 1,519 high explosive bombs on the target area. Two aircraft were lost due to mechanical problems.

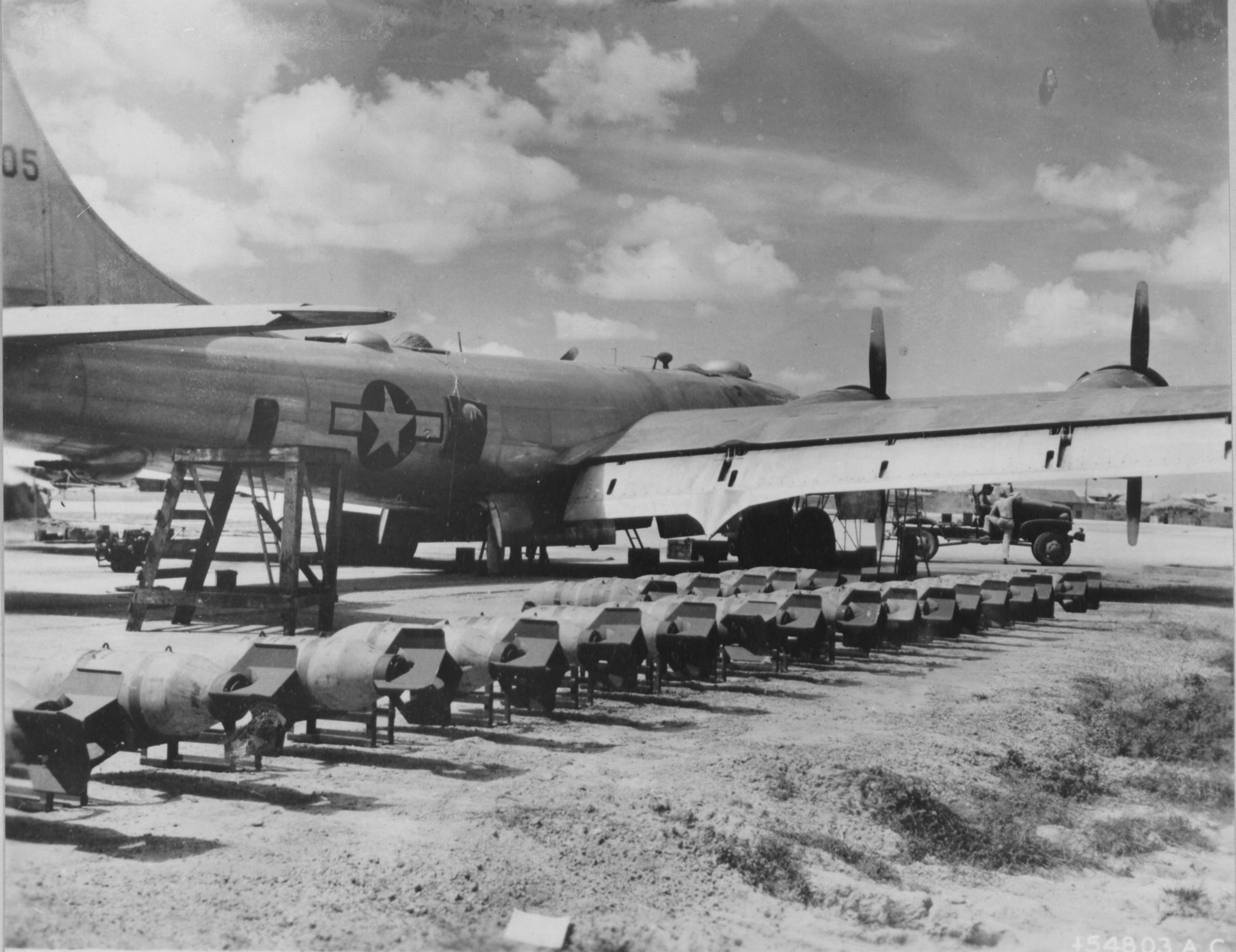
500-lb bombs are lined up to be loaded into a B-29 for a raid on Formosa

A second raid on Okayama was carried out two days later. The raids were very successful. Together with the U.S. Navy carrier aircraft, the bombers destroyed 74 of the 80 buildings in the facility and 69 aircraft there. The B-29s returned to Formosa on 17 October. This time, the target was the Einansho Aircraft Depot. Only ten of the twenty-three bombers found the target due to heavy cloud cover; the remaining thirteen bombed Takao harbor.

Still in support of the Philippines operations, the XX Bomber Command attacked the Japanese Omura aircraft assembly plant in Nagasaki on 25 October. This factory made Mitsubishi A6M Zeke, Aichi B7A Grace and Mitsubishi F1M Pete aircraft and aircraft engines. Of the 79 aircraft on the raid, 59 bombed the target, using radar as it was obscured by clouds. B-29 Superfortress 42-6281 20th Century Unlimited of the 40th Bombardment Group, piloted by Captain Jack C. Ledford, was shot down but managed to crash land in China. One crewman, flight engineer Master Sergeant Harry C. Miller died, but the rest were met by local civilians who helped them make their way back.

LeMay originally intended to stage a training mission on 4 October to hone his crews' skills in flying the new twelve-plane formations, but this had been postponed in favor of the attacks on Formosa. The training mission was finally flown on 3 November. The target was the Malegon Railway Yards in Rangoon, Burma, in support of the CBI theater. This was the primary Japanese rail yard in the area, holding up to five locomotives and three hundred rail cars at any given time. Forty-four of the forty-nine B-29s despatched found the target. Fourteen bombers were damaged by flak, and three more by other B-29s, but only one was lost; a fire forced it to ditch in the ocean, and the crew were rescued by a motor launch of the Royal Indian Navy. No results were observed.

Two days later, seventy-six B-29s set out to attack the Admiralty IX Floating Dry Dock and King George VI Graving Dock in Singapore. Fifty-six bombed the target; ten had to turn back with mechanical problems and two crashed en route. Seven aircraft attacked the secondary target, the Pangkalanbrandan oil refinery on Sumatra, which produced 19% of Japan's fuel oil. No results were observed from either target.

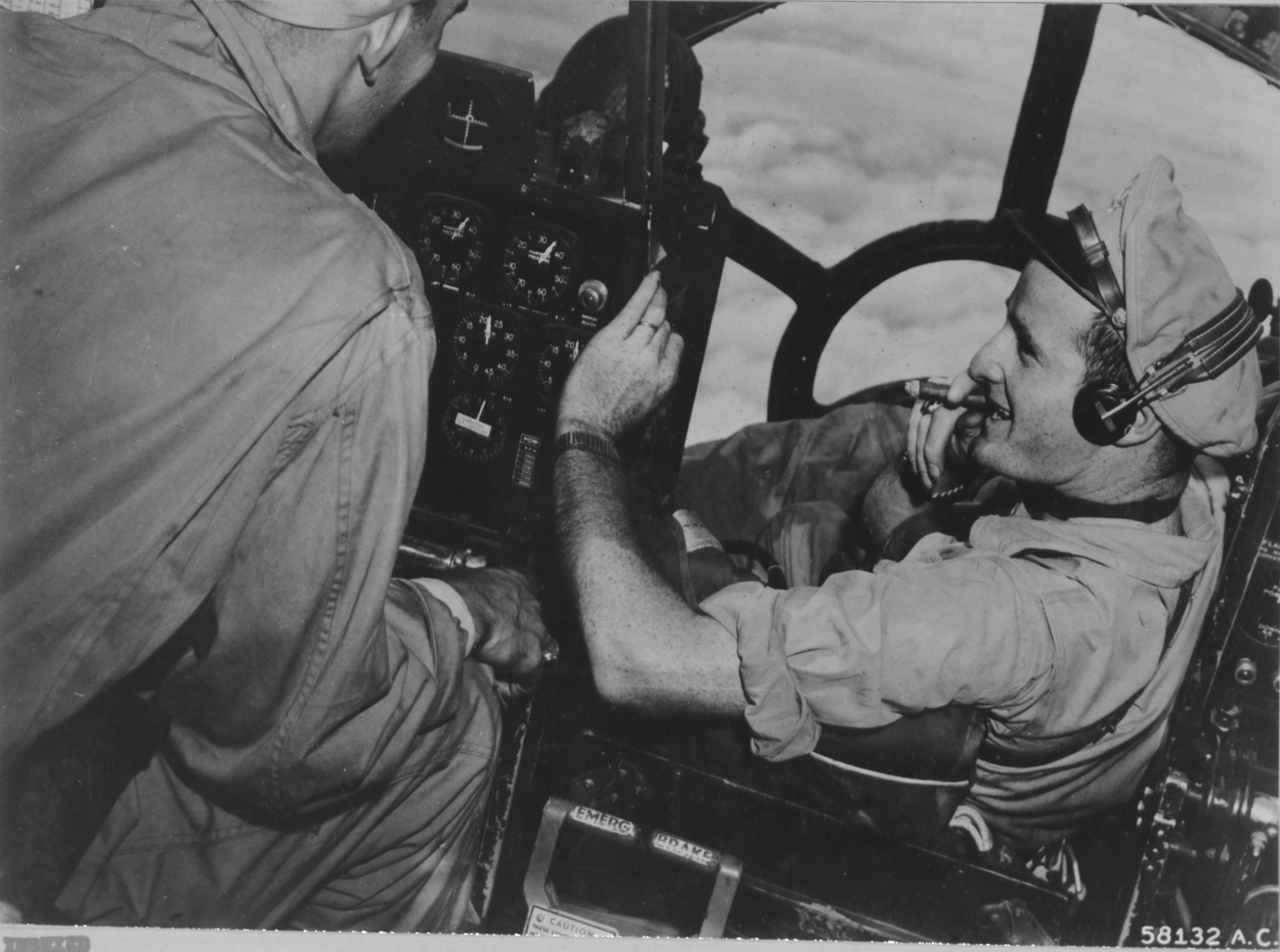
Captain Jack C. Ledford, pilot, and 2nd Lieutenant William L. Gardner, bombardier, of Boeing B-29 Superfortress, 42-6281 20th Century Unlimited.

On 11 November, the XX Bomber Command flew another mission to Omura. A typhoon had developed over Kyushu which the Weather Office did not discern until after the bombers had taken off. In response, LeMay altered the target to Nanjing, but not all the bombers received the message. As a result, twenty-nine of the ninety-six bombers attacked Omura. They were buffeted by high winds and only five planes attacked in formation. Five aircraft were lost. Superfortress 42-6365 General H. H. Arnold Special, the aircraft Arnold had personally signed, made an emergency landing in Vladivostok. Captain Weston H. Price and his crew became the third B-29 crew interned in the Soviet Union.

Ten days later, the XX Bomber Command repeated the raid on Omura. This time, 109 aircraft were launched. One B-29 crashed on takeoff; only the tail gunner survived. Sixty-one managed to find the target. Japanese fighter opposition was intense. In all, ten B-29s were lost on the mission, including Superfortress 42-6358 Ding How, piloted by First Lieutenant William Mickish, which diverted to Vladivostok. Mickish and his crew became the fourth B-29 crew to be interned in the Soviet Union. In retaliation, the Japanese staged a night attack on Chengdu; three B-29s and a C-109 were damaged, and a stock of drummed gasoline was ignited. One Japanese aircraft was shot down by a Northrop P-61 Black Widow of the 426th Night Fighter Squadron. Strike photographs showed bomb craters on the airfield but no damaged aircraft. Three American airmen captured by the Japanese were paraded through Hankow on 16 December, beaten and hanged. After the war, Major General Masataka Kaburagi and four of his subordinates were executed for this.

While fuel stocks in China were being replenished after the Omura missions, LeMay launched another raid on Bangkok on 27 November. This time the target was the Bang Sue Marshalling Yard. Sixty B-29s were launched, fifteen from each group, and fifty-five of them found the target. The skies were clear and results were good; the primary aiming points were destroyed, and nine locomotives and ninety rail cars were destroyed or damaged. One bomber, Superfortress 42-24454 Devil May Care, piloted by First Lieutenant Carl Blackwell, was damaged by a Royal Thai Air Force Nakajima Ki-43 Oscar flown by Flight Lieutenant Worrasap Therdsak. (Note: Thailand was a wartime ally of Japan.) Therdsak's fighter was damaged by B-29 gunfire, and he was forced to bail out. Although badly burned, he survived. Blackwell made for Chittagong airfield, but is believed to have crashed into the sea. No survivors or wreckage was found.

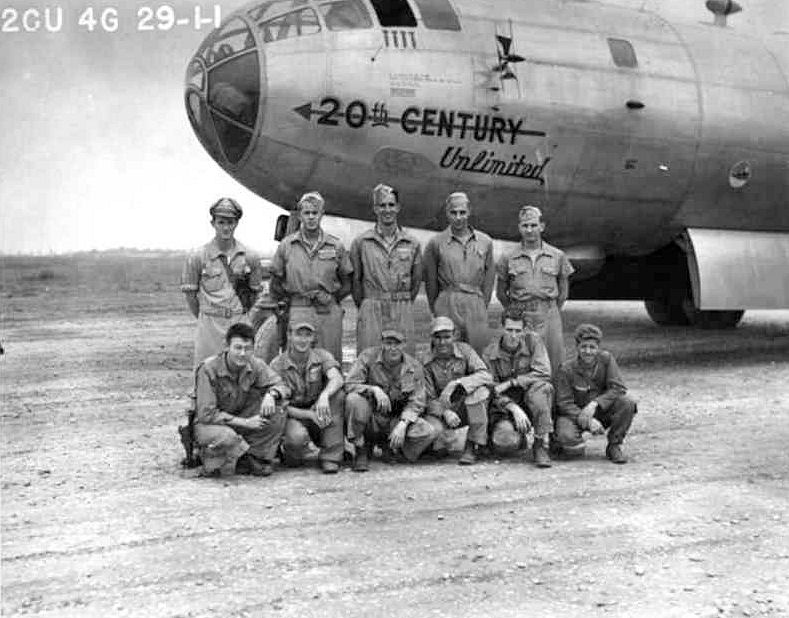
The crew of Boeing B-29 Superfortress 42-6281 20th Century Unlimited

LeMay planned a third mission to Omura, but at the last minute the target was switched to Mukden on account of forecasts of bad weather. The primary target was the Manchuria Airplane Manufacturing Company, which mainly assembled trainer aircraft. One hundred and eight B-29s set out on the mission from Chengdu on 7 December. Although the weather was fine, it was very cold and some B-29s had trouble with icing of their plexiglas wind screen. Only twenty-one bombers struck the primary target. Seven B-29s were lost: four in combat and three from mechanical failures. The crew of Superfortress 42-63363 Marietta Misfit, piloted by Captain George Varoff, were forced to bail out of their fighter-damaged aircraft. All eleven crewmen were rescued by the Chinese communists. Strike photographs showed bombs scattered about the complex, and damage to a nearby arsenal, warehouses and machine shops. Only one formation scored hits on the aircraft manufacturing facility itself.

Another training mission was mounted against Bangkok on 14 December. This time the primary target was the Rama VI Bridge. Rail traffic bound for Rangoon and the Burma front passed over this bridge. Each of the four groups of the XX Bomber Command despatched twelve bombers. The commander of the 40th Bombardment Group, Colonel William H. Blanchard, had his bombers loaded with a mixture of 1,000-pound TNT and 5,000-pound Composition B bombs. The latter was a far more powerful explosive and crews expressed concerns that with the Composition B bombs loaded underneath the TNT ones, the latter would fall faster and might cause the former to explode in mid-air. This indeed happened over Rangoon: four B-29 were so badly damaged that they crashed; another six made emergency landings at other airfields. One made it back to Chakulia, but with injured crewmen, one of whom died. Seventeen crewmen died and twenty-seven were held as prisoners of war in Rangoon until they were liberated by the British Army on 4 May 1945. Thirty-three B-29s attacked the bridge, which was not damaged.

=== Ichi-Go and the fire raid on Hankou ===
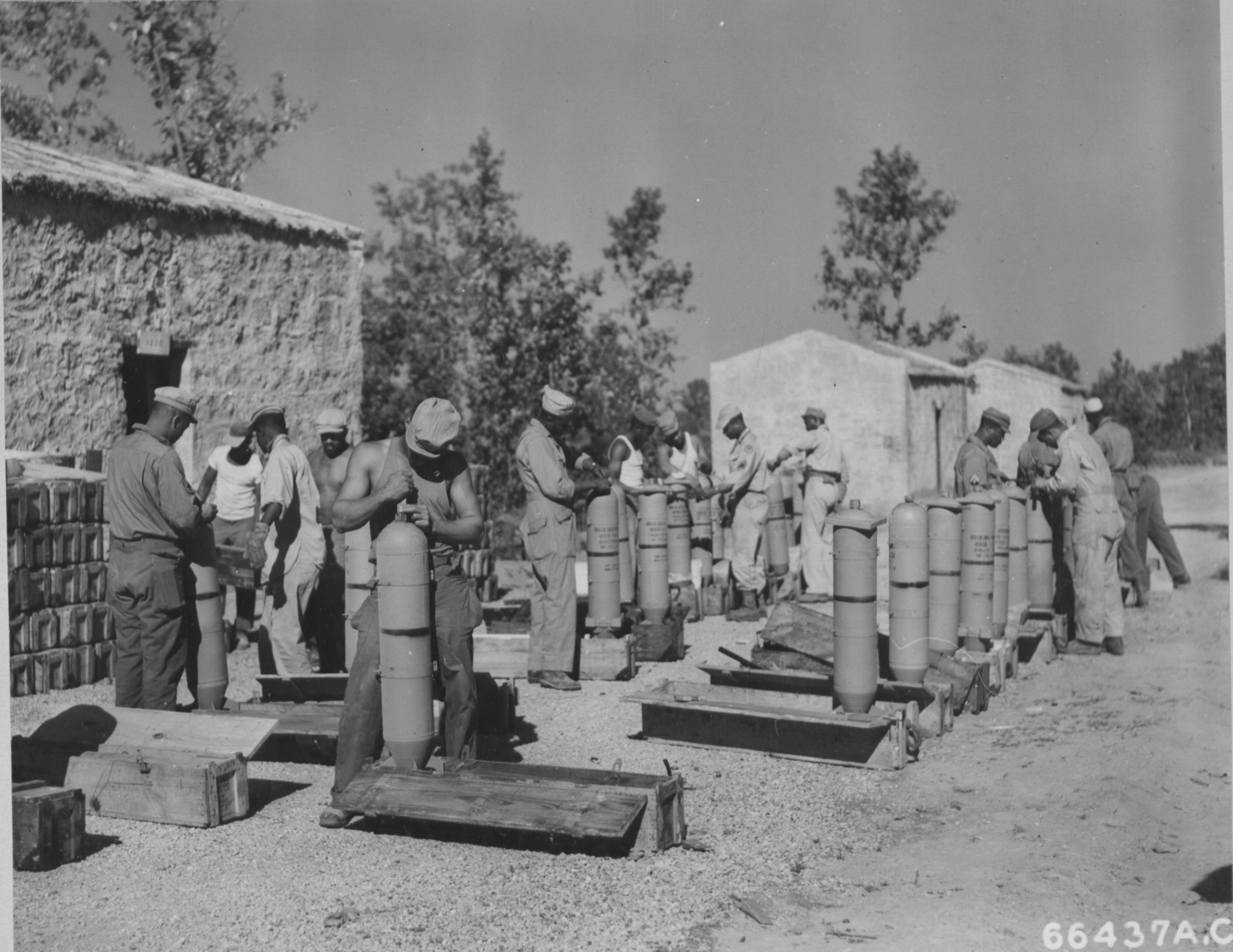
M47 chemical incendiary bombs being unpacked from their crates and prepared for use.

In April 1944, the Japanese launched Operation Ichi-Go in China, with the objective of overrunning the airfields in eastern China. To stop the Japanese advance, Chennault asked in June for the B-29s to conduct raids on Hankou. This was a major Japanese supply base. Supplies for the Japanese armies in China were shipped to Hankou via the Yangtze River, from whence they were unloaded and moved forward by rail or small vessels. It was also a major source of local procurement. As much as 20,000 short tons (18,000 t) of supplies might be temporarily stored in Hankou on a given day. A successful attack on the city would disrupt the flow of supplies to the Japanese forces in China.

Stilwell passed on Chennault's request to the War Department, but Arnold rejected any suggestion of diverting the B-29s or stocks of supplies allocated to them. After Major General Albert C. Wedemeyer assumed command of the newly created China Theater on 31 October, he requested a 100-sortie B-29 attack on Hankou. In his view, the Japanese threat to Kunming, the terminus of the Hump route to China, was the sort of emergency under which the Joint Chiefs had said the theater commander could take control of the B-29s. LeMay demurred, as it was not in line with his orders. On 16 December, Wedemeyer wrote to the Chief of Staff of the United States Army, General George C. Marshall, and repeated the request. This time, the Joint Chiefs of Staff approved the mission.

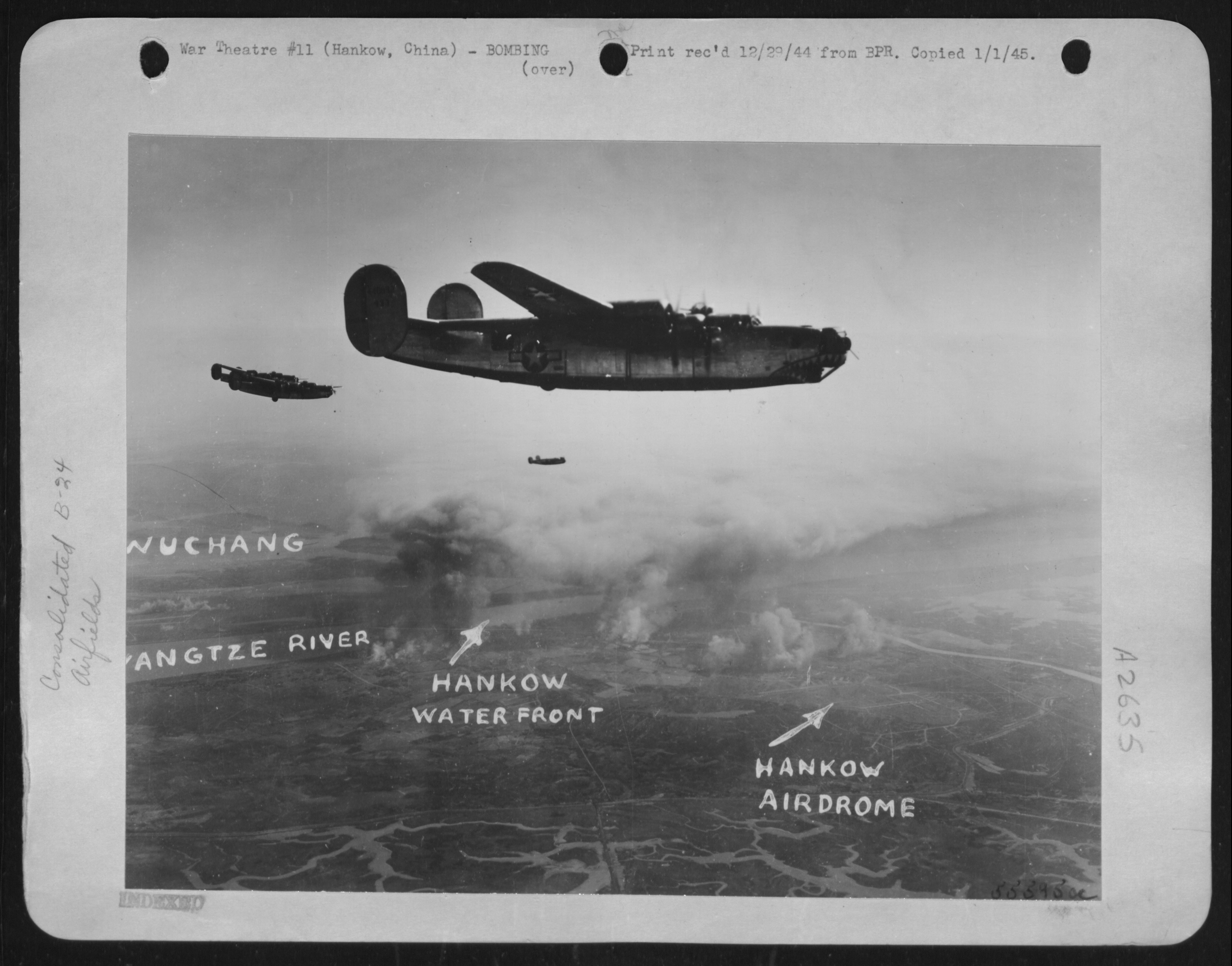
Fourteenth Air Force B-24 Bombers attack Hankou on 18 December 1944

The attack was planned in cooperation with the Fourteenth Air Force. Chennault had long been an advocate of using incendiary weapons on Japanese cities, and he persuaded LeMay to try a daylight raid with using incendiaries on the docks and storage areas along the Yangtze. The B-29s were therefore equipped with a mix of 100-pound M47 incendiary bombs, 500-pound M76 incendiary bombs and 500-pound M17 incendiary cluster munitions. Because a northerly wind was forecast, the B-29s would attack in four formations in succession attacking from south to north so as to avoid the target area being obscured by smoke. Two hundred Fourteenth Air Force B-24 Liberator heavy bombers, B-26 Marauder medium bombers and P-51 Mustang fighters would then attack Japanese airfields in the area. At first LeMay promised to send only sixty bombers, because he was in the process of withdrawing B-29s with unmodified engines from combat, but by adding some older models, he was able to provide ninety-four.

LeMay launched the mission on 18 December, with the B-29s carrying 511 short tons (464 t) of incendiary bombs and attacking at 22,000 feet (6,700 m). At the last minute, Chennault requested a 45-minute delay, but the 40th Bombardment Group did not receive the message, and as a result, the formations did not attack in the proper sequence. Eighty-four B-29s attacked Hankou, but only thirty-three bombers in the first three formations and a few in the last were on target. The Japanese regarded the attack as "highly effective". Large fires and columns of black smoke were observed. The attack left Hankou burning for three days. It was estimated that 30 to 40 percent of the target area was destroyed. Arnold informed the Secretary of War, Henry L. Stimson, that more than 100 warehouses, factories and office buildings had been destroyed, and that the attack was a "vital factor in limiting the speed, effectiveness and scope of Japanese operations in China."

=== Final raids from Chinese bases ===
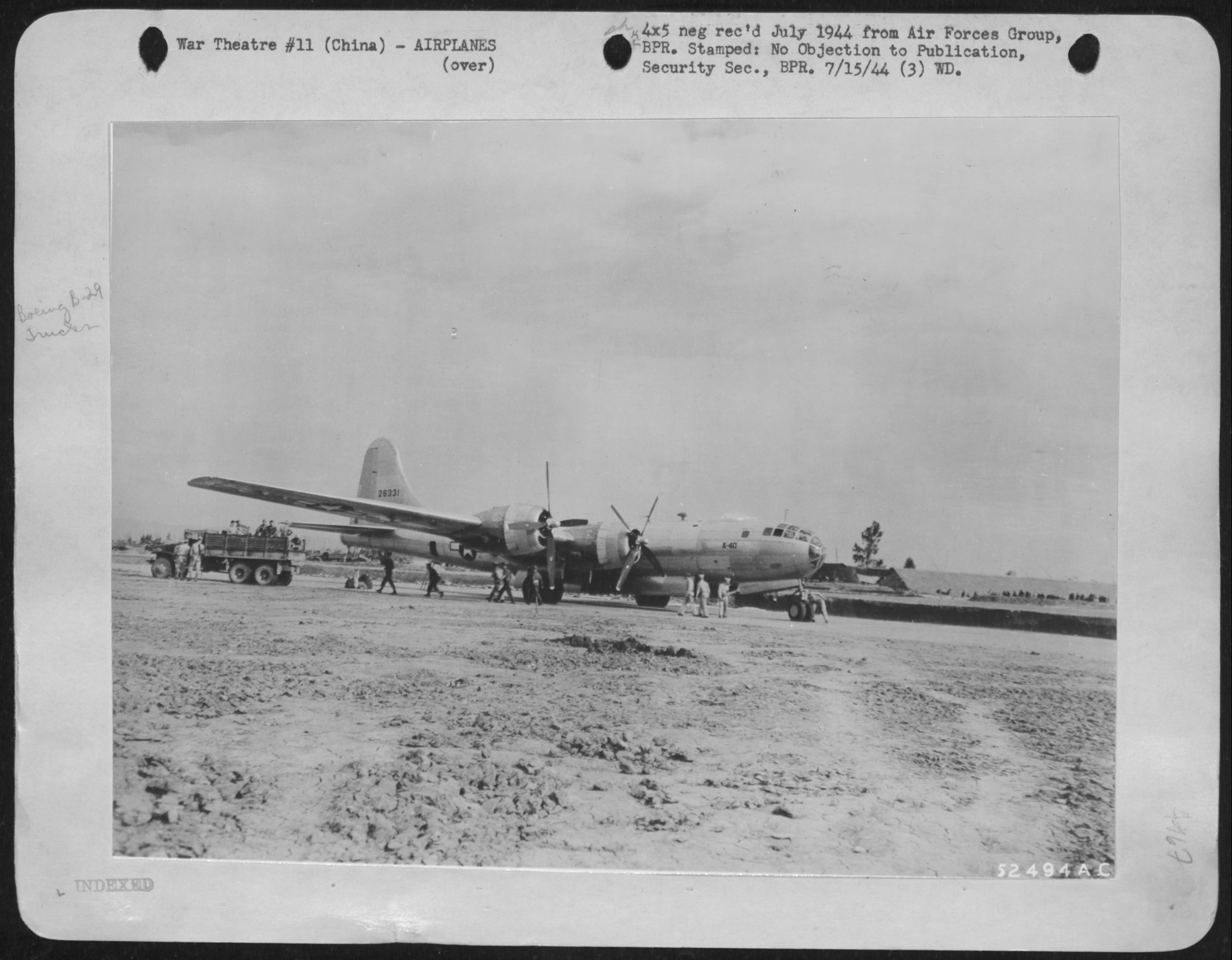
Superfortress 42-6331 Gone With The Wind, in Xinjin, China, June 1944. This aircraft was shot down by a British Bristol Beaufighter night fighter on 20 December 1944.

The following day, the XX Bomber Command attacked the Omura Aircraft Plant again. Only thirty-six B-29s went on this mission, as recurring engine problems had led LeMay to decide that only B-29s with recently modified engines should be flown over Japan. In the event, only seventeen bombed the primary target, all by radar as it was obscured by cloud cover. Another thirteen visually bombed the secondary target, the Kiangnan Dock and Engineering Works in Shanghai. An aerial photo reconnaissance mission showed no new damage at Omura; at Shanghai, a river steamer and several buildings were hit. No aircraft were shot down over either target, but two were lost due to engine problems that caused their crews to bail out over China. One man was killed when his parachute failed to open. In addition, Superfortress 42-6331 Gone With The Wind, was shot down on the way back to the base in India by a British Bristol Beaufighter night fighter due to a misidentification. The crew bailed out, but the navigator's parachute failed to open.

The XX Bomber Command made a follow-up raid on the Manchuria Airplane Manufacturing Company plant in Mukden on 21 December. Forty-nine B-29s were launched, of which forty found the primary target, but only nineteen bombed the plant. Frosting of the cockpit windows made it hard for the bombardiers to see, and when one mistakenly released his bombs, others in the formation followed suit. Two bombers were lost: Superfortress 42-24505 Wild Hair was downed by a pair of Nakajima Ki-44 "Tojo" fighters that attacked it with phosphorus bombs; and Superfortress 42-24715 Old Campaigner crashed after being rammed by an obsolete Nakajima Ki-27 "Nate" flown by Second Lieutenant Tahei Matsumoto. The radio operator, Staff Sergeant Elbert L. Edwards, was taken prisoner by the Japanese. He discovered he was the sole survivor when they asked him why he was the only member of the crew to bail out.

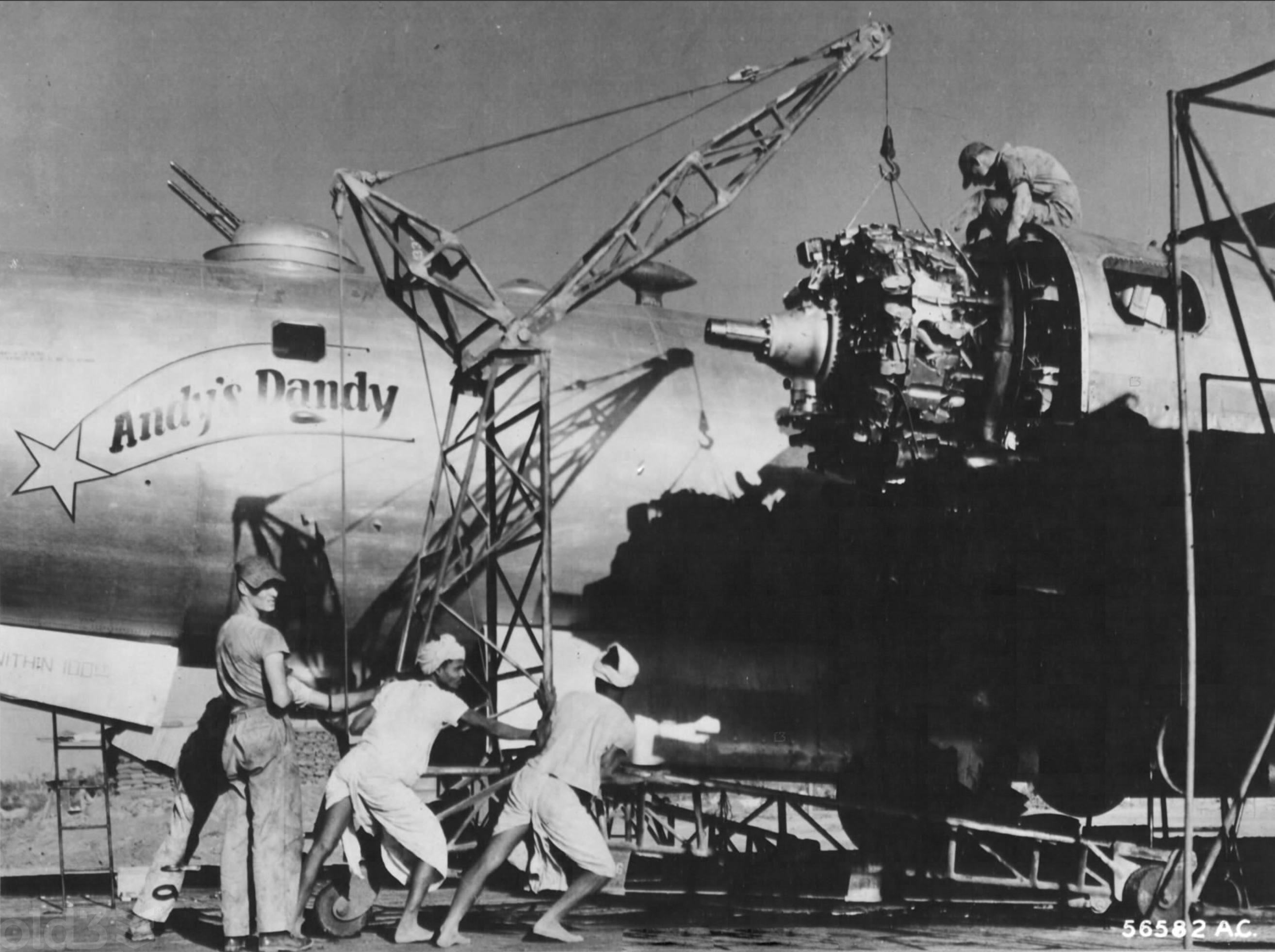
Boeing-B-29 Superfortress 42-65208 Andy's Dandy undergoing engine repairs in India

On 2 January 1945, another training mission was flown against the Rama VI Bridge in Bangkok. Forty-nine B-29s were despatched, of which forty-four bombed the target visually. It remained undamaged. No aircraft were lost. Four days later, the XX Bomber Command attacked the Omura plant again. This time, the primary visual target was the Tachiarai Machine Works; the Omura Aircraft Plant was the primary radar target. The Tachiarai Machine Works assembled the Mitsubishi Ki-15 "Babs" light bombers. While not the most significant aircraft plant in Japan, it was within convenient range of the Chengdu-based B-29s. The mission plan called for sixty aircraft, but only forty-nine took off, and only twenty-eight bombed the target. It was estimated that the 40th Bombardment Group's aircraft missed the target by about 5 miles (8.0 km). One B-29 was lost: Superfortress 42-265254 Rush Order was shot down by Japanese fighters and crashed in the Yellow Sea.

Another mission was flown against Formosa in support of the American landings at Lingayen Gulf on Luzon, in concert with the aircraft carriers of the US Navy's Task Force 38. Heito Airfield was the primary visual target and Keelung Harbor the primary radar target. Forty-six aircraft set out. Due to cloud cover over Heito Airfield, thirty-nine B-29s bombed Keelung Harbor. Seven bombers of the 40th Bombardment Group attacked the airfield but dropped their bombs 8 to 10 miles (13 to 16 km) short due to a malfunction in the bomb release mechanism of the lead aircraft. No aircraft were lost.

Two days later, the XX Bomber Command launched a follow-up raid on Singapore. This raid had been deferred due to poor weather conditions there in November and December. Forty-seven B-29s were launched, of which sixteen attacked the Admiralty IX Floating Dry Dock and nine bombed the King George VI Graving Dock. Neither was damaged. Two aircraft were lost to engine trouble. The crew of Superfortress 42-24704 The Gear Box, piloted by Major Donald J. Humphrey, bailed out over Malaya: three died, four were captured by the Japanese (one of whom later died in captivity), and four, including Humphrey, evaded capture with the help of communist guerrillas.

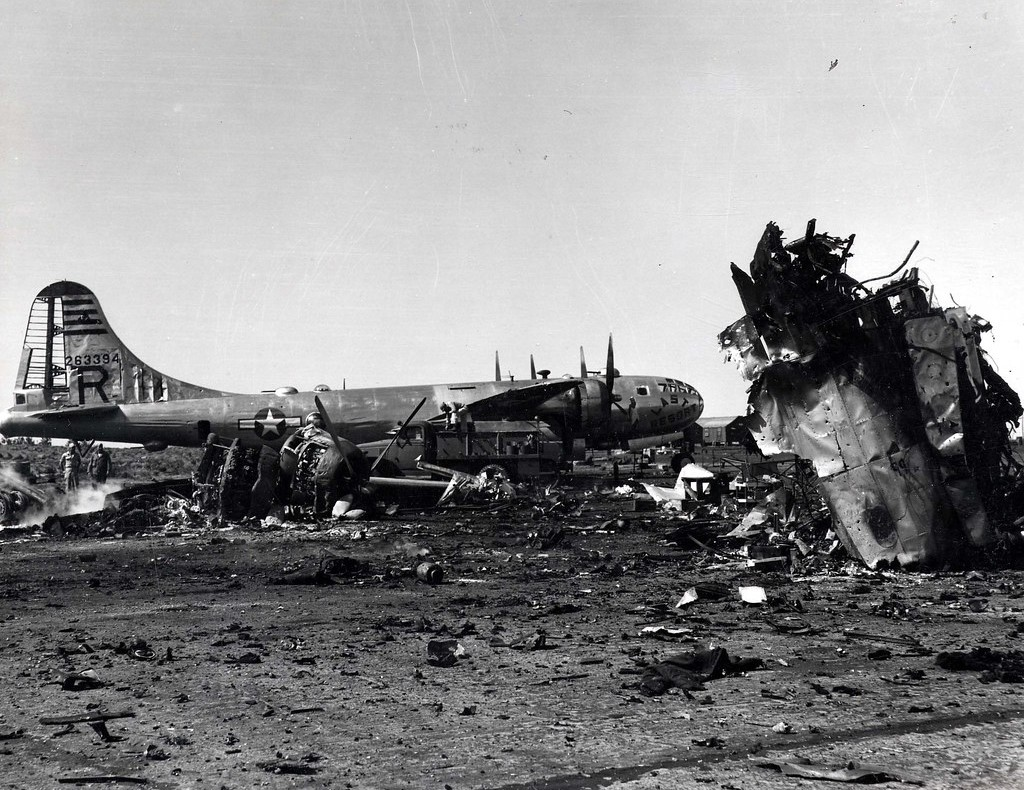
The aftermath of the bomb unloading accident at the 40th Bombardment Group's airfield in Chakulia, India, on 14 January 1945

The fast-paced January mission schedule came at a cost in fatigue among the maintenance and armament crews. An accident occurred on 14 January when cluster bombs were being unloaded from Superfortress 42-24582 Little Clambert at Chakulia. A cluster broke and one or more bombs fell from the rear bomb rack and struck a concrete doughnut. This started a fire in the bomb bay where there were other cluster bombs. A crew rushed to extinguish the flames and other personnel ran to assist. The bombs in the bomb bay exploded and nine men were killed and twenty-one injured. Not only was Little Clambert destroyed but nearby Superfortress 42-63394 Last Resort was so badly damaged it was written off, and there was damage to four other B-29s and a B-24.

On 14 January, the XX Bomber Command flew another mission to Formosa. This time, the primary visual target was Shinchiku Airfield, with the Heito Air Arsenal and Kagi Airfield as alternates. Eighty-two B-29s were launched from Chengdu. En route, LeMay switched the primary target to Kagi Airfield. Fifty-four B-29s bombed Kagi Airfield. Nine B-29s from the 40th Bombardment Group bombed Taichu Airfield after mistaking it for Kagi, as did three B-29s from the 462nd Bombardment Group. Nonetheless, there was considerable damage to Kagi Airfield. Aerial photo reconnaissance showed damage to nine hangars, and eleven barracks buildings had been destroyed by fire. An estimated sixteen Japanese aircraft had been destroyed on the ground. No B-29s were lost.

Three days later, the XX Bomber Command struck Formosa again, with Shinchiku Airfield as the primary target. This time, ninety-five B-29s took off, of which seventy-eight found the target. One B-29 was lost. Superfortress 42-24484 Mary Ann had an engine failure and the pilot, Major Clarence C. MacPherson, elected to return to Pengshan Airfield. A second engine then had a runaway propeller. The bombardier released the bomb load about six miles out, but, although the bomb arming pins had been removed, the bombs exploded and shrapnel damaged the rudder cables and damaged the tail. MacPherson then ordered the crew to bail out. All eleven did so, but the plane was too low and four were killed when they hit the ground. This was the last mission flown from Chengdu.

== End of Matterhorn ==
On 24 November 1944, American bombers commenced raiding Japan from the Mariana Islands, making operations from the increasingly vulnerable and always logistically difficult China bases redundant. On 4 December, Wedemeyer asked for the B-29s to be withdrawn from his theater. They consumed 14 percent of Hump tonnage in December, and Wedemeyer contended that in view of the critical situation in China, these resources would be better allocated to the Chinese ground forces and the Fourteenth Air Force to help stem the Japanese offensive. It would also release the 312th Fighter Wing from its defensive mission. Wedemeyer repeated his recommendation on 12 January 1945. Four days later, the Joint Chiefs of Staff ordered the XX Bomber Command to move to its home stations in India.

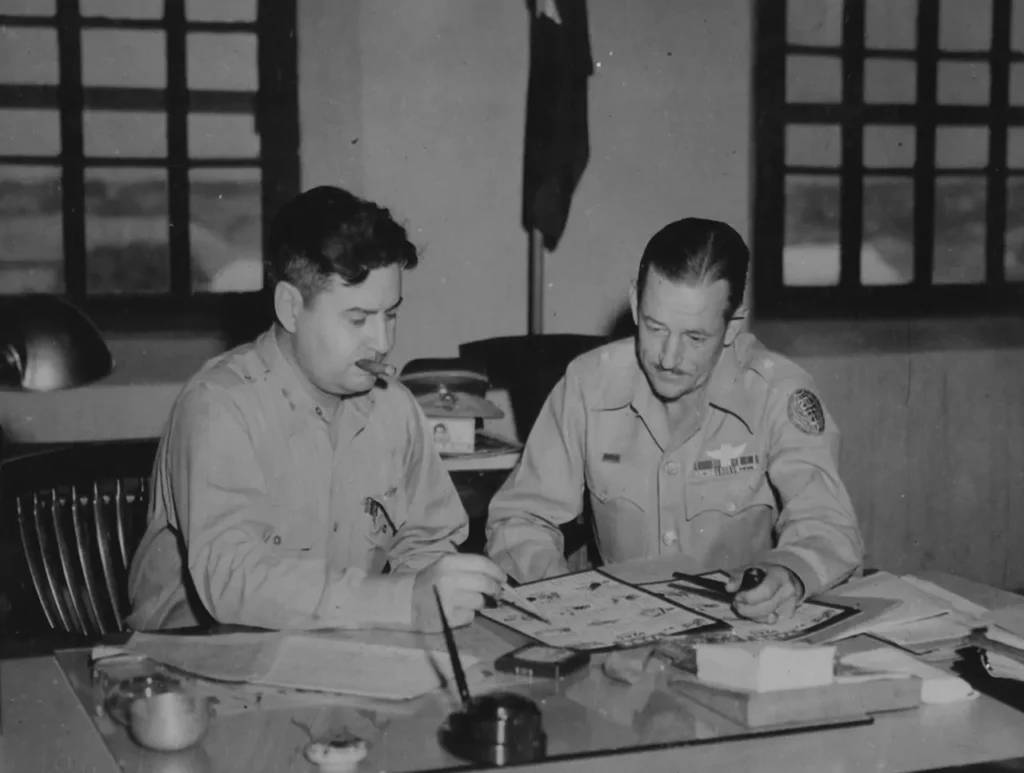
Major General Curtis E. LeMay (left), with his successor, Brigadier General Roger M. Ramey, shortly before LeMay's departure to assume command of the XXI Bomber Command

LeMay departed for the Marianas on 18 January 1945 to assume command of the XXI Bomber Command, leaving the XX Bomber Command in India in the hands of Brigadier General Roger M. Ramey, who became its fourth commander in a year. Brigadier General Joseph Smith became his chief of staff. The staff had anticipated the order to withdraw from China, and by 27 January, the XX Bomber Command had abandoned its bases there. This marked the end of Operation Matterhorn. Between January and March, Ramey's B–29s assisted Mountbatten's British and Indian ground forces in Burma by targeting rail and port facilities in Indochina, Thailand, and Burma. More distant targets included refineries and airfields in Singapore, Malaya, as well as Palembang and other locations in the Netherlands East Indies.

On 6 February, the War Department issued orders for the B-29s to redeploy to the Mariana Islands. The 312th Fighter Wing was reassigned to the Fourteenth Air Force on 8 February, leaving the 58th Bomb Wing, which was reactivated on the same day, as the only operational wing of the XX Bomber Command. The first water echelon, consisting of 2,275 men, sailed from Calcutta on 27 February. They were followed by an advance air echelon on 20 March. Four cargo ships loaded with equipment departed between 25 March and 4 April. An air echelon of 90 aircraft carrying 1,330 airmen flew to Tinian in the Marianas via Lüliang on 20 April; a second, of another 90 aircraft and 1,620 airmen, flew to Guam on 1 May. The last water echelon, consisting of 3,459 men, left on 6 May. The last shipment arrived in the Marianas on 6 June. The whole movement was accomplished without the loss of a single aircraft.

== Combat missions ==
Combat missions
Mission	Date	Primary target	Groups	Up	Bombed	Lost
1	5 June 1944	Makkasan railway yards, Bangkok, Thailand	40, 444, 462, 468	98	77	5
2	15 June 1944	Yawata Steel Works, Yawata, Japan	40, 444, 462, 468	68	47	7
3	7 July 1944	Sasebo Shipyard, Nagasaki, Japan	444, 468	18	14	0
4	29 July 1944	Showa Steel Works, Anshan, Manchuria	40, 444, 462, 468	96	75	3
5	10 August 1944	Baraban oil refineries, Palembang, Dutch East Indies	40, 444, 462, 468	54	39	2
6	10 August 1944	Nagasaki, Japan	40, 444, 462, 468	29	24	1
7	20 August 1944	Yawata Steel Works, Yawata, Japan	40, 444, 462, 468	88	71	14
8	8 September 1944	Showa Steel Works, Anshan, Manchuria	40, 444, 462, 468	88	72	3
9	26 September 1944	Showa Steel Works, Anshan, Manchuria	40, 444, 462, 468	109	83	0
10	14 October 1944	Takao Naval Air Station, Okayama, Formosa (Taiwan)	40, 444, 462, 468	131	106	2
11	16 October 1944	Okayama, Formosa (Taiwan)	444, 462	49	38	0
11	16 October 1944	Heito, Formosa (Taiwan)	468	24	20	
12	17 October 1944	Einansho Airfield, Tainan, Formosa (Taiwan)	40	30	10	0
13	25 October 1944	Omura, Nagasaki, Japan	40, 444, 462, 468	75	58	0
14	3 November 1944	Malegon Railway Yards, Rangoon, Burma	40, 444, 462, 468	50	44	1
15	5 November 1944	Admiralty IX Floating Dry Dock and King George VI Graving Dock, Singapore	40, 444, 462, 468	74	53	3
16	11 November 1944	Omura Aircraft Factory, Nagasaki, Japan	40, 444, 462, 468	93	29	2
17	21 November 1944	Omura Aircraft Factory, Nagasaki, Japan	40, 444, 462, 468	96	63	2
18	27 November 1944	Bangkok, Thailand	40, 444, 462, 468	60	55	3
19	7 December 1944	Manchuria Aviation Company, Mukden, Manchuria	40, 444, 462, 468	70	40	9
20	14 December 1944	Rama VI Bridge, Bangkok, Thailand	40, 444, 462, 468	45	33	1
21	18 December 1944	Hankou, China	40, 444, 462, 468	94	85	6
22	19 December 1944	Omura, Nagasaki, Japan	40, 444, 462, 468	36	17	5
23	21 December 1944	Manchuria Aviation Company, Mukden, Manchuria	40, 444, 462, 468	55	40	0
24	2 January 1945	Rama VI Bridge, Bangkok, Thailand	40, 444, 462, 468	49	44	0
25	6 January 1945	Omura, Nagasaki, Japan	40, 444, 462, 468	48	29	2
26	9 January 1945	Keelung Harbor, Formosa (Taiwan)	40, 444, 462, 468	46	40	0
27	11 January 1945	Admiralty IX Floating Dry Dock and King George VI Graving Dock, Singapore	40, 444, 462, 468	43	27	0
28	14 January 1945	Kagi Airfield, Chiayi County, Formosa (Taiwan)	40, 444, 462, 468	82	54	0
29	17 January 1945	Shinchiku, Formosa (Taiwan)	40, 444, 462, 468	90	78	2

== Assessment ==
The United States Strategic Bombing Survey stated that: "Approximately 800 tons of bombs were dropped by China-based B-29s on Japanese home island targets from June 1944 to January 1945. These raids were of insufficient weight and accuracy to produce significant results." It concluded that the B-29s "could have been more effectively used in coordination with submarines for search, low-level attacks and mining in accelerating the destruction of Japanese shipping, or in destroying oil and metal plants in the southern areas, than in striking the Japanese 'Inner Zone' from China bases." This was hardly hindsight; the use of the B-29s in this manner had been recommended by the Navy and MacArthur and his air commander, Lieutenant General George C. Kenney, in November 1943. But Arnold and his USAAF staff were intent on bombing Japan.

The XX Bomber Command failed to achieve the strategic objectives that the planners had intended for Operation Matterhorn, largely because of logistical problems, the bomber's mechanical difficulties, the vulnerability of Chinese staging bases, and the extreme range required to reach key Japanese cities. Although the B-29s achieved some success when diverted to support Chiang Kai-shek's forces in China, MacArthur's offensives in the Philippines, and Mountbatten's efforts in the Burma campaign, they generally accomplished little more than the B-17s and B-24s of the Fifth, Tenth, Thirteenth and Fourteenth Air Forces.

Chennault considered the Twentieth Air Force a liability and thought its supplies of fuel and bombs could have been used more profitably by the Fourteenth Air Force. The XX Bomber Command consumed almost 15 percent of the Hump tonnage per month during Matterhorn. Wedemeyer agreed. The two were happy to see the B–29s leave China and India. Despite those objections, Matterhorn did benefit the Allied war effort. Using the China bases bolstered Chinese morale and allowed the strategic bombing of Japan to begin six months before bases were available in the Marianas. The Matterhorn raids against the Japanese home islands demonstrated the B–29's effectiveness against Japanese fighters and anti-aircraft artillery. Operations from the Marianas profited from the streamlined organization and improved tactics developed on the Asian mainland.

== Sources ==
- "Sextant and Eureka Conferences, November–December 1943" (PDF). Sextant. World War II Inter-Allied Conferences. Washington, DC: Joint History Office, Joint Chiefs of Staff. 1943.
- "Diplomatic Papers, The Conferences at Cairo and Tehran, 1943". Sextant. Foreign Relations of the United States. Washington, DC: United States Government Printing Office. 1961.
