= Bombing of Yawata (June 1944) =

Air raid on Japan during the Pacific War

- Part of the Operation Matterhorn, as part of the Pacific War
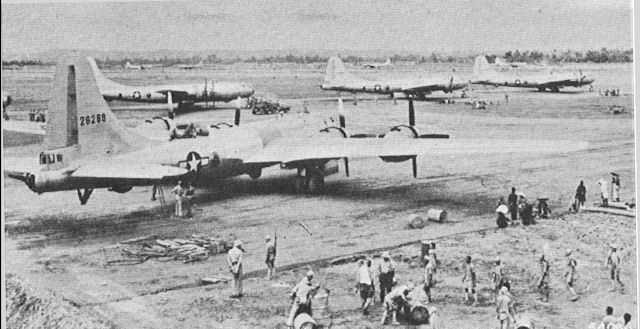
- Boeing B-29 Superfortress bombers at Chengu airfield in China shortly before participating in the 15–16 June 1944 raid on Yawata
Date	15–16 June 1944
Location	Yawata, Japan 33°53′N 130°53′E
Result	Inconclusive

Belligerents
United States	Japan

Strength
75 heavy bombers	24 fighters Anti-aircraft artillery

Casualties and losses
57 aircrew, 1 journalist 7 heavy bombers	Light damage

The bombing of Yawata (Yahata kūshū) on the night of 15–16 June 1944 marked the beginning of the United States Army Air Forces (USAAF) strategic bombing campaign against the Japanese home islands during the Pacific War and was the first such raid to employ strategic bombers. (Note: The Doolittle Raid of April 1942 was conducted using B-25 medium bombers.) The raid was undertaken by 75 Boeing B-29 Superfortress heavy bombers staging from bases in China. Only 47 of these aircraft dropped bombs near the raid's primary target, the Imperial Iron and Steel Works at Yawata in northern Kyūshū, and little damage was caused. Five B-29s were lost in accidents during the operation and two were destroyed by Japanese aircraft.

While the raid did not achieve its aims, it raised Japanese civilians' awareness that their country was being defeated and received positive media coverage in the United States. Intelligence gathered by the B-29s also revealed weaknesses in Japan's air defenses and the raid was the second of many on Japan. Yawata was attacked again by B-29s operating from China on 20 August 1944 and much of the city was destroyed in a firebombing raid conducted by B-29s based in the Mariana Islands on 8 August 1945.

== Background ==
The first United States Army Air Forces (USAAF) raid on Japan took place on 18 April 1942 when 16 North American B-25 Mitchell medium bombers flying from an aircraft carrier attacked several cities during the Doolittle Raid. Although this raid caused little damage, it boosted morale in the United States. The Japanese government responded to the attack by both increasing the number of fighter units based in the home islands and conducting an offensive in the Pacific Ocean which ended in defeat during the Battle of Midway. The USAAF could not mount further attacks on the Japanese home islands after this raid until the B-29 Superfortress heavy bomber entered service, as none of its other combat aircraft had sufficient range to reach this area from bases in China or the Pacific.

The B-29 Superfortress had a difficult introduction into service. Work began on designing the bomber in early 1940, and the first prototype flew on 21 September 1942. The Superfortress was the largest combat aircraft of World War II and boasted a heavy maximum bomb load, long range, and powerful defensive armament. The B-29 also incorporated a number of new features, such as a pressurized cabin and remote-controlled turrets. While 1,664 B-29s had been ordered by the USAAF before the aircraft first flew, its development was set back by several months when the second prototype crashed on 18 February 1943 (Note: Described by James Cate as "[wiping] out Boeing's most experienced B-29 personnel".) and problems with the design were gradually solved. The 58th Bombardment Wing was formed in June 1943 to operate the USAAF's first B-29s, but it did not begin receiving these aircraft until October. The slow delivery of B-29s and mechanical problems with the aircraft meant that the wing lagged behind its training schedule and only became capable of deployment in March 1944, after the so-called "Battle of Kansas" program began to produce combat-ready aircraft.

In late 1943, the United States Joint Chiefs of Staff approved a proposal to begin a strategic air campaign against the Japanese home islands and East Asia by basing B-29s in India and establishing forward airfields in areas of China. This strategy, which was designated Operation Matterhorn, required the construction of large airstrips near Chengdu in inland China which would be supplied by Allied cargo aircraft and be used to refuel B-29s traveling from bases in Bengal en route to bombing targets in Japan. XX Bomber Command was assigned responsibility for this effort, and its ground crew began to leave the United States for India by sea in December 1943. The Twentieth Air Force was formed in April 1944 to oversee all B-29 operations. In an unprecedented move, the commander of the USAAF, General Henry H. Arnold, took personal command of this unit and ran it from the Pentagon. The 58th Bombardment Wing was XX Bomber Command's main combat unit, and its movement from Kansas to India took place from April to mid-May. While the wing had not completed training at the time that it left for India, its combat groups were more experienced than most newly deployed USAAF bomber units.

== Preparations ==
=== American ===
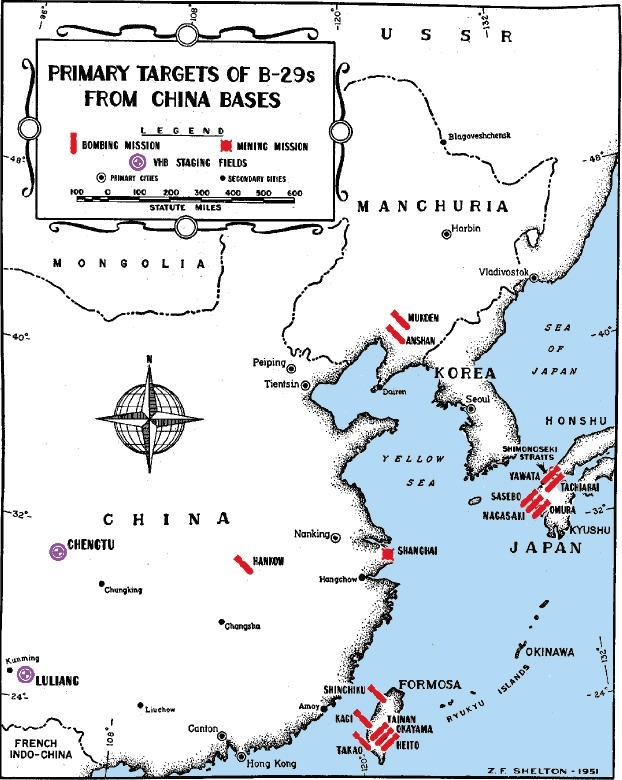
Locations of B-29 bomber bases in China and the main targets they attacked in East Asia during Operation Matterhorn

After establishing itself in India, XX Bomber Command under the command of Brigadier General Kenneth B. Wolfe undertook various tasks to prepare for raids against Japan. Foremost among these was stockpiling fuel at the airfields in China. Until late 1944, USAAF Air Transport Command aircraft did not transport fuel for XX Bomber Command, and this task was instead undertaken by the B-29s. This arrangement proved inefficient, however, as 12 B-29 sorties between India and China were needed to transport enough fuel and other supplies to enable one of the heavy bombers to fly a round trip between China and Japan. As a result, it took longer than expected to build up sufficient stockpiles in China to allow B-29 operations to commence. Moreover, continued technical problems with the Superfortress, and particularly their Wright R-3350 engines, resulted in many of XX Bomber Command's aircraft being unserviceable and in need of modification at all times.

XX Bomber Command conducted its first combat operation on 5 June 1944. On this day, 98 B-29s were dispatched from bases in India to attack targets in Bangkok, Thailand, as a 'dress rehearsal' for more ambitious operations against Japan and targets in South East Asia. Although little damage was done and five B-29s were lost to flying accidents and technical faults, the operation was rated a success by XX Bomber Command, as it provided useful combat experience for the bomber crews, as well as data on how the B-29 performed in action.

On 6 June, Wolfe received a message from Arnold informing him that the Joint Chiefs of Staff wanted a raid to be conducted against Japan as soon as possible. The goals of this operation were to relieve pressure on Chinese forces which were being attacked by the Japanese and to support the invasion of Saipan. Arnold's message also asked how many B-29s could be dispatched on 15 and 20 June. At the time, the first raid on Japan was tentatively scheduled for 23 June, when sufficient supplies were expected to be available in China to support 100 B-29 sorties. Wolfe replied, stating that 50 B-29s could be used on 15 June and 55 if the operation was conducted on the 20th of the month. Arnold regarded these numbers as too low and directed that a raid by at least 70 B-29s be conducted against Japan on 15 June. Following this order, XX Bomber Command's B-29s and transport aircraft embarked on an intensive effort to move fuel to China. Further fuel supplies were made available to the heavy bombers by reducing the activities of USAAF fighter units based in China. During the same period, the command's ground crews reconditioned as many B-29s as possible to improve their reliability.

The target selected for the first raid on Japan was the Imperial Iron and Steel Works at Yawata, an industrial city about 1,600 miles (2,600 km) from Chengdu. This was the single most important facility in Japan's steel industry, as it produced 24 percent of the country's total output of rolled steel. The facility was dependent on three coke plants, and the largest of these was selected as the designated aiming point for the B-29s. Nearby Laoyao harbor, which was an important industrial port, was designated as the raid's secondary target. The selection of Yawata's steelworks as the first target to be attacked was in accordance with a decision made by the Twentieth Air Force on 1 April 1944, which assigned the highest priority to attacking Japan's steel and coke industry. It was decided to conduct the raid at night, with each B-29 bombing individually, as the aircraft lacked the range needed to conduct a more fuel-intensive formation flight between the forward air bases and Yawata.

=== Japanese ===
Despite an elaborate deception plan, which included planted news stories claiming that B-29s would be deployed as bombers in Europe but only be used as armed transports in the China Burma India Theater, the Japanese military detected the preparation of B-29 bases in India and China. Moreover, Japanese agents in China reported on all B-29 movements, giving hours of warning time before raids on the home islands. Japanese intelligence services deduced that once logistical preparations were complete, the heavy bombers would attack factories in northern Kyūshū, and that the first raid would be made at night. On 26 April, Japanese fighters encountered a B-29 for the first time, when two Nakajima Ki-43 "Oscars" attacked and damaged a lone B-29 flying near the China–India border.

The Japanese military began transferring fighter aircraft from China and the Pacific to the home islands in early 1944 in anticipation of B-29 raids. In June 1944, Yawata lay within the Western District of Japan's four regional defense commands. The 19th Air Brigade was formed in June 1944 to command fighter units in the Western District and comprised the 4th and 59th Air Regiments. The 4th Air Regiment was stationed at Ozuki Airfield and was equipped with 35 Kawasaki Ki-45 Toryu twin-engined heavy fighters, of which 25 were operational in mid-June, and had the brigade's best-trained pilots. The inexperienced 59th Air Regiment was based at Ashiya Fukuoka Airfield and operated 25 Kawasaki Ki-61 Hien single-engined fighters, though only about seven or eight were operational. (Note: The Kawasaki Ki-45 Toryu and Kawasaki Ki-61 Hien were assigned the reporting names of 'Nick' and 'Tony' respectively by the Western Allies.) In addition, Yawata and northern Kyūshū were defended by anti-aircraft artillery units and barrage balloons. Radar stations and a network of lookout posts provided early warning of raids.

The 19th Air Brigade's primary mission was to defend the industrial facilities in northern Kyūshū, and particularly the ironworks at Yawata. The brigade's plans for the defense of the Western District called for its interceptor aircraft to be concentrated over Yawata and not move far from the area. While this inflexible deployment was considered unsatisfactory by the 19th Air Brigade, it was deemed necessary, as few aircraft were available, the only searchlight units needed to facilitate night operations were stationed near Yawata and northern Kyūshū was regarded by the Army as being the most important region in the Western District. Prior to the raid on Yawata, the 19th Air Brigade undertook joint planning with anti-aircraft units and implemented a training program which included practice in responding to alerts and night flying.

== Raid ==
The 58th Bombardment Wing's B-29s began moving from India to the forward bases in China on 13 June. By 15 June, 83 Superfortresses had reached the four forward airfields around Chengdu, though at least 12 turned back before reaching China, and another crashed, causing the death of its entire crew. Each of the aircraft had departed India carrying the 2 short tons (1,800 kg) of 500-pound bombs they would use in the raid. A large number of staff officers, including eight generals, also traveled to Chengdu to observe the operation but were not allowed to participate in the raid. The bomber crews were joined by eight journalists and three news photographers, however. At the time, the USAAF had few recent photos of Japanese industrial areas, and the bomber crews were briefed on Yawata using maps and photos from the late 1920s and early 1930s.

The Superfortresses began to depart their bases at 16:16 local time on 15 June. The raiding force was led by the 58th Bombardment Wing's commander, Brigadier General LaVerne G. Saunders. One aircraft crashed immediately after taking off with no casualties and a further four turned back suffering mechanical problems. The remaining 70 aircraft proceeded on a direct course to Okino Island, where they turned for the run-in to Yawata. Each of the 58th Bombardment Wing's four groups sent two aircraft ahead to mark the target and the other aircraft flew in a long bomber stream; both of these tactics had been adopted from those used by the British Royal Air Force's Bomber Command in Europe. The raiders were detected by Japanese Army and Army Air Force units in occupied China. These reports were passed onto the 19th Air Brigade, which estimated that the bombers were bound for northern Kyūshū and would arrive there at about midnight local time. A radar station and lookout posts on Cheju-Do subsequently detected the bombers from 23:31 to 00:30 local time. An air raid alarm was issued at 00:24 and 24 aircraft of the 4th Air Regiment began to take off three minutes later to patrol over northern Kyūshū. The 59th Air Regiment was not scrambled, as its pilots had not worked with those of the 4th Air Regiment in night operations, its aircraft were suffering from mechanical problems, and it was feared that the B-29s would sight and attack the base at Ashiya.

B-29s began to arrive over Yawata at 00:38 local time, and the attack on the city lasted almost two hours. Only 15 of the American aircraft were able to aim their bombs visually, as the city was blacked out and obscured by smoke or haze; the other 32 bombed by radar. Two further B-29s bombed Laoyao harbor in occupied China and another five struck targets of opportunity; overall 107 tons of bombs were dropped during the raid. After the first bombs were released, regular updates on the operation were transmitted to the Twentieth Air Force's headquarters in Washington, from where they were relayed to Arnold, who was in London at the time. The raiders were met with heavy but inaccurate anti-aircraft fire, and the searchlights stationed around Yawata were not effective. The 4th Air Regiment achieved the only kill of the night when one of its fighters shot down a B-29. The Regiment's other aircraft struggled to make contact with the bombers and achieved few interceptions.

The B-29s' return flight to China was largely uneventful. One of the Superfortresses was strafed and destroyed by Japanese aircraft after landing at Neihsiang with engine trouble, and a further two aircraft crashed with the loss of their entire crews and a correspondent from the magazine Newsweek. Overall, American losses in the raid were seven B-29s destroyed and a further six damaged by anti-aircraft guns; 57 airmen and one journalist were killed aboard these aircraft. Many of the B-29s were stranded in China for several days after the raid by fuel shortages there and only returned to India after Wolfe borrowed 15,000 US gallons (57,000 L) of fuel from the 312th Fighter Wing's supplies. During this period, the bombers were highly vulnerable to Japanese retaliatory raids, but none came about.

== Aftermath ==
Little damage was caused by the raid on Yawata. On 18 June, a USAAF Fourteenth Air Force aircraft overflew the city and photographed the target area. These photos showed that only a single bomb had landed within the Imperial Iron and Steel Works complex, and it had hit a powerhouse 3,700 feet (1,100 m) from the nearest coke oven. Light damage had also been inflicted on Kokura Arsenal and other industrial and civilian buildings in the area. Despite a USAAF policy of encouraging factual reporting of B-29 operations, the raid's results were overstated in the U.S. media. The light combat losses suffered by the raiders and electronic intelligence collected by the B-29s revealed the ineffectiveness of Japanese radar and air defenses. As a result, the USAAF dispatched a single photo-reconnaissance B-29 to overfly much of Japan and Korea on 21 June. This sortie was successful and greatly improved U.S. intelligence holdings on these areas.

The Yawata raid revealed serious shortcomings in Japan's air defenses. While the 19th Air Brigade initially claimed to have shot down eight B-29s and damaged a further four, it was soon determined that only two of the bombers had been destroyed. This loss ratio was considered too low to defeat attacks on the home islands. The raid demonstrated that Japan had too few airbases and not enough aircraft were available for night operations. It was also found that the Toryu fighter was not well suited to intercepting B-29s, as it was slower than the bombers, too lightly armed, and most aircraft lacked radar. While the air raid alert system had proved successful in this instance, the radars which detected the American aircraft had been unable to determine their altitude, and it was decided that there was a need to further expand radar coverage. The performance of the 131st Anti Aircraft Regiment during the raid was judged to be so poor that its commander was transferred to Manchuria. News reports of the Yawata raid and successful U.S. landing at Saipan on the same day also indicated to Japanese civilians that the war was not going well. In response to the raid, Japanese Government ministers urged families living in the country's four major cities to evacuate their children to rural areas.

The 15–16 June 1944 raid on Yawata marked the beginning of the USAAF's strategic bombing campaign against Japan. The city was struck again by B-29s during daylight and night raids on 20 August, but no serious damage was caused. XX Bomber Command conducted 49 raids from its bases in China and India between June 1944 and March 1945, of which nine were made on targets in the Japanese home islands, but Operation Matterhorn did not achieve its goals. Despite initial problems, XXI Bomber Command's operations from the Mariana Islands, which began on 28 October 1944, proved much more effective. As a result, XX Bomber Command was transferred to the Mariana Islands in early 1945. Yawata was targeted again by B-29s on 8 August 1945, two days after the atomic bombing of Hiroshima. On this day the city was attacked by 221 B-29s, escorted by three groups of P-47N Thunderbolt fighters, including the 318th Fighter Group based on Ie Shima off the coast of Okinawa. The bombers were armed with incendiary bombs, and the resulting firestorm destroyed 21 percent of Yawata's urban area.

== See also ==
- Air raids on Japan
