= Bombing of Bangkok in World War II =

Bombing of Bangkok
- Part of the South-East Asian theatre of World War II
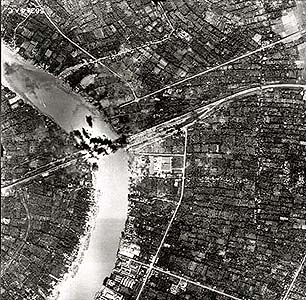
- Allied bombing of Rama VI Bridge
Date	7 January 1942 – 14 April 1945
Location	Bangkok, Thailand
Result	Allied victory

Belligerents
United States; United Kingdom; Free Thai Movement	Thailand; Japan

Commanders and leaders
(United States) Kenneth B. Wolfe; (United States) LaVerne G. Saunders; (United States) Curtis LeMay; (United Kingdom) Richard Peirse	(Thailand) Plaek Phibunsongkhram; (Thailand) Luang Atuegtevadej; (Thailand) Luang Tevaritpanluek; (Empire of Japan) Aketo Nakamura

Casualties and losses
30-100 killed January 1942 Bombing Campaign: 2 Bristol Blenheim shot down; June 1944 B-29 Raid: 1 B-29 shot down; 5 B-29 Superfortress crash landed in India.	2,000–8,711 killed

The city of Bangkok, Thailand was bombed by the Allies on numerous occasions during World War II because of its strategic importance as the logistic and command center for the Japanese Southeast Asian operations in their Burma and Malayan campaigns. Thailand would eventually declare war against the Allies on January 1942 making Bangkok a prime target for the Allied air forces.

The British and American bombings were aided by the Free Thai Movement, an Allied-aligned, anti-Japanese guerilla movement running by both Thai civilians and officials. Agents of the Free Thai Movement designated targets and locations of strategic Japanese positions and even reported on the weather over the targets for Allied aircraft.

Bangkok was also selected as the target for the first combat mission by Boeing B-29 Superfortresses in June 1944.

== Initial Allied air raids ==
Bristol Bleinheim Mk.V of the No. 113 Squadron RAF during the Burma Campaign.

Allied bombing raids on the Thai capital city of Bangkok began even before Thailand had declared war against the Allied Powers, since the Empire of Japan was using the country as a staging area for its invasions of both Malaya and Burma, with the reluctant agreement of the Thai government after Japan's successful invasion of the southeast Asian country on 8 December 1941. The Thai-Japanese declaration of Alliance was signed on 21 December 1941, with proper declaration of war against the United States and Great Britain occurring on 25 January 1942.

The first raid on Bangkok came on the night of 7-8 January 1942 at 02.00 AM, when Royal Air Force (RAF) aircraft flying from Rangoon, attacked military targets in the city such as Hua Lamphong railway station and Memorial Bridge. The American Volunteer Group, together with seven No. 113 Squadron RAF and three No. 45 Squadron RAF Bristol Blenheim bombers, were involved in the first raid. No. 113 Squadron's planes were piloted by No. 60 Squadron's air crew. Thai damage reports stated that Yaowarat Chinatown was erupted in flames, and other bomb hits were reported at Charoen-Sawat Bridge, Ministry of Interior building at Phra Nakhon district, Bang Rak Hospital and the famous "7-Story Building" of Yaowarat. 112 wounded and 31 deaths are reported as casualties, mostly Chinese and Muslims.

The second night raid was carried out by eight Bristol Blenheims on 24–25 January at 20.30 PM and included aircrew from No. 60 Squadron RAF. Some bombers were diverted towards the Ananta Samakhom Throne Hall then used as Thai Parliament to bomb nearby military installations. Thai anti-aircraft units, equipped with Type 77 Bofors anti-aircraft guns with the aid of Type 77 spotlight, fought fiercely against British bombers until 23.00 PM when all bombers returned to their base. Three Thai guards are killed, and 10 bombs hit the area of Throne Hall with four bombs proved to be duds and another two hit Throne Hall itself. One of the aircraft participating in the raid was shot down and crashed at Talat Phlu, then part of Thonburi Province across the Chao Phraya River with all crew lost. Thai writers Khun Wichitmatra and Ajin Panjapan witnessed this air crash.

The final RAF Blenheim raid against Thai targets in Bangkok and Thonburi was made three days later on 28 January by four Blenheims at 20.30 PM. The objective was Wat Liap Powerplant but the bombs missed and hit Chucheep Market and Kasat Suek Bridge instead while Wat Liap Powerplant received no damage. Thai navy shot-down one of the bombers at Thonburi with all crews lost.

During the period of January 1942, six aerial missions had been conducted against Bangkok – this divided into 3 bombing missions and 3 photo recon missions.

== Allied heavy-bomber air raids against Bangkok ==
Consolidated Liberator B Mark VI of the No. 159 Squadron RAF one of the units that frequently raided Thailand during the war.

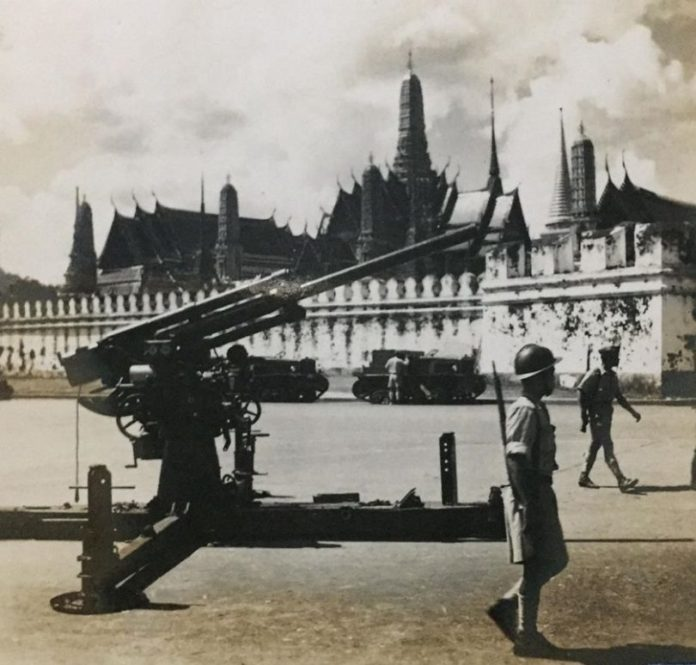
Post-War photograph of Bofors 7,5cm Type 77 anti-aircraft gun in Bangkok taken during 1947 Thai coup d'état. This type of gun was used against Allied bombers during World War II.

After the January 1942 raids by the Royal Air Force, the Thai government ordered a massive construction plan for air raid shelters to be built within Bangkok. Some air raid shelters were large governmental structures that could accommodate many individuals. One such large building used to be accessible is at Dusit Zoo (before it was permanently closed to the public when the Dusit area itself was returned to the crown land status in 2018). Some were mere covered ditches that were often flooded with rainwater. But at this stage of the war, British twin-engined bombers went completely silent because the Japanese had completely taken hold of most British colonies in Southeast Asia from Burma to Malaya. With normal daytime life starting to resume in Bangkok, the lights-out period at night were still enforced by the state.

After Rangoon fell to the Japanese on 7 March, heavy bombers, such as the RAF and American Tenth Air Force Consolidated B-24 Liberators, based in India and China, attacked targets in Thailand. The raids were carried out because Bangkok by then had become a command center for the Japanese on the Southeast Asian front. RAF and United States Army Air Forces (USAAF) bombers carried out the raids as part of the Pacific campaigns. The bombers struck installations used by the occupying Japanese military, but the raids were also intended to pressure the government of Thai military strongman Plaek Pibulsongkram to abandon his unpopular alliance with Imperial Japan. The major targets were the newly completed Port of Bangkok and the Thai railway system. Raids by RAF, USAAF, and other Allied air forces continued with growing intensity from India, and after the liberation of Rangoon on 3 May 1945, from Rangoon until the end of the war in August of that year.

1942 was characterized by a massive monsoon season which jeopardized the situation of the campaign in Burma. A June report from the Argus Newspaper stated both Allied and Japanese troops were forced to use heavy machinery, elephants and barges to supply their troops during the consecutive rainfall. In Thailand, the historic flood of the century arrived in its infancy in July 1942, when massive rainfall in the northern parts of Thailand ended up flooding Ping River, Wang River and Nan River – all are considered as major tributaries that led to Chao Phraya River and Bangkok. In late-September the flood reached Bangkok, and the people of Bangkok resorted to using their personal boats as their roads and tram lines became impassable.

American Bomber Missions 1942-1945

On 3 December 1942, CBI Roundup reported that India Air Task Force (Part of the Tenth Air Force, organized on 8 October 1942 with Brigadier General Caleb V. Haynes as a unit commander) attacked Japanese refinery in Bangkok Thailand. The attacks also included two night raids on Rangoon and a raid on Port-Blair in Andaman Sea. Several days later on 26 December 1942, US Tenth Air Force bombers from bases in India attacked Hua Lamphong railway station and the port of Khlong Toei, Bang Sue Arsenal, Samsen and Wat Liap Power Plants. After this December attacks, the bombing raid against Bangkok would be stopped for the next eight months until April 1943.

1943, B-24 Liberators of the Tenth Air Force resume their attacks on Bangkok. On 13 April 1943, 16 B-24 Liberators are launched against the Bang Sue Arsenal but only 4 reached its destination. Later on, 19 and 23 December 1943 American Liberators are sent to raid Hua Lamphong station and Khlong Toei ports respectively. It was also reported that on the night of 23 December, US Bombers have dropped illumination flares to guide their nighttime bombing. These are the only US raids against Bangkok in 1943.

In Tenth Air Force's perspective, 1944 is the year with most Bangkok bombing missions. Starting with January 10 air raid, the raid was divided into two objectives. First is minelaying mission at the estuary of the Chao Phraya River (Pak Nam) to block the Japanese-Thai shipping in the area. Another mission of the January 10 raid is the Marshalling Yard at Bang Sue and the Don Muang Airbase jointly operated by Thai and Japanese forces. The Tenth Air Force would continue to launch more raids against various targets around Bangkok for the rest of the year. (Two Missions in January, two in February, one in March, one in June, one in November and December) Tenth Air Force was joined by Fourteenth Air Force (Kunming) and Twentieth Air Force (Calcutta) with one January mission from the Fourteenth Air Force and six missions from the B-29 of the Twentieth Air Force from June towards the end of the year. For the Americans the B-24's role of bombing of Bangkok in 1945 is completely replaced by the newer B-29 from the Twentieth Air Force in Calcutta resulting in two January missions and one February mission.

British Bomber Missions

On the other hand, British Commonwealth also conducted their own air operations against Bangkok.

An account of Wing Commander J. Blackburn of No. 159 Squadron RAF in July-December points out that Japanese aerial resistance have become so rare he ordered his men to remove armor platings and reduce machine gun ammunition from their Liberators to reduce their weight. The payload has been increased to 8000 lbs for Bangkok and 12000 lbs for Rangoon. Some Liberators from No. 159 Squadron are also tasked with signal-intelligence role along the Bangkok-Moulmein rail line.

Liberators from No. 356 Squadron RAF attacked Wat Liap Powerplant on 16 April 1945 followed by the attack at the Khlong Phasi Charoen canal locks near Bangkok on 18 April 1945 by 8 Liberators all carried seven 1000 lbs bombs with one Liberator (B-24J/Liberator Mk.VI) nicknamed "Daedalus", serial KH272 crashed at Bang Yang canal locks gate (ประตูระบายน้ำบางยาง) after an explosion occurred within its bomb bay.

Wat Liap Power Plant attacks taken from RAF Liberator, 14 April 1945. Chao-Phraya River can be seen from the image.

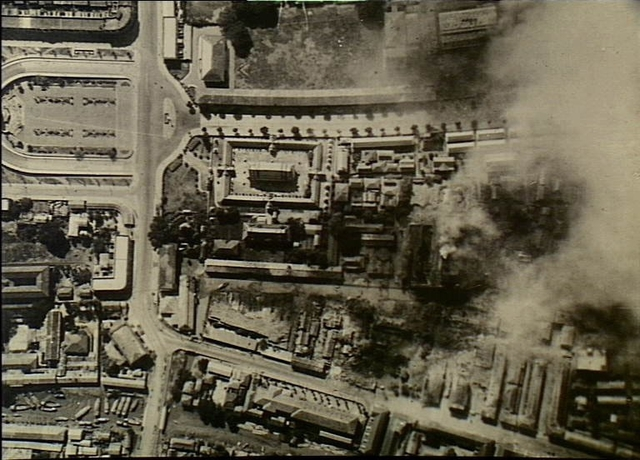
Wat Liap Power Plant attacks taken from RAF Liberator, 14 April 1945

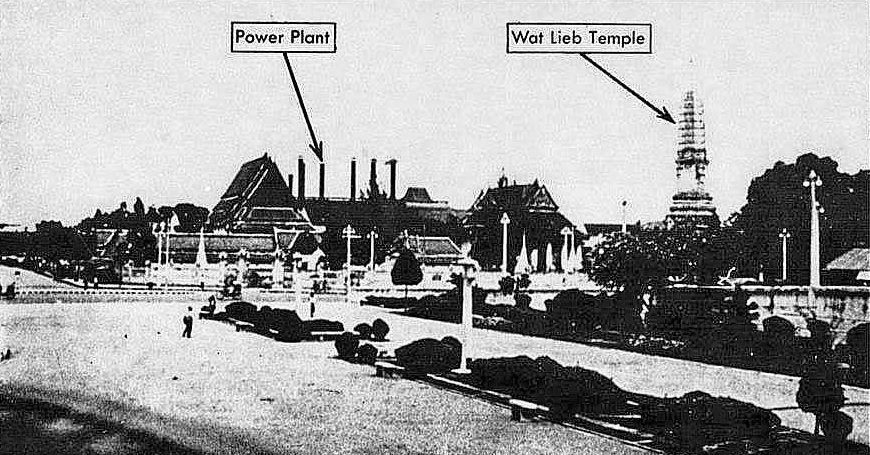
Ground view of Wat Liap Power Plant. The name Wat Liap originates from the nearby Wat Liap temple.

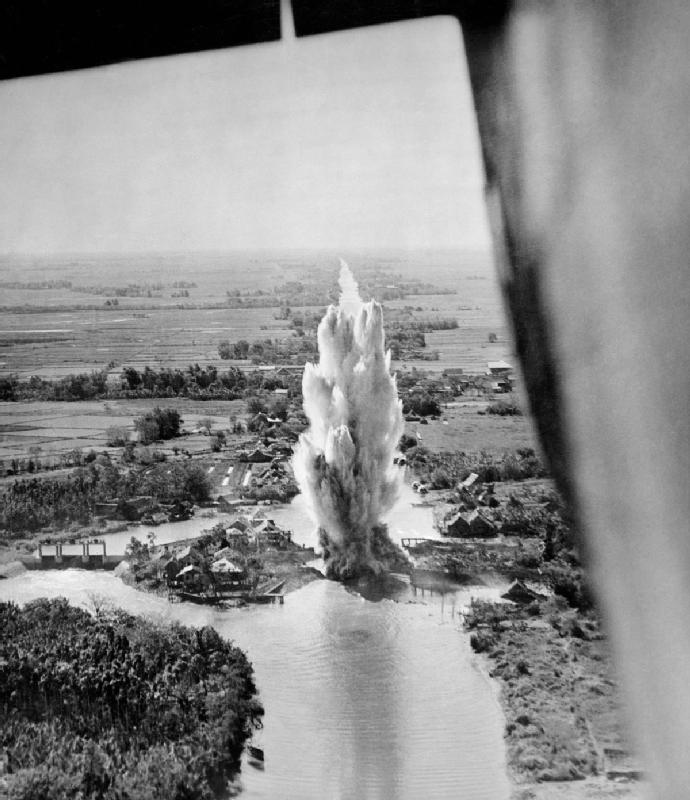
Photograph taken from RAF Liberator of the No. 356 Squadron RAF attacking the canal lock gates at Khlong Phasi Charoen near Bangkok, 18 April 1945.

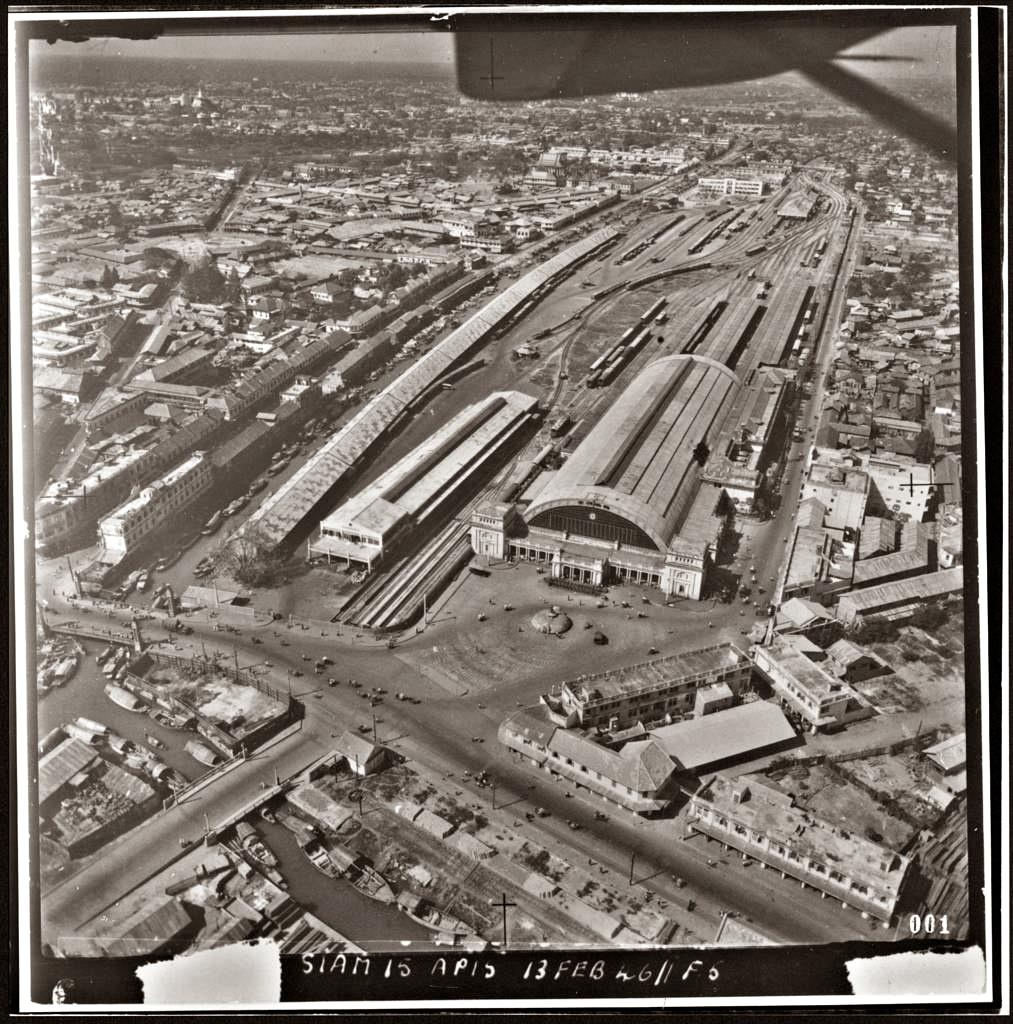
Aerial photograph of Hua Lamphong railway station in 1946 by Peter Williams-Hunt who was assigned to survey Post-War Thai agricultural areas for use in war reparations.
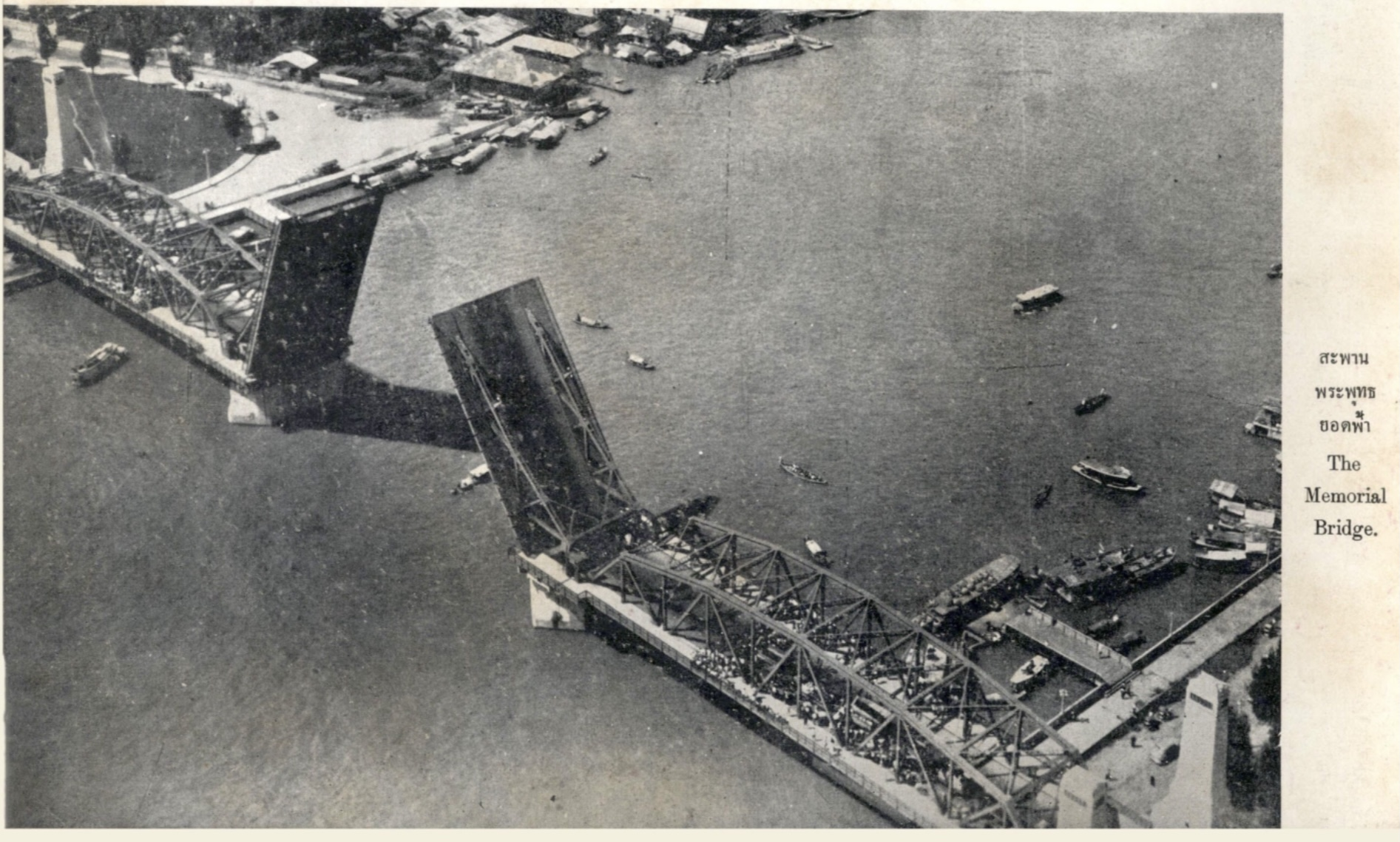
Top view image of Memorial Bridge or Saphan Phut taken in 1954. The bridge was attacked for several times during the war.

Ground view image of Memorial Bridge taken in 1943.

Post-War image of Klong Saen Saeb taken by Peter Williams-Hunt in 1946.

Post-War aerial photo of Sao Chingcha area taken by Peter Williams-Hunt in 1946. Democracy Monument can be seen at the top of the image.

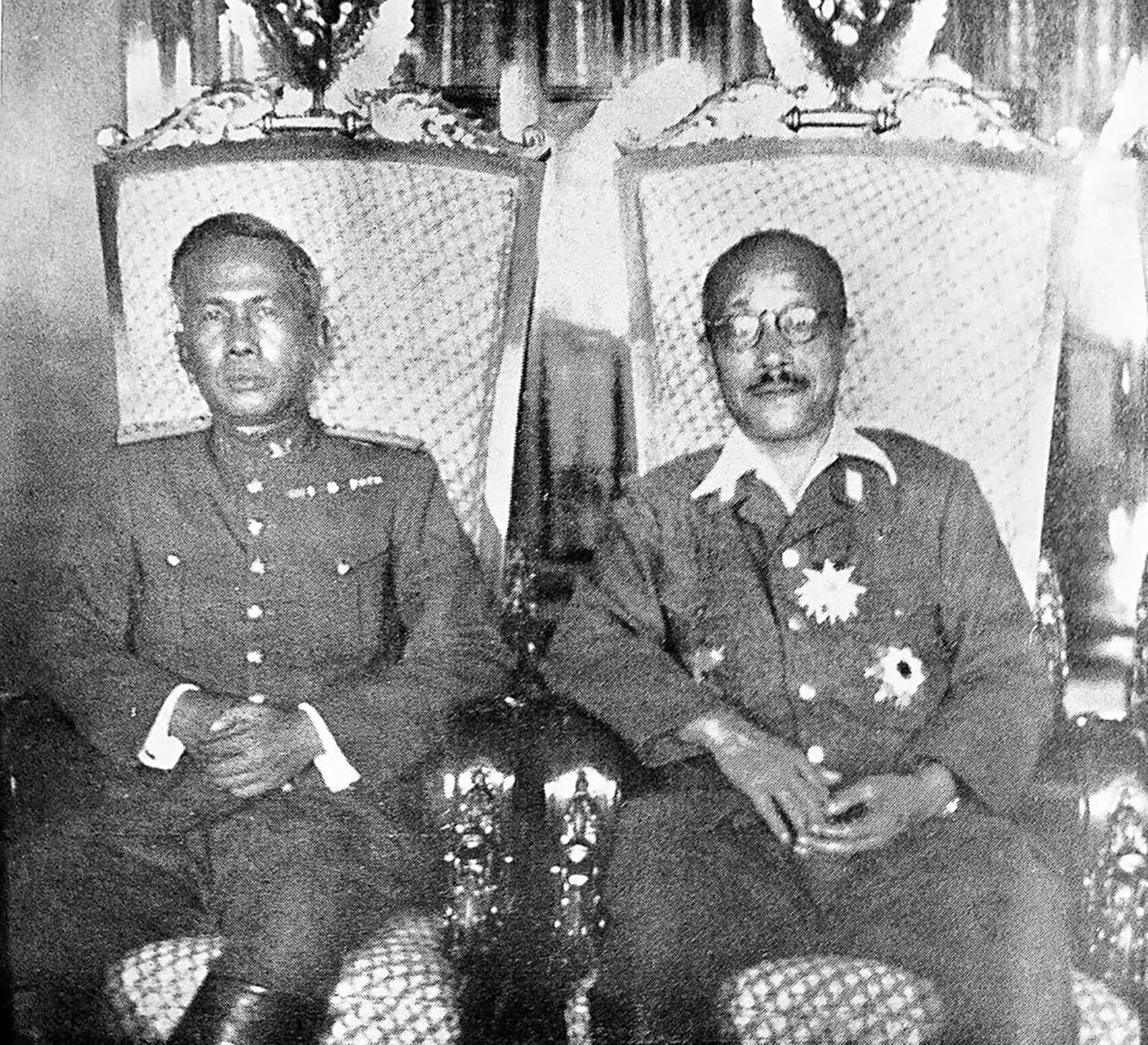
Marshal Plaek Phibunsongkhram and Hideki Tojo meeting in Bangkok, 6 July 1943. It was reported that after Tojo learned that Wat Phra Kaew was targeted as one of the Allied bombing targets he decided to transfer some of the Nakajima Ki-43 Hayabusa fighters to Royal Thai Air Force for Thai capital defense.

== Thai and Japanese responses to Allied bombing raids ==
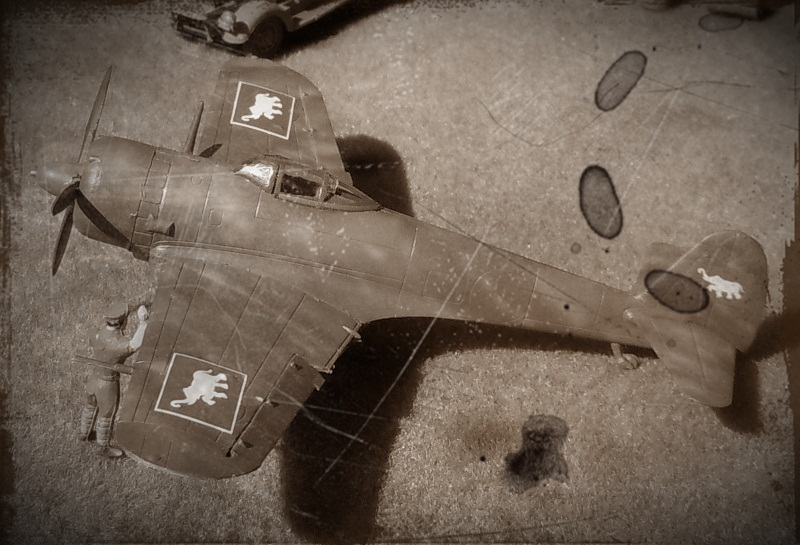
A scale model of Thai Nakajima Ki-43 Hayabusa

Roundel used by wartime Thai aircraft. The rectangular elephant flag was used to differentiate Thai planes from other Allied aircraft which used circular roundels.

Japanese Prime Minister Hideki Tojo visited Bangkok on 3-6 July 1943 as a part of his Asian Tour. He visited Bangkok to discuss about the handover of Malay and Shan states to Thai control with Marshal Phibun. On 3 July 1943, Tojo and Phibun went to pay their respect to the Temple of the Emerald Buddha or Wat Phra Kaew. Tojo reportedly said to Lieutenant General Aketo Nakamura, Japanese commander of the Thailand Garrison that Wat Phra Kaew must be defended by anti-aircraft guns. Nakamura then explains to Tojo that the Japanese have only one anti-aircraft unit in Bangkok, combined with few Thai anti-aircraft units it is unable to defend Bangkok from further air attacks.

The Royal Thai Air Force have organized an air wing to protect its capital in the form of 15th Fighter Squadron (also known as Capital Defense Fighter Squadron, ฝูงบินขับไล่รักษาพระนคร or 15th Hiko Chutai in Japanese) at Don Mueang air force base. The squadron operated 24 Nakajima Ki-43 Hayabusa fighters transferred from Japanese bases in Syonan (Singapore) with Thai "Running Elephant" roundels painted on its wings and tail section to differentiate themselves from Allied roundels.

Thai pilots are trained at Japanese-occupied Singapore and flew the planes back to Don Mueang by themselves. The Royal Thai Air Force sent three pilots to Singapore to train with Hayabusa, Squadron Leader Sakol Rasanont (นาวาอากาศตรี สกล รสานนท์), Flight Lieutenant Harinth Hongsakul (เรืออากาศเอก หริญ หงส์สกุล) and Flight Lieutenant Dawee Chullasapya (เรืออากาศเอก ทวี จุลทรัพย์) all pilots are trained with Japanese instructor named Nakamura from 3rd Chutai of the 64th Sentai. Story of Thai pilots and Hayabusa fighters have been a subject of some films, firstly a surviving Japanese newsreel (Released by NHK after the war) showed how Thai ground crews are trained with their newly received fighters at Don Mueang airbase while repainting Thai insignia onto each planes. Another Thai-produced film dubbed "The Night Pilot" (นักบินกลางคืน) have been destroyed from Post-War political reasons.

On 18 November 1944, 10 B-24 attacked Bang Sue rail junction. The Royal Thai Air Force deployed three Ki-43 Hayabusa piloted by Flight Lieutenant Therdsak Worrasap (เรืออากาศเอก เทอดศักดิ์ วรทรัพย์) veteran of the Franco-Thai War with one Morane-Saulnier MS.406 kill during that conflict, Pilot Officer Mom Rajawongse Priyasuwan Chakkrapant (เรืออากาศตรีหม่อมราชวงศ์ ปรียะสุวรรณ จักรพันธ์) and Flight Sergeant First Class Wichean Booranarech (พันจ่าอากาศเอก วิเชียร บูรณเรช) to intercept Allied bombers. But all bombers have left the vicinity before Thai fighters could reach them.

24 November 1944 50 B-29 bombers were sent to attack Bangkok in three waves from 09.00 AM, with each wave consisted of 12 to 24 bombers without any escorts. The 15th Fighter Squadron have 9 Hayabusa fighters led by Flight Lieutenant Chote Chinasiri (เรืออากาศเอก โชติ ชินะศิริ). However, only 8 planes are available at the time which were organized into two flights led by Flight Lieutenant Therdsak Worrasap and Pilot Officer Sak Indrapura (เรืออากาศตรี ศักดิ์ อินทปุระ). During takeoff, Thais lost another Hayabusa to the engine failure. Thai aircraft are joined with their Japanese brethren operating the same type of aircraft taking off from the other side of the Don Mueang air base. Therdsak Worrasap managed to chase and spend all of his ammunition on one B-29, shooting it down into the Gulf of Thailand while his aircraft was critically damaged by B-29's defensive fire and crashed near the coast. Therdsak himself jumps out with a parachute into the jungles of Petchaburi with burn injuries. He has to be transported for several days until he returned to Bangkok. Of 50 missions he flew, this one is his last. He was awarded with Bravery Medal with Chaiyaphruek Cluster.

3 January 1945 US XX Bomber Command, Twentieth Air Force sent in another raid on Bangkok to attack Rama VI Bridge. The Royal Thai Air Force sortied their Hayabusa for 11 times during the raid with additional reports of three biplane fighters taking off to intercept American bombers but can't catch up with them. (Thai military historian Rach Ratanawijarn have suggested those are Hawk III operated by RTAF) Through Free Thai Movement and its connection within the Royal Thai Air Force Flight Lieutenant Dawee Chullasapya have managed to make a copy of gun camera footage from Hayabusa fighters and covertly sent film copies to American intelligence.

Allied attacks against Don Mueang Air Base

Don Mueang was always listed as an important military airfield to the Allied air forces. On 7 April 1945, P-51D Mustang attacked Don Mueang with seven RTAF aircraft losses and seven personnel killed. On another raid 2 days later on 9 April 1945, USAAF sent 48 Mustangs against Don Muang but three of them returned to base before the mission could started. Two RTAF Hayabusa tried to takeoff but were forced to crash landed because of the overwhelming Allied forces in the air. Further strafing attacks destroyed four aircraft including one Ki-30 bomber. On 9 April 1945, USAAF lost 3 Mustangs according to Thai side. One aircraft Serial 44-15302 flown by Captain Albert Abraham based at Cox's Bazaar were shot down near Lat Lum Kaeo, Pathumthani. Remains of this airframe was preserved at Royal Thai Air Force Museum, Don Mueang.

== First B-29 Superfortress combat mission ==
Boeing B-29 Superfortress of the 40th Bombardment Group visiting Jumchar, India. Republic Thunderbolt Mark II of No. 30 Squadron RAF can be seen in the foreground.

In its first combat mission, the American Boeing B-29 Superfortress was used by the XX Bomber Command's 58th Air Division to strike targets in Bangkok, before it was deployed against the Japanese home islands. The decision to use the B-29s to bomb Bangkok dated back to 1943 and was mentioned in a communique between US President Franklin D. Roosevelt and British Prime Minister Winston Churchill in which Roosevelt suggested that they be used to bomb the port and railways.

On 5 June 1944, 98 B-29s led by the 58th's commander, General LaVerne Saunders, flew from airfields in India to attack the Makasan railway yards in Bangkok. A 2,261 mile round trip, the raid was the longest mission to date in the war. Only 77 of the B-29s made it to Bangkok, 21 others having had to turn back because of engine problems. Reaching the Thai capital at about 11:00, the bombers found their targets obscured by bad weather. The B-29s were meant to drop their bombs from between 22,000 and 25,000 feet, but instead released their bombs at between 17,000 and 27,000 feet. Only 18 bombs hit their intended targets. The others destroyed a Japanese military hospital and damaged the Japanese secret police headquarters. On their return to India, 42 of the B-29s had to divert to other airfields because of a lack of fuel. Five of these crashed on landing. Further raids were carried out by the Superfortresses against strategic targets in Bangkok.

== Temporary British occupation ==
At the end of the hostilities, British and Indian military forces arrived in Bangkok to disarm and repatriate the surrendered Japanese. On 9 September 1945, the RAF set up its headquarters under Group Captain Don Finlay of the No. 909 Wing RAF at Bangkok's Don Muang airfield. Three RAF squadrons were represented in Siam during the brief occupation: No. 20 Squadron RAF with Spitfire VIII aircraft, No. 211 Squadron RAF with de Havilland Mosquito VI aircraft, and a detachment of No. 685 Squadron RAF with Mosquito photo-reconnaissance aircraft. The airfield was defended by No. 2945 Squadron, RAF Regiment. Almost all the RAF units had left by January 1946.

== See also ==
- Far East Air Force (Royal Air Force)
- Thailand in World War II
- Bombing of South-East Asia (1944–45)
