= Battle of Kansas =

Production and delivery of U.S. bombers during World War II

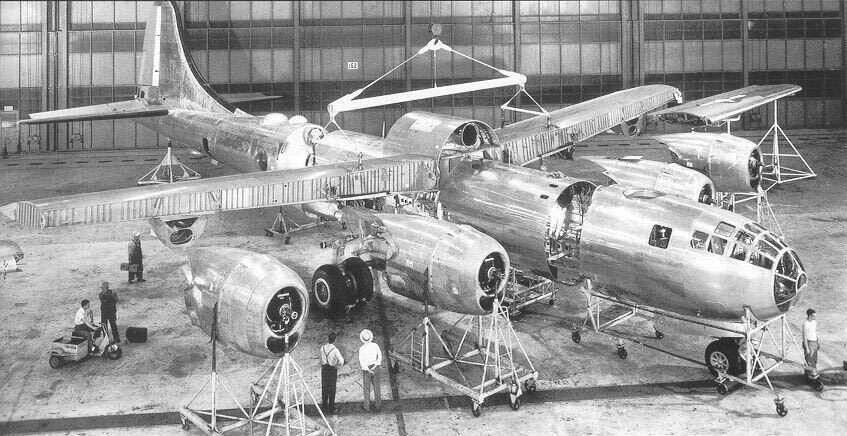
"Exploded" B-29 off Wichita production line showing the main sub-assemblies

The Battle of Kansas (also known as the "Battle of Wichita") was the nickname for a project to build, modify, and deliver large quantities of the world's most advanced bomber to the front-lines in Europe, and then to the Pacific, although because of delays in production, it was used only in the Pacific. The "battle" began as the first B-29 Superfortresses rolled off the production lines of the massive new Boeing factory on the prairie near Wichita, Kansas. (Note: All B-29s built at Wichita carried the suffix BW, e.g.: B-29-5-BW)

The Boeing B-29 Superfortress was a significant advance in aviation technology, which entailed a multitude of problems to be resolved before it was suitable for combat operations. The B-29 was ordered into production before the Japanese attack on Pearl Harbor, with the first flight of the XB-29 prototype still over a year away. On 6 September 1941 the U.S. Army Air Forces placed its initial production contract for 250 B-29s, built mainly in Wichita.

== Background ==
In early 1941 the Boeing Wichita factory (which was intended to become one of the main assembly plants for "Project 345") was building PT-13D & N2S-5 "Kaydet" biplane trainers for the USAAF and the USN respectively, as well as B-17 control surfaces. The plant needed massive expansion to build the new bomber so on June 24, 1941, ground was broken for what was to become "Plant II", which was completed in January 1943. New equipment was already being installed by Boeing six months before final completion. Also needed was a whole army of factory workers: people were recruited from all over Kansas and neighboring states. Accommodation for all of them needed to be found. Few of them had any experience in aircraft assembly and a large scale training program was required: they were expected to build a new type of aircraft.

At the same time as the new factory was being built the USAAF started forming the foundations of four "Bombardment Groups" (the 40th, 444th, 462nd, and 468th BGs.) Together they made up the 58th Bombardment Wing (58th BW), which was the first operational unit to take the B-29 into combat from as yet un-built bases in China. A fifth BG, the 472nd was formed as an operational training unit: this group remained in the U.S. and was disbanded in April 1944.

With its new wing design, new type of remote controlled armament, pressurized crew stations, and powerful new Wright R-3350 radial engines (with new, 16 ft (4.9 m) diameter, slow-turning Hamilton Standard propellers), the B-29 project was unprecedented in the history of aviation: from inception, to drawing board and mass production took three years, at a time when such a design should have taken five years just to produce a prototype. Instead the engineering design, production, and testing were undertaken simultaneously, with all of the expected and unexpected problems, starting from the time the first XB-29 (41–1002) took to the air on 21 September 1942. The USAAF under General Hap Arnold envisaged thousands of B-29s, and they wanted at least 175 of them as soon as possible. The Wichita factory started making components, then a run of 14 YB-29s in early 1943, before starting on building production aircraft by the autumn. (Note: YB aircraft were near production standard, built to test the airframe and components)

Soon after the fatal crash of the second prototype, USAAF Colonel Harman came up with a plan to coordinate the process of working the "bugs" out of the new aircraft, especially the engines. The objective was to take control of the entire B-29 program of production, aircraft modification, flight tests, and training. Approval for the "B-29 Special Project" came directly from President Roosevelt, who had been advised by General Arnold. In spite of this directive the B-29 program was to run into trouble.

== The battle ==
By Mid January 1944, 97 B-29s had been built by Wichita. Unfortunately only 16 of these were flyable with most of them grounded at "Modification Centers" (Note: The Modification Centers were Bechtel, McCone, and Parsons airfields, near Birmingham, Alabama and the Bell B-29 plant at Marietta, Georgia.) or on the 1,626,100 sq ft (151,070 sq m) parking/delivery apron at the Wichita plant pending urgent modification. The basic design of the B-29 was sound, but significant shortcuts had been taken in the rush to get it into service, causing numerous defects and quality problems. The Boeing-run organization, which should have been getting the B-29s ready for battle, collapsed under the strain.

The biggest headaches were caused by the new R-3350 engines, which were constantly overheating. (Note: After the crash of the second prototype (41-1003) into a factory building in Seattle, resulting from in-flight engine fire, General Hap Arnold ordered an investigation, which found numerous problems with the basic engine design. These were never fully resolved and the B-29 continued to suffer from overheating engines for the rest of the Second World War) Other problems arose with defective pressure seals around the cockpit windows and sighting blisters, which needed precise fitting to avoid leakage. Also causing problems were the sighting systems (four analog computers) (Note: Four gunners in a fully armed B-29 were able to control the four gun turrets using sighting computers in two pressurized crew compartments. The tail gunner, in a pressurized compartment under the rudder was only able to control his guns.B-29 remote control gunnery system) for the remote controlled defensive armament, as well as the turrets themselves. Then came electrical failures, caused by faulty Cannon plugs, which supplied connections throughout the ten miles (16 km) of wiring in each B-29. Sub-standard glass in the cockpit transparencies meant the pilots had problems due to the distortion. A minor "beef-up" was found to be needed on the wing structures.

Along with the main problems, constant alterations to other components were needed as the Army changed requirements and as updated components from external suppliers replaced those already in use. Finally, in June 1942 an extra complication was added when it was decided to use the Boeing-Wichita plant to build 750 CG-4 Waco gliders. As a result, the first production B-29s that rolled off the lines at Wichita were virtually hand built. It was discovered that there were some surprising weight differences from one plane to the next: this was caused by commercial weight tolerances in raw materials and because of the cumulative effects of small tolerances in the assembly process.

=== General Hap Arnold's demands ===
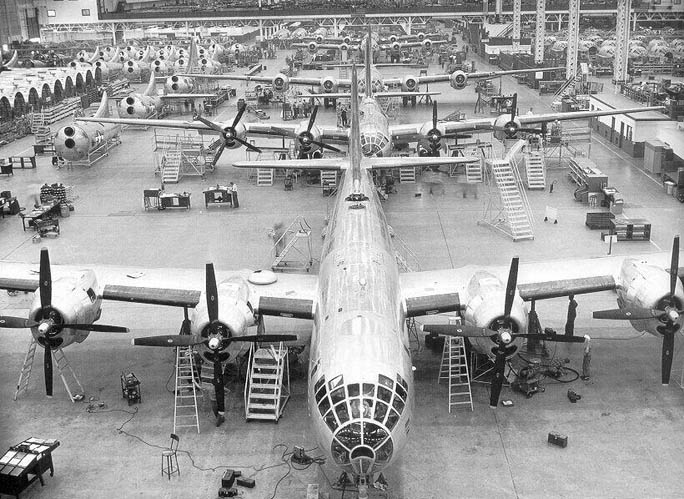
Boeing Wichita B-29 assembly line.

When General Arnold visited the Wichita Plant on 11 January 1944 he wanted 175 combat ready B-29s for the XX Bomber Command. As he was shown around the assembly lines he picked out the 175th fuselage section and signed it commenting: "This is the plane I want. I want it before the First of March." (Note: Rolled out on 28 February 1944, this B-29 became the Gen. H. H. Arnold Special with the 468th BG. Ironically it was to force-land in Vladivostok USSR and became one of the pattern aircraft for the Tupolev Tu-4) When he discovered two months later that no B-29s were actually combat ready, and that some had been sitting waiting for parts for two months or more Arnold was livid. In March 1944 General Bennett Meyers was given full authority to act under Arnold's name to get the B-29s modified and combat ready. Specialist USAAF ground crew and technicians were called in from all over the country and 600 workers were pulled from the Wichita assembly lines. Subcontractors were told to stop all work on non-B-29 components until they had fulfilled their commitments.

With the thermometer often reading below zero the 1,200 technicians who had gathered at the Wichita factory and the modification centers were being asked to modify each bomber inside and out. First, the wings needed to have some of the plating removed, the required "beef-ups" were added, and then each piece of skin riveted back in place. At the same time, the cowl flaps, which controlled airflow through and around the troublesome engines, were being modified. Each piece of glass installed in the nose had to be pulled out and replaced with new distortion free panes. After that, the pressurization had to be rechecked: 75 B-29s in total needed new glass. Internally every electrical plug had to be removed, disassembled, and resoldered – a total of 586,000 connections in completed aircraft, plus those on the assembly lines and in wiring harnesses ready for installation.

A lot of the work was being done in the middle of the frequent snowstorms: it was so cold crews could only work for 20 minutes at a time, with most of the jobs requiring delicate handling.

=== Wright Duplex Cyclone engines improved ===
One major challenge was pulling all of the Wright R-3350-23 Duplex-Cyclone radial engines out of already completed B-29s and modifying them to R-3350-23A "war engine" standard. This entailed disassembling and rebuilding the engines with added baffles to accelerate the airflow over the cylinders, new exhaust valves with improved metallurgy, new rocker arms (drilled with small holes, to allow better oil flow, rather than solid), and modified nose casings and engine sumps, again to improve oil flow. In sub-zero temperatures the work was arduous, especially when it came to struggling with stiff and brittle fuel and oil lines and hard-to-reach clamps, bolts, and screws.

Other necessary modifications, apart from those already described, were replacing the rudders with strengthened units, all main landing gear tires were replaced, and the main gear leg structures reinforced. APQ-13 radar sets had to be fitted. Finally, long range fuel tanks were installed in the bomb bays.

After about five weeks of exhausting work the first combat-ready B-29s started taking off on the first leg of the long journey to China. The final airframe took off for Smoky Hill Army Airfield (Smoky Hill AFB / Schilling AFB / Salina Regional Airport) on April 15, 1944. General Arnold had won the "Battle of Kansas" and was getting his 175 combat-ready Superfortresses.

== Notes ==
=== Bibliography ===
- Birdsall, Steve (1981). Saga of the Superfortress: The Dramatic story of the B-29 and the Twentieth Air Force. London: Sidgewick & Jackson. ISBN 0-283-98786-3.
- Herman, Arthur (2012). Freedom's Forge (1st ed.). New York: Random House. ISBN 978-1-4000-6964-4.
- Pace, Steve (2003). Boeing B-29 Super Fortress. Ramsbury, Wiltshire, UK: The Crowood Press Ltd. pp. 39–40.
- Phillips, Ed (July 1981). "Boeing's Battle of Wichita". Airpower. 11 (4).
