= LaVerne G. Saunders =

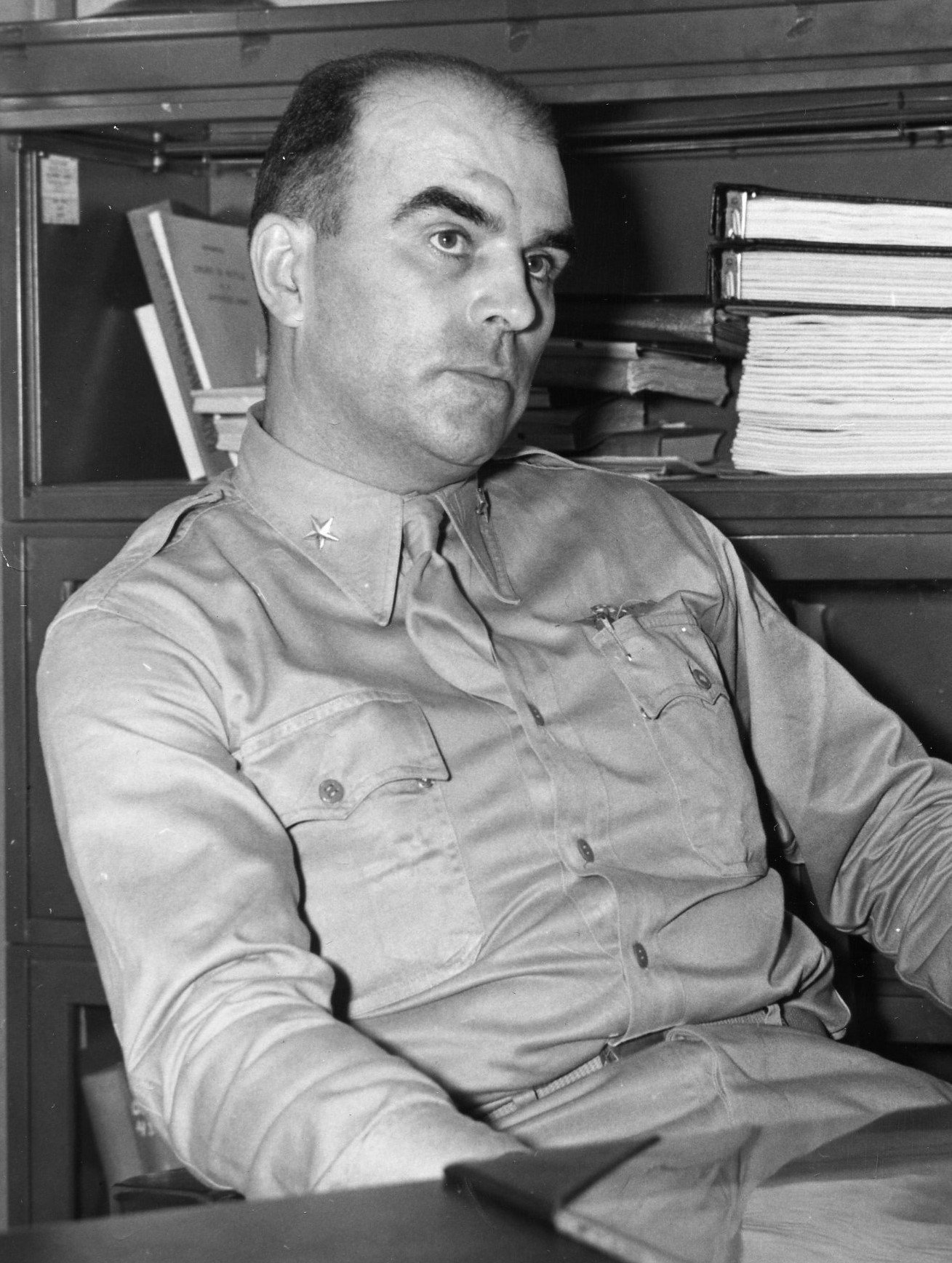
- Born: 21 March 1903; Stratford, South Dakota, United States
- Died: 16 November 1988 (aged 85); Aberdeen, South Dakota, United States
- Burial place: Sacred Heart Cemetery, Aberdeen, South Dakota
- Military career
- Allegiance: United States
- Branch: United States Army
- Service years: 1928–1947
- Rank: Brigadier General
- Nickname: Blondie
- Commands: XX Bomber Command; VII Bomber Command; 11th Bombardment Group; 23rd Bombardment Squadron
- Conflicts: World War II
- Awards: Distinguished Service Medal; Legion of Merit (2); Silver Star; Bronze Star Medal; Navy Cross; Distinguished Flying Cross; Air Medal; Commendation Ribbon; Purple Heart (2)

LaVerne George Saunders (21 March 1903 – 16 November 1988) was a brigadier general in the United States Army Air Forces during World War II. A 1928 graduate of the West Point, he was an assistant coach of the college football team there from 1931 to 1939. He commanded the 11th Bombardment Group during the bombing of Pearl Harbor and the Guadalcanal campaign. In November 1942 the bomber he was in was shot down and he ditched in the sea. In 1944 he commanded the 58th Bombardment Wing, and he led the bombing mission against Yawata, the first attack on Japan since the Doolittle Raid in 1942. He was involved in a plane crash in September 1944, and spent two and a half years in hospital before retiring in February 1947.

== Early life ==
At West Point in 1928

LaVerne George Saunders was born in Stratford, South Dakota, on 21 March 1903. He attended school at Stratford, Groton and Central High School in Aberdeen. He then went to the University of South Dakota, where he played college football from 1920 to 1923, and was a two-time all-conference player. He graduated with a Bachelor of Arts degree in 1924, and secured an appointment to the United States Military Academy at West Point, which he entered on 1 July 1924. He played tackle on the football team and was All-American in his senior year. His matches included the 1924 13-7 loss to the University of Notre Dame that prompted Grantland Rice to describe the latter's offensive backfield as the Four Horsemen, and 21-all tie against the Navy team played in front of over 100,000 fans at Chicago's Soldier Field in the 1926 Army–Navy Game. He acquired the nickname "Blondie" although his hair was jet black. In 1926, Notre Dame coach Knute Rockne opined on Saunders' playing style that he was, "the waiting type of tackle, but very effective in [his] own way."

Saunders also played on the academy's lacrosse team.

Saunders graduated for West Point on 9 June 1928, ranked 214th in the class, and was commissioned as a second lieutenant in the Infantry. He was then detailed to the Air Corps for flight training on 8 September 1928. He underwent primary flight training at Brooks Field, Texas, from 9 September to 28 June 1929, and then advanced training at Kelly Field, Texas, from 1 July to 12 October 1929. Upon the successful completion of his training, he was transferred to the Air Corps on 21 November 1929. After service with the 2d Bombardment Group at Langley Field, Virginia, Saunders returned to West Point as Assistant Coach of the football team, along with Russell Reeder, known as "Red". He held this position through the 1930s.

== World War II ==
On 15 December 1939, Saunders was assigned to Hickham Field in the Territory of Hawaii, where he commanded the 23rd Bombardment Squadron and then the 11th Bombardment Group. His unit was caught on the ground in the attack on Pearl Harbor on 7 December 1941 and many of his aircraft were destroyed. Although he were able to launch patrols later in the day, they were unable to find the Japanese fleet. In August 1942, the 11th Bombardment Group was transferred to Espiritu Santo in the New Hebrides. On 29 July 1942, Saunders led nine of his Boeing B-17 Flying Fortress bombers in the first raid on Guadalcanal.

It was his task to support the Guadalcanal campaign, reporting and attacking Japanese forces in the area. This involved 1,600 miles (2,600 km) round trips. Conditions were extremely difficult; there were shortages of spare parts and fuel for the bombers. Refueling had to be done with hand pumps and each B-17 required fifty drums of fuel per mission. He was unable to intercept the Tokyo Express, for his aircraft had to first make the 640 miles (1,030 km) flight to Guadalcanal, by which time the Japanese ships were out of range.

On 18 November 1942, he led his group of B-17s in a daylight raid on enemy shipping in the Buin area. His aircraft came under attack by swarms of Japanese fighters. His pilot was killed and the copilot was mortally wounded. Saunders was wounded in the head and left arm by shell fragments. He lifted the copilot from his seat and took the controls of the damaged aircraft. The left wing was on fire and both engines on that wing were inoperable. He managed to crash land in the sea. He helped the crew inflate rafts and they paddled to Vella Lavella, where they were rescued by an Australian coastwatcher, who sheltered them and arranged for a Navy PBY Catalina flying boat to collect them the following day. For this action, Saunders was awarded the Navy Cross, a rare award for an Army officer. For his service in the South Pacific, he was also awarded the Distinguished Service Medal, the Silver Star, the Bronze Star Medal, the Distinguished Flying Cross, the Commendation Ribbon and the Purple Heart.

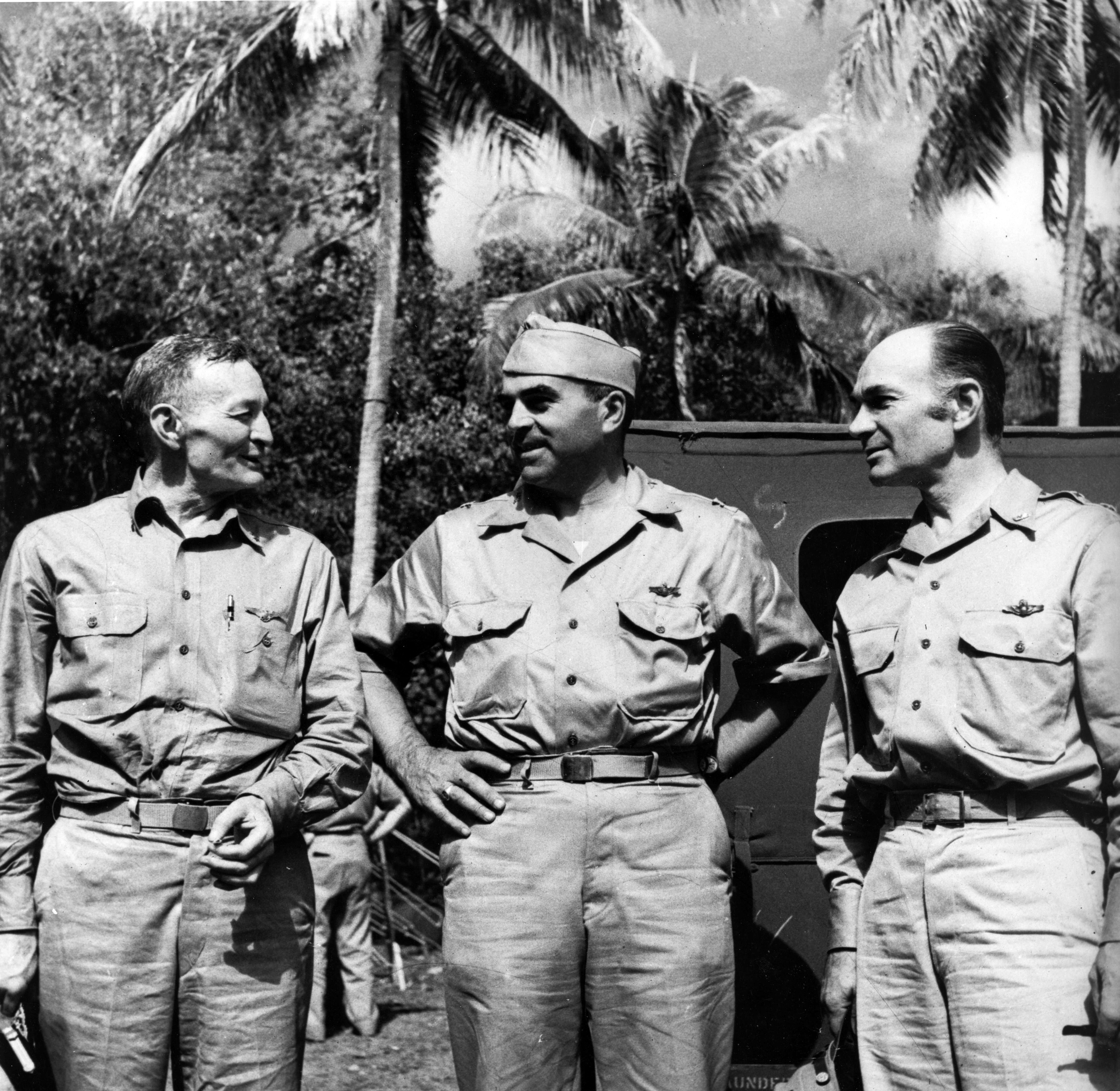
Saunders (center) with Rear Admiral John S. McCain Sr. (left) and Major General Millard Harmon at Espiritu Santo, New Hebrides, in August 1942.

Saunders commanded the VII Bomber Command from January to March 1943, and was chief of staff of the Seventh Air Force from March to June 1943. He then returned to the United States, where he became the chief of staff of the 58th Bombardment Wing. This wing, under the command of Brigadier General Kenneth B. Wolfe, was the first to be equipped with the new Boeing B-29 Superfortress bomber. Saunders succeeded Wolfe as the 58th Bombardment Wing's commander in March 1944, and the wing deployed to the China-Burma-India Theater the following month. Saunders landed the lead B-29 at Kwanghan on 24 April. and he led the bombing mission against Yawata, the first attack on Japan since the Doolittle Raid in 1942, on 15 June. Wolfe was recalled to the United states on 4 July 1944, leaving Saunders in temporary command of the XX Bomber Command.

Saunders was succeeded by Major General Curtis LeMay on 29 August 1944. He stayed on for several more weeks to assist LeMay before returning to the United States to assume command of another B-29 wing. On 18 September a B-25 Mitchell bomber he was flying in during an administrative flight disappeared. LeMay ordered a search, and the wreckage was found in the jungle 3 miles (4.8 km) from base in India it had taken off from. LeMay and his pilot landed at the base and walked to the crash site. Saunders was the only survivor. His ankle was crushed. He spent the next two and a half years in hospital, where part of his leg was removed. For his services in China-Burma-India he was awarded the Air Medal and the Legion of Merit with an oak leaf cluster.

== Later life ==
Saunders was retired from the Army on account of his disability on 28 February 1947. He returned to Aberdeen, South Dakota, where he was the district manager of the Rushmore Mutual Life Insurance Company and the President of Saunders Motor Sales. His son Second Lieutenant Saunders, Maurice M. Saunders was killed in the crash of a Douglas A-26 Invader bomber at Donelson, Tennessee, on 16 January 1954. Aberdeen Municipal Airport was named Saunders Field in his honor in 1946 but was renamed Aberdeen Regional Airport in 1979. He ran unsuccessfully for mayor of Aberdeen. He died in Aberdeen on 16 November 1988 and was buried in Sacred Heart Cemetery there.

== Dates of rank ==
Insignia	Rank	Component	Date	Reference
	Second Lieutenant	Infantry	9 June 1928	
	Second Lieutenant	Air Corps	21 November 1929	
	First Lieutenant	Air Corps	1 October 1934	
	Captain	Air Corps	9 June 1938	
	Major	Army of the United States	1 February 1941	
	Lieutenant Colonel	Army of the United States	5 January 1942	
	Colonel	Army of the United States	1 March 1942	
	Brigadier general	Army of the United States	25 December 1942	
	Brigadier general	Retired	28 February 1947	
