= Kenneth B. Wolfe =

United States Air Force general (1898–1971)

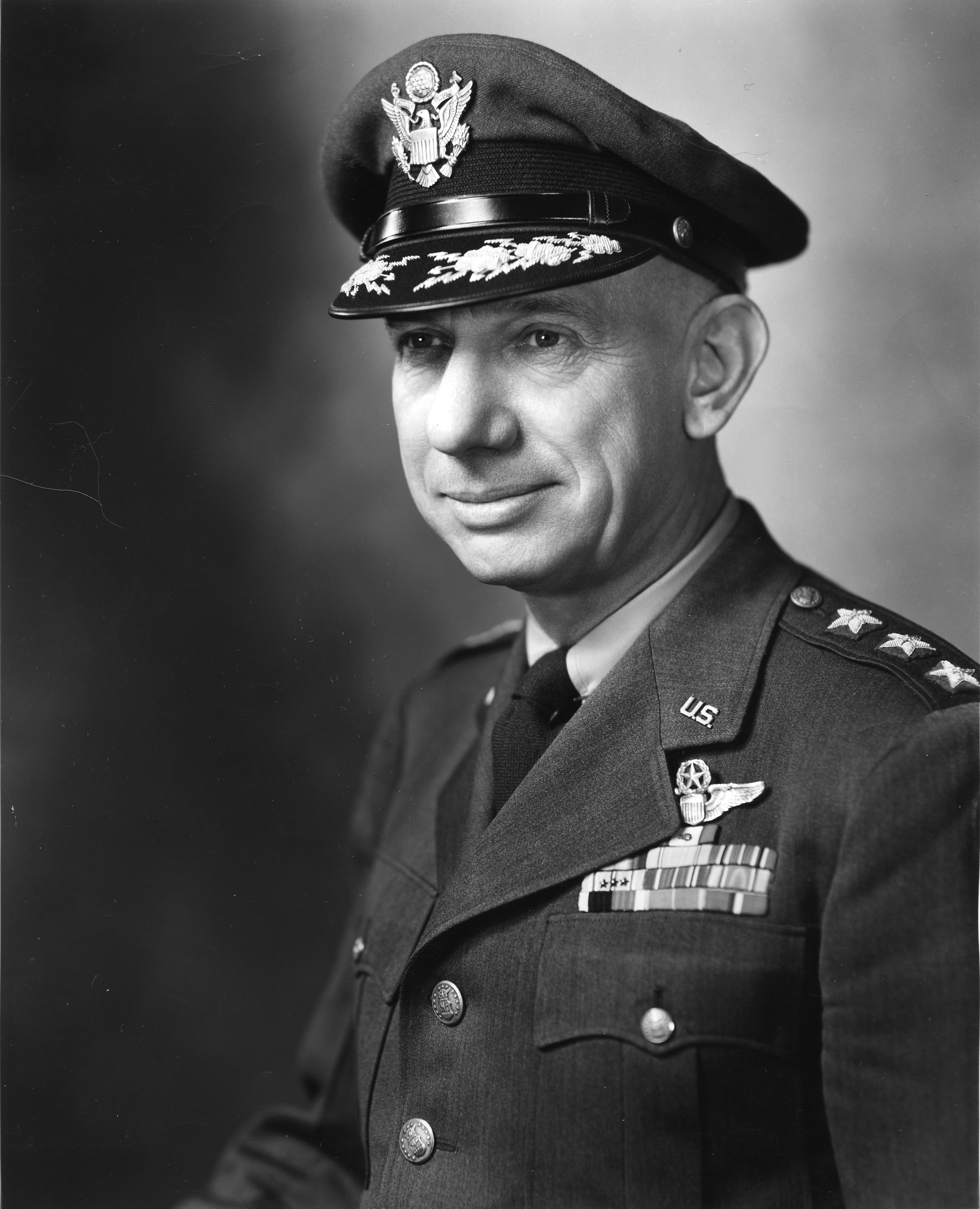
- Born: 12 August 1896; Denver, Colorado, United States
- Died: 20 September 1971 (aged 75); Solana Beach, California, United States
- Burial place: Arlington National Cemetery
- Military career
- Allegiance: United States
- Branch: United States Army; United States Air Force
- Service years: 1918–1947 (Army); 1947–1951 (Air Force)
- Rank: Lieutenant General
- Commands: Fifth Air Force; XX Bomber Command; 58th Bombardment Wing
- Conflicts: World War II; China Burma India Theater; Air raids on Japan; Occupation of Japan
- Awards: Distinguished Service Medal (2); Order of the British Empire

Kenneth Bonner Wolfe (12 August 1898 – 20 September 1971) was a lieutenant general in the United States Air Force who was responsible for the development and early operations of the Boeing B-29 Superfortress bomber. During World War II he commanded the XX Bomber Command in the China-Burma-India Theater, and later the Fifth Air Force on Okinawa.

== Early life ==
Kenneth Bonner Wolfe was born in Denver, Colorado, on 12 August 1898. He attended high school in Portland, Oregon and San Diego, California.

== World War I ==
On 12 January 1918, he enlisted in the Aviation Section of the Signal Corps. He received ground and flying training from the School of Military Aviation at the University of California, Berkeley, and at Park Field, Tennessee, and was commissioned as a temporary second lieutenant in the United States Army Air Service on 6 July 1918. Wolfe served briefly as flight instructor at Park Field before moving on to Souther Field, Georgia, as a flight instructor there. He returned to Park Field in January 1919, then went to Carlstrom Field, Florida in March. In July he became the officer in charge of flight training at Southern Field.

== Between the wars ==
Wolfe received a regular commission as a second lieutenant on 1 July 1920, and was promoted to first lieutenant the same day. He was the chief engineer officer at the Air Intermediate Depot in Americus, Georgia from January 1920 to November 1922. He then served as a flying instructor at Brooks Field, Texas. In May 1926 he went to Clark Field in the Philippine Islands as a plans and operations officer. He returned to the United States in August 1928 and, he was the engineering officer at Langley Field, Virginia until July 1930.

In 1930 and 1931, Wolfe attended the Air Corps Engineering School at Wright Field, Ohio, remaining there afterwards as the deputy chief, and later chief, of the Inspection Branch.He furthered his military education the Air Corps Tactical School at Maxwell Field, Alabama from August 1935 to June 1936, and then at the Command and General Staff School at Fort Leavenworth, Kansas, from which he graduated in 1937. He was the Air Corps representative at the Douglas Aircraft Company in El Segundo, California, from June 1937 to March 1939, after which he returned to Wright Field as assistant chief, of the production engineering section. He became its chief in February 1940.

== World War II ==
During World War II, Wolfe became responsible for the development of the Boeing B-29 Superfortress bomber. The B-29 made its first flight on 21 September 1942, but the project was set back when one of the three prototypes crashed on 18 February 1943, killing over thirty people, including test pilot Edmund T. Allen. At the time, the B-29 was the most expensive aircraft in the world, costing US$1.5 million (equivalent to $21 million in 2024) apiece.

In April 1943, the chief of the United States Army Air Forces (USAAF), General Henry H. Arnold, created a B-29 Special Project with Wolfe as chief. His role was soon expanded to not just development of the bomber, but organizing, training and equipping B-29 units for combat. Wolfe was also tasked with preparing operational plans for the bombing of Japan from bases in China, the only region under Allied control within B-29 range of Japan. He activated the 58th Bombardment Wing at Salina, Kansas, in June 1943, and became its commanding general. It was expected that 150 B-29s would be available by early 1944. To get around the lack of B-29s, Wolfe trained his men on Martin B-26 Marauder and Boeing B-17 Flying Fortress bombers. To direct his training program, Wolfe obtained Brigadier General LaVerne G. Saunders, who had commanded the 11th Bombardment Group in the Guadalcanal campaign.

The XX Bomber Command was activated on 27 November 1943, with Wolfe in command. In addition to the 58th Bombardment Wing with 112 B-29s, the XX Bomber Command also included aviation engineers to build the airfields and service units to maintain the B-29, making the wing self-sufficient commanding over 20,000 men. Wolfe arrived in New Delhi in India with the advance echelon of his staff on 13 January 1944. On 7 June, the XX Bomber Command struck Japan for the first time, bombing the steelworks at Yawata. Arnold pressed for more raids on Japan, but Wolfe was hamstrung by the logistical difficulties of operating from the bases in China. While it seemed like Wolfe, with his engineering background and thorough knowledge of the B-29, had been an excellent choice for getting the B-29 into service, Arnold felt he lacked the attributes required to lead it in combat. He was replaced by Brigadier General Curtis E. LeMay.

Wolfe was recalled to the United States. He returned to Wright Field as the head of the Materiel Command, with his primary tasks being to expedite improvements to the B-29 and increase its rate of production. In September 1944 the Materiel Command and Air Service Command were merged to become the Air Technical Service Command, and Wolfe became its chief of engineering and procurement. In April 1945 he moved to Washington, D.C., for temporary duty at USAAF headquarters.

== Post war ==
In August 1945, Wolfe became the chief of staff of the Fifth Air Force, which was based on the island of Okinawa. He became its commander in October, and oversaw its move to Nagoya, where it participated in the occupation of Japan. He returned to the United States in January 1948, and became the director of procurement and industrial mobilization planning at Air Materiel Command headquarters at Wright-Patterson Air Force Base. His final assignment, in September 1949, was as deputy chief of staff for materiel at United States Air Force headquarters in Washington, D.C. He retired from the Air Force on 30 June 1951 with the rank of lieutenant general.

== Later life ==
After his retirement from the Air Force, Wolfe became president of the Oerlikon Tool and Arms Corporation of America. In 1956 he joined the Garrett Corporation in Los Angeles as a vice president. He was elected senior vice president and a director in 1963. He retired in 1966 but continued to serve as a consultant.

Wolfe died at his home in Solana Beach, California, on 20 September 1971, and was buried in Arlington National Cemetery. He was survived by his wife, Margaret, and daughter, Beverly. His papers are held by the Air Force Historical Research Agency.

== Dates of rank ==
Insignia	Rank	Component	Date	Reference
	Private first class	Aviation Section, Signal Corps	12 January 1918	
	Second lieutenant	United States Army Air Service (National Army	6 July 1918	
	Second lieutenant	United States Army Air Service	1 July 1920	
	First lieutenant	United States Army Air Service	1 July 1920	
	Captain	United States Army Air Corps	1 December 1933	
	Major (temporary)	United States Army Air Corps	2 March 1935	
	Captain (reverted)	United States Army Air Corps	21 August 1935	
	Major (temporary)	United States Army Air Corps	26 August 1936	
	Major	United States Army Air Corps	1 July 1940	
	Lieutenant Colonel (temporary)	United States Army Air Corps	15 March 1941	
	Lieutenant Colonel	Army of the United States	15 September 1941	
	Colonel (temporary)	Army of the United States	5 January 1942	
	Brigadier general	Army of the United States	1 March 1942	
	Lieutenant Colonel	United States Army Air Corps	4 November 1942	
	Major general	Army of the United States	8 November 1944	
	Brigadier general	United States Air Force	28 February 1947	
	Major general	United States Air Force	19 February 1948	
	Lieutenant general (temporary)	United States Air Force	16 September 1949	
	Lieutenant general	Retired	30 June 1951	
