= 58th Air Division =

Inactive unit of the US Air Force

58th Air Division (Defense)
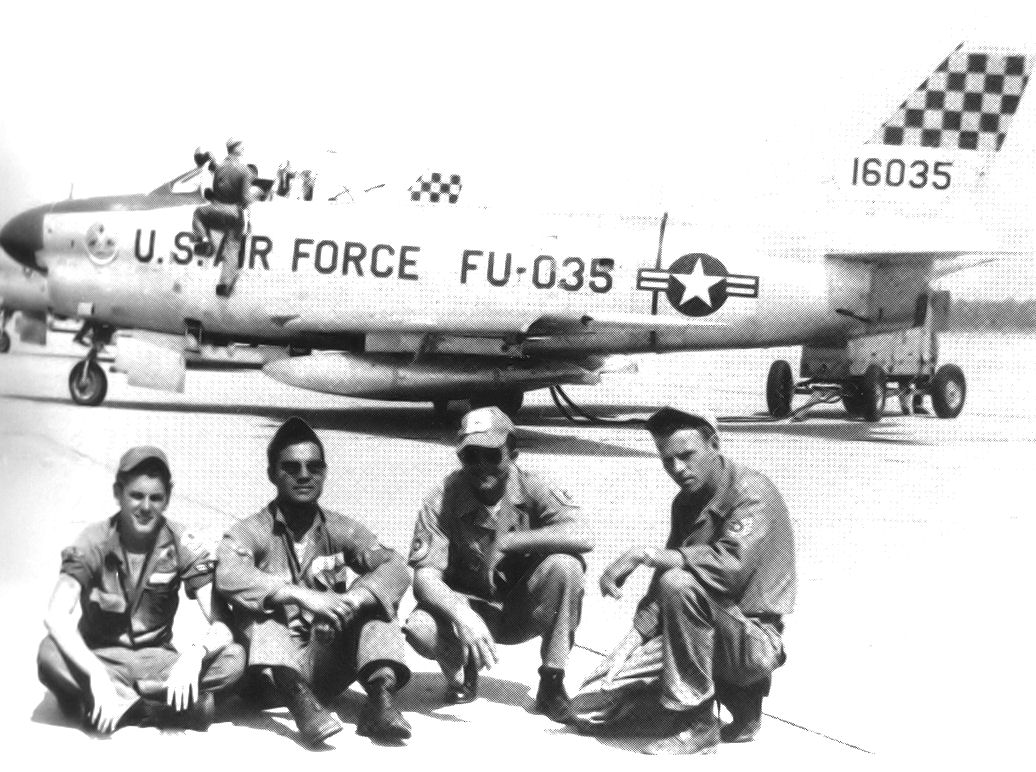
- 87th Fighter-Interceptor Squadron F-86D at Lockbourne AFB (Note: Aircraft is North American F-86D-30-NA Sabre Serial 51-6035)
- Active: 1943–1944; 1945–1948; 1955–1959
- Country: United States
- Branch: United States Air Force
- Role: Command of air defense forces
- Engagements: World War II; Pacific Theater; Bombing of Bangkok in World War II

Insignia
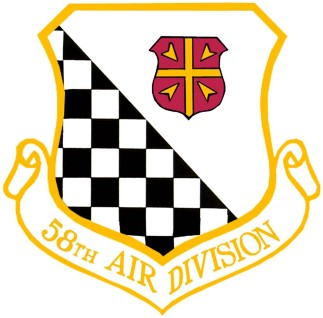
- 58th Air Division emblem (Note: Approved 11 January 1956.)

The 58th Air Division (58th AD) is an inactive United States Air Force unit. Its last assignment was with Air Defense Command, based at Wright Patterson Air Force Base, Ohio. It was inactivated on 1 February 1959.

== History ==
=== World War II ===
==== B-29 development ====
The 58th Bombardment Operational Training Wing (Heavy) was constituted on 22 April and activated on 1 May 1943 at Smoky Hill AAF, Kansas. The wing's mission was to train the first Boeing B-29 Superfortress aircrews and help prepare the new aircraft for operational combat duty. On 1 June 1943 the wing was reassigned to the Boeing manufacturing plant at Marietta Army Air Field, Georgia in advance of delivery of the first YB-29 prototypes. By July, seven YB-29s had been delivered to the USAAF and were used to equip new training squadrons of the 472d Bombardment Group, the first operational group of the 58th Bomb Wing.

In August 1943, it was decided that 58th Bombardment Wing would be stationed in the China Burma India Theatre by the end of 1943 and would begin attacking Japanese home island targets by flying out of bases in China. It would be commanded by General Kenneth B. Wolfe and would consist of four operational groups of B-29s. It was envisaged that once sufficient numbers of B-29s were available, Japan could be forced out of the war within six months by the destruction of her war industries, making a costly seaborne invasion of the home islands unnecessary. It was projected that such a program could defeat Japan by mid-1945.

On 15 September 1943, the headquarters of the 58th BW was moved to Smoky Hill AAF, with some of its groups near the Wichita factory. The 58th Bomb Wing however, initially had 5 groups (the 40th, 444th, 462d, 468th, and 472d Bombardment Groups). The 40th was reassigned from Sixth Air Force in the Caribbean, the others were newly formed. The 472d Group was destined to remain at Smoky Hill Field as an operational training unit (OTU), and the others were to be deployed to India.

President Roosevelt wanted the B-29 bombing raids against Japan to start by January 1944. However, delays in the B-29 program forced General Arnold to admit to the President that the bombing campaign against Japan could not begin until May 1944 at the earliest.

The crew training program was one of the more difficult aspects of the entire B-29 program. Because of the complexity of the B-29 aircraft, a lengthy process of crew integration was required before combat operations could begin. There was no time to start from scratch, so volunteers were called for from B-24 crews returning from operations in Europe and North Africa. The crews of the B-29 needed a degree of specialist training that was not required for crews of other, less complex Boeing B-17 Flying Fortress or Consolidated B-24 Liberator aircraft. It usually took 27 weeks to train a pilot, 15 to train a navigator, and 12 to train a gunner. The complexity of the B-29 was such that a lengthy process of crew integration had to take place before combat deployment could begin.

Although a total of 97 B-29s had been produced by the beginning of 1944, only 16 of the aircraft were really airworthy. Most of the others were in AAF modification centers, located near the Bell-Marietta and Martin-Omaha plants and at air bases in Kansas, undergoing a series of modifications and changes necessitated by the lessons of air combat over Europe. At that time, much of the equipment and components of the Superfortress had still not been perfected, and rather than delay production by stopping the assembly lines to incorporate modifications and add new equipment, it was decided to let the first production airplanes leave the lines at Wichita deficient in combat readiness and deliver them to these USAAF modification centers to bring them up to combat standards.

Crews began to arrive at Kansas bases in November 1943, but few bombers were ready to receive them. At that time, there was only one Superfortress for every twelve crews, and most crews had to train on Martin Martin B-26 Marauders or Boeing B-17 Flying Fortresses. By the end of December, only 67 pilots had managed to fly a B-29 and few crews had been brought together as a complete team. Many gunners did not even see their first B-29 until early 1944.

It was not until December 1943 that the decision not to use the B-29 against Germany was finally made, and to concentrate the B-29 exclusively against Japan. However, in early 1944, the B-29s were still not ready to begin Roosevelt's promised offensive against Japan Most of the B-29s were still held up at the modification centers, awaiting conversion to full combat readiness. By March 1944, the B-29 modification program had fallen into complete chaos, with absolutely no bombers being considered as combat ready. The program was seriously hampered by the need to work in the open air in inclement weather, by delays in acquiring the necessary tools and support equipment, and by the USAAF's general lack of experience with the B-29.

==== Operations in India and Tinian ====
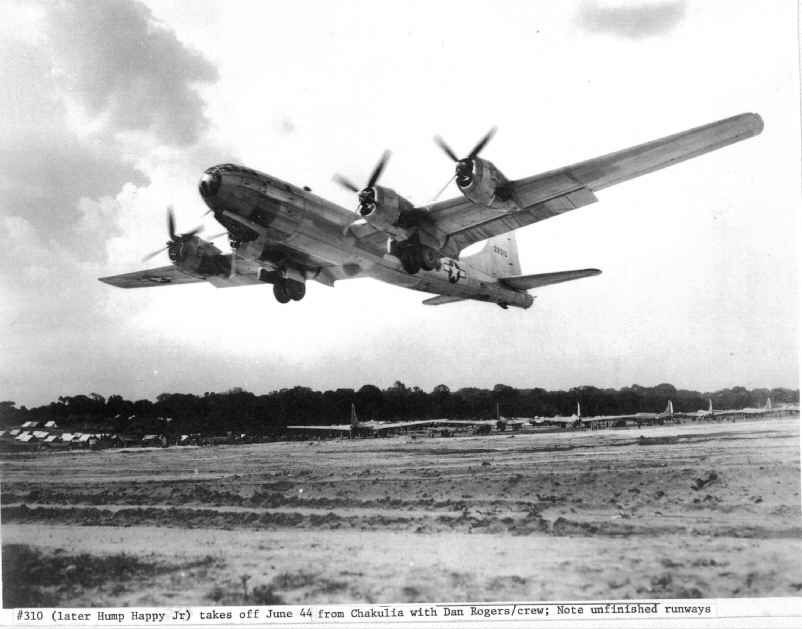
B-29 taking off from Chakulia, June 1944 (Note: Aircraft is Serial 42-6310)

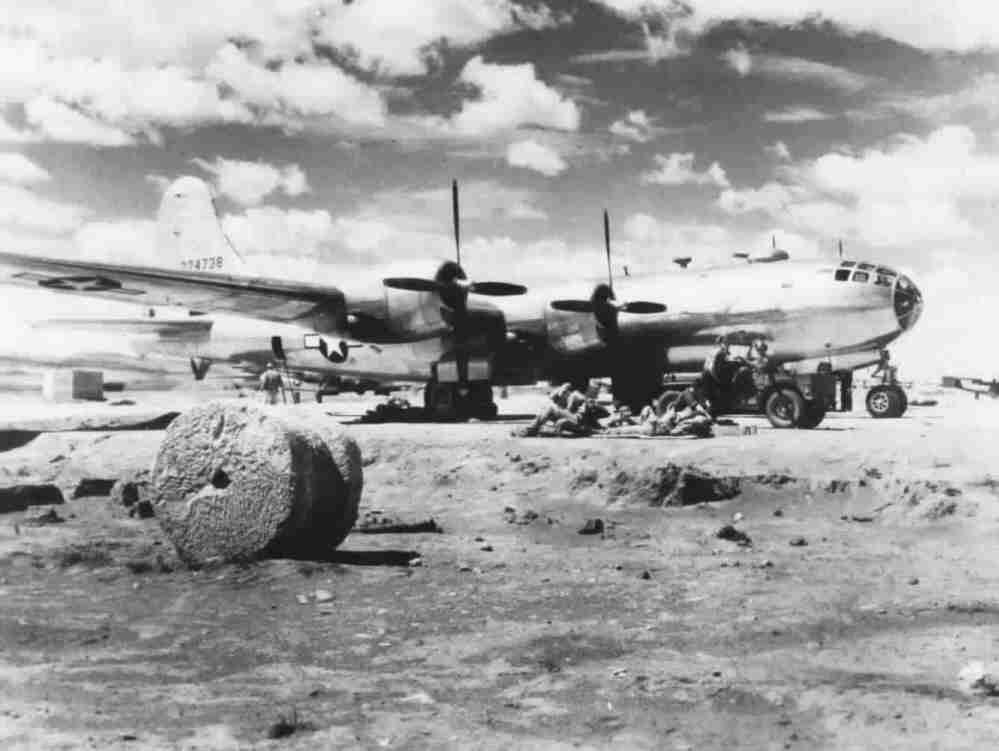
B-29 on an unfinished airfield in China, 1944 (Note: Aircraft is Serial 42-74738)

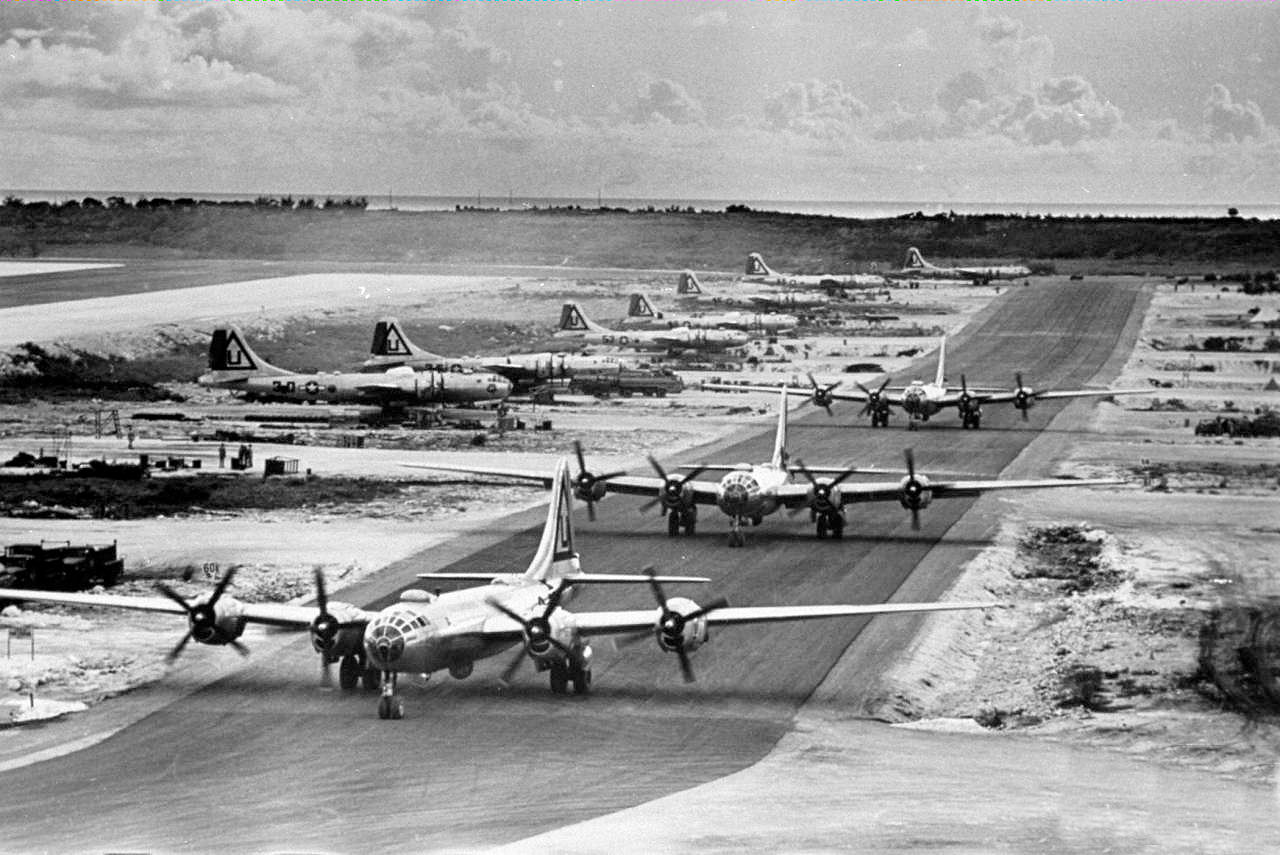
B-29s of the 462d Bomb Group West Field, Tinian

After much effort, the headquarters of the XX Bomber Command had been established at the former RAF Kharagpur Airfield, India on 28 March 1944 under the command of General Wolfe. The first B-29 reached its base in India on 2 April 1944. In India, existing airfields at Kharagpur, Chakulia, Piardoba and Dudkhundi had been converted for B-29 use. All of these bases were located in southern Bengal and were not far from port facilities at Calcutta. All of these bases had originally been established in 1942–43 for Consolidated B-24 Liberators. The conditions at these bases were poor, and the runways were still in the process of being lengthened when the first B-29s arrived. The headquarters of the 58th BW, together with the four squadrons of the 40th Bombardment Group (the 25th 44th, 45th, and 395th) were assigned to the airfield at Chakulia, the first planes arriving there on 2 April 1944. The Headquarters was moved to Kharagpur airfield on 23 April. The 444th Bombardment Group (676th, 677th, 678th and 679th Squadrons) went to Charra, arriving there on 11 April. The 462d Bombardment Group (768th, 769th, 770th, and 771st squadrons) to Piardoba, arriving there on 7 April. The 468th Bombardment Group (792nd, 793rd, 794th and 795th Squadrons) arrived at Kharagpur on 13 April. The 444th Bombardment Group later moved to a permanent airfield at Dudhkundi, leaving Charra to become a transport base for the C-87s and C-46s which would support the effort.

On 4 April 1944, a special strategic formation, the Twentieth Air Force, was established, which would carry out the aerial assault against Japan. This was done at the insistence of General Arnold himself, mainly to avoid having the B-29s being diverted to tactical missions under pressure from CBI theatre commanders. Twentieth Air Force would be commanded by General Arnold himself at Joint Chiefs of Staff level. It would be completely autonomous and their B-29s would be completely independent of other command structures and would be dedicated exclusively against strategic targets in Japan. The operational vehicle was to be the 58th Bombardment Wing (Very Heavy) of XX Bomber Command.

The primary flaw in flying from bases in China was that all the supplies of fuel, bombs, and spares needed to support the forward bases in China had to be flown in from India over the Hump, since Japanese control of the seas around the Chinese coast made seaborne supply of China impossible.

The first B-29 bombing raid took place on 5 June 1944. Led by General Saunders himself, 98 B-29s took off from bases in eastern India to attack the Makasan railroad yards at Bangkok, Thailand. This involved a 2261-mile round trip, the longest bombing mission yet attempted during the war. Other missions followed, but the command could launch only about one sortie a month per aircraft against targets in Japan. "For every Superfortress combat mission, the command flew an average of six B 29 round-trip cargo missions over the Hump. Even after the Air Transport Command took over the logistical supply of the B 29 bases in China at the end of 1944, enough fuel and bombs never seemed to reach Chengtu."

On 13 July 1944, General Saunders combined the personnel of the 58th Wing into headquarters, XX Bomber Command, attaching the wing's personnel to the appropriate division of the command's staff. Although the wing continued to exist as a paper unit, it had no further operational functions in India.

By late 1944, it was becoming apparent that B-29 operations against Japan staged out of bases in Chengtu were far too expensive in men and materials and would have to be stopped. In December 1944, the Joint Chiefs of Staff made the decision that the 58th Bombardment Wing's B-29s would be moved to newly captured bases in the Marianas in the central Pacific. The 58th Bomb Wing flew its last operations from India and China on 8 February 1945.

The wing moved to Tinian in early 1945 and was reassigned to the XXI Bomber Command on 29 March. The wing continued bombardment operations against Japan. Its units made daylight attacks from high altitudes on strategic targets, participated in incendiary raids on urban areas, and dropped mines in Japanese shipping lanes. After the Japanese surrender, groups of the 58th Bomb Wing dropped food and supplies to Allied prisoners of war in Japan, Korea, and Formosa, and took part in show of force missions.

=== Strategic Air Command ===
The 58th Bomb Wing returned to the United States late in 1945, being assigned to March Field, California. It was reassigned to Continental Air Forces, later Strategic Air Command, on 21 March 1946. The newly formed Strategic Air Command was ill-equipped. it had inherited the headquarters buildings previously occupied by the Continental Air Forces at Bolling Field in Washington, D.C., and some of "operational assets" that had been assigned to it. On 7 June 1946, Eighth Air Force was relocated to MacDill Field, Florida, from Okinawa and assigned as one of SAC's two Numbered Air Forces, (the other being Fifteenth Air Force) but it was only moved on paper; it did not involve the moving personnel or equipment. The 58th Bomb Wing was assigned to Eighth Air Force. In fact, Eighth Air Force headquarters were manned chiefly by personnel from the 58th Bombardment Wing stationed at Fort Worth Army Air Field, Texas.

SAC's bomb wings were drastically undermanned and under equipped. Not all had aircraft. At the close of 1946, demobilization was in full swing and few were fully equipped and manned. The entire Strategic Air Command had a total of 148 bombers, all B-29s. Virtually all were equipped to drop conventional bombs, as the United States then had only nine Atomic Bombs and only a few B-29s of the 509th Group to deliver them if necessary. The Truman Administration was determined to balance the national budget. It seemed as if America's vast military power was no longer needed, so appropriations were drastically slashed. One unit after another was disbanded. The command staff and all personnel of the wing were eliminated on 1 November 1946 and the organization was reduced to a paper unit. For two years the wing remained in this status until the 58th Bomb Wing was inactivated on 16 October 1948.

=== Air Defense Command ===
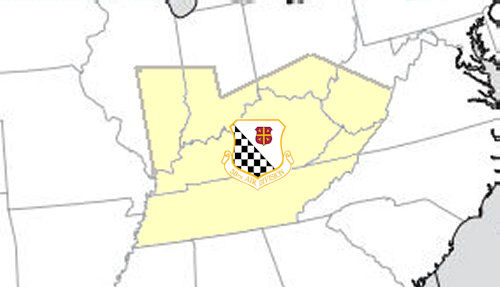
58th AD Air Defense Command AOR 1955–1959

"Inactive for seven years, the 58th was reactivated as the 58th Air Division (Defense) in September 1955 and assumed responsibility for the defense of parts of Illinois, Indiana, West Virginia, Kentucky, Tennessee, Mississippi, Alabama, and Georgia, and supported operations, when necessary, of other commands. It supervised training programs for its subordinate units and supported exercises such as 'Hour Hand, Blue Light, Red Cap, Iron Ba', and Surefire."

== Lineage ==
- Established as the 58th Bombardment Operational Training Wing (Heavy) on 22 April 1943

Activated on 1 May 1943
Redesignated 58th Bombardment Wing (Heavy) on 12 July 1943
Redesignated 58th Bombardment Wing, Very Heavy on 19 November 1943
Redesignated 58th Bombardment Wing, Very Heavy, Special on 13 January 1944
Disbanded on 12 October 1944.

- Reestablished as 58th Bombardment Wing, Very Heavy' on 1 February 1945

Activated on 8 February 1945
Redesignated 58th Air Division, Bombardment on 16 April 1948
Inactivated on 16 October 1948

- Redesignated 58th Air Division (Defense) on 3 May 1955

Activated on 8 September 1955
Inactivated on 1 February 1959

=== Assignments ===
- Second Air Force, 1 May 1943
- II Bomber Command, 15 May 1943
- United States Army Air Forces, 8 June 1943
- Second Air Force, 15 October 1943
- XX Bomber Command, 20 November 1943
- Twentieth Air Force, 29 June – 12 October 1944
- XX Bomber Command, 8 February 1945
- XXI Bomber Command, 29 March 1945
- Twentieth Air Force, 16 July 1945
- Army Service Forces, Port of Embarkation, c. 15 November 1945
- Fourth Air Force, 7 December 1945
- Second Air Force, 29 March 1946
- Fifteenth Air Force, 31 March 1946
- Eighth Air Force, 1 November 1946
- Strategic Air Command, 1 March – 16 October 1948
- Eastern Air Defense Force, 8 September 1955 – 1 February 1959

=== Components ===
==== Groups ====
- 25th Air Service Group
- 28th Air Service Group
- 40th Bombardment Group: 1 May 1943 – 12 October 1944; 8 February 1945 – 1 October 1946
- 86th Air Service Group
- 87th Air Service Group
- 355th Fighter Group: 1 March 1956 – 8 January 1958

McGhee Tyson Airport, Tennessee

- 444th Bombardment Group: 1 August 1943 – 12 October 1944; 8 February 1945 – 31 March 1946
- 462d Bombardment Group: 1 July 1943 – 12 October 1944; 8 February 1945 – 31 March 1946
- 468th Bombardment Group: 1 August 1943 – 12 October 1944; 8 February 1945 – 31 March 1946
- 472d Bombardment Group: 1 September 1943 – 1 April 1944

==== Squadrons ====
Fighter squadrons

- 56th Fighter-Interceptor Squadron: 1 March 1956 – 1 September 1958

Wright-Patterson Air Force Base Ohio (F-86D/L)

- 87th Fighter-Interceptor Squadron: 8 April 1956 – 1 September 1958

Lockbourne Air Force Base Ohio (F-89H/J)

- 319th Fighter-Interceptor Squadron: 1 March 1956 – 1 September 1958

Bunker Hill Air Force Base Indiana (F-94C/J)

Radar squadrons

- 704th Aircraft Control and Warning Squadron

Carmi Air Force Station, Illinois, 1 March 1956 – 1 November 1957

- 782d Aircraft Control and Warning Squadron

Rockville Air Force Station, Indiana, 1 March 1956 – 1 September 1958

- 783d Aircraft Control and Warning Squadron

Guthrie Air Force Station, West Virginia, 1 March 1956 – 1 September 1958

- 784th Aircraft Control and Warning Squadron

Snow Mountain Air Force Station, Kentucky, 1 March 1956 – 1 September 1958

- 799th Aircraft Control and Warning Squadron

Joelton Air Force Station, Tennessee, 1 October 1956 – 1 September 1958

- 809th Aircraft Control and Warning Squadron

Owingsville Air Force Station, Kentucky, 1 March 1956 – 30 November 1957

- 867th Aircraft Control and Warning Squadron

Flintstone Air Force Station, Georgia, 1 March 1956 – 1 September 1958

=== Stations ===
- Smoky Hill Army Air Field, Kansas, 1 May 1943
- Marietta Army Air Field, Georgia, 15 June 1943
- Smoky Hill Army Air Field, Kansas, 15 September 1943 – 12 March 1944
- Chakulia Airfield, India, 2 April 1944
- Kharagpur Airfield, India, 23 April – 12 October 1944
- Hijli Base Area, India, 8 – 24 February 1945
- West Field, 29 March-15 Nov 1945
- March Field, California, 2 December 1945
- Fort Worth Army Air Field, Texas, 9 May 1946
- Andrews Air Force Base, Maryland, 1 March – 16 October 1948
- Wright Patterson Air Force Base, Ohio, 8 September 1955 – 1 February 1959

=== Aircraft ===
- Boeing B-29 Superfortress, 1943–1944, 1945–1946
- North American F-86 Sabre, 1955–1958
- Northrop F-89 Scorpion, 1956–1958
- Lockheed F-94 Starfire, 1956–1957

== See also ==
- List of USAF Aerospace Defense Command General Surveillance Radar Stations
- Aerospace Defense Command Fighter Squadrons
- List of United States Air Force air divisions
