= XX Bomber Command =

1941-1948 United States Air Force operational command

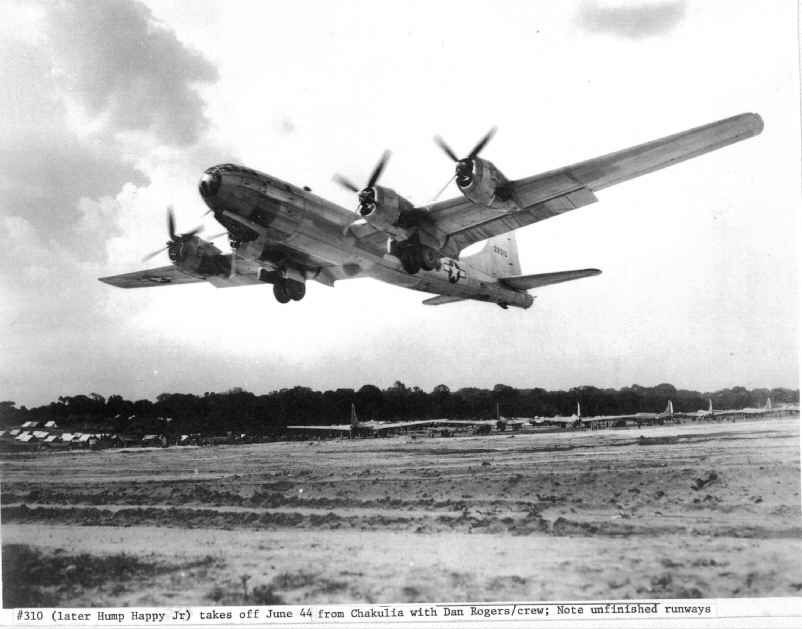
- 40th Bombardment Group B-29 taking off from Chakulia Airfield (Note: Aircraft is Boeing B-29-BW Superfortress, serial 42-6310. Taken in June 1944.)
- Active: 1943–1945
- Country: United States
- Branch: United States Army Air Forces
- Role: Command of strategic bomber units
- Part of: Twentieth Air Force
- Engagements: China-Burma-India Theater; Pacific Theater of Operations

Insignia
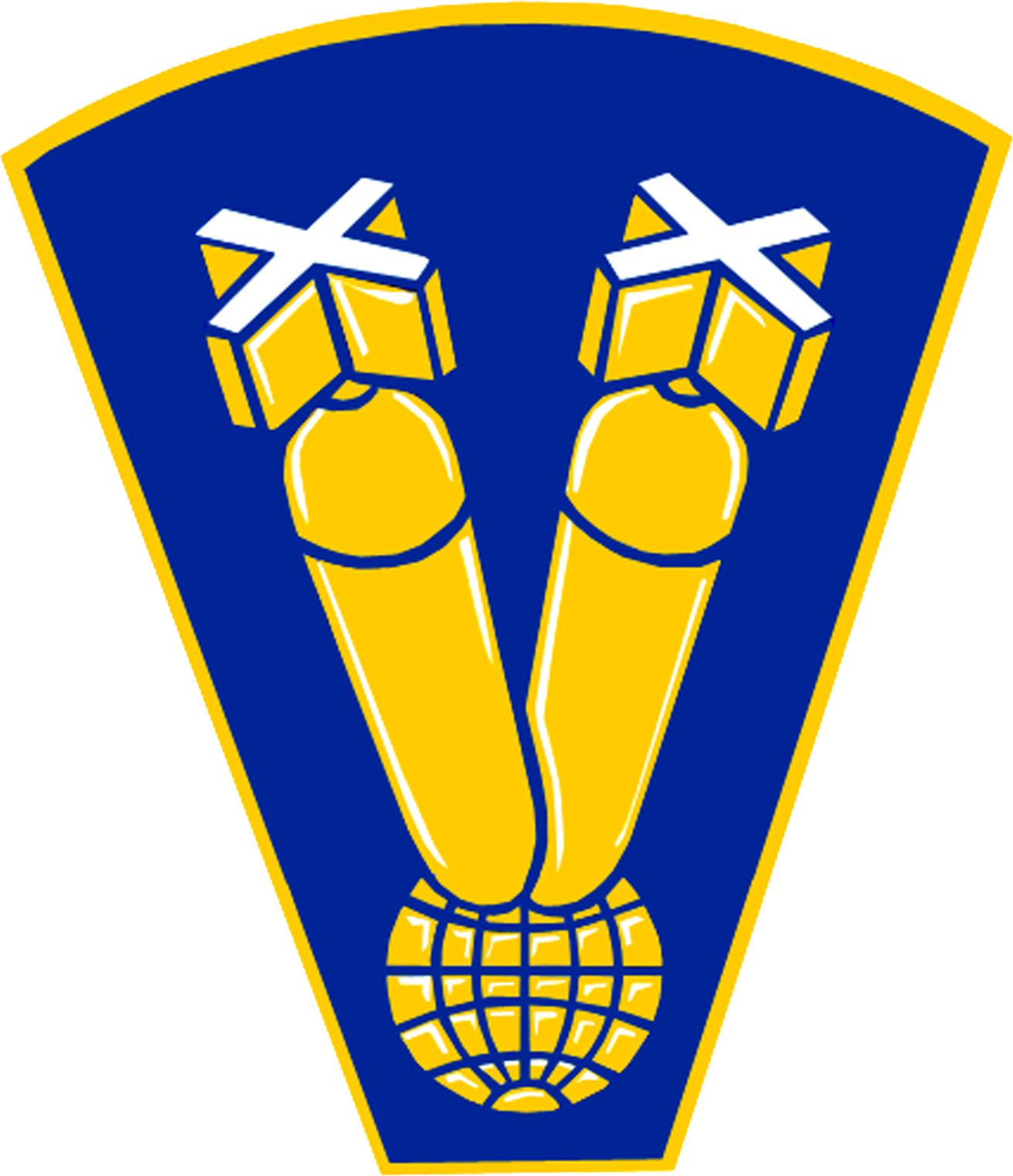
- XX Bomber Command emblem (Note: Approved 20 March 1945.)

The XX Bomber Command was a United States Army Air Forces bomber formation. Its last assignment was with Twentieth Air Force, based on Okinawa. It was inactivated on 16 July 1945.

== History ==
The idea of basing Boeing B-29 Superfortresses in China first surfaced at the Casablanca Conference in January 1943. While planners assessed this option, the Anglo-American Combined Chiefs of Staff, meeting in Quebec in August, authorized a central Pacific drive that included the seizure of the Marianas. Not only were the Marianas closer to Tokyo, but once in Allied hands they could be supplied and defended more easily than other sites. In September, Combined Chiefs of Staff planners concluded that B-29s in China would be plagued by logistical problems. However, President Franklin D. Roosevelt decided in favor of the China bases because he was impatient to bomb Japan and wished to bolster the Chinese war effort. At the Sextant Conference in Cairo at the end of the year, he promised Chiang Kai-shek that the very heavy bombers would be coming to his country. General Arnold supported that decision as a temporary expedient, but still preferred strategic missions against Japan from the Marianas, once bases there were available.

Advance Army Air Forces echelons arrived in India in December 1943 to organize the building of airfields in India and China. Thousands of Indians labored to construct four permanent bases in eastern India around Kharagpur. Meanwhile, 1,000 miles (1,600 km) to the northeast, across the Himalayan mountains, about 350,000 Chinese workers toiled to build four staging bases in western China near Chengdu. By April 1944, eight B-29 airfields were available in Asia.

To avoid the risk that B-29s might be wasted by theater commanders on the battlefields when they would be much more useful against the Japanese home islands, the Joint Chiefs of Staff (JCS) agreed in April 1944 to establish the Twentieth Air Force as a non-theater command controlled directly by the JCS, and approved Operation Matterhorn, a plan for bombing Japanese strategic targets with B–29s based in China. The B-29s would double as transports to carry their own fuel and cargo requirements over The Hump from India. Acting as executive agent for the JCS and with the approval of Roosevelt, Arnold named himself commander of the Twentieth Air Force. His Air Planner, Brigadier general Haywood S. Hansell served as its chief of staff and the remainder of the Air Staff at Headquarters AAF performed duplicate duties as the staff of the Twentieth. Centralized control of the Superfortresses from Washington marked the recognition of the B-29 as a strategic weapon that transcended theaters and services.

=== China campaign ===
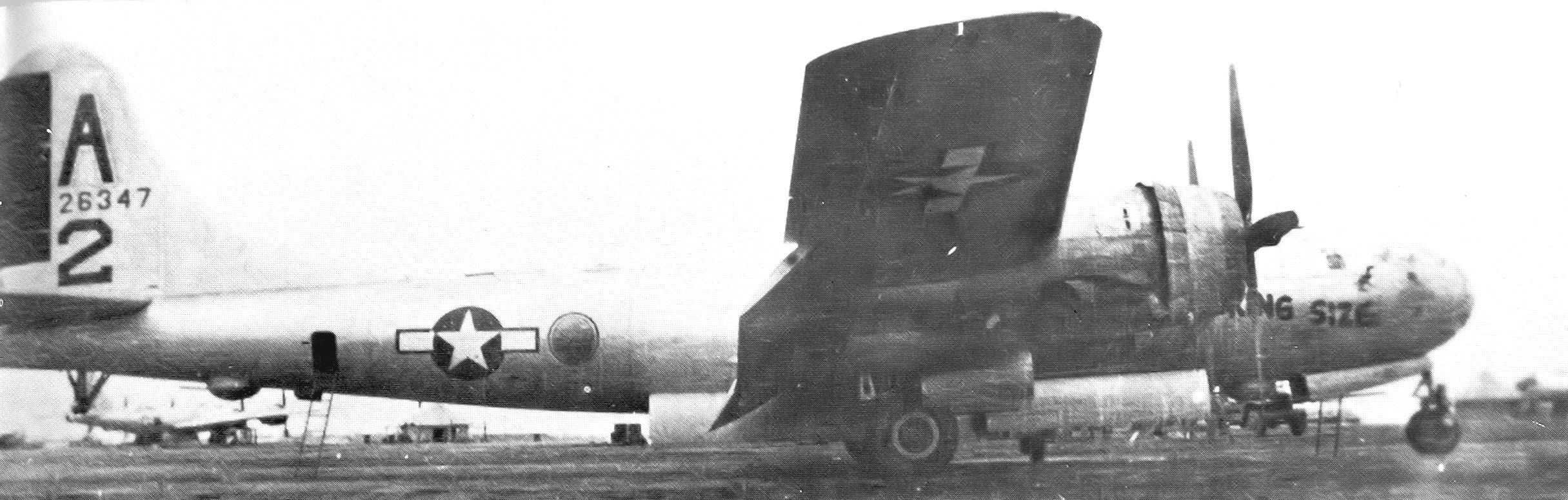
462d Bombardment Group Boeing B-29 "King Size" at Piardoba Airfield (Note: Aircraft is Boeing B-29-10-BW Superfortress, serial 42-6347 in June 1944. This was one of the forty-seven B-29s that completed the first combat mission over Japan, 15 June 1944.)

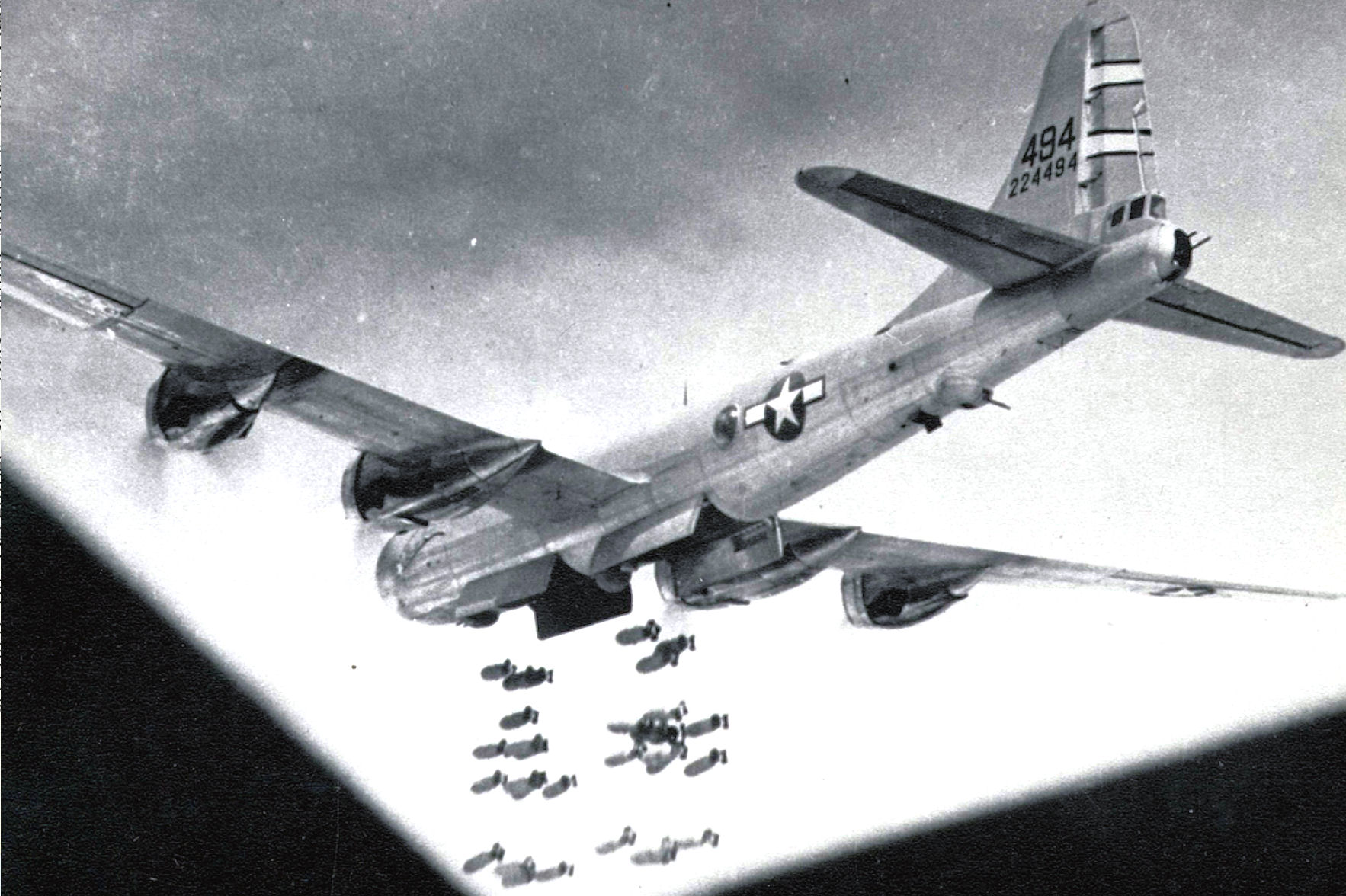
468th Bombardment Group B-29, "Mary Ann" attacking Hatto, Formosa on 18 October 1944 with high-explosive bombs. (Note: Aircraft is Boeing B-29-30-BW Superfortress, serial 42-24494 of the 792d Bombardment Squadron.)

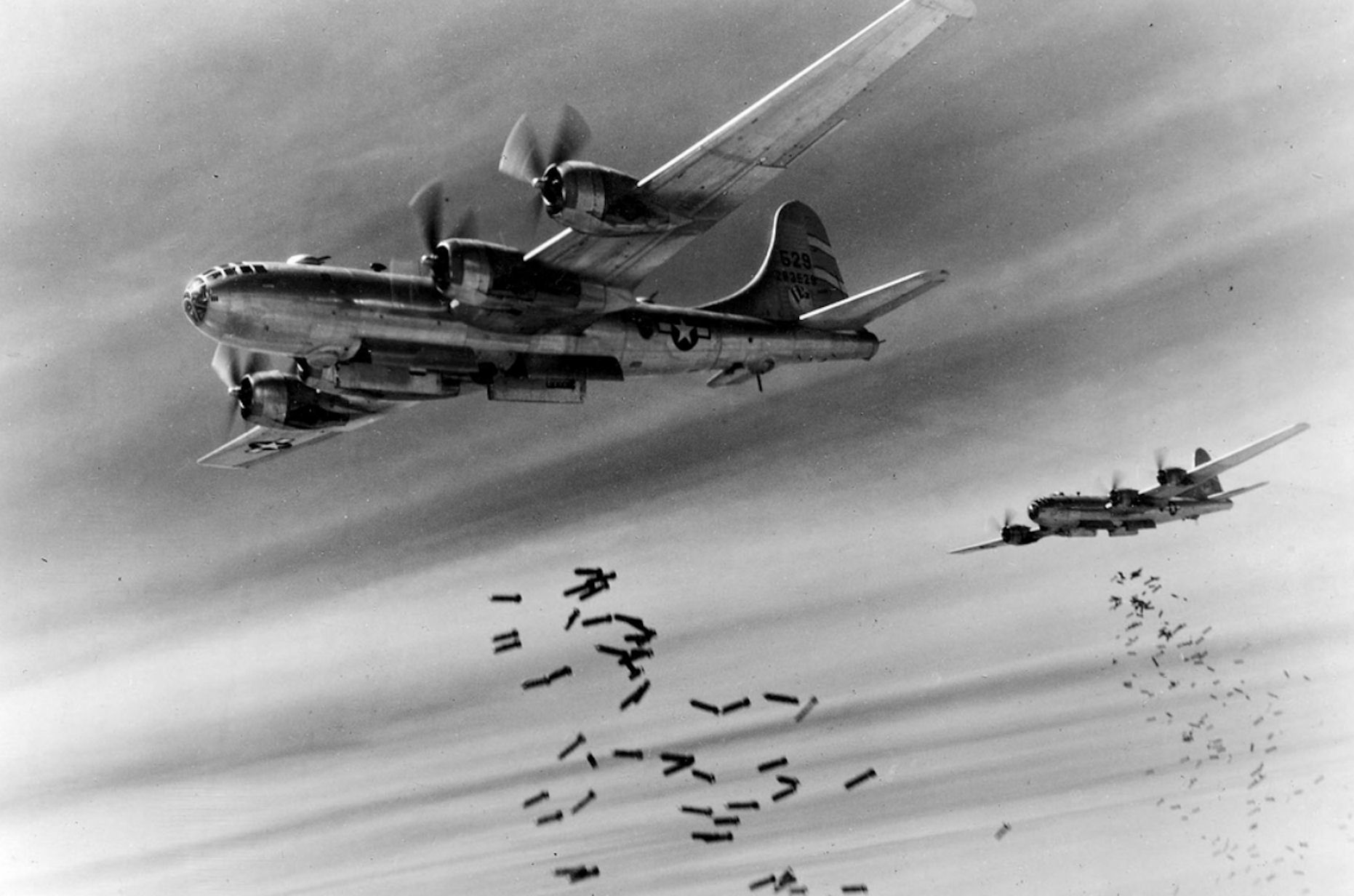
468th Bombardment Group Boeing B-29s attacking Rangoon Burma, 22 March 1945

That same month, the first B-29s arrived in India, having flown across the Atlantic Ocean, North Africa, Arabia, and Persia. Accompanying them was Major general Kenneth B. Wolfe, the new commander of the XX Bomber Command, which had been reassigned from the Second Air Force as the operational component of the Twentieth Air Force. The 58th Bombardment Wing headquarters also arrived in India during the spring of 1944. The 58th was the only wing to serve on the Asian mainland under the XX Bomber Command.

A committee of operations analysts who advised the JCS and the Twentieth Air Force on targets recommended Superfortress attacks on coke ovens and steel factories in Manchuria and Kyūshū. Shutting down these key industries would severely cripple the enemy's war effort. Also on the target list were important enemy harbor facilities and aircraft factories. Wolfe launched the first B–29 Superfortress combat mission on 5 June 1944, against Japanese railroad facilities at Bangkok, Thailand, about 1,000 miles away. Of the 98 bombers that took off from India, 77 hit their targets, dropping 368 tons of bombs. Encouraged by the results, XX Bomber Command prepared for the first raids against Japan.

On 15 June 1944, 68 B-29s took off at night from staging bases at Chengdu to bomb the Imperial Iron and Steel Works at Yawata on Kyūshū, more than 1,500 miles (2,400 km) away. This attack, the first raid on the Japanese home islands since the Doolittle Raid of April 1942, marked the beginning of the strategic bombardment campaign against Japan. Like the Doolittle raid, it achieved little physical destruction. Only 47 of the B–29s hit the target area; four aborted with mechanical problems, four crashed, six jettisoned their bombs because of mechanical difficulties, and others bombed secondary targets or targets of opportunity. Only one B–29 was lost to enemy aircraft.

The second full-scale strike did not occur until 7 July 1944. By then, Arnold, impatient with Wolfe's progress, had replaced him temporarily with Brigadier general LaVerne G. Saunders, until Major general Curtis E. LeMay could arrive from Europe to assume permanent command. The three-week delay between the first and second missions reflected serious problems that prevented a sustained strategic bombing campaign from China against Japan. Each B–29 mission consumed tremendous quantities of fuel and bombs, which had to be shuttled from India to the Chinese bases over the Himalayas, the world's highest mountain range. For every Superfortress combat mission, the command flew an average of six B–29 round-trip cargo missions over the Hump. Even after the Air Transport Command took over the logistical supply of the B–29 bases in China at the end of 1944, enough fuel and bombs never seemed to reach Chengdu.

Range presented another problem. Tokyo, in eastern Honshū, lay more than 2,000 miles (3,200 km) from the Chinese staging bases, out of reach of the B–29s. Kyūshū, in southwestern Japan, was the only one of the major home islands within the 1,600 miles (2,600 km) combat radius of the Superfortress. Targets in South East Asia also involved lengthy flights, with the Operation Boomerang raid which was conducted against Palembang on 10/11 August requiring a round trip of 3,855 miles (6,204 km).

The B-29 still suffered mechanical problems that grounded some aircraft and forced others to turn back before dropping their bombs. Even those B–29s that reached the target area often had difficulty in hitting the objective, partly because of extensive cloud cover or high winds. Larger formations could have helped compensate for inaccurate bombing, but Saunders did not have enough B–29s to dispatch large formations. Also, the Twentieth Air Force periodically diverted the Superfortresses from strategic targets to support theater commanders in Southeast Asia and the southwestern Pacific. For these reasons, the XX Bomber Command and the B–29s largely failed to fulfill their strategic promise.

On 20 August, LeMay arrived to breathe new energy into the XX Bomber Command. The former Eighth Air Force group and wing commander had achieved remarkable success with strategic bombing operations in Europe, testing new concepts such as stagger formations, the combat box, and straight-and-level bombing runs. The youngest two-star general in the Army Air Forces had also revised tactics, tightened and expanded formations, and enhanced training for greater bombing precision. He inaugurated a lead-crew training school so that formations could learn to drop as a unit on cue from the aircraft designated as the lead ship.

During his first two months at XX Bomber Command, LeMay had little more success than Wolfe or Saunders. The command continued to average only about one sortie a month per aircraft against Japan's home islands. When Douglas MacArthur invaded the Philippines in October 1944, LeMay diverted his B-29s from bombing Japanese steel facilities to striking enemy aircraft factories and bases in Formosa, Kyūshū, and Manchuria.

Meanwhile, LeMay gained the support of Communist leader Mao Zedong, who controlled parts of northern China. Willing to help against a common enemy, Mao agreed to assist downed American airmen and to locate in northern China a weather station that would provide better forecasts for the XX Bomber Command's raids on the Japanese in Manchuria and Kyūshū. Hoping to gain American recognition of his own regime, Mao suggested that the Americans set up B–29 bases in northern China like those in Chiang Kai-shek's area of control in southern China. LeMay declined, however, because he found it difficult enough to supply the airfields at Chengdu.

LeMay continued to experiment with new technologies and tactics and soon imported to China the incendiary weapons being used by the British against Germany. In late 1944, the Japanese Operation Ichi-Go offensive in China probed toward the B–29 and Air Transport Command bases around Chengdu and Kunming. To slow the enemy advance, Major general Claire L. Chennault of the Fourteenth Air Force asked for raids on Japanese supplies at Hankow, and the JCS directed LeMay to hit the city with firebombs. On 18 December, LeMay launched the fire raid, sending 84 B–29s in at medium altitude with five hundred tons of incendiary bombs. The attack left Hankow burning for three days, proving the effectiveness of incendiary weapons against the predominantly wooden architecture of the Far East.

By late 1944, American bombers were raiding Japan from the recently captured Marianas, making operations from the vulnerable and logistically impractical China bases unnecessary. In January 1945, XX Bomber Command abandoned its bases in China and concentrated 58th Bomb Wing resources in India. The transfer signaled the end of Matterhorn. During the same month, LeMay moved to the Marianas, leaving command of the XX Bomber Command in India to Brigadier general Roger M. Ramey. Between January and March, Ramey's B–29s assisted Mountbatten in South-East Asian Theater, supporting British and Indian ground forces in Burma by targeting rail and port facilities in Indochina, Thailand, and Burma. More distant targets included refineries and airfields in Singapore, Malaya, and the East Indies. The 58th, the only operational wing of the XX Bomber Command, remained in India until the end of March 1945, when it moved to the Marianas to join the XXI Bomber Command.

XX Bomber Command stopped being an operational command at the end of March 1945 when the 58th Bomb Wing moved from India to the Marianas and control of the wing passed to the XXI Bomber Command.

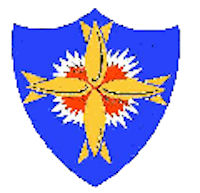
40th Bomb Group
Horizontal tail stripes

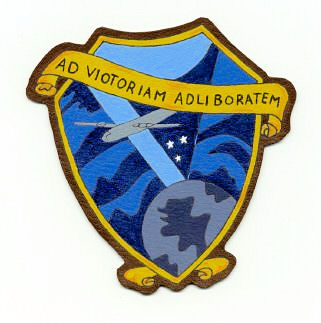
444th Bomb Group
Diamond on tail

462d Bomb Group
Color tail fin

468th Bomb Group
Two Diagonal tail stripes

== Lineage ==
- Constituted as the XX Bomber Command on 19 November 1943

Activated on 20 November 1943
Inactivated on 16 July 1945
Disbanded on 8 October 1948

=== Assignments ===
- Second Air Force, 20 November 1943 – 29 June 1944
- Twentieth Air Force, 19 April 1944 – 18 July 1945 1945 (Note: The two Lineage Histories prepared by the Air Force Historical Research Agency disagree on the command's assignment between April and June 1944. In addition the Twentieth Air Force History has the command assigned for two days after it was inactivated. Robertson.)
- Far East Air Forces, 7–16 July 1945

=== Stations ===
- Smoky Hill Army Air Field, Kansas, 28 November 1943 – 12 February 1944
- Kharagpur Airfield, India, 28 March 1944 – 17 June 1945

Hsinching Airfield, China designated as forward headquarters, 6 April 1944 – 1 April 1945

- Kadena Airfield, Okinawa, 7–16 July 1945

=== Components ===
Combat Units

- 58th Bombardment Wing, 20 November 1943 – 29 June 1944; 8 February – 29 March 1945

Combat from CBI, 2 April 1944 – 29 March 1945

40th Bombardment Group, 20 November 1943 – 12 October 1944; 8 February 1945 – 29 March 1945

Operated from: Chakulia Airfield, India, 2 April 1944 – 25 February 1945
Hsinching Airfield (A-1), China designated as forward staging base.

444th Bombardment Group, 20 November 1943 – 12 October 1944; 8 February 1945 – 29 March 1945

Operated from: Dudhkundi Airfield, India 1 July 1944 – 1 March 1945
Kwanghan Airfield (A-3), China designated as forward staging base.

462d Bombardment Group, 20 November 1943 – 12 October 1944

Operated from: Piardoba Airfield, India 7 April 1944 – 26 February 1945
Kuinglai (Linqiong) Airfield (A-4), China designated as forward staging base.

468th Bombardment Group, 20 November 1943 – 12 October 1944; 8 February 1945 – 29 March 1945

Operated from: Kharagpur Airfield, India, 13 April 1944 – 24 February 1945
Pengshan Airfield (A-7), China designated as forward staging base.

Used the following airfields in Ceylon as staging bases for missions into Malaysia, Singapore and Dutch East Indies:

- Sigiriya Airfield 07°57′20″N 080°43′41″E
- Trincomalee Airfield 08°32′22″N 081°10′35″E
- Ratmalana Airfield 06°49′19″N 079°53′10″E

Second Air Force units

- 472d Bombardment Group, 20 November 1943 – 1 April 1944 (58th BW Training Unit)
- 73d Bombardment Wing, 20 November 1943 – 2 June 1944

497th Bombardment Group, 20 November 1943 – 2 June 1944
498th Bombardment Group, 20 November 1943 – 2 June 1944

499th Bombardment Group, 20 November 1943 – 2 June 1944
500th Bombardment Group, 20 November 1943 – 2 June 1944

- 40th Bombardment Group: 12 October 1944 – 8 February 1945

Squadron

- 23d Antisubmarine Squadron: 6 February 1944

=== Command Structure ===
General Henry "Hap" Arnold named himself the commander of the Twentieth Air Force to avoid diversion of assets from the B-29 effort against Japan, particularly by Admiral Nimitz, who was given command authority over all efforts in the Central Pacific. Brigadier general Haywood S. Hansell became Twentieth Air Force chief of staff. The subordinate commanders of XX Bomber Command were:

- Major general Kenneth B. Wolfe
- Brigadier general LaVerne G. Saunders
- Major general Curtis E. LeMay
- Brigadier general Roger M. Ramey
