= Sixth Army =

Sixth Army may refer to:

== Germany ==
- 6th Army (German Empire), a World War I field Army
- 6th Army (Wehrmacht), a World War II field army
- 6th Panzer Army

== Russia ==
- 6th Army (Russian Empire)
- 6th Army (RSFSR)
- 6th Army (Soviet Union)
- 6th Air Army
- 6th Guards Army
- 6th Guards Air and Air Defence Forces Army
- 6th Guards Combined Arms Army
- 6th Guards Tank Army

== Others ==
- New 6th Army, Republic of China
- 6th Army (France)
- 6th Army (Italy)
- Sixth Army (Austria-Hungary)
- Sixth Army (Ottoman Empire)
- Sixth Area Army, Japan
- Sixth Army (Japan)
- Sixth Army (United States)
- 6th Army (Kingdom of Yugoslavia)

== See also ==
- List of armies by number
- VI Corps (disambiguation)
- 6th Division (disambiguation)
- 6th Brigade (disambiguation)
- 6th Regiment (disambiguation)
- 6th Squadron (disambiguation)
- 6th (disambiguation)
