= 6th Division =

6th Division may refer to:

== Infantry divisions ==
- 6th Division (Australia)
- 6th Division (Austria)
- 6th Infantry Division (Belgium)
- 6th Canadian Infantry Division
- 6th Mechanized Infantry Division, People's Republic of China
- Finnish 6th Division (Winter War)
- Finnish 6th Division (Continuation War)
- 6th Division (Reichswehr)
- 6th Division (German Empire)
- 6th Bavarian Landwehr Division
- 6th Bavarian Reserve Division
- 6th Reserve Division (German Empire)
- 6th Royal Bavarian Division
- 6th Infantry Division (Wehrmacht), Germany (subsequently renamed the 6th Grenadier Division and later the 6th Volksgrenedier Division)
- 6th Luftwaffe Field Division, Germany
- 6th Mountain Division (Wehrmacht)
- 6th Panzergrenadier Division (Bundeswehr)
- 6th SS Mountain Division Nord, Germany
- 6th Parachute Division (Germany)
- 6th Infantry Division (Greece)
- 6th Division (Imperial Japanese Army)
- 6th (Poona) Division, of the British Indian Army before and during the First World War
- 6th Poona Divisional Area, of the British Indian Army during the First World War
- 6th Infantry Division (India)
- 6th Division (Iraq)
- 6th Alpine Division Alpi Graie, Kingdom of Italy
- 6th CC.NN. Division "Tevere", Italy
- 6th Infantry Division Cuneo, Kingdom of Italy
- 6th Division (Japan)
- 6th Amphibious Division, Nigeria
- 6th Division (North Korea)
- 6th Division (Norway)
- 6th Infantry Division (Philippines)
- 6th Infantry Division (Philippine Commonwealth Army)
- 6th Infantry Division (Poland)
- 6th Infantry Division (Russian Empire)
- 6th Motor Rifle Division (Russia)
- 6th Division (Singapore)
- 6th Infantry Division (South Korea)
- 6th Guards Airborne Division
- 6th Guards Motor Rifle Division
- 6th Guards Rifle Division
- 6th Rifle Division (Soviet Union)
- 6th Sich Rifle Infantry Division, Ukraine
- 6th Airborne Division (United Kingdom)
- 6th (UK) Division, United Kingdom
- 6th Infantry Division (United States)
- 6th Marine Division (United States)
- 6th Division (Yugoslav Partisan)

== Cavalry divisions ==
- 6th Cavalry Division (German Empire)
- 6th Cavalry Division (Russian Empire)
- 6th Cavalry Division (Soviet Union)

== Armoured divisions ==
- 6th Armored Division (People's Republic of China)
- 6th Armoured Division (France)
- 6th Panzer Division, German Empire
- 6th Armoured Division (Pakistan)
- 6th Armoured Division (South Africa)
- 6th Armored Division (Syria)
- 6th Armoured Division (United Kingdom)
- 6th Armored Division (United States)

== Other divisions ==
- 6th Air Division (United States)
- 6th Air Division (Japan)
- 6th Antiaircraft Artillery Division of Air Force, People's Republic of China
- 6th Anti-Aircraft Division, United Kingdom
- 6th Cruiser Division, Imperial Japanese Navy
- 6th Fighter Division, People's Republic of China
- 6th Flak Division, Germany
- 6th Guards Fighter Aviation Division, Soviet Union
- 6th Submarine Division, British Royal Navy

== Non-military uses ==
- Butterfield Overland Mail 6th Division
- Division 6 (Swedish football)
- Division 6 (Swedish women's football)
- (various places in Canada)

== See also ==
- Sixth Army (disambiguation)
- VI Corps (disambiguation)
- 6th Brigade (disambiguation)
- 6th Regiment (disambiguation)
- 6 Squadron (disambiguation)
