= VI Corps =

6 Corps, 6th Corps, Sixth Corps, or VI Corps may refer to:

== France ==
- 6th Army Corps (France)
- VI Cavalry Corps (Grande Armée), a cavalry formation of the Imperial French army during the Napoleonic Wars
- VI Corps (Grande Armée), a formation of the Imperial French army during the Napoleonic Wars

== Germany ==
- VI Cavalry Corps (German Empire), a formation of the Imperial German Army during World War I
- VI Corps (German Empire), a formation of the Imperial German Army prior to and during World War I
- VI Reserve Corps (German Empire), a formation of the Imperial German Army during World War I
- VI Army Corps (Wehrmacht), World War II
- VI Flak Corps, Luftwaffe, Wehrmacht
- VI SS Army Corps, Waffen-SS

== Russia and Soviet Union ==
=== Russian Empire ===
- 6th Army Corps (Russian Empire)

=== Russian Civil War ===
- 6th Ural Army Corps

=== Soviet Union ===
- 6th Assault Aviation Corps
- 6th Cavalry Corps (Soviet Union)
- 6th Fighter Aviation Corps of Air Defence
- 6th Guards Mechanized Corps
- 6th Guards Rifle Corps
- 6th Guards Tank Corps
- 6th Mechanized Corps (Soviet Union)
- 6th Rifle Corps
- 6th Tank Corps

== United Kingdom ==
- VI Corps (United Kingdom) a formation of the British Army during World War I

=== Artillery Volunteer Corps ===
- 6th (Thrumster) Caithness Artillery Volunteer Corps
- 6th (3rd Northern) Lanarkshire Artillery Volunteer Corps

=== Rifle Volunteer Corps ===
- 6th (Bangor) Carnarvonshire Rifle Volunteer Corps
- 6th (High Peak Rifles of Buxton) Derbyshire Rifle Volunteer Corps
- 6th (Caergwrle) Flintshire Rifle Volunteer Corps
- 6th Surrey Rifle Volunteer Corps
- 6th (Petworth) Sussex Rifle Volunteer Corps
- 6th (Bradford) Yorkshire West Riding Rifle Volunteer Corps

== United States ==
- VI Corps (United States)
- VI Corps (Union Army), a formation of the Union (North) during the American Civil War
- Sixth Army Corps (Spanish–American War)

== Others ==
- 6th Corps (Afghanistan)
- 6th Corps (Army of the Republic of Bosnia and Herzegovina)
- 6th Corps (People's Republic of China)
- 6th Army Corps (Republic of China)
- VI Corps (Finland)
- VI Army Corps (Italy)
- VI Corps (Ottoman Empire)
- VI Corps (North Korea)
- 6th Corps (Turkey)
- 6th Army Corps (Ukraine)
- 6th Kyiv Corps, Ukraine

== See also ==
- List of military corps by number
- 6th Army (disambiguation)
- 6th Division (disambiguation)
- 6th Brigade (disambiguation)
- 6th Regiment (disambiguation)
- 6th Squadron (disambiguation)
- 6th (disambiguation)
