= 6th Reconnaissance Squadron (disambiguation) =

The 6th Reconnaissance Squadron, now known as the 6th Attack Squadron, is a United States Air Force unit.

6th Reconnaissance Squadron may also refer to:

- 6th Reconnaissance Squadron (Medium), U.S. Army Air Force, January 1941 – April 1942
- 6th Photographic Reconnaissance Squadron
- 6th Strategic Reconnaissance Squadron

== See also ==
- 6th Squadron (disambiguation)
