= 793d Bombardment Squadron =

United States Army Air Forces unit

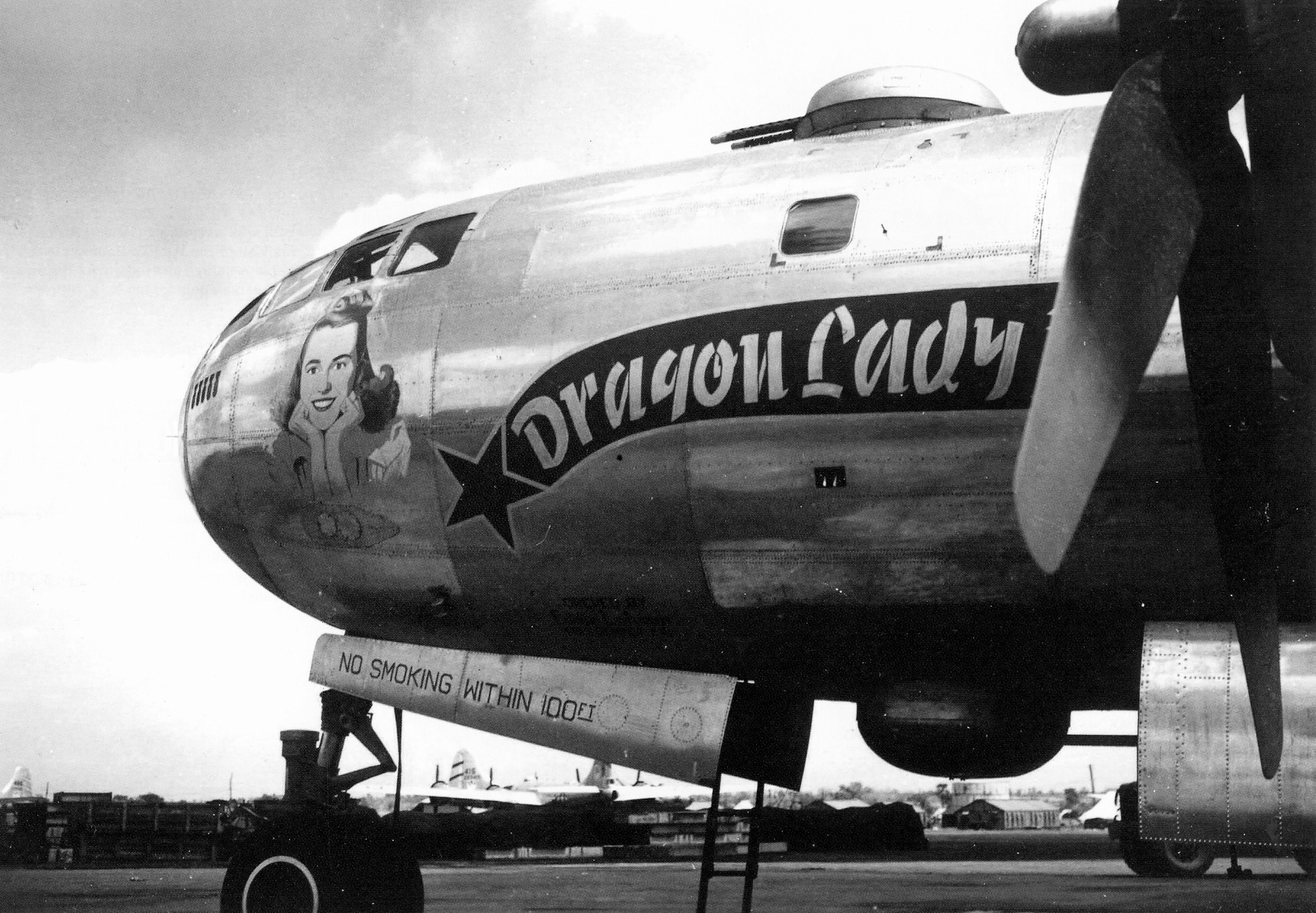
- 793d Bombardment Squadron B-29 Superfortress (Note: Aircraft is Boeing B-29-55-BW Superfortress, serial 44-69663, Dragon Lady. This plane was reclaimed at Robins AFB, Georgia on 18 March 1954. Baugher, Joe (10 June 2023). "1944 USAF Serial Numbers". Joe Baugher.)
- Active: 1943-1946
- Country: United States
- Branch: United States Air Force
- Role: heavy bomber
- Engagements: China-Burma-India Theater; Pacific Theater of Operations
- Decorations: Distinguished Unit Citation

The 793d Bombardment Squadron is a former United States Army Air Forces unit. The squadron was organized in 1943 as one of the first Boeing B-29 Superfortress units. After training in the United States, The squadron moved to India and participated in the strategic bombing campaign against Japan. When bases in the Mariana Islands became available, the squadron moved to Tinian, where it was able to strike targets in Japan without staging through forward bases. It earned three Distinguished Unit Citations during its combat tour. It returned to the United States following V-J Day and briefly became one of the first units in Strategic Air Command before inactivating at the end of March 1946.

== History ==
=== World War II ===
==== Organization and training in the United States ====
The squadron was first organized at Smoky Hill Army Air Field, Kansas on 1 August 1943 as one of the four original squadrons of the 468th Bombardment Group. It was intended to be a Boeing B-29 Superfortress squadron, however due to the lack of B-29 availability, it was initially equipped with Boeing B-17 Flying Fortresses. Smoky Hill was one of four bases chosen for B-29 training based on their proximity to Boeing's factory at Wichita, Kansas, where most of the early Superfortresses would be produced.

Delays in producing the B-29, labor disputes at the engine manufacturer, and modifications to the planes to make them ready for combat resulted in belated deliveries to combat units and it was close to the end of 1943 before aircrews could train in the new bomber in any number. Ground echelon personnel began shipping out to prepare the airfields for the bombers without completing their training in the United States. The air echelon of the squadron trained with the B-29 in Kansas until March 1944, when it departed for its first overseas base, Kharagpur Airfield, Bengal, India, to participate in Operation Matterhorn, which called for B-29 attacks from advanced bases in China, while the bombers' main bases were in India. The squadron completed its training and deployed from the United States to India in March 1944, flying across the South Atlantic and Africa to reach its combat station.

==== Combat in the China Burma India Theater ====
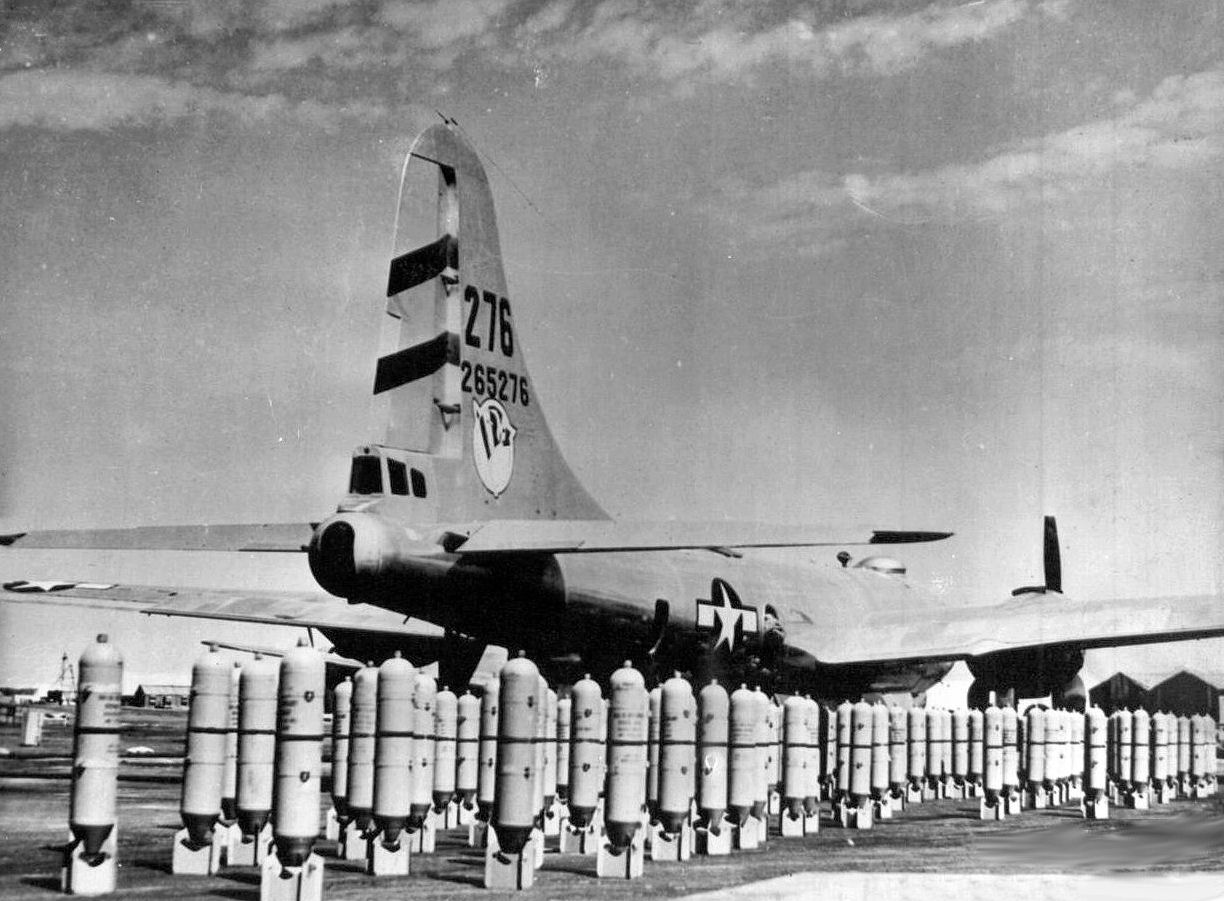
793d Bombardment Squadron B-29 Superfortress (Note: Aircraft is Martin-Omaha built Boeing B-29-25-MO Superfortress, serial 42-65276, Raidin' Maiden II at Kharagpur Airfield, India, 1944. This plane was reclaimed on 21 December 1949. Baugher, Joe (10 June 2023). "1942 USAF Serial Numbers". Joe Baugher.)

The squadron arrived at Kharagpur in mid-April. Once all elements of the 468th Group had arrived at Kharagpur in June, the squadron became part of Twentieth Air Force, which reported directly to Headquarters, Army Air Forces, bypassing theater command. Its initial missions were transporting supplies and equipment to staging airfields in China, and it did not fly its first combat mission until 5 June, when it participated in a raid on railroad repair facilities near Bangkok, Thailand. Ten days later, it participated in the first attack on the Japanese Home Islands since the Doolittle Raid two years earlier. Attacks on Japan required staging through forward bases in China, and squadron bombers consumed twelve gallons of fuel to transport one gallon that could be used for combat missions. The squadron moved its available aircraft to its forward base at Pengshan Airfield near Chengtu. Staging of B-29s, already armed and loaded with bombs began on 13 June and was only completed on the day of the raid, with only refueling needed in China. The primary target for this mission was the Imperial Steel Works at Yawata.

The unit staged through bases not only in China for attacks on Japan, but from other bases in India and Ceylon. It conducted mining operations off the coasts of French Indochina, near Saigon and China, near Shanghai. It attacked Japanese targets in Southeast Asia, including aircraft factories, naval installations, transportation facilities and iron works, and it flew sorties to targets as distant as Indonesia. In August 1944, the squadron again struck the Imperial Steel Works in Yawata, Japan, earning its first Distinguished Unit Citation. Fighter opposition on this attack included the first experience of a Japanese fighter plane intentionally ramming a B-29.

In October 1944, the 468th Bombardment Group was reorganized, along with other groups in XX Bomber Command. The squadron's strength was increased by three B-29s made available by the inactivation of the 795th Bombardment Squadron and maintenance personnel from the disbanding maintenance squadrons of the 468th. During its remaining time in the China-Burma-India Theater, the squadron found itself more frequently attacking tactical targets in Formosa and the Philippines to support of forces advancing in the Pacific.

The squadron abandoned its forward bases in China in January 1945, but continued attacks from Indian airfields. It attacked a supply dump in Rangoon, Burma; rail targets near Bangkok, Thailand and Kuala Lumpur, Malaya, and the drydock in Singapore. On 4 May, the squadron left its base in India for the island of Tinian, although elements of the 468th Group had begun moving as early as February.

==== Combat in the Pacific ====
The squadron arrived at its new base at West Field (Tinian) in the Mariana Islands on 7 May 1945. The squadron was able to operate from its new base against Japan without the need to use forward bases. Most of its attacks were night time raids with incendiary bombs. Is attacks in late May with incendiaries against Tokyo and Yokohama earned the squadron its second DUC. It participated against some strategic targets from high altitude, and earned a third DUC for a daylight attack on an aircraft manufacturing plant at Takarazuka. The squadron also continued minelaying missions.

Following V-J Day, squadron Superfortesses dropped food and supplies to Allied prisoners of war. It also participated in show of force missions.

=== Strategic Air Command ===
The squadron departed Tinian in November 1945 and reassembled at Fort Worth Army Air Field, Texas in December. With the beginning of the new year, the squadron moved to Roswell Army Air Field, New Mexico, where it began to train again with the Superfortress. When Strategic Air Command (SAC) was formed in March, the squadron became one of SAC's first units. However it did not remain long with SAC, but was inactivated at the end of the month.

== Lineage ==
- Constituted as the 793d Bombardment Squadron (Heavy) on 19 May 1943

Activated on 1 August 1943
Redesignated 793d Bombardment Squadron, Very Heavy on 20 November 1943
Inactivated on 31 March 1946

=== Assignments ===
- 468th Bombardment Group, 1 August 1943 – 31 March 1946

=== Stations ===
- Smoky Hill Army Air Field, Kansas, 1 August 1943 – 12 March 1944
- Kharagpur Airfield, Bengal, India, c. 13 April 1944 – 4 May 1945
- West Airfield, Tinian, 7 May–15 November 1945
- Fort Worth Army Air Field, Texas, 1 December 1945
- Roswell Army Air Field, New Mexico, 9 January–31 March 1946

=== Aircraft ===
- Boeing B-17 Flying Fortress
- Boeing B-29 Superfortress, 1943–1946

=== Awards and campaigns ===
Award streamer	Award	Dates	Notes
	Distinguished Unit Citation	20 August 1944	Yawata, Japan
	Distinguished Unit Citation	23, 25 and 29 May 1945	Tokyo and Yokohama, Japan
	Distinguished Unit Citation	24 July 1945	Takarazuka, Japan

Campaign Streamer	Campaign	Dates	Notes
	India-Burma	c. 13 April 1944 – 28 January 1945	
	China Defensive	c. 13 April 1944 – 4 May 1945	
	Air Offensive, Japan	c. 13 April 1944 – 2 September 1945	
	Central Burma	29 January 1945 – 15 July 1945	
	Western Pacific	17 April 1945 – 2 September 1945	

== See also ==
- B-17 Flying Fortress units of the United States Army Air Forces
- List of B-29 Superfortress operators
