= 6th Infantry Regiment =

6th Infantry Regiment may refer to the following units:

- 6th Infantry Regiment "Aosta"
- 6th Infantry Regiment (Duchy of Warsaw)
- 6th Infantry Regiment (Greece)
- 6th Infantry Regiment (Lithuania)
- 6th Infantry Regiment (United States)
- 6th Foreign Infantry Regiment, France
- 6th United States Colored Infantry Regiment
- Infantry Regiment "Saboya" No. 6

== See also ==
- 6th Infantry (disambiguation)
- 6th Regiment (disambiguation)
