= 6th Motor Brigade =

6th Motor Brigade may refer to:

- 6th Motor Brigade (Australia)
- 6th Separate Guards Motor Rifle Brigade, Soviet Union/Russia
- 6th Separate Guards Cossack Motor Rifle Brigade, Russia

== See also ==
- 6th Brigade (disambiguation)
