= List of military corps by number =

This is a list of military corps arranged by ordinal number.

== I to X ==
I Corps

- I Army Corps (Argentina)
- I ANZAC Corps (Australia and New Zealand)
- I Corps (Australia)
- I Corps (Belgium)
- 1st Corps of the Army of the Republic of Bosnia and Herzegovina
- I Canadian Corps
- I Corps (Czechoslovakia)
- Finnish I Corps (Winter War)
- 1st Army Corps (France)
- I Cavalry Corps (Grande Armée), a cavalry formation of the Imperial French army during the Napoleonic Wars
- I Corps (Grande Armée), a corps of the Imperial French army during the Napoleonic Wars
- I Cavalry Corps (German Empire), a unit of the Imperial German Army during World War I
- I Corps (German Empire), a unit of the Imperial German Army prior to and during World War I
- I Reserve Corps (German Empire), a unit of the Imperial German Army during World War I
- I Royal Bavarian Corps, a unit of the Bavarian and Imperial German Armies prior to and during World War I
- I Royal Bavarian Reserve Corps, a unit of the Bavarian and Imperial German Armies during World War I
- I Army Corps (Wehrmacht)
- I SS Panzer Corps
- I Army Corps (Greece)
- I Corps (Hungary)
- I Corps (British India)
- I Corps (India)
- I Corps (North Korea)
- I Corps (Ottoman Empire)
- I Corps (Pakistan)
- Polish I Corps (disambiguation)
- 1st Territorial Army Corps (Romania)
- I Russian Corps.
- Soviet 1st Guards Mechanized Corps
- I Corps (South Korea)
- I Corps (South Vietnam)
- I Corps (United Kingdom)
- I Airborne Corps (United Kingdom)
- I Corps (United States)
- I Amphibious Corps (United States)
- I Armored Corps (United States)
- I Corps (Union Army)
- First Corps, Army of Northern Virginia
- First Corps, Army of Tennessee
- First Army Corps (Spanish–American War)
- I Field Force, Vietnam (United States)
- 1st Army Corps (Ukraine)
- 1st Donetsk Corps
- 1st Azov Corps (Ukraine)
- 1st Corps (Vietnam People's Army)
- 1st Krajina Corps

II Corps

- II Anzac Corps (Australia and New Zealand)
- II Army Corps (Argentina)
- II Corps (Australia)
- II Canadian Corps
- Second Artillery Corps (China)
- Finnish II Corps (Winter War)
- 2nd Army Corps (France)
- II Cavalry Corps (Grande Armée), a cavalry formation of the Imperial French army during the Napoleonic Wars
- II Corps (Grande Armée), a corps of the Imperial French army during the Napoleonic Wars
- II Cavalry Corps (German Empire), a unit of the Imperial German Army during World War I
- II Corps (German Empire), a unit of the Imperial German Army prior to and during World War I
- II Royal Bavarian Corps, a unit of the Bavarian and Imperial German Armies prior to and during World War I
- II Royal Bavarian Reserve Corps, a unit of the Bavarian and Imperial German Armies during World War I
- II SS Panzer Corps
- II Corps (Greece)
- II Corps (India)
- II Corps (North Korea)
- II Corps (Ottoman Empire)
- II Corps (Pakistan)
- 2nd Polish Corps in Russia
- II Corps (Poland)
- 2nd Mechanised Corps (Poland)
- 2nd Polish Corps (2023–present)
- 2nd Rifle Corps
- 2nd Guards Tank Corps
- II Corps (South Korea)
- II Corps (South Vietnam)
- II Corps (United Kingdom)
- II Corps (United States), World War II
- II Corps (ACW), American Civil War
- Second Corps, Army of Northern Virginia
- Second Army Corps (Spanish–American War) a US Army formation active for several months of 1898
- 2nd Azov Corps
- 2nd Khartia Corps (Ukraine)
- 2nd Corps (Vietnam People's Army)
- 2nd Krajina Corps

III Corps

- III Army Corps (Argentina)
- III Corps (Australia)
- 3rd Corps (Army of the Republic of Bosnia and Herzegovina)
- Finnish III Corps (Winter War)
- Finnish III Corps (Continuation War)
- 3rd Army Corps (France)
- III Cavalry Corps (Grande Armée), a cavalry formation of the Imperial French army during the Napoleonic Wars
- III Corps (Grande Armée), a corps of the Imperial French army during the Napoleonic Wars
- III Cavalry Corps (German Empire), a unit of the Imperial German Army during World War I
- III Corps (German Empire), a unit of the Imperial German Army prior to and during World War I
- III Reserve Corps (German Empire), a unit of the Imperial German Army during World War I
- III Royal Bavarian Corps, a unit of the Bavarian and Imperial German Armies prior to and during World War I
- III Army Corps (Wehrmacht) (World War II)
- III Panzer Corps (Germany)
- III (Germanic) SS Panzer Corps
- III Army Corps (Greece)
- III Corps (India)
- Iraqi III Corps
- III Corps (Ottoman Empire)
- III Army Corps (Russian Empire) (World War I)
- 3rd Breakthrough Artillery Corps (Soviet Union)
- 3rd Guards Rifle Corps (Soviet Union)
- 3rd Mechanized Corps (Soviet Union)
- 3rd Rifle Corps (Soviet Union)
- III Corps (South Korea)
- III Corps (South Vietnam)
- III Corps (Turkey)
- III Corps (United Kingdom)
- III Corps (United States)
- III Corps (Union Army)
- Third Army Corps (Spanish–American War)
- 3rd Army Corps (Ukraine)
- 3rd Corps (Vietnam People's Army)

IV Corps

- IV Army Corps (Argentina)
- 4th Army Corps (France)
- IV Cavalry Corps (Grande Armée), a cavalry formation of the Imperial French army during the Napoleonic Wars
- IV Corps (Grande Armée), a corps of the Imperial French army during the Napoleonic Wars
- IV Cavalry Corps (German Empire), a unit of the Imperial German Army during World War I
- IV Corps (German Empire), a unit of the Imperial German Army prior to and during World War I
- IV Reserve Corps (German Empire), a unit of the Imperial German Army during World War I
- IV Army Corps (Wehrmacht), a unit of the German Army in World War II
- IV Army Corps (Greece)
- IV Corps (Hungary)
- IV Corps (India)
- IV Corps (Ottoman Empire)
- IV Corps (Pakistan)
- 4th Territorial Army Corps (Romania)
- IV Corps (South Vietnam)
- 4th Mechanized Corps (Soviet Union)
- IV Corps (United Kingdom)
- IV Corps (United States)
- IV Corps (Union Army)
- Fourth Corps, Army of Northern Virginia
- Fourth Army Corps (Spanish–American War)
- 4th Corps (Vietnam People's Army)

V Corps

- V Army Corps (Argentina)
- V Corps (Bosnia and Herzegovina)
- 5th Army Corps (France)
- V Cavalry Corps (Grande Armée), a cavalry formation of the Imperial French army during the Napoleonic Wars
- V Corps (Grande Armée), a corps of the Imperial French army during the Napoleonic Wars
- V Cavalry Corps (German Empire), a unit of the Imperial German Army during World War I
- V Corps (German Empire), a unit of the Imperial German Army prior to and during World War I
- V Reserve Corps (German Empire), a unit of the Imperial German Army during World War I
- V SS Mountain Corps, a unit of the Waffen SS during World War II
- V Army Corps (Wehrmacht), a unit of the Wehrmacht during World War II
- V Army Corps (Greece)
- V Corps (North Korea)
- V Corps (Ottoman Empire)
- V Corps (Pakistan)
- 5th Corps (Syria)
- V Corps (United Kingdom)
- V Corps (United States)
- V Amphibious Corps (United States)
- V Corps Artillery (United States)
- V Corps (Union Army), an American Civil War formation
- Fifth Army Corps (Spanish–American War), a unit of the U.S. Army organized in 1898 and disbanded in the same year

VI Corps

- VI Cavalry Corps (Grande Armée), a cavalry formation of the Imperial French army during the Napoleonic Wars
- VI Corps (Grande Armée), a formation of the Imperial French army during the Napoleonic Wars
- VI Cavalry Corps (German Empire), a unit of the Imperial German Army during World War I
- VI Corps (German Empire), a unit of the Imperial German Army prior to and during World War I
- VI Reserve Corps (German Empire), a unit of the Imperial German Army during World War I
- VI Corps (Germany) World War II
- VI Corps (Ottoman Empire)
- VI Russian Corps
- VI Corps (United Kingdom) a formation of the British Army during World War I
- VI Corps (United States)
- VI Corps (Union Army), a formation of the Union (North) during the American Civil War
- Sixth Army Corps (Spanish-American War)
- 6th Army Corps (Ukraine)
- 6th Kyiv Corps

VII Corps

- VII Corps (Grande Armée), a corps of the Imperial French army during the Napoleonic Wars
- VII Corps (German Empire), a unit of the Imperial German Army prior to and during World War I
- VII Reserve Corps (German Empire), a unit of the Imperial German Army during World War I
- VII Corps (Ottoman Empire)
- VII Corps (United Kingdom)
- VII Corps (United States)
- VII Corps (Union Army), two separate formations of the Union Army (North) during the American Civil War
- Seventh Army Corps (Spanish–American War)
- 7th Rapid Response Corps (Ukraine)

VIII Corps

- VIII Corps (Grande Armée), a corps of the Imperial French army during the Napoleonic Wars
- VIII Corps (German Empire), a formation of the Imperial German Army prior to and during World War I
- VIII Reserve Corps (German Empire), a formation of the Imperial German Army during World War I
- VIII Corps (Ottoman Empire)
- 8th Cavalry Corps (Soviet Union)
- 8th Estonian Rifle Corps of the Red Army
- 8th Army Corps (Ukraine)
- VIII Corps (United Kingdom)
- VIII Corps (United States), a formation of the U.S. Army in World War I and World War II
- VIII Corps (Union Army), a formation of the American Civil War
- Eighth Army Corps (Spanish–American War), a U.S. Army formation of the Spanish–American and Philippine–American wars
- 8th Air Assault Corps (Ukraine)
- 8th Army Corps (Ukraine)

IX Corps

- 9th Army Corps (France)
- IX Corps (Grande Armée), a corps of the Imperial French army during the Napoleonic Wars
- IX Corps (German Empire), a unit of the Imperial German Army prior to and during World War I
- IX Reserve Corps (German Empire), a unit of the Imperial German Army during World War I
- IX Army Corps (Wehrmacht) of World War II
- IX Waffen Mountain Corps of the SS (Croatian)
- IX Corps (Ottoman Empire)
- IX Corps (United Kingdom)
- IX Corps (United States)
- IX Corps (Union Army)
- 9th Army Corps (Ukraine)

X Corps

- 10th Army Corps (France)
- X Corps (Grande Armée), a corps of the Imperial French army during the Napoleonic Wars
- X Corps (German Empire), a unit of the Imperial German Army prior to and during World War I
- X Reserve Corps (German Empire), a unit of the Imperial German Army during World War I
- X SS Corps
- X Corps (Ottoman Empire)
- X Corps (Pakistan)
- X Corps (United Kingdom)
- X Corps (United States)
- X Corps (Union Army)
- 10th Army Corps (Ukraine)

== XI to XX ==
XI Corps

- 11th Army Corps (France)
- XI Corps (Grande Armée), a corps of the Imperial French army during the Napoleonic Wars
- XI Corps (German Empire), a unit of the Imperial German Army prior to and during World War I
- XI Corps (Ottoman Empire)
- XI Corps (Pakistan), a formation of the Pakistani Army
- 11th Army Corps (Russian Empire)
- XI Corps (United Kingdom), a formation of the British Army during the 1st and 2nd World Wars
- XI Corps (United States), a corps of the United States Army in World War II and the Korean War
- XI Corps (ACW), a formation of the Union (Northern) Army during the American Civil War
- XI Corps (Union Army), a corps of the United States Army in the American Civil War

XII Corps

- 12th Army Corps (France)
- XII Corps (Grande Armée), a corps of the Imperial French army during the Napoleonic Wars
- XII (1st Royal Saxon) Corps, a unit of the Imperial German Army prior to and during World War I
- XII (Royal Saxon) Reserve Corps, a unit of the Imperial German Army during World War I
- XII Corps (India)
- XII Corps (Pakistan)
- XII Corps (Ottoman Empire)
- XII Corps (United Kingdom) (World Wars I and II)
- XII Corps (United States) (World War II)
- XII Corps (ACW) (American Civil War)
- XII Corps (Union Army)
- 12th Corps (Vietnam)

XIII Corps

- XIII Corps (Grande Armée), a corps of the Imperial French army during the Napoleonic Wars
- XIII (Royal Württemberg) Corps, a unit of the Imperial German Army prior to and during World War I
- XIII Corps (Ottoman Empire)
- XIII Russian Corps
- XIII Corps (United Kingdom), a British infantry corps during the First World War, and a British-commanded Commonwealth formation during the Second World War
- XIII Corps (United States)
- XIII Corps (Union Army), America Civil War Corps

XIV Corps

- XIV Corps (Grande Armée), a corps of the Imperial French army during the Napoleonic Wars
- XIV Corps (German Empire), a unit of the Imperial German Army prior to and during World War I
- XIV Reserve Corps (German Empire), a unit of the Imperial German Army during World War I
- XIV Corps (India)
- XIV Corps (Ottoman Empire)
- XIV Corps (United Kingdom)
- XIV Corps (United States)
- XIV Corps (ACW), American Civil War Corps

XV Corps

- XV Corps (British India)
- XV Corps (German Empire), a unit of the Imperial German Army prior to and during World War I
- 15th Army Corps (Russian Empire), World War I
- XV Royal Bavarian Reserve Corps, a unit of the Bavarian and Imperial German Armies during World War I
- XV Army Corps (Wehrmacht)
- XV Mountain Corps (Wehrmacht)
- Indian XV Corps
- Ottoman XV Corps, World War I
- XV Corps (United States), World War II
- XV Corps (Union Army), American Civil War
- XV Corps (United Kingdom), World War I
- 15th Rifle Corps, USSR, World War II
- XV SS Cossack Cavalry Corps, Germany, World War II

XVI Corps

- 16th Army Corps (France)
- XVI Corps (German Empire), a unit of the Imperial German Army prior to and during World War I
- XVI Corps (Germany)
- XVI Corps (India)
- XVI Corps (United Kingdom), a British field corps during World War I
- XVI Corps (Union Army), a corps of the Union Army during the American Civil War

XVII Corps

- XVII Corps (German Empire), a unit of the Imperial German Army prior to and during World War I
- XVII Reserve Corps (German Empire), a unit of the Imperial German Army during World War I
- XVII Corps (Union Army)
- XVII Corps (United Kingdom)

XVIII Corps

- 18th Army Corps (France)
- XVIII Corps (German Empire), a unit of the Imperial German Army prior to and during World War I
- XVIII Reserve Corps (German Empire), a unit of the Imperial German Army during World War I
- XVIII Corps (Germany)
- XVIII Corps (United Kingdom)
- XVIII Airborne Corps (United States)
- XVIII Corps (Union Army), a unit of the Union (Northern) Army during the American Civil War

XIX Corps

- 19th Army Corps (France)
- XIX (2nd Royal Saxon) Corps, a unit of the Imperial German Army prior to and during World War I
- XIX Corps (United States)
- XIX Corps (Union Army)
- XIX Corps (United Kingdom)

XX Corps

- XX Corps (German Empire), a unit of the Imperial German Army prior to and during World War I
- XX Corps (United Kingdom)
- XX Corps (United States)
- XX Corps (Union Army) – a United States Army Corps during the American Civil War
- 20th Army Corps (Russian Empire)

== XXI-XXX ==
XXI Corps

- XXI Corps (German Empire), a unit of the Imperial German Army prior to and during World War I
- XXI Corps (Ottoman Empire), active during World War I
- XXI Corps (United Kingdom), active during World War I
- Indian XXI Corps, active during World War II
- XXI Corps (India), currently active Indian Army corps
- XXI Corps (United States), active during World War II
- XXI Corps (Union Army), active during the American Civil War
- 21st Army Corps (Ukraine)

XXII Corps

- XXII Reserve Corps (German Empire), a unit of the Imperial German Army during World War I
- XXII Corps (Ottoman Empire), World War I
- XXII Corps (ACW), United States Civil War unit
- XXII Corps (United States)
- XXII Corps (United Kingdom)

XXIII Corps

- XXIII Corps (ACW)
- XXIII Reserve Corps (German Empire), a unit of the Imperial German Army during World War I
- XXIII Corps (United States)
- XXIII Corps (United Kingdom)
- XXIII Russian Corps

XXIV Corps

- XXIV Reserve Corps (German Empire), a unit of the Imperial German Army during World War I
- XXIV Corps (ACW)
- XXIV Corps (United States)

XXV Corps

- XXV Reserve Corps (German Empire), a unit of the Imperial German Army during World War I
- XXV Corps (Ottoman Empire), a corps of the Ottoman Army
- XXV Corps (Union Army), a corps of the Union Army during the American Civil War

XXVI Corps

- XXVI Reserve Corps (German Empire), a unit of the Imperial German Army during World War I

XXVII Corps

- XXVII Reserve Corps (German Empire), a unit of the Imperial German Army during World War I
- XXVII Army Corps (Wehrmacht), a unit of the German Army during World War II

XXVIII Corps

- XXVIII Army Corps (Wehrmacht), a unit of the German Army during World War II

XXIX Corps

- 29th Corps (People's Republic of China)
- XXIX Army Corps (Wehrmacht)
- 29th Army Corps (Russian Empire)
- 29th Army Corps (Soviet Union)
- 29th Rifle Corps (Soviet Union)
- 29th Tank Corps, Soviet Union

XXX Corps

- XXX Corps (United Kingdom)
- XXX Corps (Wehrmacht)
- XXX Corps (Pakistan)
- 30th Marine Corps (Ukraine)

== XXXI and above ==
XXXI Corps

- XXXI Corps (Pakistan)
- XXXI Army Corps (Wehrmacht)
- XXXI Army Corps (Italy)

XXXII Corps

- XXXII Army Corps (Wehrmacht)

XXXIII Corps

- Indian XXXIII Corps (WWII)
- Indian XXXIII Corps
- United States XXXIII Corps
- 33rd Army Corps (Russian Empire)
- XXXIII Army Corps (Wehrmacht)

XXXIV Corps

- Indian XXXIV Corps
- XXXIV Army Corps (Wehrmacht)

XXXV Corps

- 35th Army Corps (France)
- United States XXXV Airborne Corps, a diversionary 'phantom' unit of the United States Army
- 35th Army Corps (Russian Empire)
- XXXV Army Corps (Wehrmacht), a German unit during World War II, part of Army Group Centre

XXXVI Corps

- 36th Army Corps (France)
- German XXXVI Corps
- XXXVI Mountain Corps (Wehrmacht), Germany
- 36th Army Corps (Russian Empire)
- XXXVI Corps (United States)

XXXVII Corps

- XXXVII Corps (United States)
- 37th Guards Airborne Corps, Soviet Union

XXXVIII Corps

- XXXVIII Reserve Corps (German Empire)
- XXXVIII Army Corps (Wehrmacht)

XXXIX Corps

- XXXIX Reserve Corps (German Empire)
- XXXIX Corps (Wehrmacht)
- XXXIX Mountain Corps (Wehrmacht)

XL Corps

- XXXX Reserve Corps (German Empire)
- XXXX Panzer Corps, a tank corps in the German Army during World War II

XLI Corps

- 41st Army Corps (France)
- XXXXI Reserve Corps (German Empire)
- 41st Army Corps (Russian Empire)
- XLI Tank Corps (Wehrmacht)

and higher numbered

- 42nd Rifle Corps
- XXXXIII Army Corps (Wehrmacht)
- 43rd Army Corps (Soviet Union)
- XXXXIV Army Corps (Wehrmacht)
- XXXXVI Tank Corps (Wehrmacht)
- XXXXVII Tank Corps (Wehrmacht)
- XXXXVIII Tank Corps (Wehrmacht)
- XXXXIX Mountain Corps (Wehrmacht)
- LI Mountain Corps (Wehrmacht)
- 51st Corps (German Empire)
- 52nd Corps (German Empire)
- 53rd Corps (German Empire)
- 54th Corps (German Empire)
- 55th Corps (German Empire)
- 56th Corps (German Empire)
- LVI Tank Corps (Wehrmacht)
- 57th Corps (German Empire)
- LVII Tank Corps (Wehrmacht)
- 58th Corps (German Empire)
- LVIII Tank Corps (Wehrmacht)
- 59th Corps (German Empire)
- 60th Corps (German Empire)
- 61st Corps (German Empire)
- 62nd Corps (German Empire)
- 63rd Corps (German Empire)
- 64th Corps (German Empire)
- 65th Corps (German Empire)
- 66th Corps (German Empire)
- LXVI Army Corps (Wehrmacht)
- 67th Corps (German Empire)
- LXVII Army Corps (Wehrmacht)
- 68th Corps (German Empire)
- LXVIII Army Corps (Wehrmacht)
- LXIX Army Corps (Wehrmacht)
- LXX Army Corps (Wehrmacht)
- LXXI Army Corps (Wehrmacht)
- LXXII Army Corps (Wehrmacht)
- LXXIII Army Corps (Wehrmacht)
- LXXIV Army Corps (Wehrmacht)
- LXXV Army Corps (Wehrmacht)
- LXXVI Tank Corps (Wehrmacht)
- LXXVIII Army Corps (Wehrmacht)
- LXXX Army Corps (Wehrmacht)
- LXXXI Army Corps (Wehrmacht)
- LXXXII Army Corps (Wehrmacht)
- LXXXIII Army Corps (Wehrmacht)
- LXXXIV Army Corps (Wehrmacht)
- LXXXV Army Corps (Wehrmacht)
- LXXXVI Army Corps (Wehrmacht)
- LXXXVII Army Corps (Wehrmacht)
- LXXXVIII Army Corps (Wehrmacht)
- LXXXIX Army Corps (Wehrmacht)
- LXXXX Army Corps (Wehrmacht)
- LXXXXI Army Corps (Wehrmacht)
- LXXXXVII Army Corps (Wehrmacht)
- CI Army Corps (Wehrmacht)

== See also ==
- List of military corps by name
- List of military corps
