= 6th Guards Brigade =

6th Guards Brigade may refer to:

- 6th Guards Kiev-Berlin Mechanised Brigade, Belarus
- 6th Separate Guards Motor Rifle Brigade, Soviet Union/Russia
- 6th Separate Guards Cossack Motor Rifle Brigade, Russia
- 6th Guards Tank Brigade (United Kingdom)

== See also ==
- 6th Brigade (disambiguation)
