= Women's football in Sweden =

Football played by Swedish women

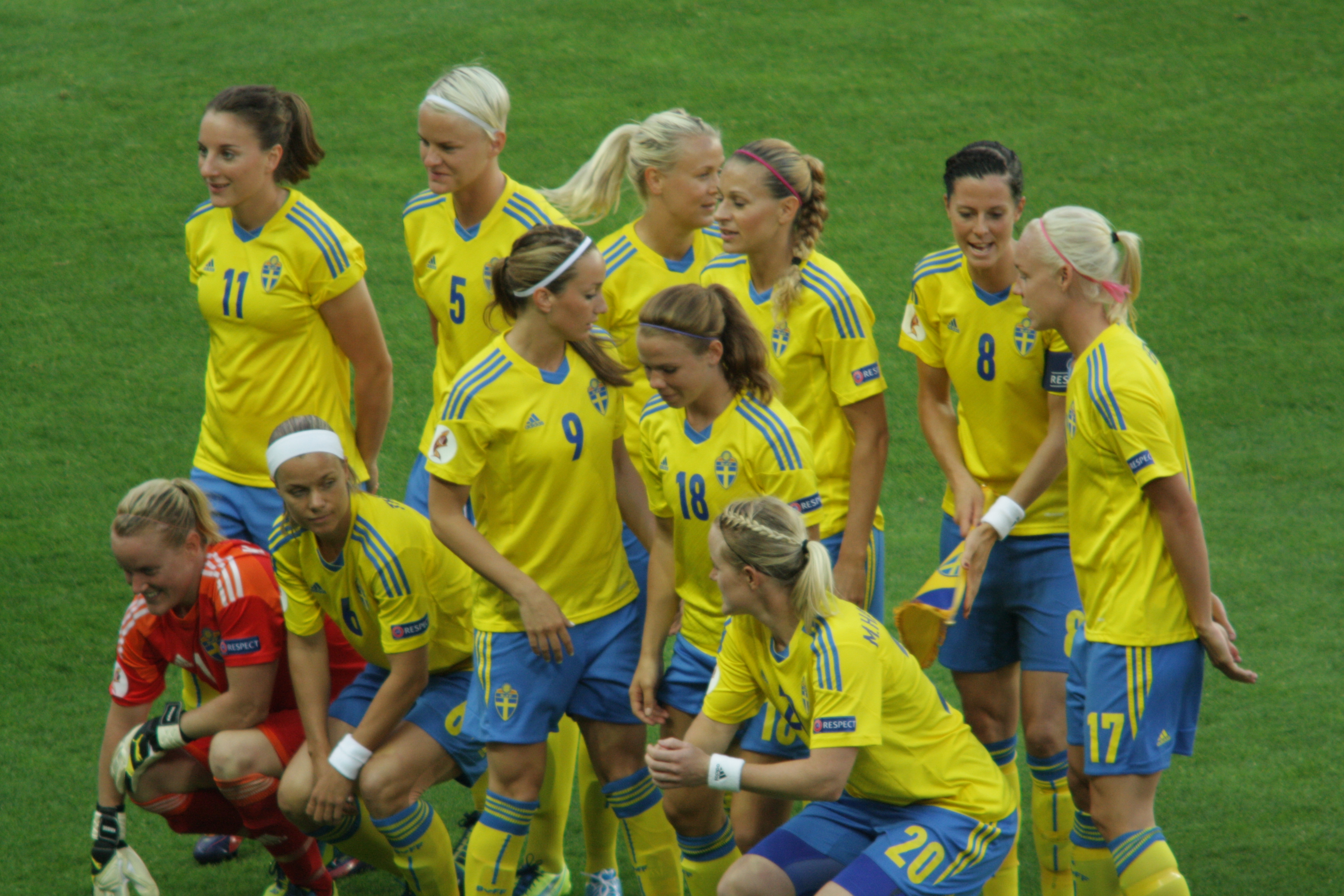
- The Swedes before the semi-final against Germany at Euro 2013
- Country: Sweden
- Governing body: SvFF
- National team: Sweden women's national team

National competitions
- Damallsvenskan; Elitettan; Division 1 Division 2 Division 3 Division 4 Division 5 Division 6

Club competitions
- Svenska Cupen Damer

International competitions
- Champions League; FIFA Women's World Cup (National Team); European Championship (National Team); Olympics (National Team)

Sweden is one of the traditional powers of women's football.

== History ==
The earliest recorded occurrence of women's football in Sweden was in 1919.

== National competition ==
Damallsvenskan is the national competition for women footballers in Sweden, a division consisting of 12 teams, who assigns the national champion of Sweden. Damallsvenskan is the first ever professional league for women's football in the world. From Damallsvenskan the lower division is Elitettan the teams ranked at the last two places in the final standings. The second division is represented by the Ellitettan division, created in 2013 and consisting of 14 teams. The first two classifieds of the Elettettan are promoted to Damallsvenskan, while the last three are relegated to Division 1. The third division is represented by Division 1, consisting of teams of 12 teams each, for a total of 72 teams on a geographic basis. The winning teams of the six groups are facing to define the three teams promoted in Eloitan, according to the following scheme: 1st ranked Norra Svealand vs. 1st ranked Norrland; 1st place Norra Götaland vs. 1st place classified Södra Svealand; 1st place Södra Götaland against 1st place classified Mellersta Götaland. It used to one of the top lragues.

Level	League(s)/Division(s)
1	Damallsvenskan; 12 clubs
2	Elitettan; 12 clubs
3–8	Swedish Women's Football Division 1-6 several divisions

== National team ==
The best performance is winning the European Championship in 1984. They won silver in the 2016 Olympics and the 2003 World Cup.

== See also ==
- Football in Sweden
