= 6th Dragoons =

The 6th Dragoons or 6th Dragoon Regiment may refer to:

- 6th (Inniskilling) Dragoons, a British regiment active 1689-1922
- 6th Dragoon Regiment (France), a French regiment

== See also ==
- 6th Dragoon Guards
- 6th Regiment (disambiguation)
