= Lahuta =

Lahuta may refer to:

- Lahuta, Lahutë or gusle, a single-stringed musical instrument
- Lahutā, a Buddhist term
- Ukrainian form of the surname Laguta
  - Hennadiy Lahuta (1974-2023), Ukrainian politician
