= 6th Infantry =

6th Infantry may refer to:

- 6th Infantry Regiment (disambiguation)
- 6th Infantry Brigade (disambiguation)
- 6th Infantry Division (disambiguation)

== See also ==
- 6th (disambiguation)
