= 6th Attack Squadron =

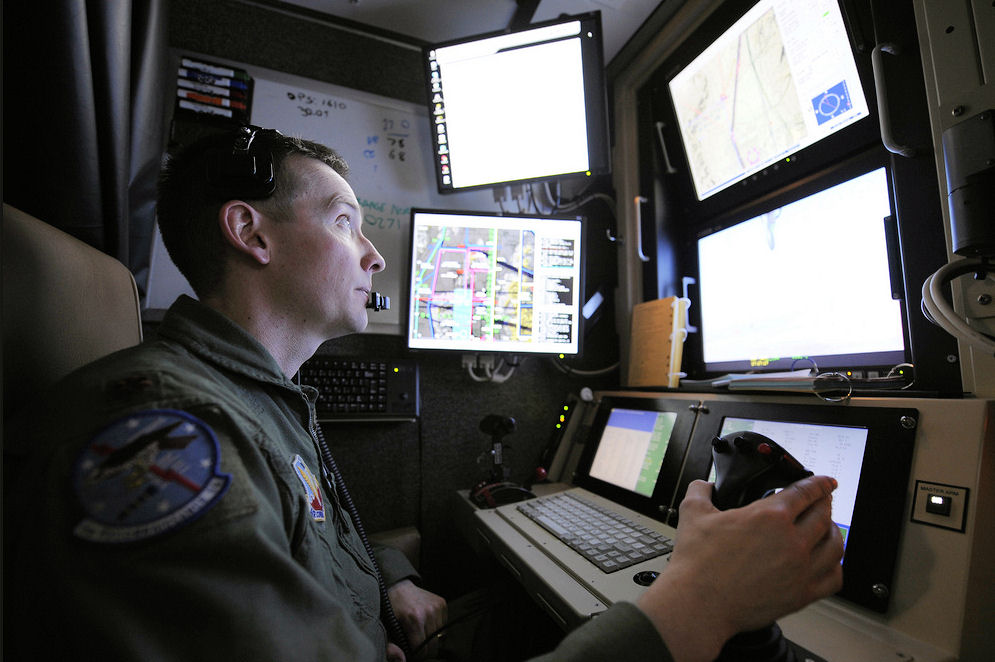
- A member of the squadron pilots an MQ-1 Predator during a training mission
- Active: 1943–1946; 1955–1962; 1963–1969; 2009–present
- Country: United States
- Branch: United States Air Force
- Role: Unmanned aerial vehicle attack
- Garrison/HQ: Holloman Air Force Base
- Nickname: Hawks
- Motto: Raptores (Latin for 'Raptors')
- Engagements: China Burma India Theater; Pacific Theater of Operations
- Decorations: Distinguished Unit Citation; Air Force Outstanding Unit Award

Insignia
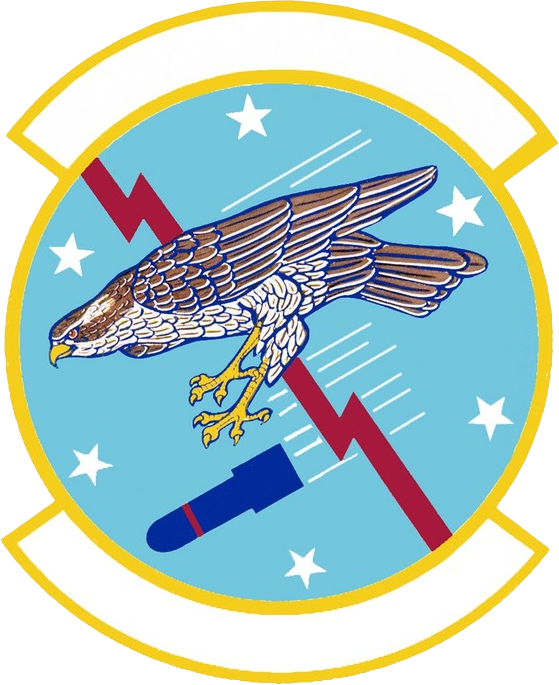
- 6th Attack Squadron emblem (Note: Approved 20 May 1964.)

The 6th Attack Squadron is an active United States Air Force unit, assigned to the 49th Wing at Holloman Air Force Base, New Mexico. The squadron is a formal training unit for crews learning to operate unmanned aerial vehicles.

The squadron was first organized in 1943 as the 794th Bombardment Squadron, one of the first Boeing B-29 Superfortress units of the Army Air Forces. After training in the United States, the squadron moved to India, where it participated in the strategic bombing campaign against Japan. In 1945, it moved to the Mariana Islands, from which it continued its attacks against Japan, earning three Distinguished Unit Citations before returning to the United States. It converted to the aerial reconnaissance role as the 6th Reconnaissance Squadron, becoming one of the first units in Strategic Air Command (SAC) before inactivating in March 1946.

The squadron was again activated in SAC in June 1955 as the 6th Strategic Reconnaissance Squadron, flying Boeing RB-47 Stratojets, before returning to the bombardment mission as the 6th Bombardment Squadron. It was inactivated in 1962 as the B-47 was phased out, but activated as a Boeing B-52 Stratofortress unit the following year. It was inactivated in December 1969, when SAC removed older B-52s from its inventory. The squadron was activated in its current role in 2009.

== History ==
=== World War II ===
==== Organization and training in the United States ====
The squadron was first organized at Smoky Hill Army Air Field, Kansas on 1 August 1943 as the 794th Bombardment Squadron, one of the four original squadrons of the 468th Bombardment Group. It was intended to be a Boeing B-29 Superfortress squadron, however due to the lack of B-29 availability, it was initially equipped with Boeing B-17 Flying Fortresses. Smoky Hill was one of four bases chosen for B-29 training based on their proximity to Boeing's factory at Wichita, Kansas, where most of the early Superfortresses would be produced.

Delays in producing the B-29, labor disputes at the engine manufacturer, and modifications to the planes to make them ready for combat resulted in belated deliveries to combat units and it was close to the end of 1943 before aircrews could train in the new bomber in any number. Ground echelon personnel began shipping out to prepare the airfields for the bombers without completing their training in the United States. The air echelon of the squadron trained with the B-29 in Kansas until March 1944, when it departed for its first overseas base, Kharagpur Airfield, Bengal, India, to participate in Operation Matterhorn, which called for B-29 attacks from advanced bases in China, while the bombers' main bases were in India. The squadron completed its training and deployed from the United States to India in March 1944, flying across the South Atlantic and Africa to reach its combat station.

==== Combat in the China Burma India Theater ====
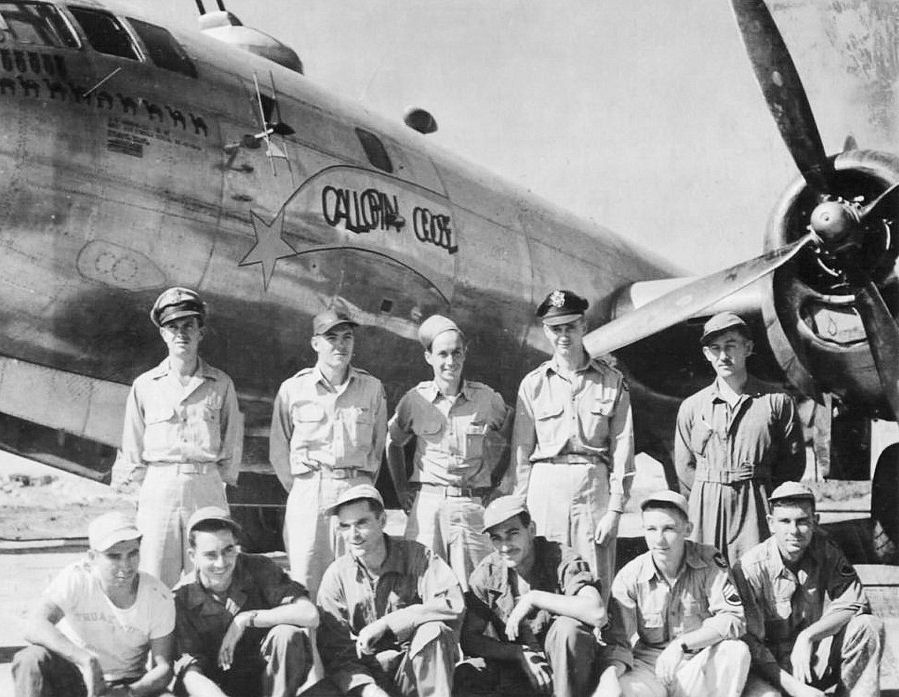
794th Bombardment Squadron B-29 'Gallopin' Goose (Note: Aircraft is Boeing B-29-15-BW Superfortress, serial 42-6390, Gallopin' Goose. It was rammed by a Japanese Nakajima Ki-44 over Mukden, China on 7 December 1944. 10 crewmembers were killed, one bailed out and became a prisoner of war. Baugher, Joe (2 June 2023). "1942 USAF Serial Numbers". Joe Baugher. Missing Air Crew Report 10101.)

The squadron arrived at Kharagpur in mid-April. Once all elements of the 468th Group had arrived at Kharagpur in June, the squadron became part of Twentieth Air Force, which reported directly to Headquarters, Army Air Forces, bypassing theater command. Its initial missions were transporting supplies and equipment to staging airfields in China, and it did not fly its first combat mission until 5 June, when it participated in a raid on railroad repair facilities near Bangkok, Thailand. Ten days later, it participated in the first attack on the Japanese Home Islands since the Doolittle Raid two years earlier. Attacks on Japan required staging through forward bases in China, and squadron bombers consumed twelve gallons of fuel to transport one gallon that could be used for combat missions. The squadron moved its available aircraft to its forward base at Pengshan Airfield near Chengtu. Staging of B-29s, already armed and loaded with bombs began on 13 June and was only completed on the day of the raid, with only refueling needed in China. The primary target for this mission was the Imperial Steel Works at Yawata.

The unit staged through bases not only in China for attacks on Japan, but from other bases in India and Ceylon. It conducted mining operations off the coasts of French Indochina, near Saigon and China, near Shanghai. It attacked Japanese targets in Southeast Asia, including aircraft factories, naval installations, transportation facilities and iron works, and it flew sorties to targets as distant as Indonesia. In August 1944, the squadron again struck the Imperial Steel Works in Yawata, earning its first Distinguished Unit Citation. Fighter opposition on this attack included the first experience of a Japanese fighter plane intentionally ramming a B-29.

In October 1944, the 468th Bombardment Group was reorganized, along with other groups in XX Bomber Command. The squadron's strength was increased by three B-29s made available by the inactivation of the 795th Bombardment Squadron and maintenance personnel from the disbanding maintenance squadrons of the 468th. During its remaining time in the China-Burma-India Theater, the squadron found itself more frequently attacking tactical targets in Formosa and the Philippines to support of forces advancing in the Pacific.

The squadron abandoned its forward bases in China in January 1945, but continued attacks from Indian airfields. It attacked a supply dump in Rangoon, Burma; rail targets near Bangkok, Thailand and Kuala Lumpur, Malaya, and the drydock in Singapore. On 4 May, the squadron left its base in India for the island of Tinian, although elements of the 468th Group had begun moving as early as February.

==== Combat in the Pacific ====
The squadron arrived at its new base at West Field (Tinian) in the Mariana Islands on 7 May 1945. The squadron was able to operate from its new base against Japan without the need to use forward bases. Most of its attacks were nighttime raids with incendiary bombs. Its attacks in late May with incendiaries against Tokyo and Yokohama earned the squadron its second DUC. It participated against some strategic targets from high altitude, and earned a third DUC for a daylight attack on an aircraft manufacturing plant at Takarazuka. The squadron also continued minelaying missions.

Following V-J Day, squadron Superfortesses dropped food and supplies to Allied prisoners of war. It also participated in show of force missions.

=== Strategic Air Command ===
==== Initial assignment ====
The squadron departed Tinian in November 1945 and reassembled at Fort Worth Army Air Field, Texas in December, where it was redesignated the 6th Reconnaissance Squadron and began converting to the aerial reconnaissance mission. With the beginning of the new year, the squadron moved to Roswell Army Air Field, New Mexico, where it trained again with the Superfortress. When Strategic Air Command (SAC) was formed in March, the squadron became one of SAC's first reconnaissance units as part of the 311th Reconnaissance Wing. However it did not remain long with SAC, but was inactivated at the end of the month.

==== B-47 Stratojet operations ====
The squadron was activated along with the 70th Strategic Reconnaissance Wing in June 1955 and equipped with the Boeing RB-47 Stratojet. Although it was nominally stationed at Little Rock Air Force Base, Arkansas, the squadron operated from Lockbourne Air Force Base, Ohio while construction was completed to prepare Little Rock's runways for the jet powered B-47. Once the squadron moved to Little Rock in October 1955, it conducted global reconnaissance and provided targeting materials to headquarters, SAC. In February 1958, the 70th Wing began reducing its reconnaissance operations and in September 1958 squadron began to train B-47 and RB-47 aircrews, with the last RB-47 class graduating in October 1961. The 70th Wing began transitioning to the medium bomber mission in late 1961, but it had not become combat ready in June 1962, when B-47s at Little Rock were consolidated into the 384th Bombardment Wing and the squadron was inactivated.

==== B-52 Stratofortress operations ====
In the late 1950s SAC was concerned that bases with large concentrations of bombers made attractive targets for a Soviet attack. SAC's response was to break up its wings and scatter their aircraft over a larger number of bases. As part of this force dispersal, SAC established the 4123d Strategic Wing at Clinton-Sherman Air Force Base, Oklahoma. However, the 4123d was a Major Command controlled (MAJCON) wing, which could not carry a permanent history or lineage, and SAC wanted to replace it with a permanent unit. In February 1963, the 70th Bombardment Wing replaced the 4123d, and the 6th was reactivated, assuming the personnel and Boeing B-52E Stratofortresses of the 4123d's 98th Bombardment Squadron, which was simultaneously inactivated.

The squadron trained for strategic bombing missions. One half of the squadron's aircraft were maintained on fifteen minute alert, fully fueled and ready for combat to reduce vulnerability to a Soviet missile strike, except for periods in which the aircraft were deployed. Some personnel were deployed to the Pacific after 1968, and for several months in 1968 and in 1969, all of the squadron's aircraft and most of its personnel were deployed to Southeast Asia, where they were attached to other SAC organizations conducting combat missions under Operation Arc Light. "A few months after the first B-52Bs started leaving the operational inventory, Robert S. McNamara, Secretary of Defense . . . announced another phaseout program that would further reduce SAC’s bomber force. Basically, this program called for the mid-1971 retirement of all of the B-52Cs, and of several subsequent B-52 models." With the implementation of this program, the squadron was inactivated at the end of 1969.

=== Unmanned aerial vehicle training ===
The squadron became the 6th Reconnaissance Squadron and was activated at Holloman Air Force Base, New Mexico in October 2009. The squadron provided initial qualification training for pilots and sensor operators learning to operate the General Atomics MQ-1 Predator remotely operated aircraft until 2017, when the General Atomics MQ-9 Reaper replaced the MQ-1. In 2016, the squadron became the 6th Attack Squadron to more accurately reflect the roles of the unmanned aerial vehicles it trained with.

== Lineage ==
- Constituted as the 794th Bombardment Squadron (Heavy) on 19 May 1943

Activated on 1 August 1943
Redesignated 794th Bombardment Squadron, Very Heavy on 20 November 1943
Redesignated 6th Reconnaissance Squadron, Very Long Range, Photographic-RCM (Note: The official designation used an abbreviation for radio countermeasures.) on 17 December 1945
Inactivated on 31 March 1946

- Redesignated 6th Strategic Reconnaissance Squadron and activated on 24 June 1955

Redesignated 6th Bombardment Squadron on 25 October 1961
Discontinued and inactivated on 25 June 1962

- Redesignated 6th Bombardment Squadron, Heavy and activated on 15 November 1962 (not organized)

Organized on 1 February 1963
Inactivated on 31 December 1969

- Redesignated 6th Reconnaissance Squadron on 20 October 2009

Activated on 23 October 2009
Redesignated 6th Attack Squadron on 15 May 2016

=== Assignments ===
- 468th Bombardment Group, 1 August 1943
- 311th Reconnaissance Wing, 7–31 March 1946.
- 70th Strategic Reconnaissance Wing (later 70th Bombardment Wing): 24 June 1955 – 25 June 1962
- Strategic Air Command: 15 November 1962 (not organized)
- 70th Bombardment Wing: 1 February 1963 – 31 December 1969
- 49th Operations Group, 23 October 2009 – present

=== Stations ===
- Smoky Hill Army Air Field, Kansas, 1 August 1943 – 12 March 1944
- Kharagpur Airfield, India, c. 13 April 1944 – 4 May 1945
- West Airfield (Tinian), 7 May-15 November 1945
- Fort Worth Army Air Field, Texas, 1 December 1945
- Roswell Army Air Field, New Mexico, 9 Jan-31 March 1946
- Little Rock Air Force Base, Arkansas, 24 June 1955 – 25 June 1962
- Clinton-Sherman Air Force Base, Oklahoma, 1 February 1963 – 31 December 1969
- Holloman Air Force Base, New Mexico, 23 October 2009 – present

=== Aircraft ===
- Boeing B-17 Flying Fortress, 1943
- Boeing B-29 Superfortress, 1943–1946
- Boeing RB-47 Stratojet, 1955–1962
- Boeing B-52 Stratofortress, 1963–1969
- General Atomics MQ-1 Predator, 2009–2017
- General Atomics MQ-9 Reaper, 2017–present

=== Awards and campaigns ===
Award streamer	Award	Dates	Notes
	Distinguished Unit Citation	20 August 1944	Yawata, Japan, 794th Bombardment Squadron
	Distinguished Unit Citation	23, 25 and 29 May 1945	Tokyo and Yokohama, Japan, 794th Bombardment Squadron
	Distinguished Unit Citation	24 July 1945	Takarazuka, Japan, 794th Bombardment Squadron
	Air Force Outstanding Unit Award	5 February 1957-30 December 1957	6th Strategic Reconnaissance Squadron
	Air Force Outstanding Unit Award	15 April 1968-1 October 1968	6th Bombardment Squadron
	Air Force Outstanding Unit Award	1 June 2011-31 May 2013	6th Reconnaissance Squadron

Campaign Streamer	Campaign	Dates	Notes
	India-Burma	c. 13 April 1944 – 28 January 1945	794th Bombardment Squadron
	China Defensive	c. 13 April 1944 – 4 May 1945	794th Bombardment Squadron
	Air Offensive, Japan	c. 13 April 1944 – 2 September 1945	794th Bombardment Squadron
	Central Burma	29 January 1945 – 15 July 1945	794th Bombardment Squadron
	Western Pacific	17 April 1945 – 2 September 1945	794th Bombardment Squadron

== See also ==
- List of B-52 Units of the United States Air Force
- List of B-47 units of the United States Air Force
- List of B-29 Superfortress operators
- B-17 Flying Fortress units of the United States Army Air Forces
