= 468th Bombardment Group =

- 468th Bombardment Group Insignia
- Active: 1943–1946
- Country: United States
- Branch: United States Army Air Forces
- Role: Bombardment
- Part of: Twentieth Air Force
- Garrison/HQ: Pacific Ocean Theater of World War II
- Engagements: World War II; Asiatic-Pacific Campaign (1944–1945)

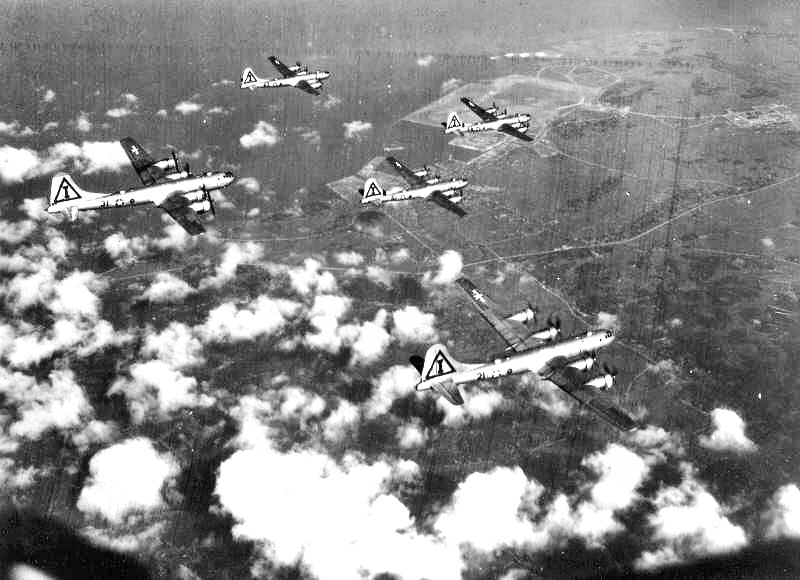
468th Bomb Group B-29 Superfortresses over Japan, 1945

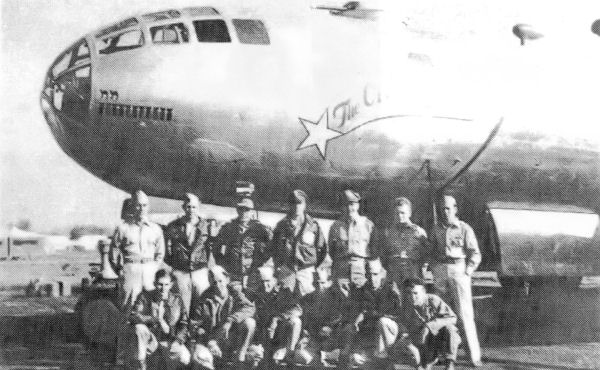
Photo of "The Craig Comet" Bell-Atlanta B-29-15-BA Superfortress 42-63445 of the 794th Bomb Squadron 468th Bomb Wing, Kalaikunda AB, India

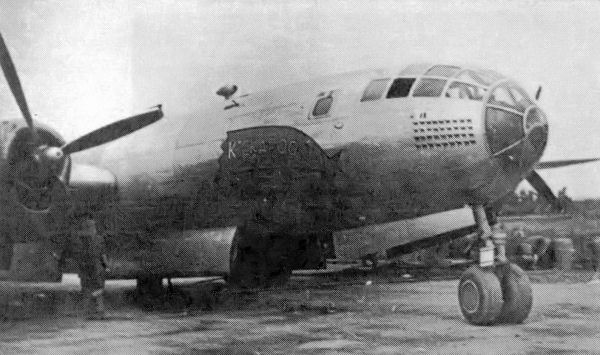
Photo of "Kickapoo II" Martin-Omaha B-29-1-MO Superfortress 42-6232 of the 468th Bomb Wing, Kalaikunda AB, India. This aircraft was condemned after being damaged in combat, 20 June 1944.

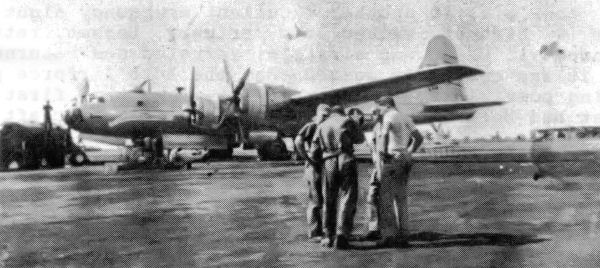
Photo of "American Beauty" Boeing B-29-45-BW Superfortress 42-24703 of the 792d Bomb Squadron 468th Bomb Wing, Kalaikunda AB, India

The 468th Bombardment Group was a World War II United States Army Air Forces combat organization. The unit served primarily in the Pacific Ocean theater and China Burma India Theater of World War II as part of Twentieth Air Force. The 468th Bomb Group's aircraft engaged in very heavy bombardment Boeing B-29 Superfortress operations against Japan. After its reassignment to the Mariana Islands in 1945, its aircraft were identified by a "I" and a triangle painted on the tail. It was inactivated on 31 March 1946.

== History ==
The unit was established in May 1943 at Smoky Hill Army Airfield, Kansas as a Boeing B-29 Superfortress Very Heavy bombardment Group. The 468th was one of the four initial operational groups of the 58th Bombardment Wing, the first operational B-29 wing programmed for overseas deployment into combat. When established, the group was assigned four bomb squadrons (792d, 793d, 794th and 795th), all being newly constituted.

Initially assigned a mixture of eight Martin B-26 Marauders, twelve Boeing B-17 Flying Fortresses and four YB-29 preproduction Superfortresses, for training. Initial production B-29 aircraft received were in a constant state of being operationally ready or in a maintenance status for modification by Boeing technicians. Crews began to arrive in November 1943, but very few bombers were ready to receive them. At that time, there was only one Superfortress for every twelve crews, and most crews had to train on the Martin B-26 Marauders or Boeing B-17 Fortresses. The program was seriously hampered by the need to work in the open air in inclement weather, by delays in acquiring the necessary tools and support equipment, and by the USAAF's general lack of experience with the B-29.

A crash program was initiated by General Hap Arnold, head of the Army Air Forces to put things in order. The mechanics often had to work outdoors in freezing weather, since the hangars were not large enough to accommodate the B-29s. As a result of superhuman efforts on the part of all concerned, 150 B-29s had been handed over to the 58th Bomb Wing by 15 April 1944. The 468th BG would have thirty of these B-29s sent to India before the group entered combat.

In March/April 1944 as each airplane was made combat-ready, its flight crew and crew chief departed for overseas; their initial destination in the China-Burma-India (CBI) theater. One B-29 passed through England in an attempt to confuse Axis intelligence about the intended theatre of action of the B-29, although the B-29 was never intended for use in the European theatre.

In India, the 58th Wing came under the XX Bomber Command, the 468th Bomb Group arriving at Kharagpur Airfield on 13 April. However overheated engines plagued the B-29s in India. The entire B-29 fleet had to be grounded en route until the cause was found. My mid-May the B-29s were again ready. The initial mission of the 468th in India was to use their aircraft to haul bombs, fuel, ammunition and spare parts 1,200 miles to its advanced base at Field A-7, Pengshan, Szechwan Province, China. Six round trips were necessary to deliver enough fuel for one airplane to mount a combat mission from China – an impractical logistics concept for an aerial campaign, particularly with an airplane plagued with an unreliable engine.

On 5 June 1944, the 468th flew its first operational mission from Kharagpur against railroad yards at Bangkok, Thailand. Ten days later, flying from field A-7 (Pengshan Airfield), the group bombed the Imperial Iron & Steel Works, Yawata, Japan – the opening of the B-29 phase of the Air Offensive against Japan.

By late 1944, it established the best operational record of the four B-29 groups then in combat, for which Headquarters XX Bomber Command awarded it General Billy Mitchell's personal sailing burgee and authorized it to adopt the name "The General Billy Mitchell Group," a name requiring outstanding performance of duty. Within a year, it participated in eight campaigns and earned three Distinguished Unit Citations.

From June 1944 until May 1945, operating at maximum range, the 468th conducted aerial reconnaissance and bombardment operations from India and China against Japanese targets in Japan, Manchuria, China, Taiwan, Burma, the Malay Peninsula, Singapore and Sumatra. Sixteen-hour combat missions were common; the longest 21. Weather, terrain and the enemy were equally unforgiving. The B-29 was still being "invented" and its operational tactics had to be proved while the airplane was being de-bugged in the face of the enemy.

In July 1944, the United States Marines invaded the Mariana Islands and as soon as West Field, Tinian, was readied in May 1945, the India-based B-29s were again designated the 58th Bombardment Wing and flew to West Field and continued the air offensive against Japan; operating as part of the new XXI Bomber Command.

Upon arrival the group's personnel were engaged in Quonset hut construction. By the end of April most personnel were able to move into the huts from the initial tents which they were assigned on arrival. The group began operations in May 1944 against targets located in the Japanese Home Islands. The group flew many missions against strategic objectives in Japan; on numerous raids, made its attacks in daylight and from high altitude. In October 1944 shortages in aircraft and equipment led to the 795th Bomb Squadron being inactivated, with its personnel being consolidated into other group squadrons.

The 468th flew its last combat mission from Tinian on 15 August 1945. It had played a vital role in the sudden, almost overnight development of Twentieth Air Force strength and had fought from beginning to end in the Pacific Air Offensive. After V-J Day, the 497th dropped supplies to Allied prisoners, participated in show-of-force missions, and flew over Japan to evaluate bombardment damage. On 2 September 1945, Major General Curtis LeMay had the group lead the 20th Air Forces show of force over the USS Missouri during the Japanese surrender ceremonies. As part of the 20th Air Force, it has participated in the first use of air power to end a major conflict without having to fight one's way into the enemy homeland.

In December 1945 the unit returned to the United States; initially being assigned to Continental Air Forces's (CAF) Second Air Force at Fort Worth Army Airfield, Texas. At Fort Worth, the 512th Bombardment Squadron joined the group; it previously being a Fifteenth Air Force B-24 Liberator squadron based in Italy, having been returned to the United States in May and was undergoing B-29 Very Heavy Bomber upgrade training in Nebraska when its former assigned group, the 376th Bombardment Group, was inactivated.

In January 1946, the group was reassigned the CAF Fourth Air Force at Roswell Army Airfield, New Mexico; then being transferred to the new Strategic Air Command on 21 March 1946, being one of SAC's initial bombardment groups. Demobilization, however, was in full swing and the group turned in its aircraft and was inactivated on 31 March.

=== Lineage ===
- Constituted as 468th Bombardment Group (Heavy) on 19 May 1943

Activated on 1 August 1943
Redesignated 468th Bombardment Group (Very Heavy) in November 1943
Inactivated on 31 March 1946.

=== Assignments ===
- 58th Bombardment Wing, 1 August 1943 – 12 October 1944
- XX Bomber Command, 13 October 1944 – 7 February 1945
- 58th Bombardment Wing, 8 February-15 November 1945
- Continental Air Forces, 1 December 1945
- Strategic Air Command, 21–31 March 1946

=== Components ===
- 512th Bombardment Squadron 10 November 1945 – 26 March 1946
- 791st Bombardment Squadron, 7–31 Mar 1946
- 792d Bombardment Squadron 1 August 1943 – 31 March 1946
- 793d Bombardment Squadron 1 August 1943 – 31 March 1946
- 794th Bombardment Squadron 1 August 1943 – 31 March 1946
- 795th Bombardment Squadron 1 August 1943 – 12 October 1944
- 13th Bombardment Maintenance Squadron
- 14th Bombardment Maintenance Squadron
- 15th Bombardment Maintenance Squadron
- 16th Bombardment Maintenance Squadron
- 14th Photographic Laboratory Squadron

=== Stations ===
- Smoky Hill AAFld, KS 1 August 1943 – 12 March 1944
- Kharagpur Airfield, India, 13 April 1944 – 24 February 1945

Pengshan Airfield (A-7), China designated as forward staging base.

- West Field, Tinian, Mariana Islands 6 April – 15 November 1945
- Ft Worth AAFld, TX 1 December 1945
- Roswell AAFld, NM 12 January – 31 March 1946

=== Aircraft flown ===
- Martin B-26 Marauder, 1943–1944 (Training Only)
- Boeing B-17 Flying Fortress, 1943–1944 (Training Only)
- Boeing B-29 Superfortress, 1944–1946
