= 6th Infantry Brigade =

6th Infantry Brigade may refer to:

- 6th Canadian Infantry Brigade
- 6th Indian Infantry Brigade
- 6th Infantry Brigade (Australia)
- 6th Infantry Brigade (Lebanon)
- 6th Infantry Brigade (New Zealand)
- 6th Infantry Brigade (South Africa)
- 6th Infantry Brigade (United Kingdom)

== See also ==
- 6th Brigade (disambiguation)
