= 795th Bombardment Squadron =

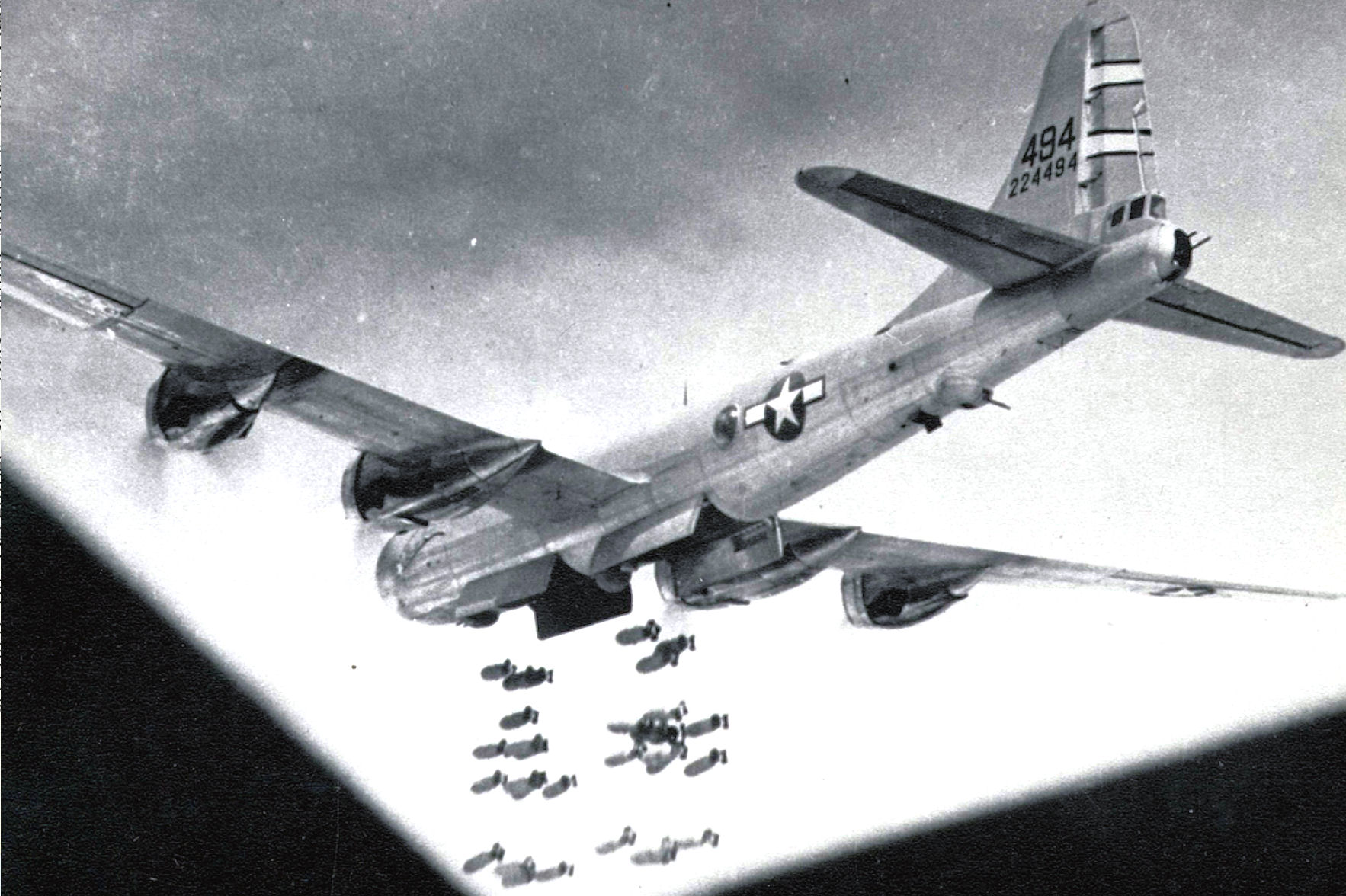
- 468th Bombardment Group B-29 Superfortress attacking a target on Formosa in October 1944 (Note: Aircraft is Boeing B-29-30-BW Superfortress, serial 42-24494, Mary Ann attacking with high-explosive bombs. This airplane overshot the runway due to propeller failure on 17 June 1945 at West Field, Tinian.)
- Active: 1943–1944
- Country: United States
- Branch: United States Air Force
- Role: strategic bombardment
- Engagements: China Burma India Theater
- Decorations: Distinguished Unit Citation

The 795th Bombardment Squadron is a former United States Army Air Forces unit. The squadron was organized in 1943 as one of the first Boeing B-29 Superfortress units. After training in the United States, The squadron moved to India and participated in the strategic bombing campaign against Japan, earning a Distinguished Unit Citation before being disbanded on 12 October 1944 when the Army Air Forces reorganized its very heavy bomber groups to consist of only three squadrons.

== History ==
=== Organization and training in the United States ===
The squadron was first organized at Smoky Hill Army Air Field, Kansas on 1 August 1943 as one of the four original squadrons of the 468th Bombardment Group. It was intended to be a Boeing B-29 Superfortress squadron, however due to the lack of B-29 availability, it was initially equipped with Boeing B-17 Flying Fortresses. Smoky Hill was one of four bases chosen for B-29 training based on their proximity to Boeing's factory at Wichita, Kansas, where most of the early Superfortresses would be produced.

Delays in producing the B-29, labor disputes at the engine manufacturer, and modifications to the planes to make them ready for combat resulted in belated deliveries to combat units and it was close to the end of 1943 before aircrews could train in the new bomber in any number. Ground echelon personnel began shipping out to prepare the airfields for the bombers without completing their training in the United States. The air echelon of the squadron trained with the B-29 in Kansas until March 1944, when it departed for its first overseas base, Kharagpur Airfield, Bengal, India, to participate in Operation Matterhorn, which called for B-29 attacks from advanced bases in China, while the bombers' main bases were in India. The squadron completed its training and deployed from the United States to India in March 1944, flying across the South Atlantic and Africa to reach its combat station.

=== Combat operations ===
The squadron arrived at Kharagpur in mid-April. Once all elements of the 468th Group had arrived at Kharagpur in June, the squadron became part of Twentieth Air Force, which reported directly to Headquarters, Army Air Forces, bypassing theater command. Its initial missions were transporting supplies and equipment to staging airfields in China, and it did not fly its first combat mission until 5 June, when it participated in a raid on railroad repair facilities near Bangkok, Thailand. Ten days later, it participated in the first attack on the Japanese Home Islands since the Doolittle Raid two years earlier. Attacks on Japan required staging through forward bases in China, and squadron bombers consumed twelve gallons of fuel to transport one gallon that could be used for combat missions. The squadron moved its available aircraft to its forward base at Pengshan Airfield near Chengtu. Staging of B-29s, already armed and loaded with bombs began on 13 June and was only completed on the day of the raid, with only refueling needed in China. The primary target for this mission was the Imperial Steel Works at Yawata.

The unit staged through bases not only in China for attacks on Japan, but from other bases in India and Ceylon. It conducted mining operations off the coasts of French Indochina, near Saigon and China, near Shanghai. It attacked Japanese targets in Southeast Asia, including aircraft factories, naval installations, transportation facilities and iron works, and it flew sorties to targets as distant as Indonesia. In August 1944, the squadron again struck the Imperial Steel Works in Yawata,, earning a Distinguished Unit Citation. Fighter opposition on this attack included the first experience of a Japanese fighter plane intentionally ramming a B-29.

In October 1944, the 468th Bombardment Group was reorganized, along with other groups in XX Bomber Command. The squadron was disbanded and its planes and crews were used to increase the size of the 468th Group's remaining three squadrons.

== Lineage ==
- Constituted as the 795th Bombardment Squadron (Heavy) on 19 May 1943

Activated on 1 August 1943
Redesignated 795th Bombardment Squadron, Very Heavy on 20 November 1943
Disbanded on 12 October 1944

=== Assignments ===
- 468th Bombardment Group, 1 August 1943 – 12 October 1944

=== Stations ===
- Smoky Hill Army Airfield, Kansas, 1 August 1943 – 12 March 1944
- Kharagpur Airfield, India, c. 13 April – 12 October 1944

=== Aircraft ===
- Boeing B-17 Flying Fortress, 1943
- Boeing B-29 Superfortress, 1943–1944

=== Awards and campaigns ===
| Award streamer | Award | Dates | Notes |
|---|---|---|---|
| | Distinguished Unit Citation | 20 August 1944 | Yawata, Japan |

| Campaign Streamer | Campaign | Dates | Notes |
|---|---|---|---|
| | India-Burma | c. 13 April 1944 – 12 October 1944 | |
| | China Defensive | c. 13 April 1944 – 12 October 1944 | |
| | Air Offensive, Japan | c. 13 April 1944 – 12 October 1944 | |

== See also ==
- B-17 Flying Fortress units of the United States Army Air Forces
- List of B-29 Superfortress operators
