= List of military corps by name =

This is a list of military corps arranged by name.

== Germany ==
- Cavalry Corps Schmettow (German Empire), a unit of the Imperial German Army during World War I
- Ersatz Corps, a unit of the Imperial German Army during World War I
- Guards Corps (German Empire), a unit of the Imperial German Army prior to and during World War I
- Guards Reserve Corps, a unit of the Imperial German Army during World War I
- Landwehr Corps, a unit of the Imperial German Army during World War I
- Afrika Korps
- Gebirgskorps Norwegen

== Others ==
- Allied Rapid Reaction Corps
- Australian Corps
- Australian and New Zealand Army Corps
- British Cavalry Corps
- Canadian Corps
- Danish-Baltic Auxiliary Corps
- Desert Mounted Corps (formerly Desert Column)
- Multinational Corps Northeast
- Multinational Corps Southeast
- New Zealand Corps
- Reserve Cavalry Corps (Grande Armée), a cavalry corps of the Imperial French army during the Napoleonic Wars
