= Laguta =

Laguta, also transliterated Lahuta (Cyrillic: Лагута), is a surname. Notable people with the surname include:

- Artem Laguta (born 1990), Russian motorcycle speedway rider, brother of Grigory
- Grigory Laguta (born 1984), Russian-born Latvian motorcycle speedway rider
- Hennadiy Lahuta (1974–2023), Ukrainian politician
