= 6th Brigade =

6th Brigade may refer to:

== Argentina ==
- VI Mountain Brigade (Argentina)

== Australia ==
- 6th Armoured Brigade (Australia)
- 6th Brigade (Australia)
- 6th Cavalry Brigade (Australia)
- 6th Motor Brigade (Australia)

== Austria ==
- 6th Brigade (Austria)

== Belarus ==
- 6th Guards Kiev-Berlin Mechanised Brigade
- 6th Separate Special-Police Brigade

== British India ==
- 6th Indian Brigade
- 6th Indian Cavalry Brigade
- 6th Indian Infantry Brigade

== Canada ==
- 6th Canadian Infantry Brigade
- 6 Canadian Combat Support Brigade

== France ==
- 6th Light Armoured Brigade (France)

== Israel ==
- Etzioni Brigade

== Lebanon ==
- 6th Infantry Brigade (Lebanon)

== New Zealand ==
- 6th Infantry Brigade (New Zealand)

== Norway ==
- 6th Brigade (Norway)

== Poland ==
- 6th Airborne Brigade (Poland)

== Romania ==
- 6th Anti-aircraft Missiles Brigade (Romania)
- 6th Special Operations Brigade "Mihai Viteazu"

== Russia ==
- 6th Separate Tank Brigade
- 6th Separate Guards Motor Rifle Brigade
- 6th Separate Guards Cossack Motor Rifle Brigade

== South Africa ==
- 6th Infantry Brigade (South Africa)

== Soviet Union ==
- 6th Rocket Brigade
- 6th Separate Guards Motor Rifle Brigade

== Ukraine ==
- 6th Mechanized Brigade (Ukraine)

== United Kingdom ==
- 6th Airlanding Brigade (United Kingdom)
- 6th Anti-Aircraft Brigade (United Kingdom)
- 6th Armoured Brigade (United Kingdom)
- 6th Cavalry Brigade (United Kingdom)
- 6th Cyclist Brigade
- 6th Guards Tank Brigade (United Kingdom)
- 6th Infantry Brigade (United Kingdom)
- 6th Mounted Brigade (United Kingdom)
- 6th (Gurkha) Parachute Brigade
- 6th Provisional Brigade
- 6th Reserve Brigade

=== Artillery units ===
- 6th Brigade, North Irish Division, Royal Artillery
- 6th Brigade, Scottish Division, Royal Artillery
- 6th County of London Brigade, Royal Field Artillery
- 6th (Howitzer) Brigade Royal Field Artillery
- 6th (Kent) Army Brigade, Royal Field Artillery
- 6th (Cheshire and Shropshire) Medium Brigade, Royal Garrison Artillery
- VI Brigade, Royal Horse Artillery

== United States ==
- 6th Air Defense Artillery Brigade (United States)
- 6th Cavalry Brigade (United States)
- 6th Reserve Officers' Training Corps Brigade

== See also ==
- 6th Division (disambiguation)
- 6th Regiment (disambiguation)
