= 6th Photographic Squadron =

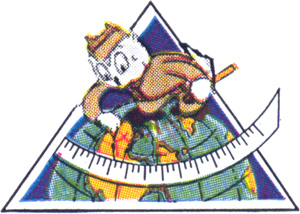
- Emblem of the 6th Photographic Squadron
- Active: 1942–1945
- Country: United States
- Branch: United States Air Force
- Role: Reconnaissance/Mapping

The Sixth Photographic Squadron is an inactive United States Air Force unit. It was last assigned to the 311th Photographic Wing. It was inactivated at Jefferson Barracks, Missouri on 1 January 1945.

== History ==
The Sixth Photographic Squadron was formed and activated in early 1942 under the Second Air Force of the United States Army Air Forces. It was quartered on land adjacent to the Colorado Springs (Colorado) Municipal Airport, which became Colorado Springs Army Air Base which became Peterson Air Force Base (which still exists as the North American Aerospace Defense Command (NORAD), the Air Force Space Command headquarters, and United States Northern Command (USNORTHCOM) headquarters).

Some of the squadron trained with F-4 aircraft (the reconnaissance version of the P-38 Lightning) in the northwest United States, however the squadron never reached operational readiness. It was reassigned to HQ Army Air Forces and assigned to administrative duties supporting 1st AAF Motion Picture unit in Culver City, California (November 1942 – March 1943).

It was then reassigned to the Third Air Force under control of HQ USAAF, and based in Colorado Springs, Colorado. 'Sixth photo' received film from aerial reconnaissance units deployed around the world in combat areas, then using photogrammetric equipment developed detailed maps and charts of foreign areas. The squadron was a very elite, specialized unit in which most personnel had a minimum of 2 years of university education in aerial photography analysis; also many personnel had backgrounds in cartography and commercial photography and art. The squadron produced many maps of formerly uncharted areas and provided much intelligence information to commanders in deployed combat areas with highly accurate and detailed maps of landing beaches and rear areas held by enemy forces around the world. One project was the maps for Gen. Doolittle's raid on Tokyo on 18 April 1942.

In late 1944 the Group was assigned to 311th Photographic Wing and alerted for reassignment to China-Burma-India Theater, however unit never deployed due to difficulties and reluctance in moving large qualities of sensitive and classified equipment to primitive facilities, plus foreseen inherent difficulties of supporting the unit deployed overseas.

The unit was inactivated on 1 January 1945.

== Lineage ==
- Constituted as the 6th Photographic Squadron on 19 January 1942

Activated on 28 January 1942
Redesignated 6th Photographic Reconnaissance Squadron on 9 June 1942
Redesignated 6th Photographic Squadron (Photographic Compilation) on 28 November 1942
Disbanded on 1 January 1945
Reconstituted on 19 July 1985 and consolidated with 6th Liaison Squadron and 6th Airborne Command and Control Squadron as 6th Airborne Command and Control Squadron

=== Assignments ===
- Second Air Force, 28 January 1942
- II Air Support Command, 29 March 1942
- 2d Photographic Group, 7 May 1942
- Army Air Forces, 28 November 1942
- Third Air Force, 8 March 1943 (under operational direction of HQ, Army Air Forces)
- 1st Photographic Charting Group, 13 November 1943
- 311th Photographic Wing, 5 October 1944 – 1 January 1945

=== Stations ===
- Geiger Field, Washington, 28 January 1942
- Felts Field, Washington, 2 February 1942
- Colorado Springs Army Air Base, Colorado, 14 May 1942
- Jefferson Barracks, Missouri, 14 December 1944 – 1 January 1945

=== Aircraft ===
- Undetermined, possibly the photo-recon versions of the P-38/F4 Lighting (1942, 1943) and later the P-51 Mustang/F-6 (1944). In 1948 the designation P-51 (P for pursuit) was changed to F-51 (F for fighter), and the photo-recon Mustangs were redesignated as RF-51s.

In addition to the F4 Lightning, the F7 (Photo Recon version of the B-24) was a mainstay of the squadron. The Squadron History found at Maxwell, AFB shows many photos of the squadron, actual images taken, and intel analysis of the photos as well as monthly squadron activities. In April 1945, the B-29 Superfortress arrived and was specially assigned to the squadron. This gave a much longer range to the Unit and flights roundtrip, nonstop began to China and other islands that were out of range for the F7.
