= Division 6 (Swedish women's football) =

Women's association football league in Sweden

Division 6 (Swedish: Division 6 i fotboll för damer) is the eight level in the league system of Swedish women's soccer.

== Sources ==
- Everysport, accessdate 29 October 2013
