= 6th Kyiv Corps =

Military unit

- 6-й Київський корпус
- Active: 1 October 1919–1920
- Allegiance: Makhnovshchina
- Branch: Revolutionary Insurgent Army of Ukraine
- Type: Partisan corps
- Size: 1,000
- Nickname: Kyiv Insurgent Corps
- Equipment: 500 bayonets, 20 sabers, 4 machine guns.
- Engagements: Ukrainian War of Independence

Commanders
- Notable commanders: Oleksandr Kalyuzhny

The 6th Kyiv Corps was a military formation of the Revolutionary Insurgent Army of Ukraine, one of 4 corps which was created in October 1919 and existed until 1920.

== History ==
On 1 September 1919, a meeting of insurgents was held in Dobrovelychkivka, at which a delegate was elected from each regiment. The meeting discussed the question of the further political existence of the Makhnovshchina as an independent organism. They also discussed the issue of reorganizing the insurgent regiments into a single army that would be effective in guerrilla warfare. The meeting elected a Military Revolutionary Council, as the central command of the insurgents. The insurgent regiments led by Nestor Makhno were officially named the Revolutionary Insurgent Army of Ukraine (RIAU). Viktor Bilash was in charge of organizing the army. Bilash developed the structure of the RIAU, which consisted of four corps (three active and one reserve), each built from a number of divisions, which were in turn divided into regiments, battalions, companies and platoons.

At the end of September 1919, the RIAU headquarters in the village of Verblyuzhki created the Kyiv Corps from a battalion of former Hryhorivites and the 1st Makhnovist regiment, and Oleksandr Kalyuzhny was elected commander. The group was instructed to go to the village of Peschaniy Brod, to find Nestor Makhno and give him the orders of the headquarters and the RIAU council. The insurgent group was also supposed to occupy the area of Uman, Tarashcha, Korsun-Shevchenkivskyi and Zvenyhorodka, in the vicinity of which the Makhnovists were to start forming the "Kyiv Insurgent Corps". On 1 October, the created corps left Verblyuzhki to conduct military operations in the Uman region, where they helped evacuate wounded Makhnovists.

On 17 November, Ryabonov's Kyiv group in the Korsun region occupied Stavyshche and Kaniv, destroying and displacing the forces of Abram Dragomirov to Volodarka.

=== Second formation ===
In November 1919, as part of the 3rd Katerynoslavsky corps, the Volno-Cossack Insurgent Katerynoslavschiny group was created, headed by Gladchenko, the further command assumed by this group included the Middle Dnieper group, and other small detachments in the regions of Kamianske, Znamianka and Dolinskaya, after which the group was deployed to the 6th Kyiv corps.

== Composition ==
- Hryhorivsky battalion
- 5th Huliaipole regiment (3rd corps)

== Bibliography ==
- Bilash, Oleksandr; Bilash, Viktor (1993). Дороги Нестора Махно (in Russian).
- Shatailo, O. L. (2000). Генерал Юрко Тютюнник (in Russian). Lviv: Svit. p. 144. ISBN 966-603-041-1.
