= 6 Squadron =

No. 6 Squadron or 6th Squadron may refer to:

== Aviation units ==
- No. 6 Squadron RAAF, a unit of the Royal Australian Air Force
- No. 6 Squadron RCAF, a unit of the Royal Canadian Air Force
- No. 6 Squadron (Finland)
- No. 6 Squadron IAF, a unit of the Indian Air Force
- No. 6 Squadron RJAF, a unit of the Royal Jordanian Air Force
- No. 6 Squadron RNZAF, a unit of the Royal New Zealand Air Force
- No. 6 Squadron PAF, a unit of the Pakistan Air Force
- No. 6 Squadron RSAF, a unit of the Royal Saudi Air Force
- 6 Squadron SAAF, a unit of the South African Air Force
- No. 6 Squadron SLAF, a unit of the Sri Lanka Air Force
- No. 6 Squadron RAF, a unit of the United Kingdom Royal Air Force
- 6th Tactical Fighter Squadron (JASDF), Japan
- 6th Tactical Squadron, Poland
- Fliegerstaffel 6, Swiss Air Force

=== United States ===
==== Army Air Force and Air Force ====
- 6th Airlift Squadron
- 6th Air Refueling Squadron
- 6th Bombardment Squadron
- 6th Bombardment Squadron, later 6th Air Refueling Squadron
- 6th Intelligence Squadron
- 6th Photographic Squadron
- 6th Reconnaissance Squadron
- 6th Reconnaissance Squadron (Medium)
- 6th Special Operations Squadron
- 6th Tactical Missile Squadron
- 6th Weapons Squadron

==== Marine Corps ====
- Air Warning Squadron 6
- Marine Air Control Squadron 6
- Marine Air Support Squadron 6

==== Navy ====
- HC-6 (Helicopter Combat Support Squadron 6)
- RVAH-6 (Reconnaissance Attack (Heavy) Squadron 6)
- VF-6 (Fighter Squadron 6)
- VH-6 (Rescue Squadron 6)
- VP-6 (Patrol Squadron 6)
- VP-6 (1924–1926)
- VT-6 (Training Squadron 6)
- VXE-6 (Antarctic Development Squadron 6)

== Naval units ==
- 6th Battle Squadron, United Kingdom
- 6th Frigate Squadron, United Kingdom
- Destroyer Squadron 6, United States
- Submarine Squadron 6, United States

== Space units ==
- 6th Space Operations Squadron, United States
- 6th Space Warning Squadron, United States

== Other units ==
- 6 Engineer Squadron, Canada
