= 6th Division (Austria) =

- 6. Division
- Active: 1920–1938
- Country: Austria
- Branch: Austrian Bundesheer
- Type: Light infantry
- Role: Mountain warfare
- Headquarters: Innsbruck

Commanders
- Notable commanders: Eugen Beyer

The 6th Division (German: 6. Division; before 1935 the 6th Brigade, 6. Brigade) was a division of alpine troops in the Austrian Bundesheer of the First Austrian Republic. Headquartered in Innsbruck, it drew from Carinthia, Salzburg, Tyrol, and Vorarlberg. After the Anschluss of Austria by Nazi Germany in 1938, it was folded into the 2nd Mountain Division of the Wehrmacht which was formed on 1 April 1938 at Innsbruck. Eugen Beyer was its last commander.

== Units ==
The units permanently assigned to the division were:

- Divisional Staff (Innsbruck)
- Tiroler Jägerregiment (Innsbruck)
- Tiroler Landesschützenregiment Dr. Dollfuß (Solbad Hall and Kufstein)
- Vorarlberger Alpenjägerbataillon Nr. 4 (Bregenz and Bludenz)
- Tiroler und Vorarlberger Leichtes Artillerieregiment Nr. 6 (Innsbruck)
- Telegraphen-Bataillon 6 (Innsbruck)
- Divisions-Kraftfahr-Abteilung 6 (Bregenz)
