= 6th Separate Guards Cossack Motor Rifle Brigade =

6th Guards Motor Rifle Lisichansk Cossack Brigade named after Matvei Platov (2023-present) 6th Separate Cossack Motor Rifle Regiment (2015-2023) 1st Cossack Regiment (2014-2015)
- 6-я отдельная гвардейская мотострелковая Лисичанская казачья бригада имени Матвея Платова
- Active: 2014-present
- Allegiance: Luhansk People's Republic (2014–2022); Russia (2022–present)
- Branch: Army of the South-East (2014); LPR People's Militia (2014–2022); Russian Ground Forces (2022–present)
- Role: Motor Rifle Brigade
- Size: Regiment (2014-2023); Brigade (2023-Present)
- Part of: 3rd Guards Combined Arms Army
- Patron: Matvei Platov
- Engagements: Russo-Ukrainian War; War in Donbas; Battle of Debaltseve; Invasion of Ukraine; Battle of Popasna; Battle of Lysychansk; 2023 Ukrainian counteroffensive
- Battle honours: Guards

Commanders
- Current commander: Vladimir Polupoltinnykh
- Notable commanders: Pavel Dremov †

Insignia
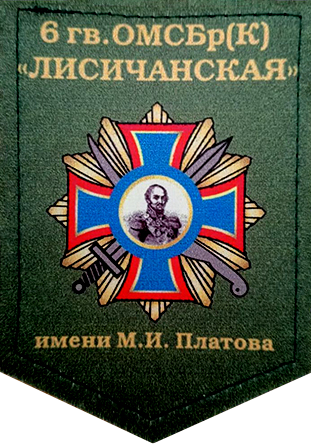
- Unofficial emblem

The 6th Guards Motor Rifle Lisichansk Cossack Brigade named after Matvei Platov (Russian: 6-я отдельная гвардейская мотострелковая Лисичанская казачья бригада имени Матвея Платова, 6 oмсбр; Military Unit Number 69647) is a military unit of the Russian Ground Forces. Until January 1, 2023, it was part of the Luhansk People's Militia. It is attached to the 3rd Guards Combined Arms Army.

== History ==
=== War in Donbas ===
The 6th Separate Cossack Motor Rifle Brigade was formed in 2014 as the 1st Cossack Regiment. It was under the command of Pavel Dremov. On 9 January 2015, the regiment was renamed as the 6th Separate Cossack Motor Rifle Regiment. The regiment would then take part in the Battle of Debaltseve. On 12 December 2015, regiment's commander, Pavel Dremov was killed on a highway near Pervomaisk. Later the regiment was awarded the honorary designation "Guards".

=== Russian invasion of Ukraine ===
The regiment took part in the battle of Lysychansk, where 240 members of the regiment were killed. For the capture of the city the unit was awarded the honorary designation "Lisichansk". In 2023, the regiment was transformed into a brigade and became attached to the 2nd Army Corps. The brigade took part in the 2023 Ukrainian counteroffensive.
