= Pengshan Air Base =

Air base in Sichuan, China

Pengshan Air Base
- Part of People's Liberation Army Air Force
- Pengshan, Sichuan, China

Site information
- Type: Military airfield

Location
- Coordinates: 30°15′53.20″N 103°51′04.41″E

Site history
- Built: 1942
- Battles/wars: World War II

Pengshan Air Base is a People's Liberation Army Air Force (PLAAF) air base, located approximately 1 km east of Gongyi Town, in Pengshan County, Sichuan province, Southwestern China.

Beginning in 1949, it was part of the PLAAF Second Aviation School. The Second Aviation School was established on the basis of the 138th Division. The Third Training Regiment had 16 B-5s and 32 BT-5s (PRC manufactured Ilyushin Il-28s) at Pengshan airfield as late as 1986.

== History ==
Built during World War II, the base was used by the United States Army Air Forces XX Bomber Command 468th Bombardment Group as an airfield to stage Boeing B-29 Superfortress bombing missions from India to attack Japan. It was known by the Americans as Pengshan Airfield (A-7). It was one of four B-29 bases established by the Americans in China.

Staging through Pengshan from its base at Kharagpur Airfield, India, on June 15, 1944, the 468th BG participated in the first USAAF attack on the Japanese Home Islands since the Doolittle Raid in 1942. Operating from bases in India, and at times staging through fields in China, the group struck transportation centers, naval installations, iron works, and aircraft plants in Burma, Thailand, China, Japan, Indonesia, and Formosa. The 468th BG received a Distinguished Unit Citation for bombing iron and steel works at Yawata, Japan, on August 20, 1944.

When the B-29 bombers were moved from India in February 1945 to the newly captured bases in the Mariana Islands, the B-29 use of Pengshan Airfield ended. The Americans used the airfield as a communications station before turning it over to the Chinese government on 30 June 1945.

== See also ==
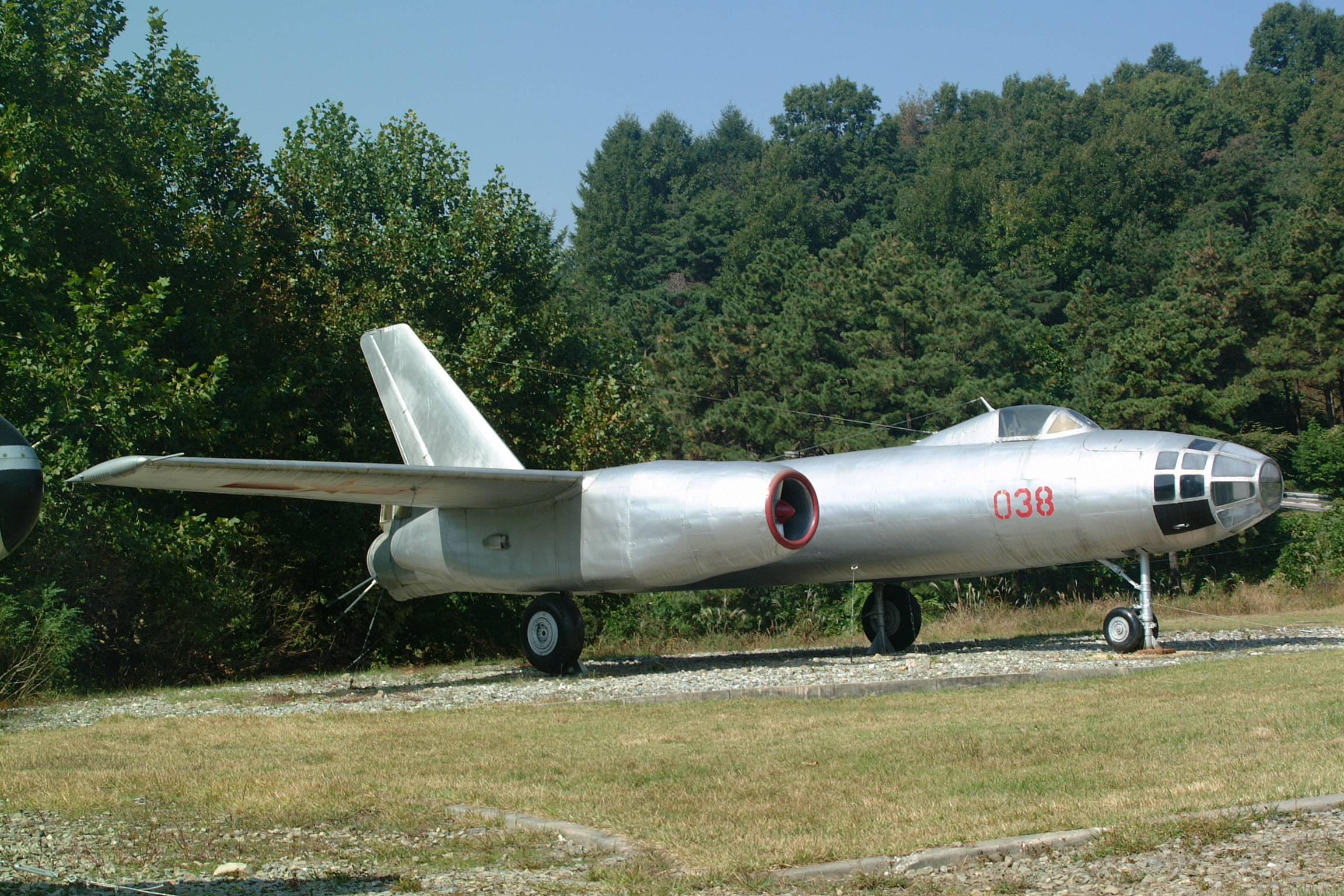
Harbin H-5 as used by the Second Aviation School

- Operation Matterhorn
