= Kalaikunda Air Force Station =

Indian Air Force Station in West Bengal, India

Kalaikunda Air Force Station
- IATA: none; ICAO: VEDX

Summary
- Airport type: Military
- Operator: Eastern Air Command; Andaman and Nicobar Command
- Serves: Indian Air Force
- Location: Kharagpur, West Bengal, India
- Elevation AMSL: 200 ft / 61 m
- Coordinates: 22°20′21.90″N 087°12′52.37″E

Map
- Location of Kalaikunda Air Force Station, India Kalaikunda Air Force Station (India)

Runways
Direction	Length		Surface
Direction	ft	m	Surface
17/35	9,000	2,743	Concrete / Asphalt

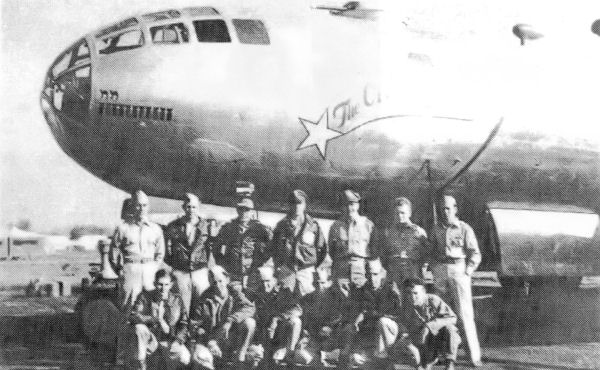
Photo of "The Craig Comet" Bell-Atlanta B-29-15-BA Superfortress 42-63445 of the 794th Bomb Squadron 468th Bomb Wing, Kalaikunda AB, India

Kalaikunda Air Force Station (ICAO: VEDX) is an Indian Air Force Base in Kharagpur, located in the West Midnapur district of the state of West Bengal. It was the home of No. 18 Squadron IAF, the Flying Bullets. The squadron flew the Indian license-built Mikoyan MiG-27ML till its decommissioning in April 2016. A squadron of Su-30 MKIs is now at the base.

== History ==
Air Force Station Kalaikunda was built by the British for the Royal Indian Air Force during World War II. It was used to conduct raids against the advancing Japanese in Burma and also for operations to transport aid to parts of China.

It was originally designed for B-24 Liberator use. In 1943, it was designated as a B-29 Superfortress Base for the planned deployment of the United States Army Air Forces XX Bomber Command to India. Advance Army Air Forces echelons arrived in India in December 1943 to organize the upgrading of the airfield and thousands of Indians labored to upgrade the facility for Superfortress operations. It was one of four B-29 bases established by the Americans in India.

When the XX Bomber Command arrived at Kalaikunda in late March 1944, the conditions at the base were poor, and the runways were still in the process of being lengthened when the first B-29s arrived. Along with Command Headquarters, Kalaikunda was also the headquarters of the 58th Bombardment Wing, which arrived in late April.

The operational B-29 group assigned to Kalaikunda was the 468th Bombardment Group, with the 512th, 792d, 793d, 749th and 795th Bombardment Squadrons.

Initially, the 468th hauled bombs, fuel, ammunition and spareparts 1,200 miles to its forward staging base at Pengshan Airfield (A-7), Pengshan, Szechwan Province, China. Six round trips were necessary to deliver enough fuel for one airplane to mount a combat mission from China — an impractical logistics concept for an aerial campaign, particularly with an airplane plagued with an unreliable engine.

On 5 June 1944, the 468th flew its first operational mission from Kalaikunda against railroad yards at Bangkok, Thailand. Ten days later, flying from field A-7, the 468th bombed the Imperial Iron & Steel Works, Yawata, Japan - the opening of the B-29 phase of the Air Offensive against Japan. Within a year, it participated in eight campaigns and earned three Distinguished Unit Citations.

From June 1944 until May 1945, operating at maximum range, the 468th conducted aerial reconnaissance and bombardment operations from India and China against Japanese targets in Japan, Manchuria, China, Taiwan, Burma, the Malay Peninsula, Singapore and Sumatra. Sixteen-hour combat missions were common; the longest 21. Weather, terrain and the enemy were equally unforgiving. The B-29 was still being "invented" and its operational tactics had to be proved while the airplane was being de-bugged in the face of the enemy.

In July 1944, U. S. Marines invaded the Mariana Islands and as soon as West Field, Tinian, was readied in May 1945, the group flew to West Field and continued the Air Offensive against Japan.

With the departure of the B-29s, the Tenth Air Force 2d Air Commando Group used the airfield. Flying North American O-47s, P-51 Mustangs, C-47 Skytrains and L-5 Sentinel aircraft, the commando unit dropped supplies to Allied troops who were fighting the Japanese in the Chindwin Valley in Burma; moved Chinese troops from Burma to China; transported men, food, ammunition, and construction equipment to Burma; dropped Gurka paratroops during the assault on Rangoon; provided fighter support for Allied forces crossing the Irrawaddy River in February 1945; struck enemy airfields and transportation facilities; escorted bombers to targets in the vicinity of Rangoon; bombed targets in Thailand; and flew reconnaissance missions.

After May 1945 the fighter squadrons were in training; in June the group's C-47s were sent to Ledo to move road-building equipment; during June— July most of its L-5s were turned over to Fourteenth Air Force in China.

== Post Independence ==
By 1956, Kalaikunda had transitioned into a major operational hub for the Indian Air Force, housing frontline squadrons flying aircraft such as the Mystère IV and later the Hawker Hunter. During the 1965 and 1971 Indo-Pak wars, the airbase played a frontline role, launching both offensive and defensive sorties in the eastern theatre. Kalaikunda also served as a training and staging ground for tactical operations, including deployments along the eastern border with East Pakistan (now Bangladesh) '1965 WAR During Indo pak war of 1965 the air force station was repeatedly targeted by No. 14 Squadron PAF stationed at tejgaon , East Pakistan presently Bangladesh No. 14 Squadron's pilots managed to destroy 10 out of the 14 Canberra bombers along with two other types at the IAF base after which they safely returned to base at 07:44am.[10][11][12][13]. In the second strike on Kalaikunda, the squadron managed to destroy 4 to 8 Indian Canberra bombers.

== Current status ==
The airbase at Kalaikunda will play an extremely crucial role in the country's defences. Aircraft based here can assist with air defence over the strategic Andaman and Nicobar Islands and the Bay of Bengal. Andaman and Nicobar Command in the A&N Islands will be in charge of the squadrons of Sukhoi Su-30MKIs and other advanced aircraft based at Kalaikunda for this purpose. This decision was taken when plans for basing Sukhois in the Andamans got scuttled after the 2004 tsunami in which the IAF lost assets. "Till now, Kalaikunda — while performing several other duties — has been a bridge with the Andamans. The role of the base will grow and aircraft based here will play a vital role in patrolling the skies over the Andamans and the Bay of Bengal. Kalaikunda will play several roles that include air defence, training and building better co-operation in the region for a possible NATO-like alliance with India playing the pivotal role," an official said.

The installation has grown steadily in importance over the years. "A large area falls within the responsibility of this base. There are several bases in the northeast but along the eastern coast, the closest one is in Chennai. It is our job to handle the defences along the coast and the Bay of Bengal region. We play host to several foreign air forces interested in joint exercises with the IAF," the official added.

"This is a very compact base built in classical American style. Today, we have a radar station at Salua and Dudhkundi has been converted into an air-to-ground firing range. Over the years, Kalaikunda has developed into a major location for international air exercises. The base is close to the Bay of Bengal where air-to-air firing can take place," says Air Commodore R Radhish, AOC, Air Force Station, Kalaikunda.

But Kalaikunda goes well beyond an exercise hub. Apart from the MiG-27 ground-attack aircraft and MiG-21 Fn fighters of the OCU, squadrons of Su-30 MKIs and other advanced varieties from the IAF's fleet call on Kalaikunda on a regular basis. A squadron of Su-30 MKIs is now at the base.

On 9 October 2007 Singapore signed an agreement with India to base the aircraft and personnel of the Republic of Singapore Air Force for training at the airbase for a period of five years. This agreement was renewed in 2012 and in 2017 both for 5 year periods.

Now Indian Air Force agreed to allow civil aircraft to use the runway at its existing fighter base. According to IAF sources, plans have moved ahead and the civilian terminal might soon start serving not only West Bengal, but also Jharkhand and Odisha. The state government has already engaged an agency that is in touch with us. We have no problems if civilian aircraft use our runway and then move to a separate terminal to the south of the existing military facility. All that needs to be built is a high-speed corridor from the runway to a civilian terminal for which land is available. This corridor will pass under NH6 (Mumbai Road) and the railway tracks in the Kharagpur-Tatanagar section of South Eastern Railway

The Civilian Terminal will be used by Alliance Air for daily flights for Vishakapatnam and Bhubaneshwar from 1 April 2019 under scheme of UDAN III released by the government.

== Base facilities ==
Inside the base, there is a market, bank, film auditorium, hospital and a school, namely, Air Force School, Kalaikunda.

== See also ==
- Operation Matterhorn
