= 6th Regiment =

The 6th Regiment may refer to:

France

- 6th Foreign Infantry Regiment

Greece

- 6th Infantry Regiment (Greece)
- 6th Archipelago Regiment

United States

- 6th Marine Regiment (United States)
- 6th United States Colored Infantry Regiment
- 6th Cavalry Regiment (United States)
- 6th Infantry Regiment (United States)

United Kingdom

- 6th Regiment of Foot (later Royal Warwickshire Fusiliers)
