= Ninth =

Ninth or 9th may refer to:

== Common uses ==
- The ordinal of 9
- One ninth, 1/9, a fraction, one of nine equal parts of a whole
- Ninth of the month, a recurring calendar date
- Ninth grade, in education
- Ninth inning, the last regular period of play in a game of baseball

== Music ==
- Ninth chord
- Ninth (interval)
- Curse of the ninth, superstition in classical music
- Symphony No. 9 (Beethoven)
- Ninth (Peter Murphy album), a 2011 album
- Ninth (The Gazette album), a 2011 album

== Geography ==
- 9th meridian east, a line of longitude
- 9th meridian west, a line of longitude
- 9th parallel north, a circle of latitude
- 9th parallel south, a circle of latitude
- Ninth Avenue (disambiguation)
- Ninth Street (disambiguation)

== Military ==
- Ninth Army (disambiguation)
- 9th Brigade (disambiguation)
- 9th Division (disambiguation)
- 9th Infantry (disambiguation)
- 9th Regiment (disambiguation)
- 9th Squadron (disambiguation)

== See also ==
- 9 (disambiguation)
- 9e, French for 9th
- Nines (disambiguation)
- Number nine (disambiguation)
- Ninth Amendment (disambiguation)
  - Ninth Amendment to the United States Constitution
- 9th century and 9th century BC
- Bottom of the 9th, 1996 video game
- Bottom of the 9th (film), 2019 drama film
- Ninth Doctor, incarnation of the Doctor in Doctor Who
- United States Court of Appeals for the Ninth Circuit
