= 9th Cavalry =

9th Cavalry may refer to:

== Divisions ==
- 9th Cavalry Division (German Empire)
- 9th Cavalry Division (Russian Empire)
- 9th Cavalry Division (Soviet Union)

== Brigades ==
- 9th (Secunderabad) Cavalry Brigade
- 9th Cavalry Brigade (United Kingdom)

== Regiments ==
- 9th Cavalry Regiment (United States)
- 2/9th Cavalry Commando Regiment (Australia)
- 9th Bengal Lancers
- 9th Hodson's Horse

=== American Civil War regiments ===
==== Union Army ====
- 9th Illinois Cavalry Regiment
- 9th Iowa Cavalry Regiment
- 9th Kansas Cavalry Regiment
- 9th Kentucky Cavalry Regiment
- 9th Michigan Cavalry Regiment
- 9th Missouri State Militia Cavalry Regiment
- 9th New York Cavalry Regiment
- 9th Ohio Cavalry Regiment
- 9th Pennsylvania Cavalry Regiment
- 9th Tennessee Cavalry Regiment

==== Confederate Army ====
- 9th Louisiana Cavalry Regiment
- 9th Mississippi Cavalry Regiment
- 9th Texas Cavalry Regiment
- 9th Virginia Cavalry Regiment
- Cobb's Legion, sometimes called the 9th Georgia Cavalry

== See also ==
- 9th Division (disambiguation)
- 9th Brigade (disambiguation)
- 9th Regiment (disambiguation)
- 9th (disambiguation)
