= Ninth Army =

A number of nations have had a Ninth Army:

== Germany ==
- 9th Army (German Empire), a World War I field Army
- 9th Army (Wehrmacht), a World War II field army

== Russia ==
- 9th Army (Russian Empire), a World War I field Army
- 9th Army (RSFSR), a Red Army during the Russian Civil War
- 9th Army (Soviet Union), of the Soviet Union's Red Army was a Soviet field army, active from 1939 – 43, and then after the war from 1966 to 1989
- 9th Air Army
- 9th Guards Army

== Others ==
- 9th Army (France), a field army of the French Army during World War I and World War II
- 9th Army (Italy)
- Ninth Army (Ottoman Empire), one of the field armies of the Ottoman Army formed during World War I
- Ninth Army (United Kingdom), a formation of the British Army during World War II
- Ninth Army (United States), one of the main U.S. Army combat commands used during the campaign in Northwest Europe in 1944 and 1945.

== See also ==
- List of armies by number
- IX Corps (disambiguation)
- 9th Division (disambiguation)
- 9th Brigade (disambiguation)
- 9th Regiment (disambiguation)
- 9th Squadron (disambiguation)
- 9th (disambiguation)
