= IX Corps =

9 Corps, 9th Corps, Ninth Corps, or IX Corps may refer to:

== France ==
- 9th Army Corps (France)
- IX Corps (Grande Armée), a unit of the Imperial French Army during the Napoleonic Wars

== Germany ==
=== German Empire ===
- IX Corps (German Empire), Imperial German Army, prior to and during World War I
- IX Reserve Corps, Imperial German Army, World War I

=== Nazi Germany ===
- 9th Air Corps, Luftwaffe, Wehrmacht
- IX Army Corps (Wehrmacht), World War II
- IX SS Mountain Corps, Waffen-SS, World War II

== Russia and Soviet Union ==
=== Russian Empire ===
- 9th Army Corps (Russian Empire)

=== Soviet Union ===
- 9th Guards Mechanized Corps
- 9th Guards Tank Corps
- 9th Mechanized Corps
- 9th Mixed Aviation Corps
- 9th Rifle Corps
- 9th Tank Corps

== United Kingdom ==
- IX Corps (United Kingdom)

=== Artillery Volunteer Corps ===
- 9th (Tobermory) Argyllshire Artillery Volunteer Corps
- 9th (West Fowey Consols Mine) Cornwall Artillery Volunteer Corps
- 9th (Paignton) Devonshire Artillery Volunteer Corps
- 9th Kent Volunteer Artillery Corps
- 9th (2nd Eastern) Lanarkshire Artillery Volunteer Corps
- 9th (Rousay) Orkney Artillery Volunteer Corps

=== Rifle Volunteer Corps ===
- 9th (Mottram) Cheshire Rifle Volunteer Corps
- 9th (Rye) Cinque Ports Rifle Volunteer Corps
- 9th (Wrexham) Denbighshire Rifle Volunteer Corps
- 9th (High Peak Rifles of Bakewell) Derbyshire Rifle Volunteer Corps
- 9th (Ashburton) Devonshire Rifle Volunteer Corps
- 9th Essex (Silvertown) Rifle Volunteer Corps
- 9th (Dysart) Fife Artillery Volunteer Corps
- 9th (Cirencester) Gloucestershire Rifle Volunteer Corps
- 9th (Glasgow 1st Bankers) Lanarkshire Rifle Volunteer Corps
- 9th (Leicester Town) Leicestershire Rifle Volunteer Corps
- 9th (Marylebone and West Middlesex) Middlesex Rifle Volunteer Corps
- 9th (Kettering) Northamptonshire Rifle Volunteer Corps
- 9th (Cramlington) Northumberland Rifle Volunteer Corps
- 9th Staffordshire Rifle Volunteer Corps
- 9th (Arundel) Sussex Rifle Volunteer Corps
- 9th (London Docks) Tower Hamlets Rifle Volunteer Corps
- 9th (Hull) Yorkshire (East Riding) Rifle Volunteer Corps
- 9th (Market Weighton) Yorkshire (East Riding) Rifle Volunteer Corps

== United States ==
- IX Corps (Union Army), American Civil War
- IX Corps (United States)

== Other countries ==
- 9th Corps (People's Republic of China)
- IX Corps (India)
- IX Army Corps (Italy)
- IX Corps (North Korea)
- IX Corps (Ottoman Empire)
- 9th Corps (Turkey)
- 9th Army Corps (Ukraine)
- 9th Corps (Yugoslav Partisans)

== See also ==
- List of military corps by number
- 9th Army (disambiguation)
- 9th Division (disambiguation)
- 9th Brigade (disambiguation)
- 9th Regiment (disambiguation)
- 9th Squadron (disambiguation)
- 9th (disambiguation)
