= 9th Air Division =

9th Air Division may refer to:

- 9th Air Division (Germany), a division of the Luftwaffe
- 9th Air Division (Japan), a land-based aviation force of the Imperial Japanese Army
- 9th Anti-Missile Defence Division, of the Russian Space Forces
- 9th Assault Ropshinskaya Red Banner, Order of Ushakov Air Division, of Soviet Naval Aviation
- 9th Mixed Air Division, of the Soviet Air Forces (World War II)
- 9th Air Division, the name of the 9th Space Division of the United States Air Force from 1949 to 1958
- 9th Air Division, the name of the 19th Air Division of the United States Air Force from May to November 1945

== See also ==
- 9th Division (disambiguation)
