= 9th Infantry Regiment =

9th Infantry Regiment can refer to:

- 9th Infantry Regiment (Duchy of Warsaw)
- 9th Infantry Regiment (Lithuania)
- 9th Infantry Regiment (United States)
- 9th Infantry Regiment "Bari"
- 9th Bhopal Infantry
- 9th Greek Regiment
- 9th Regiment of Foot
- Infantry Regiment "Soria" No. 9

== See also ==
- 9th Infantry (disambiguation)
- 9th Regiment (disambiguation)
