= 9th Reserve Division =

9th Reserve Division may refer to:

- 9th Reserve Division (People's Republic of China)
- 9th Reserve Division (German Empire)
- 9th Bavarian Reserve Division, German Empire

== See also ==
- 9th Division (disambiguation)
