= 9th Airborne Division =

9th Airborne Division may refer to:

- 9th Parachute Division, Germany
- 9th Airborne Division (India)
- 9th Guards Airborne Division, a formation of the Red Army of the USSR, 1942-45
- 9th Airborne Division (Sudan), a Sudanese military formation
- 9th Airborne Division (United States), a military deception created in 1944

== See also ==
- 9th Division (disambiguation)
