= Operation Boomerang =

United States air raid in Japanese-occupied Dutch East Indies during World War II

- Part of the Pacific War, World War II
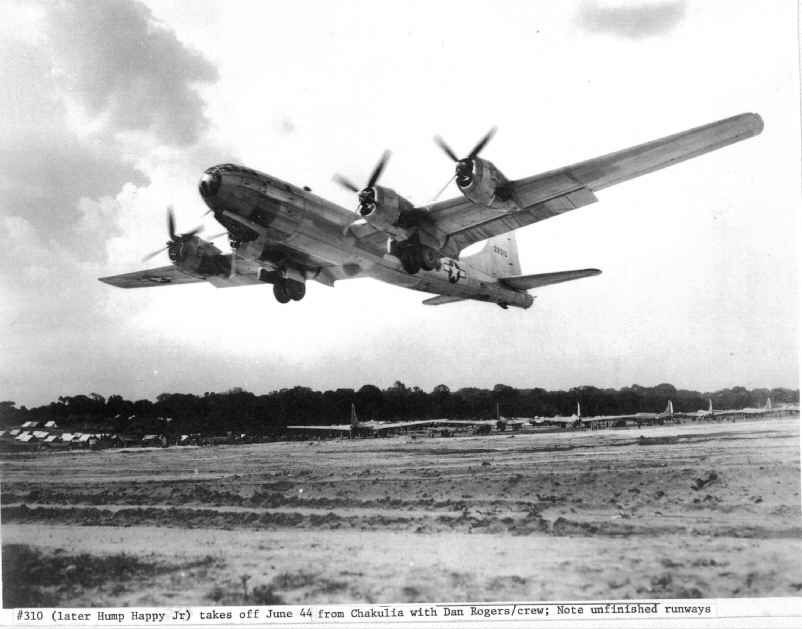
- A XX Bomber Command B-29 Superfortress taking off from an airfield in India during June 1944
Date	10/11 August 1944
Location	Palembang, Dutch East Indies 2°59′10″S 104°45′20″E

Belligerents
United States; United Kingdom	Japan

Units involved
XX Bomber Command; Eastern Fleet	Palembang Defense Unit

Strength
54 aircraft dispatched 39 reached Palembang	Anti-aircraft guns Fighter aircraft

Casualties and losses
1 aircraft 1 killed	1 building destroyed 3 ships sunk 4 ships damaged

Operation Boomerang was a partially successful air raid by the United States Army Air Forces' (USAAF) XX Bomber Command against oil refining facilities in Japanese-occupied Dutch East Indies during World War II. The attack took place on the night of 10/11 August 1944 and involved attempts to bomb an oil refinery at Palembang and lay mines to interdict the Musi River.

The raid formed part of a series of attacks on Japanese-occupied cities in South East Asia that XX Bomber Command conducted as an adjunct to its primary mission of bombing Japan. The command raided the Japanese city of Nagasaki on the same night as Operation Boomerang.

Fifty-four Boeing B-29 Superfortress heavy bombers were dispatched from an airfield in British Ceylon on 10 August, of which 39 reached the Palembang area. Attempts to bomb the oil refinery were largely unsuccessful, only a single building being confirmed destroyed. Mines dropped in the river connecting Palembang to the sea sank three ships and damaged four others. British air and naval forces provided search-and-rescue support for the American bombers. The Japanese antiaircraft guns and fighter aircraft assigned to defend Palembang failed to destroy any of the American bombers, but one B-29 ditched when it ran out of fuel. This was the only USAAF raid on the strategically important oil facilities at Palembang. The oil facilities were attacked by aircraft operating from British aircraft carriers in January 1945.

== Background ==
At the time of the Pacific War, the Sumatran city of Palembang in the Dutch East Indies was a major oil production center. The city and its oil refineries were captured by Japanese forces in mid-February 1942 during the Battle of Palembang. Dutch engineers attempted to wreck the oil refineries during the invasion to prevent the Japanese from being able to use them, but production was restarted by the end of 1942. In early 1944, Allied intelligence estimated that the Pladjoe (Plaju) refinery at Palembang was the source of 22 percent of Japan's fuel oil for ships and industrial facilities, and 78 percent of its aviation gasoline.

In late 1943, the United States Joint Chiefs of Staff approved a proposal to begin the strategic air campaign against the Japanese home islands and East Asia by basing B-29 Superfortress heavy bombers in India and establishing forward airfields in China. The main element of this strategy, designated Operation Matterhorn, was to construct airstrips near Chengdu in inland China which would be used to refuel B-29s traveling from bases in Bengal en route to targets in Japan. Operation Matterhorn was to be conducted by the Twentieth Air Force's XX Bomber Command. The head of the USAAF, General Henry "Hap" Arnold, directly commanded the Twentieth Air Force as he had established it as an independent strategic bombing force which reported to the Joint Chiefs of Staff rather than the combat theater commanders in the Pacific. Brigadier General Kenneth Wolfe led XX Bomber Command. XX Bomber Command conducted its first combat mission, against Bangkok, on 5 June 1944. During this operation, two B-29s ran out of fuel over the Bay of Bengal during the return flight to India and were forced to ditch.

== Planning ==
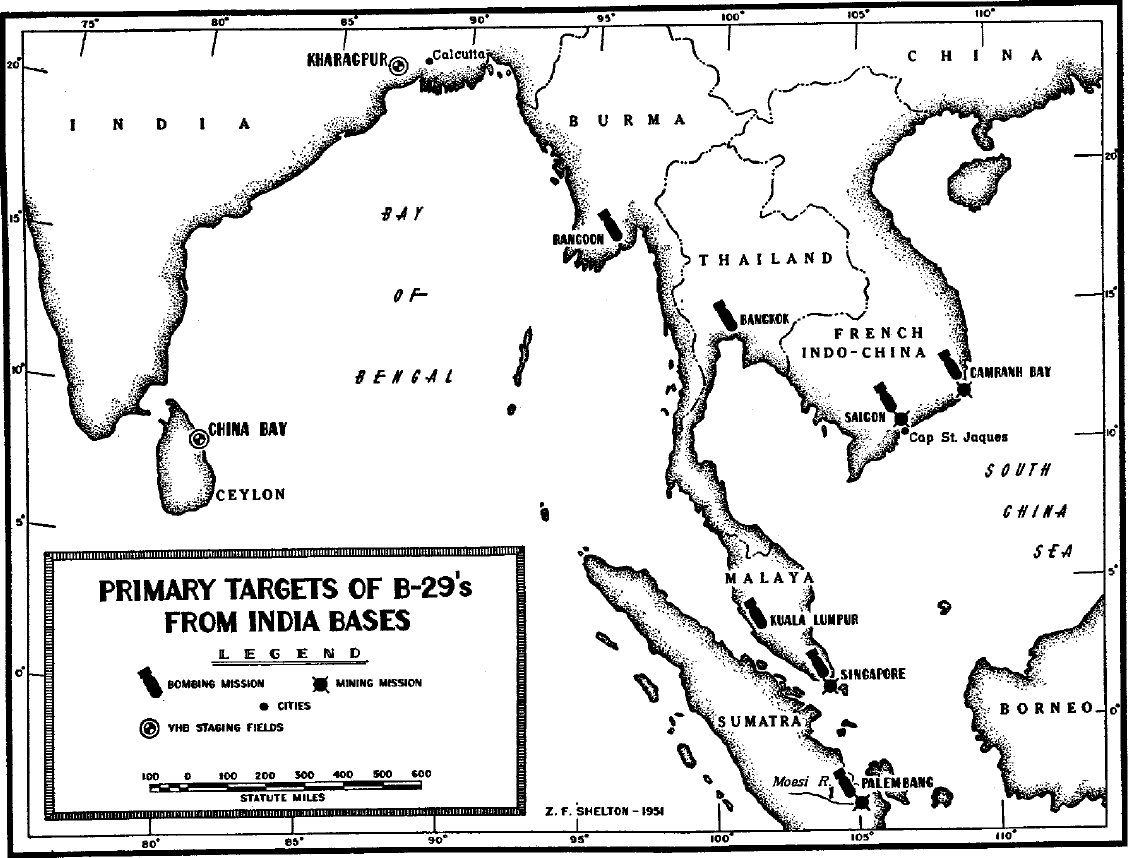
Locations of B-29 bomber bases in India and Ceylon and the main targets they attacked in South East Asia

The attack on Palembang arose from debates concerning how to best utilize the B-29s which preceded the approval of Operation Matterhorn. During late 1943 and early 1944, serious consideration was given to initially using the B-29s to attack merchant shipping and oil facilities in South East Asia from bases in northern Australia and New Guinea. The final plan for Operation Matterhorn approved by the Joint Chiefs of Staff in April specified that while XX Bomber Command would focus on Japan, it was to also attack Palembang. These raids were to be staged through airfields in British Ceylon. The inclusion of Palembang in the plan represented a compromise between the strategists who wanted to concentrate the force against Japan and those who wished to focus it on oil targets. For planning purposes, the date for the first attack on Palembang was set at 20 July 1944.

Infrastructure works were undertaken in Ceylon to support the planned raids on Palembang. In March 1944, work began to modify four airfields on Ceylon to the standards needed for B-29s, RAF China Bay and RAF Minneriya being accorded the highest priority. These two airfields were scheduled to be ready by July. In April, when it became apparent that both could not be completed in time, it was decided to concentrate on China Bay. This airfield was capable of accommodating 56 B-29s by mid-July and was fully operational by the time Operation Boomerang was conducted.

Shortly after XX Bomber Command's first attack on Japan, made against Yawata on the night of 15/16 June, Arnold pressed Wolfe to attack Palembang as part of the follow-up raids. In his reply, Wolfe noted that it would not be possible to do so until 15 July, when the airfield at China Bay was expected to be ready. Arnold issued XX Bomber Command with a new targeting directive on 27 June which specified that 50 B-29s be dispatched against Palembang as soon as the airfield was complete. Wolfe was transferred to a role in the United States on 4 July. Brigadier General LaVern G. Saunders took over the command on a temporary basis. Saunders decided to delay the attack on Palembang until mid-August to enable XX Bomber Command to first make a maximum effort raid on Anshan in China, which Arnold had accorded the highest priority.

== Preparations ==
=== United States ===
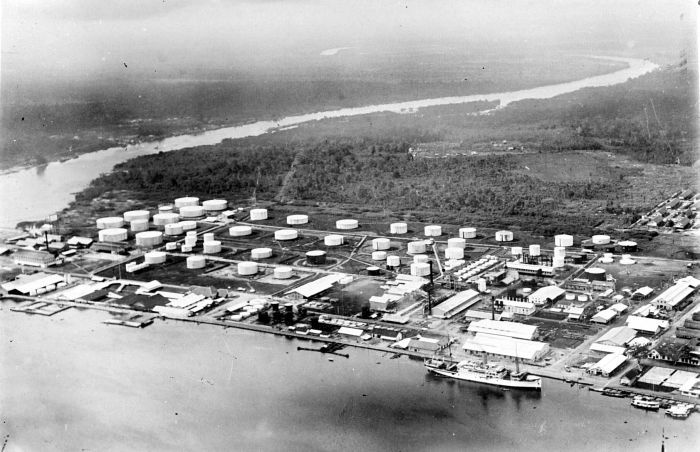
An aerial photo of part of the Pladjoe refinery taken on an unknown date

Planning for the attack on Palembang began in May 1944. Due to the very long distance which was to be flown and the need to stage through Ceylon, the operation required more planning and preparations than any of the other raids conducted by XX Bomber Command. USAAF and British Royal Air Force personnel worked together to complete the preparations. The British supplied fuel for the operation and met the costs of upgrading the Ceylon airfields under Reverse Lend-Lease arrangements. RAF China Bay, including its accommodation facilities and transport vehicles, was virtually given over to the USAAF. The RAF also donated whiskey rations to the Americans.

The plans for the operation evolved over time. The Twentieth Air Force initially ordered that the attack involve all 112 of XX Bomber Command's aircraft, and be conducted during the day. The command sought to have this directive modified on the grounds that dispatching so many aircraft from a single airfield would mean that the force would need to be separated into several waves. Splitting the force in this way would further complicate the operation, and was considered likely to lead to higher losses. Arnold accepted this argument, and the 27 June targeting directive specified that the attack take place either at dawn or dusk. The meteorologist assigned to the operation recommended that the attack be made at night so that the B-29s could take advantage of favorable tailwinds. XX Bomber Command gained the Twentieth Air Force's agreement for this change.

During the period in which the plan was prepared, several US intelligence agencies altered their views regarding the importance of Palembang. The USAAF's Assistant Chief of Air Staff, Intelligence, and the Committee of Operations Analysts judged that the changing tactical situation in the Pacific and heavy losses of Japanese shipping meant that the Pladjoe refinery was no longer of critical importance to the Japanese war effort. XX Bomber Command staff wanted to cancel the mission, which they viewed as a distraction from the main effort against the Japanese steel industry. The Joint Chiefs of Staff continued to require that Palembang be attacked, and Arnold included it in another target directive issued in July. After it was confirmed that the facilities at China Bay would be complete by 4 August, Arnold directed that the raid be conducted by the 15th of the month. The date for the attack was set as 10 August.

Several targets were specified. The primary target was the Pladjoe refinery and the secondary target the nearby Pangkalan refinery. The Indarung Cement Plant at Padang was the last resort target for aircraft unable to reach Palembang. Part of the force was tasked with dropping naval mines to interdict the Musi through which all the oil produced at Palembang was shipped. Due to the extreme range from Ceylon to the targets and back (3,855 miles (6,204 km) to Palembang and 4,030 miles (6,490 km) to where mines were to be dropped into the Musi), the bombers were to be loaded with only 1 short ton (910 kg) of bombs or mines each and have their fuel tanks filled to capacity. Planning for the attack was completed on 1 August. It was designated Operation Boomerang, possibly in the hope that all of the aircraft would return from their long flights.

An attack by XX Bomber Command on the Japanese city of Nagasaki was scheduled to take place on the same night as the raid on Palembang. The USAAF official history states that it was hoped that attacking two targets 3,000 miles (4,800 km) apart would have a psychological impact on the Japanese.

=== Japanese ===
The Imperial Japanese Army was responsible for defending the oil fields on Sumatra against air attack. The Palembang Air Defense Headquarters had been formed in March 1943 for this purpose, and initially comprised the 101st, 102nd and 103rd Air Defense Regiments and the 101st Machine Cannon Battalion. Each of the air defense regiments was equipped with twenty Type 88 75 mm AA guns. They may have also each included a machine cannon battery and a searchlight battery.

In January 1944 the 9th Air Division was established as part of efforts to strengthen Sumatra's air defenses. The Palembang Air Defense Headquarters had been re-designated the Palembang Defense Unit, and was assigned to the 9th Air Division upon that command's formation. At around this time, the unit was expanded to also include fighter aircraft. The 21st and 22nd Fighter Regiments of the Imperial Japanese Army Air Force were responsible for intercepting Allied aircraft. The 101st, 102nd and 103rd Antiaircraft Regiments and 101st Machine Cannon Battalion remained, and had been supplemented by the 101st Antiaircraft Balloon Regiment which operated barrage balloons.

== Attack ==
On the afternoon of 9 August, 56 B-29s from the 444th and 468th Bombardment Groups arrived at RAF China Bay after flying from Bengal. The strike force began to take off from China Bay at 4:45 p.m. on 10 August. A total of 54 B-29s were dispatched. While one of the aircraft returned to the base 40 minutes after taking off due to engine problems, it was repaired within two hours, and took off again bound for Sumatra.

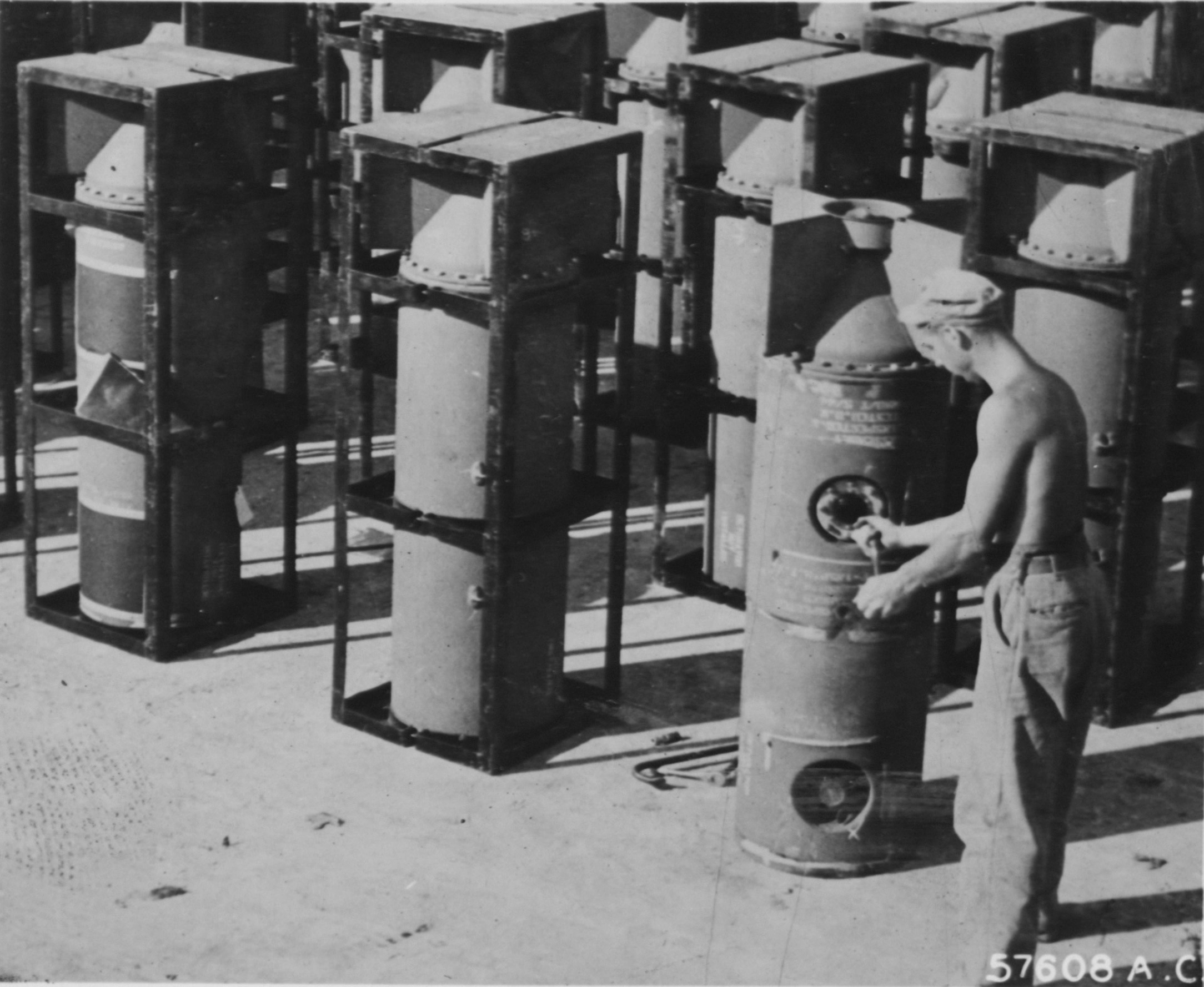
Mines being prepared for Operation Boomerang

The bombers' journey to Sumatra was uneventful. The aircraft flew individually on a direct course from China Bay to Siberoet island off the west coast of Sumatra. Upon reaching Siberoet, the bombers changed course, and headed for the Palembang area. Several British warships from the Eastern Fleet and RAF aircraft were positioned along this route to rescue the crews of any B-29s which were forced to ditch. Royal Navy vessels involved included the light cruiser HMS Ceylon, destroyer Redoubt and submarines Terrapin and Trenchant. The submarines were also used as navigation beacons.

A total of 31 B-29s attempted to bomb the Pladjoe refinery. It proved difficult for their crews to locate the target, as no lights were showing in Palembang, patchy cloud covered the area and the bomber which had been tasked with illuminating the refinery with flares did not reach the area. Instead, the bombardiers aimed their bombs using radar or visual sightings through breaks in the clouds. American airmen reported seeing some explosions and fires, but strike photos taken from the bombers were indistinct. Eight B-29s descended below the clouds to drop two mines each in the Musi River; the accuracy of this attack was assessed as "excellent" in a post-attack report. This was the first time B-29s had been used as minelayers.

Of the fifteen B-29s which failed to reach the Palembang area, three attacked other targets. A pair of B-29s bombed the oil town of Pangkalanbrandan in northern Sumatra and another struck an airfield near the town of Djambi. Several of the bombers which had to turn back did so after running low on fuel.

Japanese forces attacked the B-29s while they were in the Palembang area, without success. Antiaircraft guns and rockets were fired at the bombers, and the American airmen sighted 37 Japanese aircraft. Some of the fighters pursued the bombers for 350 miles (560 km). None of the B-29s were damaged.

One of the B-29s ditched into the sea 90 miles (140 km) from China Bay on its return flight after running out of fuel. Its crew were able to send an SOS signal before ditching, which led Allied forces to conduct an intensive search of the area. One of the bomber's gunners was killed, and the other members of the crew were rescued on the morning of 12 August. While the Allied planners had expected that several B-29s would need to ditch due to fuel shortages, this proved to be the only loss from the operation. The mission lasted about nineteen hours and the mining of the Musi is considered the longest combat mission of the war.

The attack on Nagasaki which was undertaken on the night of 10/11 August in conjunction with Operation Boomerang was unsuccessful. The city was bombed by 24 B-29s, but little damage was inflicted. Two other bombers turned back after departing the forward airfields in China, and three attacked secondary targets. All of the B-29s returned to base.

== Aftermath ==
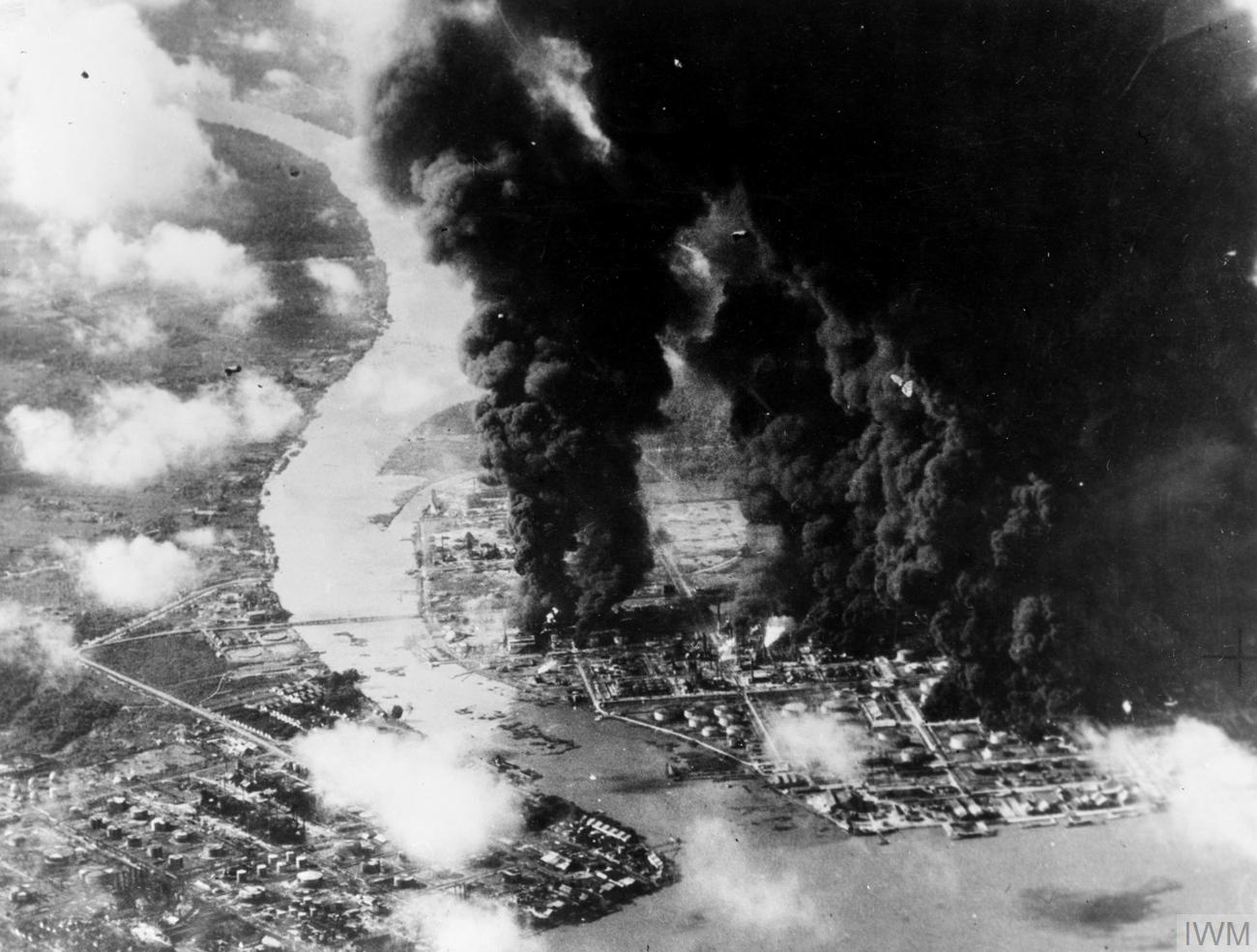
An oil refinery at Palembang on fire after being attacked by the British Royal Navy in January 1945

Operation Boomerang produced mixed results. Photos of the Pladjoe refinery taken on 19 September indicated that a single building had definitely been destroyed in the raid, though several others were assessed as "probables". The mine-laying element of the attack was successful: three ships totalling 1,768 tons were sunk, four others were damaged and the Japanese were unable to transport oil via the Musi River for a month until minesweeping was complete. (Note: Rohwer states that three Japanese tankers and cargo vessels were sunk or damaged by these mines on 11 and 12 August.) Subsequently, B-29s frequently laid mines as part of efforts to blockade Japan. Despite the failure of Operation Boomerang to fully achieve its goals, it demonstrated that XX Bomber Command was now capable of conducting complex operations and the B-29s could safely travel long distances over water.

XX Bomber Command believed that Operation Boomerang had been unsuccessful, based on analysis of post-strike photos. The command continued to be reluctant to attack Palembang and recommended to the Twentieth Air Force on 24 August that its facilities at China Bay be abandoned. Approval to do so was granted on 3 October, though the Twentieth Air Force directed that the aircraft fueling system remain in place. No other B-29 attacks were conducted through Ceylon. The USAAF official history noted that modifying the base for only a single operation was "a glaring example of the extravagance of war". XX Bomber Command attacked several other cities in South East Asia during 1944 and early 1945; these included multiple raids on Japanese-occupied Singapore which required even longer flights than those to reach Palembang.

The Eastern Fleet's aircraft carriers raided oil facilities in Sumatra several times between November 1944 and January 1945. These included two attacks on Palembang conducted as part of Operation Meridian in January 1945. On 24 January the fleet's aircraft badly damaged the Pladjoe refinery, and on the 29th of the month serious damage was inflicted on the nearby Sungai Gerong refinery. The Japanese general who commanded the oil refineries at Palembang stated after the war that these attacks had inflicted much more damage than Operation Boomerang. The British official history states that at the end of March 1945 the refineries' output was only a third.
