= South 9th Street =

South 9th Street may refer to:

- South 9th Street / Theater District (Link station), a Link Light Rail station
- South 9th Street Curb Market, an American food market

== See also ==
- Ninth Street (disambiguation)
