= 9th Guards Brigade =

9th Guards Brigade may refer to:

- 9th Guards Brigade (Croatia)
- 9th Guards Artillery Brigade, Soviet Union/Russia
- 9th Separate Guards Motor Rifle Brigade, Russia

== See also ==
- 9th Brigade (disambiguation)
