= Division No. 9 =

Division No. 9 may refer to:

- Division No. 9, Manitoba, census division in Manitoba
- Division No. 9, Alberta, census division in Alberta
- Division No. 9, Newfoundland and Labrador, census division in Newfoundland and Labrador
- Division No. 9, Saskatchewan, census division in Saskatchewan

== See also ==
- Division No. 9 School
- 9th Division (disambiguation)
