= 9th Infantry =

9th Infantry may refer to:

- 9th Bhopal Infantry, a regiment of the British Indian Army
- 9th Infantry Brigade (Greece)
- 9th Infantry Brigade (United Kingdom)
- 9th Infantry Brigade (Lebanon)
- 9th Infantry Division (Greece)
- 9th Infantry Division (India), a formation of the British Indian Army
- 9th Infantry Division (Philippines)
- 9th Infantry Division (Poland)
- 9th Infantry Division (South Korea)
- 9th Infantry Division (United States)
- 9th Infantry Regiment (United States)

== See also ==
- 9th Brigade (disambiguation)
- 9th Division (disambiguation)
