= 9th Division =

9th Division, 9th Infantry Division or 9th Armoured Division may refer to:

== Infantry divisions ==
- 9th Division (Australia)
- 9th Infantry Division (Bangladesh)
- 9th Infantry Division (Belgium)
- 9th Division (People's Republic of China)
- 9th Reserve Division (People's Republic of China)
- 9th Colonial Infantry Division, France
- 9th Division (German Empire)
- 9th Reserve Division (German Empire)
- 9th Bavarian Reserve Division, World War I
- 9th Landwehr Division, German Empire
- 9th Infantry Division (Wehrmacht), Germany
- 9th Luftwaffe Field Division, Germany)
- 9th Mountain Division (Wehrmacht), Germany
- 9th Infantry Division (Greece)
- 9th (Secunderabad) Division, British Indian Army, before and during World War I
- 9th Infantry Division (India)
- 9th Division (Imperial Japanese Army)
- 9th Division (Japan)
- 9th Division (North Korea)
- 9th Infantry Division (Ottoman Empire)
- 9th Infantry Division (Philippines), Spear Division
- 9th Infantry Division (Poland)
- 9th Infantry Division (Russian Empire)
- 9th Siberian Rifle Division, Russian Empire
- 9th Singapore Division
- 9th Division (South Africa)
- 9th Infantry Division (South Korea)
- 9th Division (South Vietnam)
- 9th Don Rifle Division, Soviet Union
- 9th Guards Rifle Division, Soviet Union
- 9th Infantry Division (Soviet Union)
- 9th Infantry Division (Thailand)
- 9th (Scottish) Division, World War I
- 9th (Highland) Infantry Division, World War II
- 9th Infantry Division (United States)
- 9th Division (Vietnam)
- 9th Division (Yugoslav Partisans)

== Airborne divisions ==
- 9th Parachute Division (Germany)
- 9th Airborne Division (India)
- 9th Airborne Division (Sudan)
- 9th Guards Airborne Division, Soviet Union
- 9th Airborne Division (United States)

== Motorized divisions ==
- 9th Motorized Division, France
- 9th Infantry Division "Pasubio", Kingdom of Italy
- 9th Guards Motor Rifle Division, Soviet Union

== Cavalry divisions ==
- 9th Cavalry Division (German Empire)
- 9th Cavalry Division (Russian Empire)

== Armoured divisions ==
- 9th Panzer Division (Wehrmacht), Germany
- 9th SS Panzer Division Hohenstaufen, Germany
- 9th Armoured Division (Greece)
- 9th Armoured Division (Iraq)
- 9th Tank Division (People's Republic of China)
- 9th Guards Tank Division, Soviet Union
- 9th Tank Division (Soviet Union)
- 9th Armoured Division (Syria)
- 9th Armoured Division (United Kingdom)
- 9th Armored Division (United States)

== Aviation divisions ==
- 9th Air Division (Germany)
- 9th Air Division (Japan)
- 9th Bombardment Division, United States
- 9th Space Division, United States

== Other divisions ==
- 9th Flak Division, Wehrmacht, Germany
- 9th Special Forces Division of Aleppo, Syrian rebel group
- 9th Naval Surface Ships Division (Ukraine)
- 9th Anti-Aircraft Division (United Kingdom)

== See also ==
- Division No. 9 (disambiguation)
- Ninth Army (disambiguation)
- IX Corps (disambiguation)
- 9th Brigade (disambiguation)
- 9th Regiment (disambiguation)
- 9 Squadron (disambiguation)
