= Palembang Defense Unit =

- Active: 1943–1945
- Country: Japan
- Branch: Imperial Japanese Army
- Role: Air defense
- Part of: 9th Air Division
- Engagements: World War II: Operation Boomerang; Operation Meridian

The Palembang Defense Unit was an Imperial Japanese Army formation established to protect the oil facilities at Palembang from air attack during the Japanese occupation of the Dutch East Indies. Formed in March 1943, it was initially designated the Palembang Air Defense Headquarters.

== History ==
The Palembang Air Defense Headquarters was established in March 1943 and initially comprised the 101st, 102nd and 103rd Air Defense Regiments and the 101st Machine Cannon Battalion. Each of the air defense regiments was equipped with 20 Type 88 75 mm AA guns. They may have also each included a machine cannon battery and a searchlight battery.

In January 1944 the 9th Air Division was established as part of efforts to strengthen Sumatra's air defenses. By this time the Palembang Air Defense Headquarters had been re-designated the Palembang Defense Unit, and was assigned to the 9th Air Division upon that command's formation. This unit was expanded to include both fighter aircraft and antiaircraft gun units. The 21st and 22nd Fighter Regiments of the Imperial Japanese Army Air Force were responsible for intercepting Allied aircraft. The 101st, 102nd and 103rd Antiaircraft Regiments and 101st Machine Cannon Battalion remained, and had been supplemented by the 101st Antiaircraft Balloon Regiment which operated barrage balloons.

The Palembang Defense Unit failed to damage any of the American B-29 Superfortress bombers which attacked the city during the Operation Boomerang raid on the night of 10/11 August 1944. It also saw combat during the British Operation Meridian carrier air attacks on Palembang during January 1945.
