= Ninth of the month =

Recurring ordinal calendar date

The ninth of the month or ninth day of the month is the recurring calendar date position corresponding to the day numbered 9 of each month. In the Gregorian calendar (and other calendars that number days sequentially within a month), this day occurs in every month of the year, and therefore occurs twelve times per year.

- Ninth of January
- Ninth of February
- Ninth of March
- Ninth of April
- Ninth of May
- Ninth of June
- Ninth of July
- Ninth of August
- Ninth of September
- Ninth of October
- Ninth of November
- Ninth of December

In addition to these dates, this date occurs in months of many other calendars, such as the Bengali calendar and the Hebrew calendar.

== See also ==
- Ninth (disambiguation)
