= USS Mississippi (CGN-40) =

1976 United States Navy cruiser

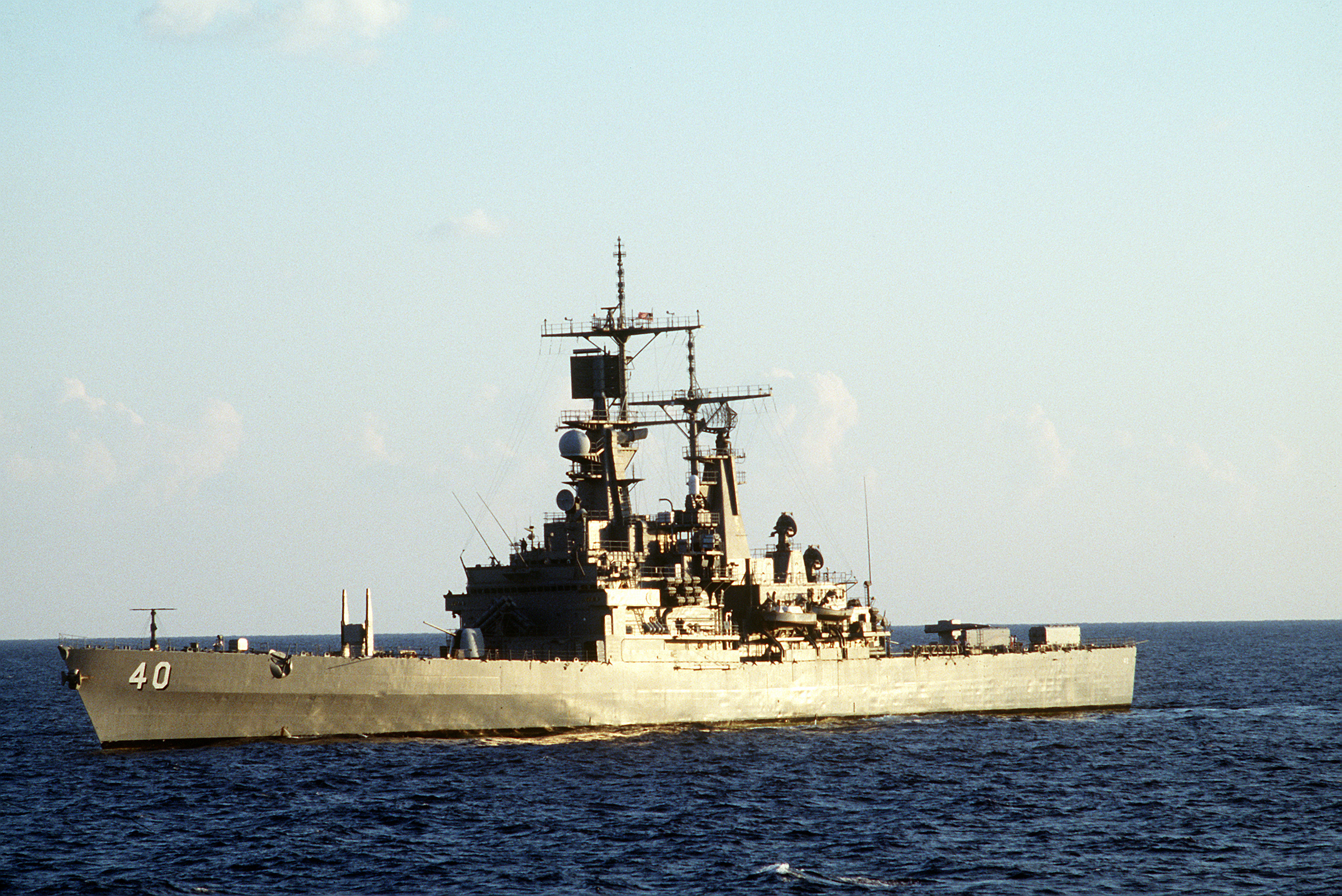
- USS Mississippi on 21 January 1991

History

United States
- Name: Mississippi
- Namesake: State of Mississippi
- Ordered: 21 January 1972
- Builder: Newport News Shipbuilding and Drydock Company
- Laid down: 22 February 1975
- Launched: 31 July 1976
- Sponsored by: Janet Finch
- Acquired: 14 July 1978
- Commissioned: 5 August 1978
- Decommissioned: 28 July 1997
- Stricken: 28 July 1997
- Identification: Callsign: NGGD; Hull number: CGN-40
- Motto: Virtute et armis; (By valor and arms)
- Fate: Recycling completed
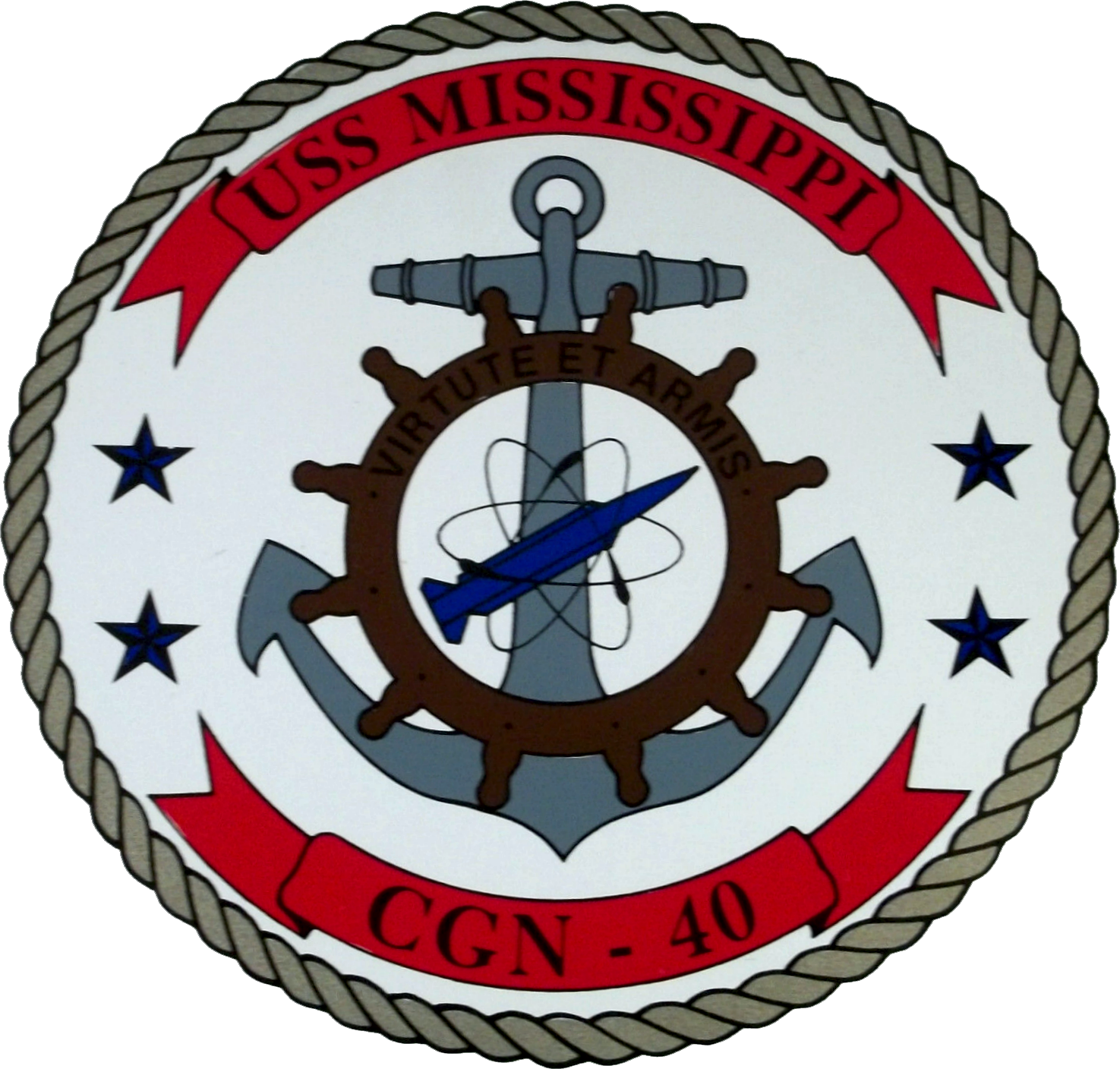
- Badge

General characteristics
- Class & type: Virginia-class cruiser
- Displacement: 11,300 tons full load
- Length: 585 ft (178 m)
- Beam: 63 ft (19 m)
- Draft: 31.5 ft (9.6 m)
- Propulsion: Twin D2G General Electric nuclear reactors
- Speed: +30 knots (56 km/h; 35 mph)
- Range: Nuclear
- Complement: 39 officers, 539 enlisted
- Sensors & processing systems: AN/SPS-48 3-D Air search radar; AN/SPS-49 2-D Air search radar; AN/SPS-55 surface search radar; AN/SPQ-9 gun fire control radar; AN/SPG-51 Missile fire control radar
- Electronic warfare & decoys: AN/SLQ-32; Mark 36 SRBOC
- Armament: -Two Mk 26 dual-arm missile launchers for Standard missile (SAMs) and/or "matchbox" ASROC anti-submarine rockets (68 missiles); -Two Mk 141 Harpoon missile launchers; -Two armored ASM/LAM launchers for Tomahawk missile; -Two triple-tube Mk 46 torpedo launchers; -Two Mk 45 (5-inch/54-caliber) lightweight guns; -Two Phalanx CIWS (20 mm) anti-missile systems; -Four machine guns
- Aircraft carried: As built: Helicopter pad (Afterdeck) with hangar / elevator – until later retrofit to Tomahawk launchers.

USS Mississippi (CGN-40), a Virginia-class nuclear-powered guided-missile cruiser, was the fourth ship of the United States Navy named in honor of the 20th state admitted to the Union. Her keel was laid down by the Newport News Shipbuilding and Drydock Company at Newport News, Virginia, on 22 February 1975. She was launched on 31 July 1976. The ship was commissioned on 5 August 1978 by Jimmy Carter, then serving as the 39th president of the United States. Early deployment included escorting the carrier USS Nimitz. She also was deployed in 1989 as a response to the capture and subsequent murder of U.S. Marine Corps Colonel William R. Higgins by terrorists.

== Ship history ==
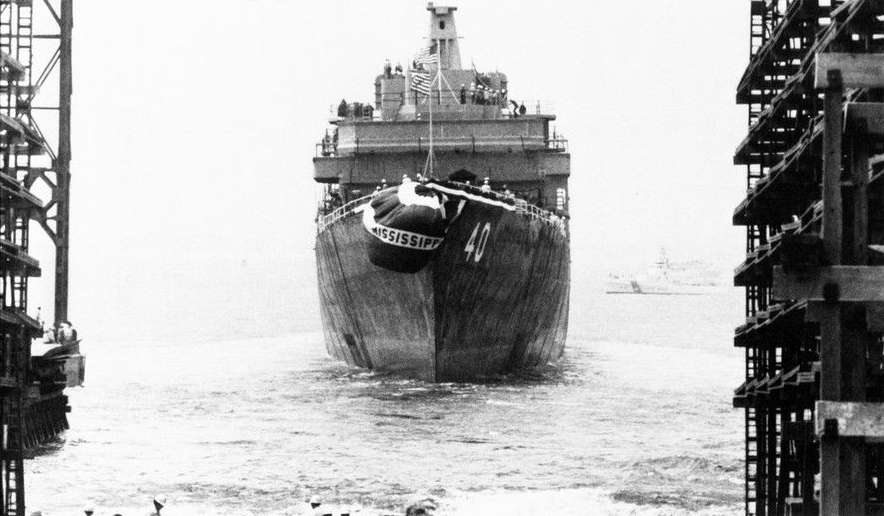
Mississippi is launched from Newport News in July 1976

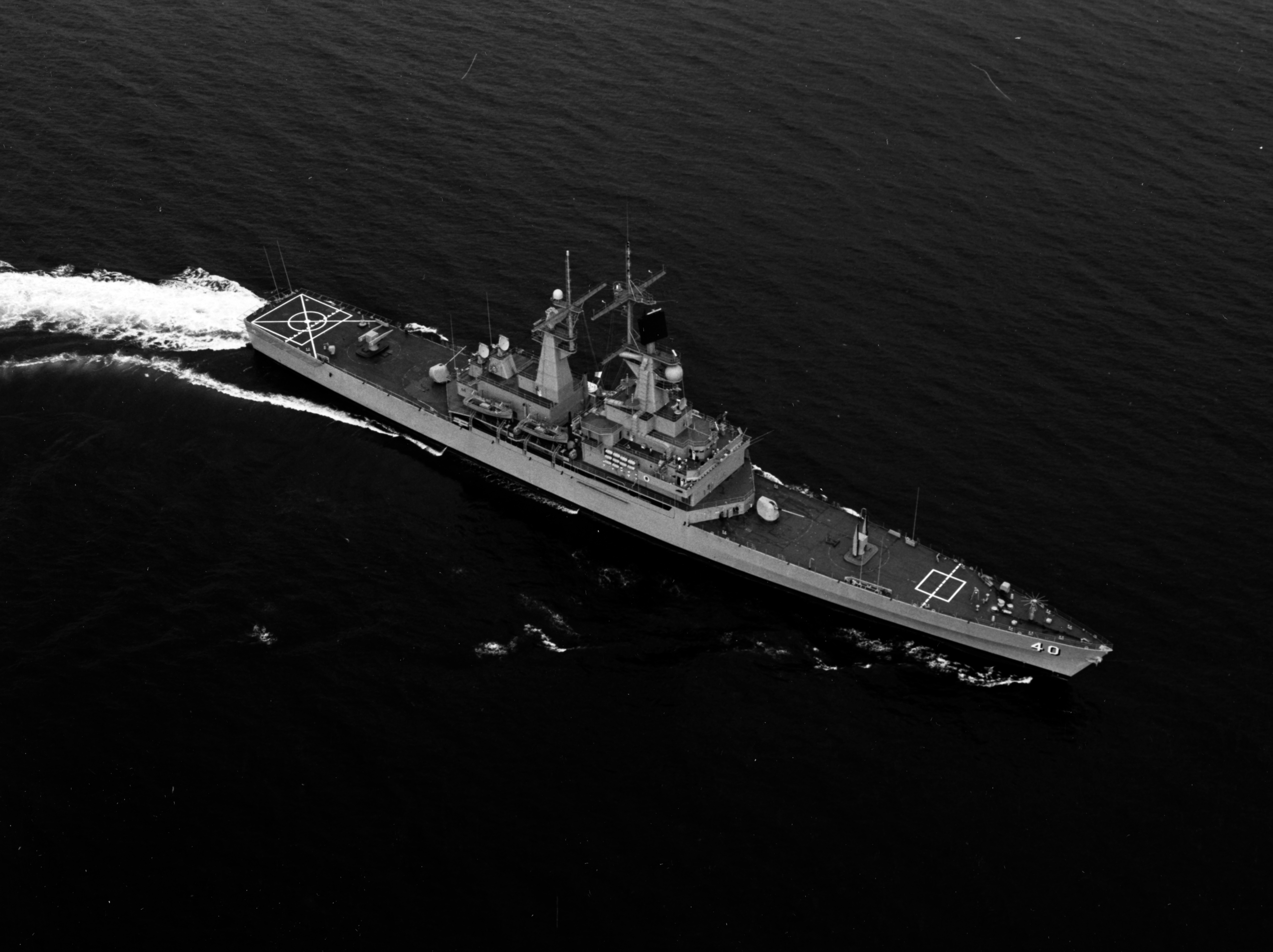
Mississippi working up in the Atlantic in 1978, shortly after her commissioning

Mississippi (DLGN 40) was laid down on 22 February 1975 at Newport News, Virginia, by Newport News Shipbuilding & Dry Dock Co.; reclassified as a guided missile cruiser and designated CGN 40 on 30 June 1975; launched on 31 July 1976; sponsored by Miss. Janet H. Finch, daughter of Governor Charles C. Finch of Mississippi; and, in ceremonies attended by President James E. [Jimmy] Carter, Jr., Secretary of Defense Harold Brown, and Senator John C. Stennis of Mississippi, was commissioned at Norfolk, Virginia, on 5 August 1978.

Mississippi conducted her shakedown cruise to Caribbean and South American waters (8 January–13 February 1979), then made her first deployment—to the Sixth Fleet in the Mediterranean – (3 August 1981 – 12 February 1982) during a confrontation between the United States and Libya. She operated as part of the screen for aircraft carriers Nimitz and Forrestal during the Gulf of Sidra incident. Mississippi fired three RIM-66B Standard SM-1 surface-to-air missiles during a live-fire exercise.

While Mississippi steamed with Nimitz and guided missile cruiser Arkansas off the coast of Lebanon, she received a distress call from Greek cargo vessel Andalusia, at 00:30 on 3 December 1982). Crew 11, a Lockheed P-3C Orion from VP-49, vectored Mississippi to Andalusia and the cruiser rescued all 19 crewmembers. Two Sikorsky Sea Kings from HS-9 operating from Nimitz transferred survivors from Mississippi to the carrier. Mississippi's chief engineer and damage control assistant inspected Andalusia but determined that her damage precluded salvage, and the ship sank at 08:24, 1,200 yards off the port bow of the cruiser in 195 fathoms (36°1'N, 12°19'2"E).

On 1 August 1989 Arab terrorists in Beirut, Lebanon, kidnapped and hanged Lt. Col. William R. Higgins, USMC, a member of the UN peacekeeping forces in Lebanon, and threatened to murder additional hostages they held. The carrier America departed early from a visit to Singapore and made for the Arabian Sea, and Coral Sea steamed from Alexandria, Egypt, to the Eastern Mediterranean as a show of force. Mississippi had deployed as part of the Sixth Fleet's Med 3–89 Battle Force and was visiting Haifa, Israel, when the crisis began. She emergency sortied and operated as the battle group's Composite Warfare Coordinator for anti-surface warfare off the Lebanese littoral throughout the remainder of the month. Midway had originally been scheduled to participate in Pacific Exercise-89, but sailed to fill a carrier commitment in the Indian Ocean, where she operated until mid-October.

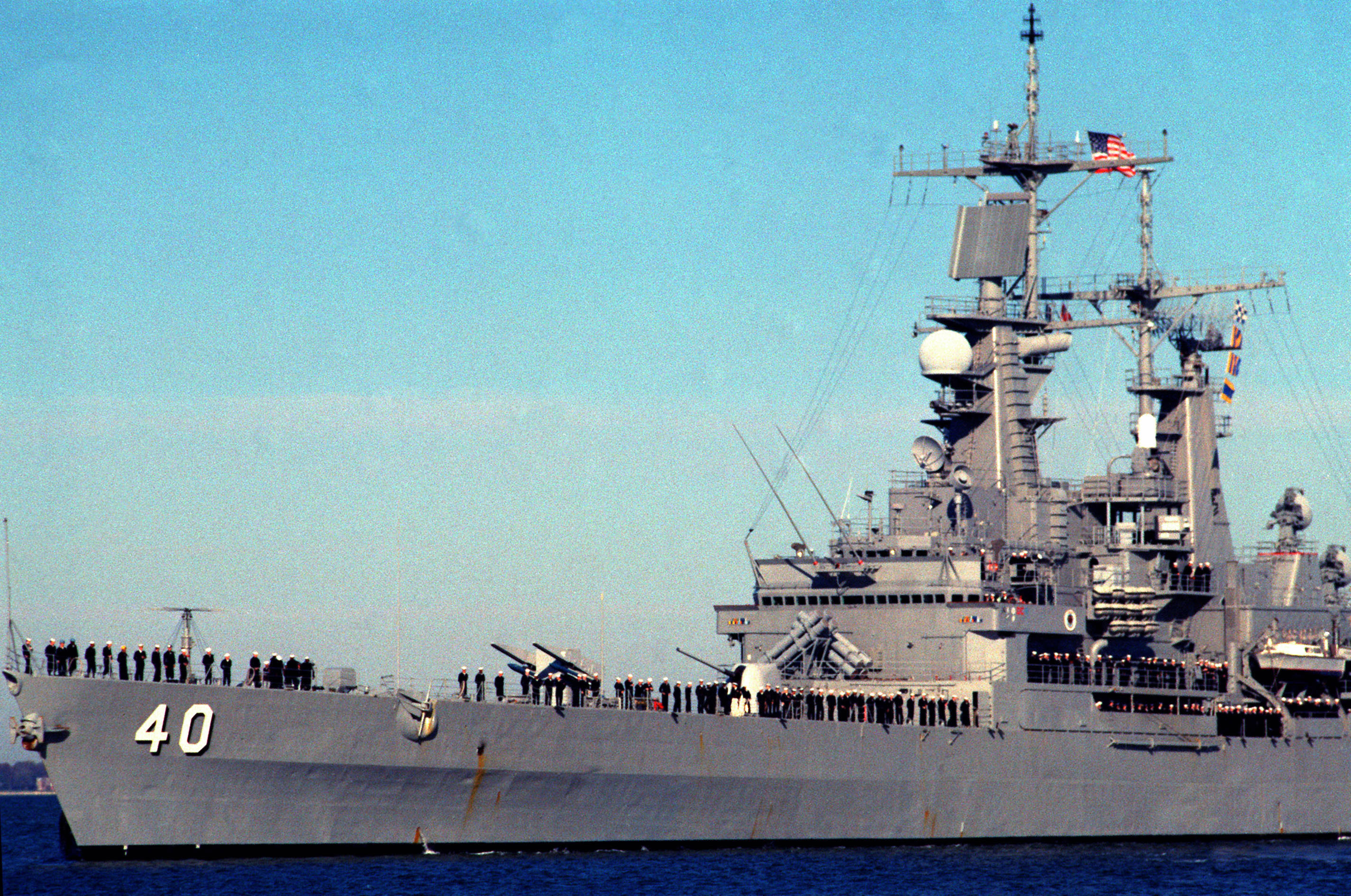
Mississippi returns to Norfolk in November 1989 at the end of a six-month cruise to the Mediterranean

Mississippi deployed with the John F. Kennedy Battle Group to the Mediterranean for Operations Desert Shield/Storm (16 August 1990 – 28 March 1991). She escorted the carrier Theodore Roosevelt, which broke with her conventionally fueled battle group upon exiting the Suez Canal. These two ships travelled at flank speed the length of the Red Sea and through the Bab-el-Mandeb into the Gulf of Aden arriving on (15 January). The importance of that day and break-neck speed to arrive on it was due to uncertainty about Yemen's position on the war, getting the carrier beyond shore batteries and short range patrol boats in the narrow straights was a priority before hostilities could commence on (16 January). Mississippi then waited off the coast of Yemen to escort the engine room troubled Nitro through the Bab-el-Mandeb (18 January) and out beyond the Gulf of Aden. As an ammunition ship, Nitro was needed for battleship shore battery and amphibious landing support. Once escort duty was complete Mississippi made flank speed to her launch position in the northern Red Sea. Mississippi fired three BGM-109 Tomahawk Land Attack Missiles (TLAMs) at Iraqi strategic and military targets (25 January 1991) and two more the following day. One Tomahawk failed after launch and landed in the sea after a short erratic flight. The ship then operated as the local anti-air warfare screen commander for the Red Sea Battle Force (27 January – 24 February).

Following the Haitian Army's overthrow of President Jean-Bertrand Aristide (September 1991), a succession of governments led to sectarian violence. The UN authorized force to restore order and the U.S. initiated Operations Support Democracy and Uphold/Restore Democracy—Uphold Democracy for a peaceful entry into Haiti, and "Restore Democracy" in the event of resistance. Mississippi enforced the embargoes imposed upon Haiti as part of "Support Democracy" (14 July – 3 August). The deteriorating situation then (12 September 1994) prompted the dispatch of a multinational force that included the carriers America and Dwight D. Eisenhower—about 1,800 soldiers of the Army's XVIII Airborne Corps embarked on board Dwight D. Eisenhower. The Haitians agreed to allow the Americans to land peacefully, and (31 March 1995) the U.S. transferred peacekeeping functions to international forces. The crisis marked the first deployment operationally of Army helicopters on board a carrier in lieu of most of an air wing.

NATO and the UN carried out Operations: Provide Promise to provide humanitarian relief for people displaced by the fighting in former Yugoslavia (2 July 1992 – 9 January 1996); Deny Flight to monitor the air space over Bosnia-Herzegovina to prevent the warring parties from using their air strength (12 April 1993 – 21 December 1995); and Sharp Guard to enforce the arms embargo against the combatants (15 June 1993 – 2 October 1996). Mississippi served as Red Crown—coordinating air operations—in the Maverick Operating Area in the Adriatic Sea (2–18 April, 14–21 May, 11–21 June, 30 June – 9 July, 22–27 July, and 22 August–6 September 1995). In addition, the cruiser intercepted Polish vessel Dajti, and her boarding team boarded and inspected the Eastern European ship as a possible smuggler (7 April).

Two Cuban Mikoyan Gurevich MiG-29UB Fulcrums shot down two Cessna 337 Skymasters flown by the "Brothers to the Rescue," a non-profit organization opposed to the Cuban government of Fidel Castro, over contested international waters (24 February 1996). Mississippi led a surface action group that included guided missile cruiser Ticonderoga and guided missile frigate John L. Hall during Operations Sentinel Lifeguard, Standoff IV, and Escort 1–96 in the Straits of Florida in response to the Cubans' downing the Skymasters (25–28 February and 1–7 March). In addition, the group escorted a civilian flotilla that laid a wreath on the water where the victims fell.

== Decommissioning ==
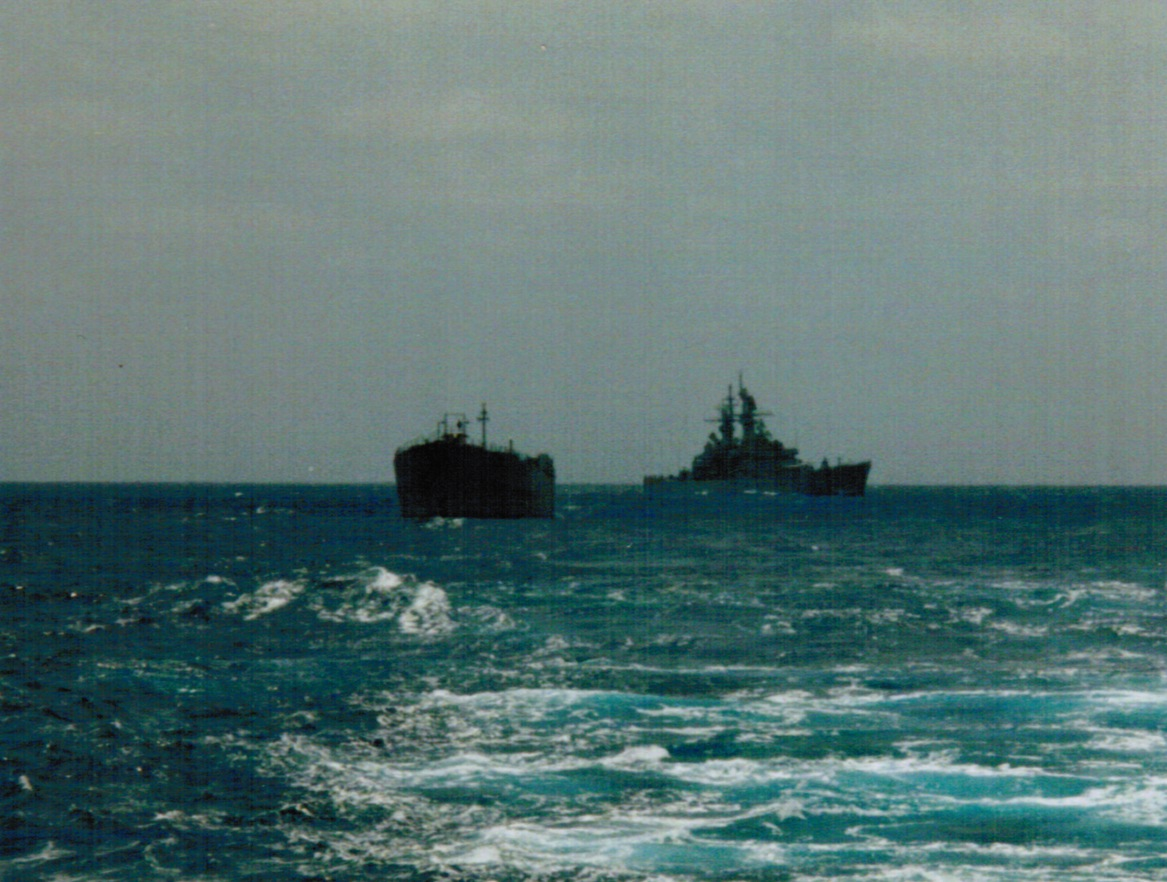
Decommissioned CGN-40 under tow

By 1995 it was determined her nuclear reactors would need to be refueled, but cuts in the Navy budget ruled out the refueling overhaul the ship would need to continue in service. After serving just 18 years in commissioned service, Mississippi was deactivated on 6 September 1996 at Norfolk and was decommissioned and struck from the Naval Vessel Register on 28 July 1997. The ship was prepared and then towed from Norfolk, Virginia, to Bremerton, Washington, via the Panama Canal from March 1998 to May 1998. The Military Sealift Command fleet tug USNS Mohawk executed the initial tow until the decommissioned cruiser was moored at Rodman Naval Station, Panama. The Pacific tow was completed by USNS Navajo to the Naval Sea Systems Command Inactive Ships Onsite Maintenance Office, Puget Sound Naval Shipyard, Bremerton, Washington.

Mississippi entered the Nuclear Powered Ship and Submarine Recycling Program around October 2004 and recycling was completed 30 November 2007.

In 2003, the ship's main mast was installed at the Vietnam Veteran's Memorial in Ocean Springs, Mississippi.

== See also ==
- Nuclear powered cruisers of the United States Navy
