= Division No. 9 School =

- U.S. National Register of Historic Places
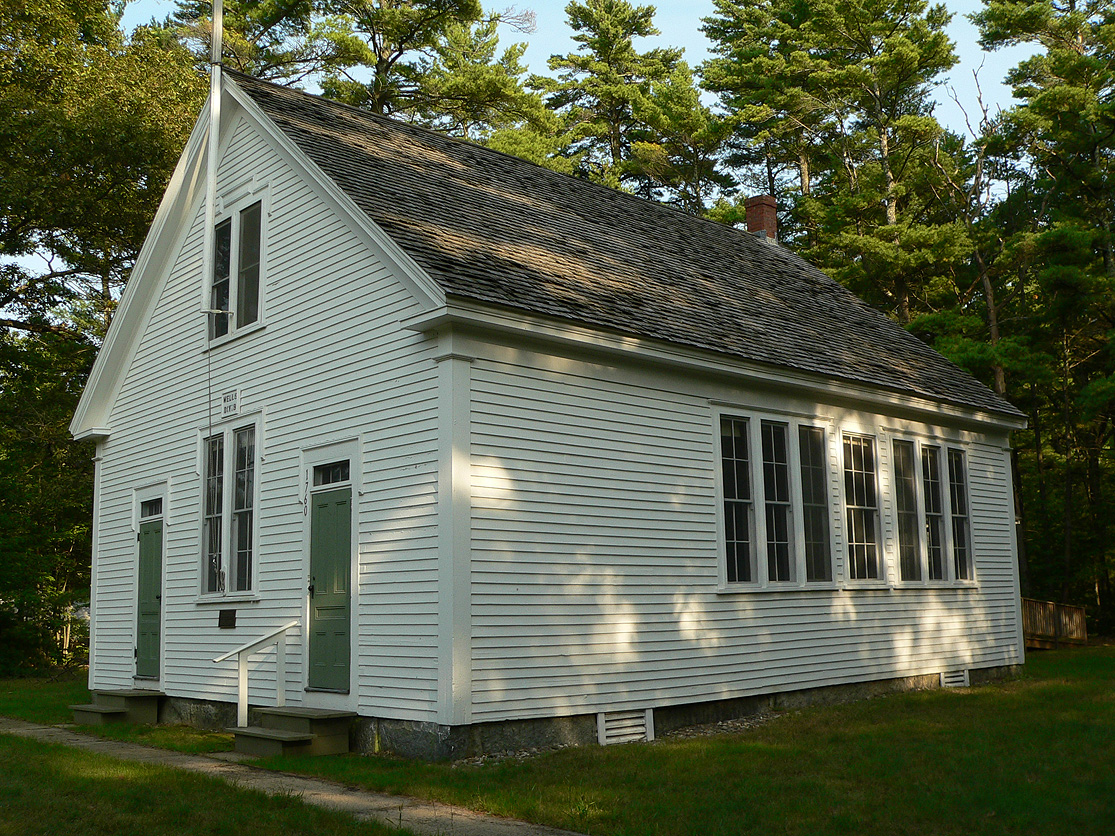

- Location within Maine Location within the United States
- Nearest city: Wells, Maine
- Coordinates: 43°18′23″N 70°41′27″W
- Area: less than one acre
- Built: 1900
- Built by: Leander J. Littlefield
- NRHP reference No.: 95001463
- Added to NRHP: December 14, 1995

The Division No. 9 School is a historic former one-room schoolhouse on Maine State Route 9 in Wells, Maine. Built in 1900, it is the best-preserved of the town's surviving district school buildings, and is now a museum owned by the town. It was listed on the National Register of Historic Places in 1995.

== Description and history ==
The Division No. 9 School is located on the south side of Maine State Route 9 in rural southwestern Wells, east of its junction with Bragdon Road. It is set on a small grassy lot surrounded by forest. It is a single-story wood-frame structure with a front-facing gable roof, clapboard siding, and a granite foundation. The front facade has a pair of matching entrances flanking a doubled sash window at the center, with a slightly smaller similar window pair in the gable above. The doors are topped by transom windows, and both doors and windows have drip molding caps. The west facade has two groups of three sash windows flanking a single sash window, and the east facade has two sash windows. The south side of the building has a shed-roof ell, which contains the building's bathrooms and a woodshed. The interior of the building is well preserved, with tongue-and-groove wainscoting in both the entrance vestibules and the classroom.

The school was built in 1900 by a local contractor for a total cost (including land) of $873.72; the ell was added in 1917 for $300. The previous school for this district had been located across the street. This school remained in service until 1948, and was designated a local landmark in 1992. It is the best-preserved of nine surviving district schoolhouses in the town.

== See also ==
- National Register of Historic Places listings in York County, Maine
