= Ninth Amendment =

Ninth Amendment may refer to the:

- Ninth Amendment to the United States Constitution, part of the Bill of Rights
- Ninth Amendment of the Constitution of India, 1961 amendment allowing transfer of territory to Pakistan in Berubari, West Bengal following certain treaties between the countries including the Nehru-Noon Agreement relating to India-East Pakistan enclaves
- Ninth Amendment of the Constitution of Ireland, extended the right to vote to certain non-citizens
- Ninth Amendment of the Constitution of South Africa
