= Helicopter Anti-Submarine Squadron 9 =

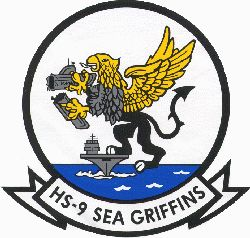
- HS-9 insignia
- Active: 1st squadron: 1 June 1956 - 1 October 1968 2nd squadron: 4 June 1976 – 30 April 1993
- Country: United States
- Branch: United States Navy
- Type: Helicopter squadron
- Role: Anti-submarine warfare
- Part of: Not active
- Nickname: "Sea Griffins"
- Engagements: Operation Desert Storm

Helicopter Anti-Submarine Squadron 9 (HS-9) was the designation of two helicopter antisubmarine warfare squadrons of the United States Navy. The first squadron bearing the designation HS-9 was established on 1 June 1956 at Naval Air Station Quonset Point, Rhode Island with five HSS-1N “Seabat” helicopters. The squadron was disestablished on 1 October 1968. Eight years later, a new squadron was established on 4 June 1976; it was also designated HS-9. It deployed eight Sikorsky SH-3H “Sea Kings”. That squadron was disestablished on 30 April 1993.

The second squadron designated HS-9 saw combat in the Middle East during the 1990–1991 Gulf War and deployed around the globe, including the Arctic Circle and Cape Horn. The squadron also appeared on the silver screen in the movie The Final Countdown.

The "Sea Griffins" adopted a uniform patch design that included a Griffin standing on the deck of an aircraft carrier breaking a submarine into two pieces.

== History ==
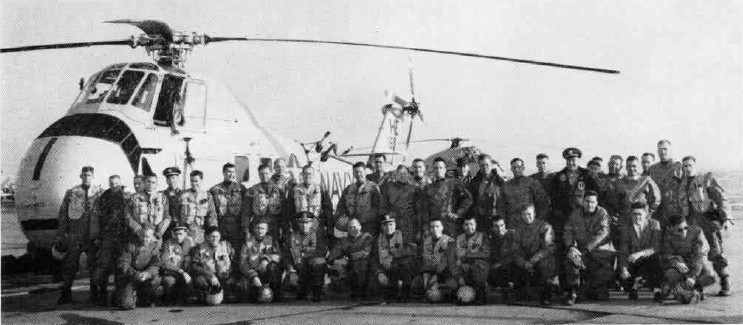
HS-9 in 1958 aboard USS Leyte.

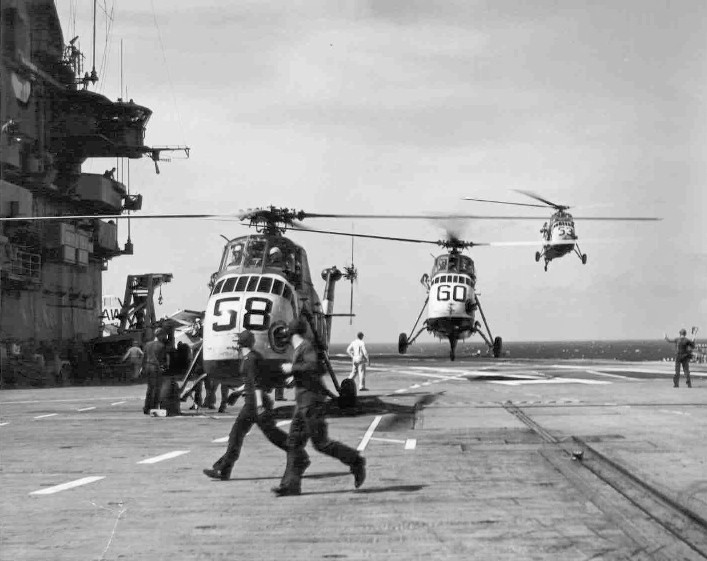
SH-34J Seabats from HS-9 on the USS Essex, 1962.

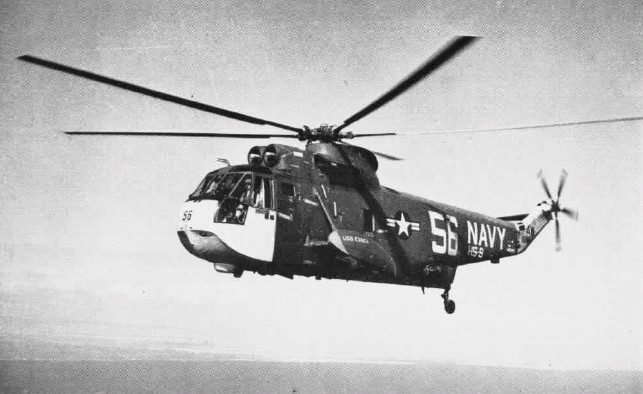
An HS-9 SH-3A from USS Essex in 1965.

- First Squadron designated HS-9

On 1 June 1956, the Navy's first all weather helicopter squadron was established at NAS Quonset Point, Rhode Island as Helicopter Antisubmarine Squadron NINE (HS-9) "Sea Griffins". The squadron began with five HSS-1N “Seabat” helicopters flown and supported by 20 officers and 100 enlisted men (tail code "HE"). HS-9 was first assigned to the aircraft carrier USS Leyte (CVS-32) and made two deployments to the Mediterranean Sea and the Caribbean in 1957 and 1958. After retirement of the Leyte, HS-9 was assigned to the USS Valley Forge (CVS-45) and operated in the Atlantic Ocean in 1959.

On 2 May 1960, HS-9 joined with anti-submarine squadrons VS-34 Proud Tigers and VS-39 Hoot Owls in ceremonies establishing Carrier Antisubmarine Air Group 60 (CVSG-60) (tail code "AW"), thus forming the genesis of the Hunter/Killer Groups of the 1960s and early 1970s. From 1960 to 1966 CVSG-60 operated from the deck of USS Essex (CVS-9) in the Atlantic and the Mediterranean Sea. In September 1962 in compliance with the 1962 United States Tri-Service aircraft designation system the squadron's HSS-1N helicopters were redesignated the SH-34J “Seabat”. In October 1962 the Sea Griffins flew numerous antisubmarine and surface ship surveillance missions in support of the quarantine of Cuba. At its peak in 1964, HS-9 had a complement of 50 officers and 260 enlisted men. In 1963 HS-9 transitioned to the Sikorsky SH-3A Sea King.

By the time the squadron celebrated its tenth birthday in 1966, it had acquired over 55,000 flight hours and more than 15,000 ship-board landings. In 1966 CVSG-60 made a single deployment aboard the Randolph. From May to September 1967 a four aircraft detachment (HS-9 Detachment 66) embarked in USS America (CV 66) in support of initial feasibility studies of the "CV Concept." While aboard, the Sea Griffins aided in the evacuation of casualties from USS Liberty (AGTR-5), which was attacked in the Mediterranean during the October 1967 Arab-Israeli conflict. From February to June 1968 CVSG-60 made a last deployment to the Mediterranean Sea, again in Essex. After this tour Essex was retired, and VS-34, VS-39 and HS-9 were disestablished on 1 October 1968.

- Second squadron designated HS-9

Just short of eight years later, on 4 June 1976, a new squadron was established and designated HS-9. This new squadron was established at Naval Air Station Jacksonville, Florida, under the command of Commander Robert L. Dalton, U.S. Navy, with a force of eight Sikorsky SH-3H "Sea King" helicopters. It adopted the name Sea Griffins in honor of the former HS-9. After intensive training ashore and aboard USS Saratoga (CV-60), the squadron joined Carrier Air Wing EIGHT CVW-8 and in August 1977 deployed to the Mediterranean aboard USS Nimitz (CVN-68). During workups for the next cruise, the filming of the movie Final Countdown aboard USS Nimitz gained HS-9 its debut on the silver screen.

The modern-day Sea Griffins' second Mediterranean deployment was interrupted in January 1980 when the Nimitz/CVW-8 team was dispatched to the Indian Ocean in response to the Iranian crisis. While on "Gonzo Station" HS-9 continued to fly its diverse missions in support of the battle group as Nimitz set a new record for consecutive days at sea. The 1981-82 Mediterranean cruise saw the Sea Griffins expand their already long tradition of ASW readiness. The squadron pioneered the "Flex-Deck" concept, introduced its close-in ASW defense techniques to the nuclear cruisers USS Texas (CGN-39) and USS Mississippi (CGN-40), shattered the submarine contact time record for current frontline HS Squadrons and became the first HS squadron ever to win the coveted Sixth Fleet "Hook-em" award for ASW excellence. This tradition of ASW readiness continued during the 1982-83 Mediterranean cruise. HS-9 was awarded its second "Hook-em" award and the Captain Arnold Jay Isbell Trophy for overall excellence and superior performance in anti-submarine warfare. HS-9 participated in numerous training evolutions during USS Nimitz's extensive overhaul and workups for the 1985 Mediterranean cruise. During that time, the Sea Griffins were awarded four consecutive Helicopter Antisubmarine Wing One maintenance trophies and the Carrier Air Wing EIGHT "Top Wrench" award for superb professionalism and maintenance excellence.

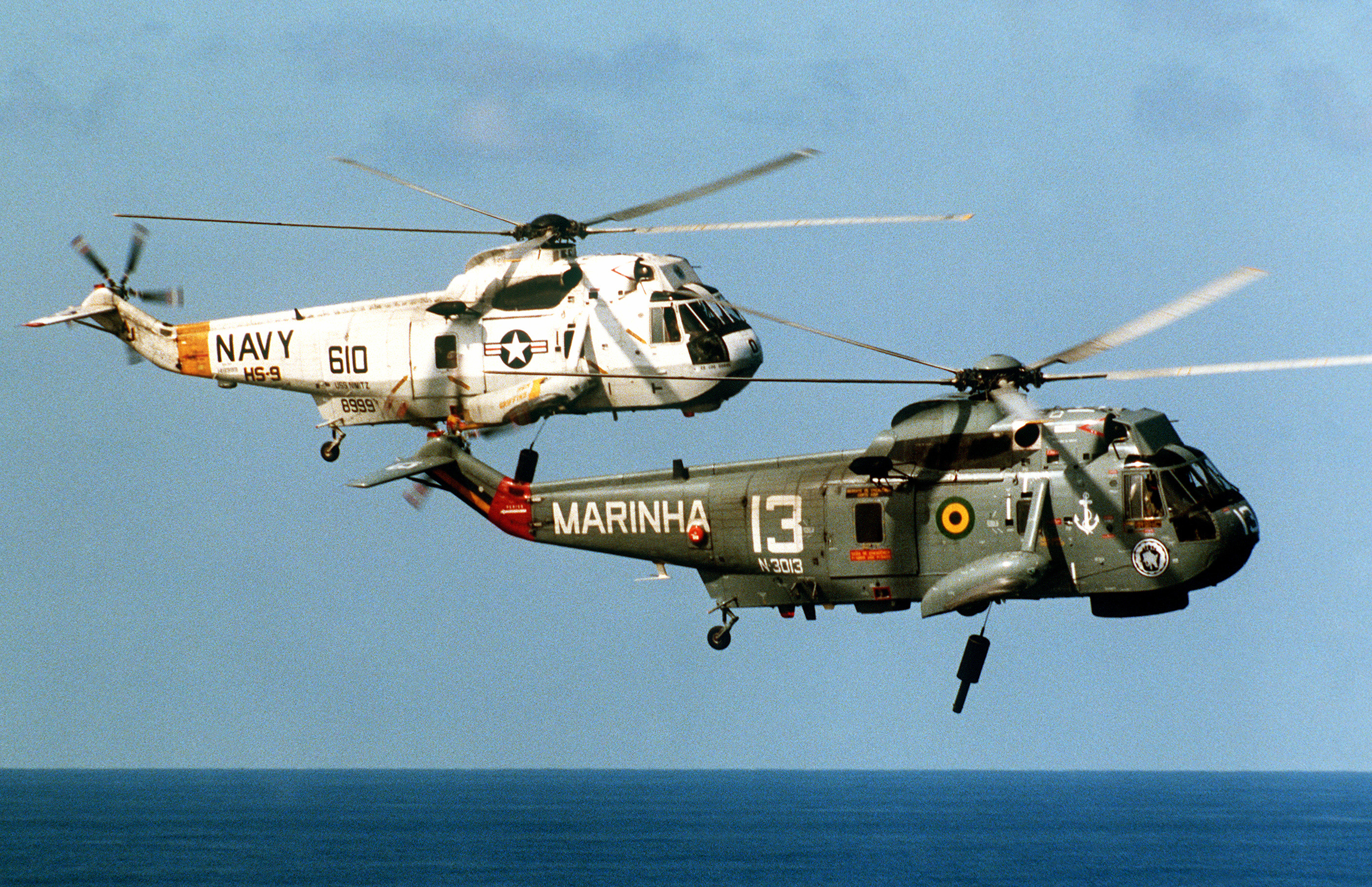
An SH-3H of HS-9 operating with a Brazilian Sea King in 1987.

During their 1985 Mediterranean deployment, HS-9 shattered its previous submarine contact and tracking record during operations against Soviet and other non-allied submarines, resulting in the Sea Griffins winning their third "Hook-em" award. 1986 saw HS-9 again preparing for deployment, embarking aboard Nimitz for training and workup phases, the first under the new "Super Cag" concept. Continuing their success, the Sea Griffins were again awarded the Arnold Jay Isbell Trophy for ASW excellence for the year 1985 and the Helicopter Antisubmarine Wing ONE maintenance awards for July through December 1985 and January through June 1986. During the advanced phase of workups the Nimitz, with HS-9 aboard, participated in the NATO exercise "Northern Wedding" from August through October 1986. HS-9 was awarded the Commander, Carrier Air Wing EIGHT, "Top Wrench" award for superior maintenance for the workup phases. During the 1986-87 Mediterranean cruise, HS-9 participated in several major exercises, the highlight of which was "Dragon Hammer," a NATO exercise that included over 60 ships and 200 aircraft.

The 1986-87 Mediterranean cruise marked HS-9s fourth and final deployment aboard USS Nimitz. The Sea Griffins escorted the Nimitz around Cape Horn and made a brief appearance in the Pacific Ocean before departing the ship in San Diego and returning to Jacksonville.

A fresh era began in 1988 as HS-9 and USS Theodore Roosevelt (CVN-71) formed the "new" team. A series of arduous workup deployments culminated in the most successful Mediterranean cruise ever for an HS squadron. All previous records for submarine contact time and ASW proficiency fell during this maiden voyage. The 1990-91 Mediterranean Cruise began by steaming to the Persian Gulf aboard the Roosevelt to participate in Operation "Desert Storm". Transiting through the Mediterranean and the Suez Canal, the Griffs set aside their traditional role of ASW to hone their skills in "Strike Rescue". They expanded the capabilities of the SH-3H on the transit to the Persian Gulf by installing the DALS (Downed Aviator Locator System) and Global Positioning System into the SH-3H aircraft. To increase the capabilities of the aircrew, HS-9 operated ten sets of Night Vision Goggles. By the time the Theodore Roosevelt arrived on station in the Persian Gulf, Operation Desert Storm had already begun.

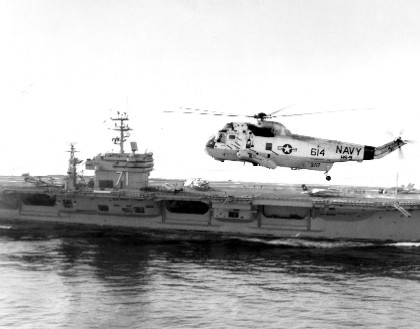
An SH-3H of HS-9 flying beside USS Theodore Roosevelt

To expand their range, HS-9 sent two aircrews forward deployed in the northern Persian Gulf to be stationed on board the USS Leftwich (DD-984) and USS Oldendorf (DD-972). The "Griffs" distinguished themselves during the war with the discovery and destruction of 13 anti-ship mines. Working with Special Forces units, the Sea Griffins captured 35 Iraqi enemy prisoners of war (EPW's). During the 1990-91 Mediterranean Cruise the Sea Griffins were awarded two consecutive "THEODORE ROOSEVELT" awards and the coveted "GOLDEN WRENCH" award. The Griffs amassed a total of 917 sorties and 2841 hours; the most impressive month by far being February, with a total of 235 sorties and 747 combat flight hours. The HS-9 Sea Griffins and Theodore Roosevelt rounded up the cruise by participating in Operation Provide Comfort assisting the Kurdish refugees.

In October 1991, HS-9 left CVW-8 and joined CVW-17 aboard USS Saratoga (CV-60). Despite a severely compressed turnaround cycle, the Sea Griffins managed to complete a rigorous training schedule, including Operation "Fabric Falcon Brave," in preparation for MED 2-92 deployment. HS-9 was awarded the Battle "E" and Safety "S" awards for 1991 in recognition of their hard work and dedication. In May 1992, HS-9 left on deployment to the Mediterranean Sea. Several important milestones were reached during the cruise, including surpassing 50,000 hours of mishap-free flying over an 11-year period. The squadron flew an unprecedented 3,353 hours during 987 sorties over the six-month deployment while receiving two "Golden Wrench" Awards and the Saratoga "Professional Excellence" Award. The Sea Griffins also completed over 1,000 small deck landings in the course of delivering over 65,000 pounds of cargo and transferring over 1,000 passengers to various ships of the battle group. The Sea Griffins continued to expand the role of the HS community by remaining on the cutting edge in such mission areas as Combat Search and rescue (CSAR), Maritime Interdiction, Surface Surveillance Coordination (SSC), and Night Vision Goggle (NVG) training. The use of innovative tactics and increased integration with Marine and Special Warfare elements provided the battle group commander with unparalleled flexibility to deal with any contingencies. The Sea Griffins participated in numerous training exercises with NATO allies during this deployment, the highlight of which was "Display Determination."

After having flown around the clock for the previous 60 hours in support of this operation, HS-9 flexed to provide five aircraft for the rescue effort to assist the stricken Turkish destroyer, TCG Muavenet (DM 357). The squadron transported a trauma team, firefighting personnel, and an Explosive Ordnance Disposal (EOD) team as well as over 4,000 pounds of equipment during hazardous night hoisting evolutions.

HS-9 returned in November 1992 from its final deployment prior to disestablishment in April 1993. Since the inception of the first squadron designated HS-9 in 1956, the Sea Griffins of both squadrons have flown from the decks of numerous destroyers, cruisers, and naval auxiliary ships, as well as 11 aircraft carriers, including HMS Ark Royal and HMCS Bonaventure. HS-9 has shown the flag in more than 20 countries, providing ASW protection from the Caribbean Sea to the Indian Ocean and probing the depths of the sea from north of the Arctic Circle to south of Cape Horn.

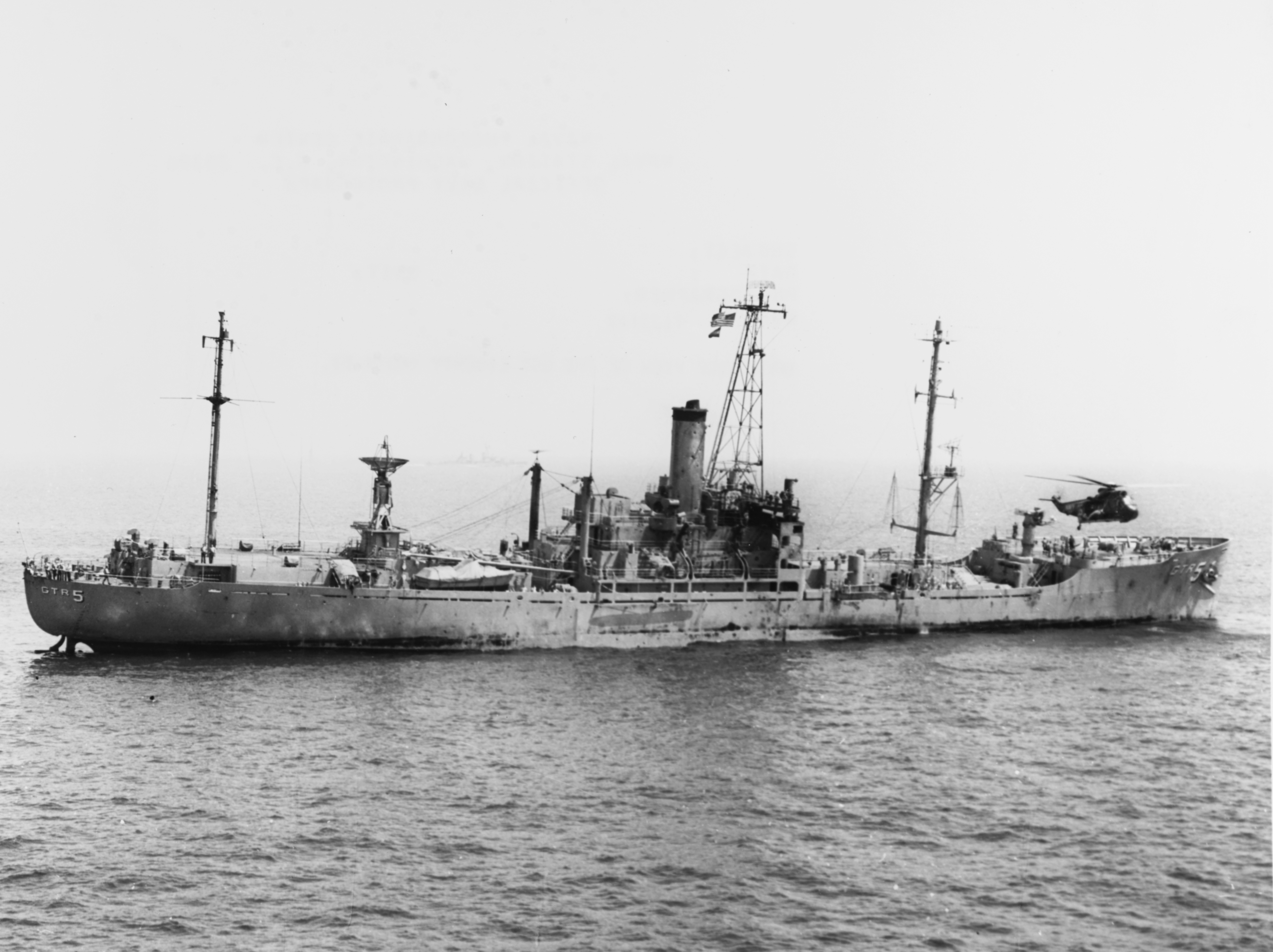
SH-3A Sea King of HS-9 hovering over the damaged USS Liberty following an attack by Israeli forces, 8 June 1967

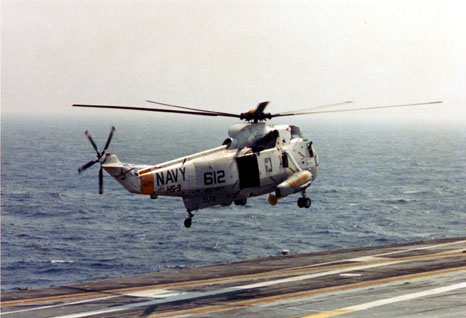
Carrier deck landing of an SH-3H from HS-9

HS-9 Reunion. More than 100 officers and enlisted men from the second HS-9 Sea Griffin Squadron during the 1976–1979 era met for the first time on 30 September – 1 October 2011, in Orange Park, Florida. The original commanding officer, Bob Dalton, was the featured speaker at the formal sit-down dinner on 1 October. Also speaking was Admiral Steve Tomaszeski, who was a lieutenant with the squadron during 1976–1979, and Anna Dennis, the widow of the squadron's third commanding officer, Jake Dennis, who was featured in The Final Countdown (as the helicopter pilot).

== In film ==
HS-9 appeared in the movie The Final Countdown. The Final Countdown is a 1980 science fiction film about a modern aircraft carrier that travels through time to just before the 1941 attack on Pearl Harbor.

== See also ==
List of United States Navy aircraft squadrons

The Final Countdown (film)

== Sources ==
- HS-9 Squadron History
- IMDB page for "The Final Countdown"
