= Ninth Avenue =

Ninth Avenue or 9 Av may refer to:

== Roads ==
- Ninth Avenue (Manhattan), New York City
- Ninth Avenue (Islamabad), Islamabad, Pakistan

== Subway/Transit stations ==
- Ninth Avenue (BMT West End Line), a subway station in Brooklyn
- Irving and 8th Avenue / 9th Avenue and Irving stations

== Transit lines ==
- IRT Ninth Avenue Line

== Other uses ==
- 9 Av, the ninth day of Av, the fifth month of the Hebrew calendar
  - Tisha B'Av a day of fasting in Judaism observed on 9 Av
