= 9th Tank Division (People's Republic of China) =

9th Tank Division (1967–76)
- Country: China
- Type: Armored
- Garrison/HQ: Weifang, Shandong

The 9th Tank Division (Chinese: 坦克第9师) was formed on August 1, 1967 from 236th Tank Self-Propelled Artillery Regiment from 31st Army Division, 239th Tank Self-Propelled Artillery Regiment from 34th Army Division and 283rd Tank Self-Propelled Artillery Regiment from 179th Army Division.

On August 28, 1969, the division was composed of:

- 33rd Tank Regiment (former 236th Tank Self-Propelled Artillery Regiment);
- 34th Tank Regiment (former 239th Tank Self-Propelled Artillery Regiment);
- 35th Tank Regiment (former 283rd Tank Self-Propelled Artillery Regiment).

The division moved to Changzhi, Shanxi province in November 1969 after its formation to reinforce 27th Army Corps.

In the 1970s the division maintained as a reduced tank division, which consisted of 3 under-equipped tank regiments.

In January 1976 the division was disbanded. Its 33rd Tank Regiment became Tank Regiment of 66th Army Corps, 34th Tank Regiment became Tank Regiment of 21st Army Corps and 35th Tank Regiment became Tank Regiment of 28th Army Corps.
