= 9th Iowa Cavalry Regiment =

- Iowa state flag
- Active: November 30, 1863, to March 23, 1866
- Country: United States
- Allegiance: Union
- Branch: Cavalry

The 9th Iowa Cavalry Regiment was a cavalry regiment that served in the Union Army during the American Civil War.

== Service ==
The 9th Iowa Cavalry was mustered into Federal service at Davenport, Iowa, for a three-year enlistment on November 30, 1863.

The regiment was mustered out of Federal service on March 23, 1866.

== Total strength and casualties ==
A total of 1353 men served in the 9th Iowa at one time or another during its existence. It suffered 19 enlisted men who were killed in action or who died of their wounds and 165 enlisted men who died of disease, for a total of 184 fatalities.

== Commanders ==
- Colonel Mathew Mark Trumbull.

== See also ==
- List of Iowa Civil War Units
- Iowa in the American Civil War
