= 9th Reserve Division (People's Republic of China) =

9th Reserve Division (1956–57)
- Active: 1956-1957.3
- Country: People's Republic of China
- Branch: People's Liberation Army
- Type: Division
- Role: Reserve Infantry
- Part of: Lanzhou Military Region
- Garrison/HQ: Zhangye, Gansu

9th Reserve Division (Chinese: 预备第9师) was formed in early 1956 in Lanzhou Military Region.

As of its activation the division was composed of:

- 25th Reserve Regiment;
- 26th Reserve Regiment;
- 27th Reserve Regiment;
- Artillery Regiment;
- Anti-Aircraft Artillery Regiment;
- Sergeant Training Regiment.

The division HQ stationed in Zhangye, Gansu, while its subordinated units spread along the Lanzhou–Xinjiang Railway.

The division was fully manned and equipped. During its short-lived existence the division was focused on the training of officers and sergeants.

In March 1957 the division was disbanded.
