= 9th Airborne Division (Sudan) =

- الفرقة التاسعة المحمولة جوا
- Flag of the Division
- Country: Sudan
- Branch: Sudanese Army
- Type: Airborne forces
- Garrison/HQ: Khartoum
- Engagements: Sudanese civil war (2023–present): Battle of Khartoum

The 9th Airborne Division is an Airborne division of the Sudanese Armed Forces

== History ==
In 2010, the 9th Airborne Division was reported to be headquartered in Khartoum. In 2022, it carried out operations north of Khartoum. During the Civil War that broke out in 2023, the Division participated in the Battle of Khartoum.
