= Ninth Street =

Ninth Street may refer to:

== Streets ==
- 9th Street (Manhattan)
- Auraria 9th Street Historic District, a historic district in Denver, Colorado
- Ninth Street Historic District, an Ohio Registered Historic Place

== Transit stations ==
- 9th Street station (SEPTA), a SEPTA station in Lansdale, Pennsylvania
- 9–10th & Locust station, a PATCO station in Philadelphia, Pennsylvania
- 9th Street station (Charlotte), a LYNX station in Charlotte, North Carolina
- Ninth Street station (PATH), a rapid transit railroad station in New York
- 9th Street–Congress Street station, a light rail station in Hoboken, New Jersey
- 9th Street station (GRTC), a GRTC Pulse bus rapid transit station in Richmond, Virginia
- Fourth Avenue/Ninth Street station, a New York City Subway station complex
- Ninth Street station (BMT Fifth Avenue Line), a defunct New York City Subway station
- Ninth Street station (IRT Third Avenue Line), a defunct New York City Subway station

== Other uses ==
- Ninth Street (film), a 1999 black-and-white drama by Kevin Willmott
- 9th Street Art Exhibition, an art exhibition
