= 9th Air Division (Japan) =

Land-based aviation force of the Imperial Japanese Army

- Active: December 10, 1943 – ?
- Country: Empire of Japan
- Allegiance: Empire of Japan
- Branch: (Empire of Japan) Imperial Japanese Army
- Type: Army aviation unit
- Role: Fighter, bomber, reconnaissance
- Part of: 3rd Air Army
- Engagements: World War II

The 9th Hikō Shidan (第9飛行師団) was a land-based aviation force of the Imperial Japanese Army. The division was formed on 10 December 1943 in the Netherlands East Indies as part of the Third Air Army.

== Purpose ==
In January 1944 the 9th Air Division was to strengthen Sumatra's air defenses. By this time the Palembang Air Defense Headquarters had been re-designated the Palembang Defense Unit, and was assigned to the 9th Air Division upon that command's formation. This unit was expanded to include both fighter aircraft and antiaircraft gun units. The 21st and 22nd Fighter Regiments of the Imperial Japanese Army Air Force were responsible for intercepting Allied aircraft. The 101st, 102nd and 103rd Antiaircraft Regiments and 101st Machine Cannon Battalion remained, and had been supplemented by the 101st Antiaircraft Balloon Regiment which operated barrage balloons.

== Commanders ==
- Lt. General Ryuichi Shimada (11 December 1943 – 2 October 1944)
- Lt. General Hidenobu Hashimoto (2 October 1944 – 16 July 1945)
- Lt. General Choji Shirokane (16 July 1945 – 30 September 1945)

== See also ==
- List of air divisions of the Imperial Japanese Army
