= 9 Squadron =

9 Squadron or 9th Squadron may refer to:

== Aviation units ==
- No. 9 Squadron RAAF, Australia
- 9 Squadron (Belgium)
- No. 9 Squadron IAF, India
- 9th Squadron (Iraq)
- No. 9 Squadron RNZAF, New Zealand
- No. 9 Squadron PAF, Pakistan
- No. 9 Squadron SLAF, Sri Lanka
- No. 9 Squadron RSAF, Saudi Arabia
- No. 9 Squadron RAF, United Kingdom
- 9th Aero Squadron, Air Service, United States Army
- 9th Attack Squadron, United States Air Force
- 9th Airlift Squadron, United States Air Force
- 9th Bomb Squadron, United States Air Force
- 9th Combat Operations Squadron, United States Air Force
- 9th Fighter Squadron, United States Air Force
- 9th Operational Weather Squadron, United States Air Force
- 9th Space Operations Squadron, United States Air Force
- 9th Special Operations Squadron, United States Air Force
- Helicopter Anti-Submarine Squadron 9 or HS-9, United States Navy

== Other units ==
- 9 Parachute Squadron RE, Royal Engineers, British Army
