= 9th Brigade =

9th Brigade may refer to:

== Australia ==
- 9th Brigade (Australia)

== Canada ==
- 9th Canadian Infantry Brigade

== China ==
- 9th Fighter Brigade

== Croatia ==
- 9th Guards Brigade (Croatia)

== France ==
- 9th Marine Infantry Brigade

== Germany ==
- 9th Panzerlehr Brigade (Bundeswehr)

== Greece ==
- 9th Infantry Brigade (Greece)

== Hungary ==
- 9th Infantry Brigade (Hungary)

== India ==
- 9th Indian Infantry Brigade, a unit during the World War II
- 9th (Sirhind) Brigade, a unit during World War I
- 9th (Secunderabad) Cavalry Brigade, a unit the World War I

== Israel ==
- Oded Brigade

== Lebanon ==
- 9th Infantry Brigade (Lebanon)

== Republika Srpska ==
- 9th Grahovo Brigade

== Romania ==
- 9th Mechanized Brigade (Romania)

== Russia ==
- 9th Guards Artillery Brigade
- 9th Separate Guards Motor Rifle Brigade

== Soviet Union ==
- 9th Guards Artillery Brigade

== New Zealand ==
- 9th Brigade (New Zealand)

== Turkey ==
- 9th Commando Brigade (Turkey)

== Ukraine ==
- 9th Unmanned Systems Brigade (Ukraine)

== United Kingdom ==
- 9th Armoured Brigade (United Kingdom)
- 9th Cavalry Brigade (United Kingdom)
- 9th Cyclist Brigade
- 9th Infantry Brigade (United Kingdom)
- 9th Mounted Brigade (United Kingdom)
- 9th Provisional Brigade
- 9th Reserve Brigade

=== Artillery units ===
- 9th Brigade Royal Field Artillery
- 9th Brigade, North Irish Division, Royal Artillery
- 9th (West Riding and Staffordshire) Medium Brigade, Royal Garrison Artillery
- IX Brigade, Royal Horse Artillery

== United States ==
- 9th Marine Expeditionary Brigade (United States)

== See also ==
- 9th Division (disambiguation)
- 9th Regiment (disambiguation)
