= 9th Regiment =

9th Regiment may refer to:

Great Britain

- 9th Regiment of Foot

United States

- 9th Marine Regiment (United States)
- 9th Infantry Regiment (United States)

France

- 9th Parachute Chasseur Regiment

Italy

- 9th Parachute Assault Regiment

Ukraine

- 9th Greek Regiment
