= 825th Strategic Aerospace Division =

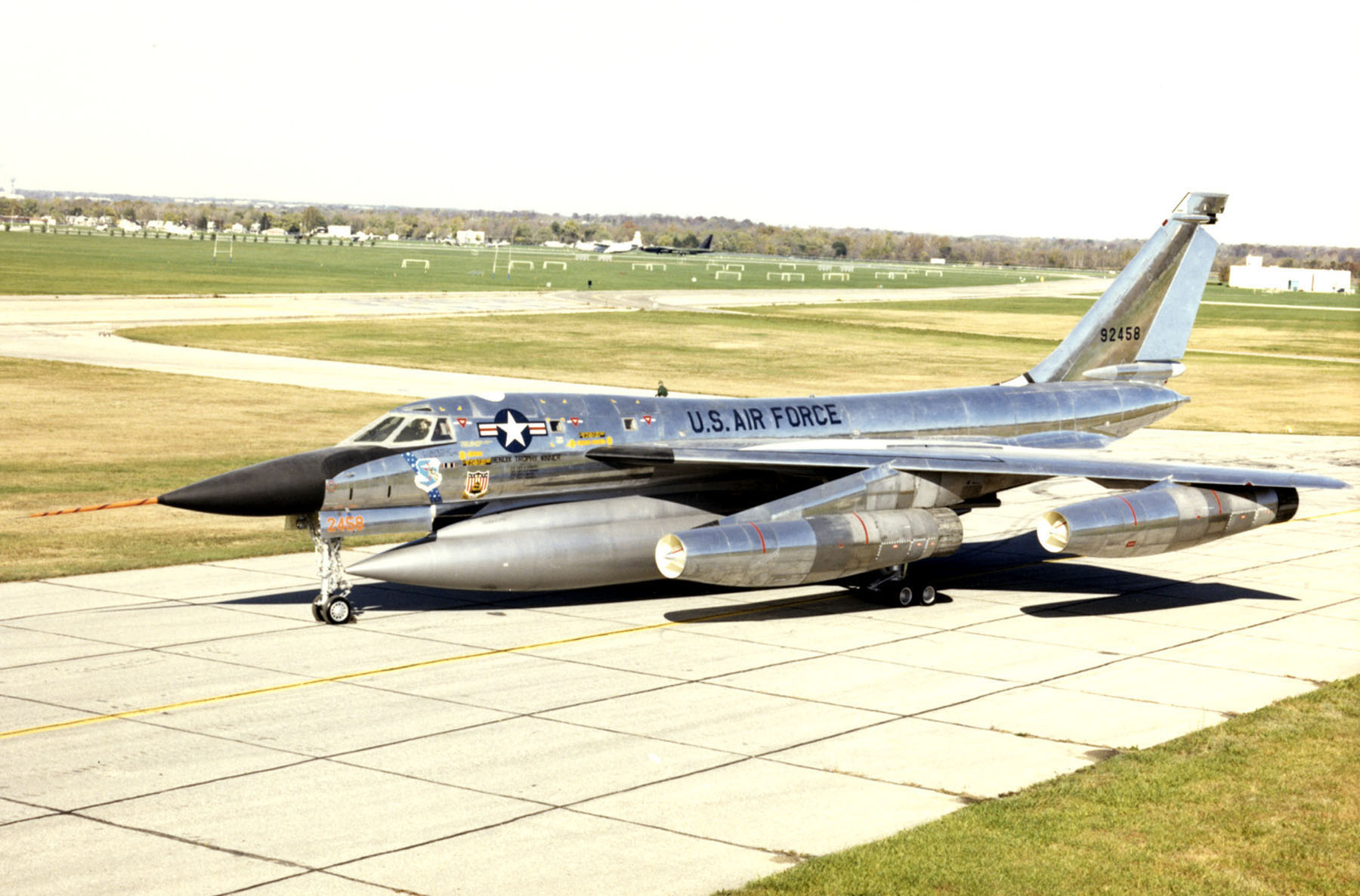
- A division B-58 Hustler (Note: Aircraft is B-58A-10-CF, serial 59-2458, Cowtown Hustler. Its crew earmed the Bendix and Mackay Trophies when they set a transcontinental speed record on 5 March 1962 by flying nonstop from Los Angeles to New York and back again. The return flight was the first that moved across the country faster than the rotational speed of the earth, making the local time of its arrival at Los Angeles earlier than the local time of its departure from New York. It is now on display at the National Museum of the United States Air Force. Baugher, Joe (11 June 2023). "1959 USAF Serial Numbers". Joe Baugher. Archived from the original on 7 October 2011..)
- Active: 1955–1970
- Country: United States
- Branch: United States Air Force
- Role: Command of strategic strike forces
- Decorations: Air Force Outstanding Unit Award

Commanders
- Notable commanders: Gen James E. Hill; Lt Gen Gerald W. Johnson

Insignia
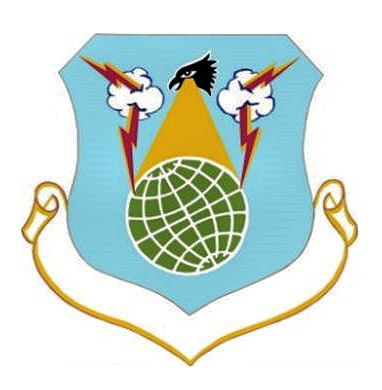
- 825th Strategic Aerospace Division emblem (Note: Approved 17 May 1956. Description: A shield azure, in base a sphere vert, latitude, longitude and fimbriation lines argent; in chief a falcon's head erased sable, fimbriation and eyeball of the third [color mentioned]; a beam of light or, from the falcon's eye to the globe; all between two bolts of lightning of the last [color mentioned], shaded gules, transfixing two clouds of the third [color mentioned].)

The 825th Strategic Aerospace Division is an inactive United States Air Force organization. Its last assignment was with Strategic Air Command (SAC), assigned to Second Air Force at Little Rock Air Force Base, Arkansas, where it was inactivated on 1 January 1970.

The division was first activated at Little Rock by SAC as the 825th Air Division in August 1955 as the host and command organization for two Boeing B-47 Stratojet units, the 70th Strategic Reconnaissance Wing and the 384th Bombardment Wing. From 1956 to 1959 the division's wings deployed to overseas bases periodically. After an organizational test, the 384th Wing began to maintain its alert aircraft at its home station and the 70th Wing became a training unit for reconnaissance crews flying the Stratojet. The division was awarded an Air Force Outstanding Unit Award for its participation in the test. A third B-47 wing at Chennault Air Force Base was briefly assigned to the division as well.

On two occasions, the division's operational units assumed a full alert posture. The first was in 1958, when the Lebanon and the Taiwan Strait crises occurred, and the second responded to the Cuban Missile Crisis.

As the B-47 force grew smaller in the early 1960s, the division's wings were inactivated, but the division added one of the Air Force's two LGM-25 Titan II wings and became the headquarters for SAC's two Convair B-58 Hustler wings. It continued this mission until January 1970 as the B-58 was retired and Little Rock was transferred to Tactical Air Command.

== History ==
=== B-47 era ===
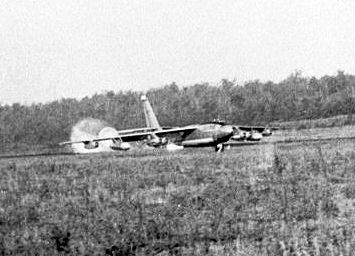
384th Bombardment wing B-47 landing at Little Rock

The division was first activated by Strategic Air Command (SAC) as the 825th Air Division on 1 August 1955 to act as host and command organization for two Boeing B-47 Stratojet units, the 70th Strategic Reconnaissance Wing and the 384th Bombardment Wing at Little Rock Air Force Base, Arkansas. Little Rock had been opened by SAC's 4225th Air Base Squadron on 1 February of that year and construction was still in progress when the division and 384th Wing were activated on 1 August. The division's 825th Air Base Group was the only complete unit at Little Rock, for it was not until 9 September that the base could handle even limited aircraft movements. The 70th Wing had been deployed at Lockbourne Air Force Base, Ohio, where other SAC RB-47 reconnaissance wings were located, (Note: Lockbourne was also home to SAC's 91st and 26th Strategic Reconnaissance Wings. Ravenstein, pp. 47–49, 125–127.) for training on the RB-47 since activating in January, while the 384th Wing was only partially manned and had no aircraft until the end of the year. The 70th Wing remained attached to Lockbourne's 801st Air Division until mid-October 1955 when it was finally able to move its planes to Little Rock. The 825th controlled the manning, equipping, and operational readiness of its two wings.

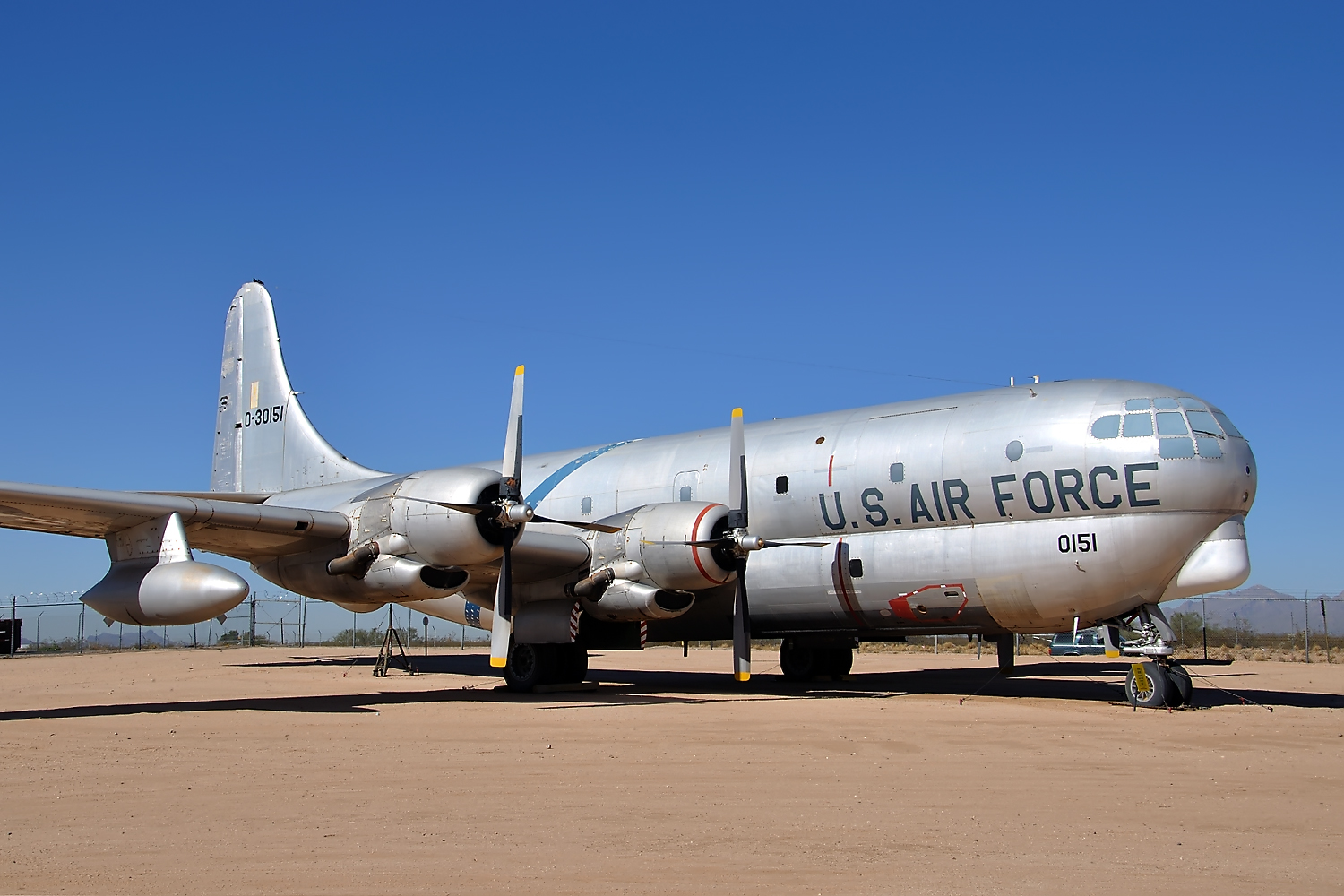
KC-97G Stratofreighter in SAC markings

The 70th Wing also was assigned a squadron of Boeing KC-97 Stratofreighters, whose first plane arrived at Little Rock in September 1955. By June 1956, the 70th Air Refueling Squadron was ready for deployment and spent two months at Ernest Harmon Air Force Base, Newfoundland. In October 1956, the 70th Wing deployed as a unit to Morocco, and a few weeks after its return in December, the 384th Wing deployed to the United Kingdom. Although the 384th Wing continued to deploy under Operation Reflex until July 1959 when it began to maintain aircraft on alert at Little Rock, these were the only times the wings deployed as entire units.

Also during 1957 the division was the lead unit for a test of a revised organization for its two combat wings. The test was then expanded to include changes to the 825th Air Base Group. Because of the test's success, the division's subordinate units retained the organization after test completion and the system was eventually implemented throughout SAC. Division participation in the test earned the division an Air Force Outstanding Unit Award. Along with this reorganization, the mission of the 70th Wing became training combat ready crews, rather than strategic reconnaissance missions.

SAC increased its readiness posture in July 1958 in response to the crises in Lebanon and the Taiwan Strait. As a result, the 384th Wing placed all its aircraft on Emergency War Order alert and ceased its normal flying training operations.

The division became responsible for a unit not located at Little Rock for the first time in June 1960, when the 68th Bombardment Wing at Chennault Air Force Base, Louisiana was assigned to the 825th, giving it three wings equipped with the Stratojet. The 70th Air Refueling Squadron began to maintain a portion of its alert tankers at Clinton County Air Force Base, Ohio in September 1960 and the 4090th Combat Support Group there was transferred to the Division. However, SAC was soon withdrawing its B-47s from its inventory. The first sign of the reduction in the Stratojet force came to the division when the 70th Wing shut down its RB-47 combat crew training school in October 1961 and traded its reconnaissance equipped RB-47s for bombers. The 70th never became combat ready with bombers, but was inactivated in January 1962. The 68th Wing followed suit three months later as SAC ceased tactical operations at Chennault and the division once again was responsible only for wings at Little Rock.

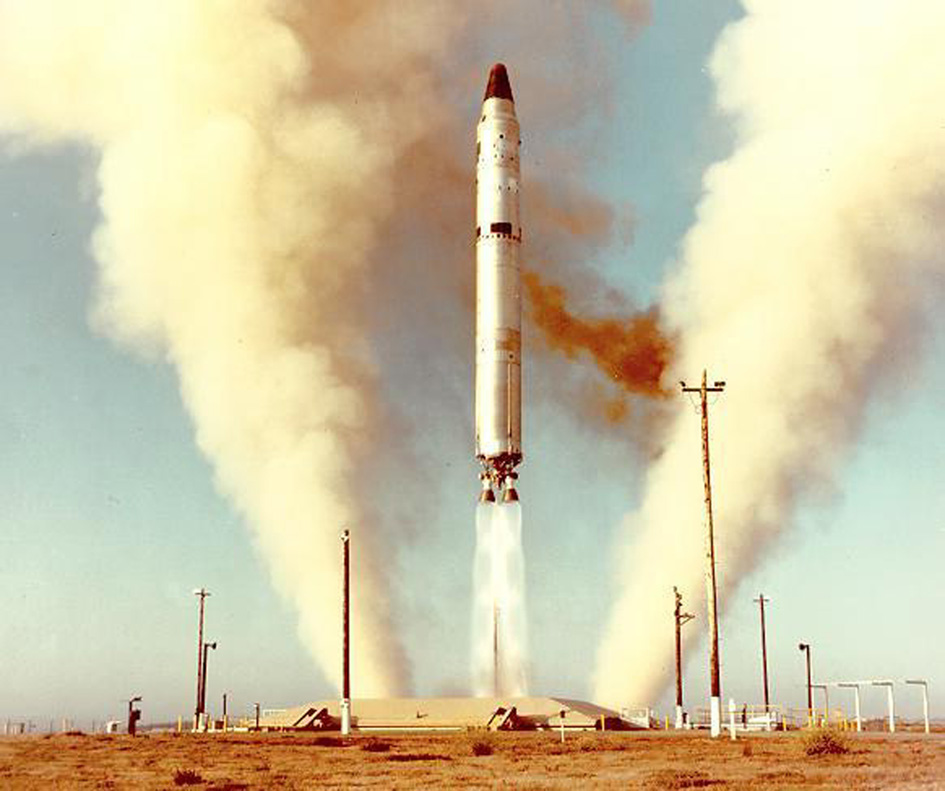
Titan II missile launch

Even as the B-47 force was shrinking, the 825th assumed a new mission in April 1962, when the 308th Strategic Missile Wing was activated at Little Rock and assigned to the division. The 308th assumed control of its first LGM-25C Titan II intercontinental ballistic missile complex in August, although it did not become fully operational until December of the following year. Because the division controlled both bomber and missile forces, it was renamed the 825th Strategic Aerospace Division.

=== Cuban Missile Crisis ===
Shortly after the detection of Soviet missiles in Cuba, on 22 October 1962, SAC dispersed its B-47s. Most dispersal bases were civilian airfields with AF Reserve or ANG units. B-47s were configured for execution of the Emergency War Order as soon as possible after dispersal. On 29 October, KC-97s were dispersed to reinforce forward based Tanker Task Forces and provide refueling for the increased number of B-47s on alert. On 15 November one-sixth of the dispersed B-47s were recalled to their home bases. Although SAC increased the alert status of some of its Titan I missiles, none of the Titan IIs of the 308th Wing were yet operational.

The dispersed B-47s and supporting tankers were recalled to their home bases on 24 November. Three days later SAC returned to normal alert posture.

=== B-58 era ===
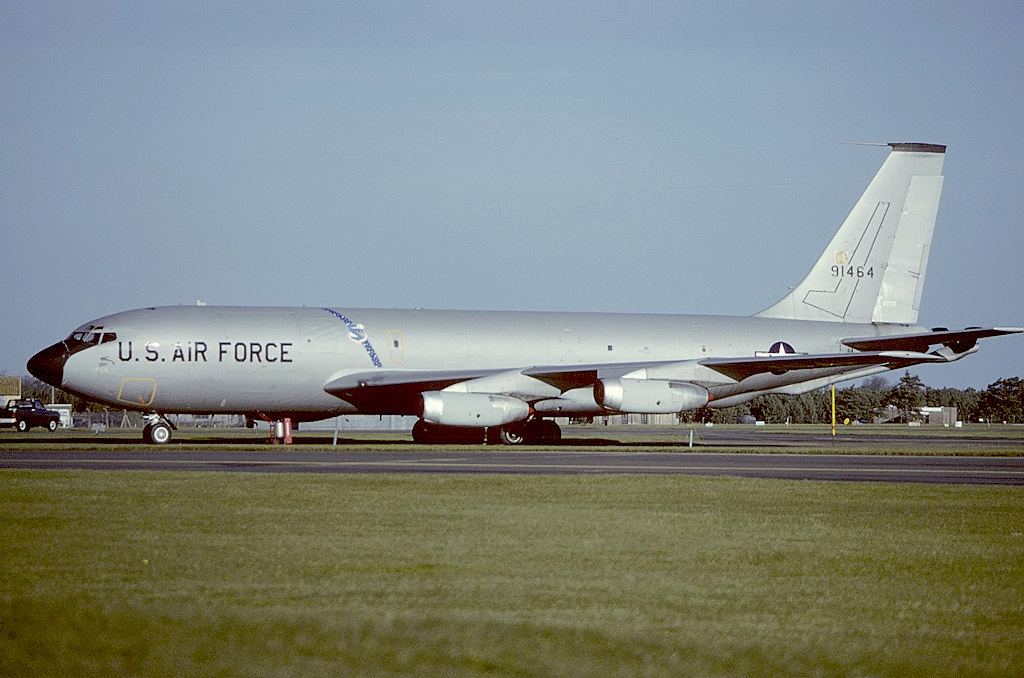
Boeing KC-135A Stratotanker

In September 1964, the division's final B-47 wing inactivated and the division became SAC's headquarters for the new supersonic Convair B-58 Hustler. The 43d Bombardment Wing was attached to the division in August and assigned in September when it moved to Little Rock from Carswell Air Force Base, Texas, where it had been performing operational testing of the B-58 and also managed the combat crew training school for the Hustler. The B-58 training school was transferred from Carswell to Bunker Hill Air Force Base, Indiana where SAC's other B-58 wing, the 305th Bombardment Wing was located. The 305th was assigned to the division the same day that the 43d Wing moved.

The division was inactivated with the conversion of the 305th to an Air Refueling Wing and its reassignment at the beginning of January 1970 as the B-58 was phased out and the division's Hustlers transferred to storage with the Military Aircraft Storage and Disposition Center at Davis-Monthan Air Force Base, Arizona. The 825th Combat Support Group was reassigned to the 308th Wing until the end of the month when the 43d Bombardment Wing was inactivated and Little Rock was transferred to Tactical Air Command.

== Lineage ==
- Established as the 825 Air Division on 3 June 1955

Activated on 1 August 1955
Redesignated 825 Strategic Aerospace Division on 1 June 1962
Inactivated on 1 January 1970

=== Assignments ===
- Second Air Force, 1 August 1955 – 1 January 1970

=== Stations ===
- Little Rock Air Force Base, Arkansas, 1 August 1955 – 1 January 1970

=== Components ===
Wings

- 43d Bombardment Wing: Attached 19 – 31 August 1964, assigned 1 September 1964 – 1 January 1970 (Note: All division components were stationed at Little Rock Air Force Base, except as noted.)
- 68th Bombardment Wing: 15 June 1960 – 15 April 1963

Chennault Air Force Base, Louisiana

- 70th Strategic Reconnaissance Wing (later 70 Bombardment Wing): 1 August 1955 – 25 June 1962 (attached to 801st Air Division until c. 19 October 1955, 5th Air Division 26 October – 17 December 1956)
- 305th Bombardment Wing: 1 September 1964 – 1 January 1970

Bunker Hill Air Force Base (later Grissom Air Force Base)

- 308th Strategic Missile Wing: 1 April 1962 – 1 January 1970
- 384th Bombardment Wing: 1 August 1955 – 1 September 1964 (attached to 7th Air Division 3 January – 5 April 1957)

Groups

- 825th Air Base Group (later 825th Combat Support Group): 1 August 1955 – 1 January 1970
- 825th Medical Group: 1 September 1958 – 1 January 1970
- 4090 Combat Support Group: 1 September 1960 – 15 September 1961

Clinton County Air Force Base, Ohio

Other

- 4225th USAF Infirmary (later 4225th USAF Dispensary): 1 November 1955 – 1 September 1958 (attached to 825th Air Base Group)

=== Aircraft and Missiles ===
- Boeing KC-97 Stratofreighter, 1955–1963
- Boeing B-47 Stratojet, 1956–1964
- Boeing RB-47 Stratojet, 1955–1962
- LGM-25C Titan II, 1963–1970
- Convair B-58 Hustler, 1964–1970
- Convair TB-58 Hustler, 1964–1970
- Boeing KC-135 Stratotanker, 1964–1970
- Boeing EC-135, 1966–1970

=== Awards ===
Award streamer	Award	Dates	Notes
	Air Force Outstanding Unit Award	15 February – 31 December 1957	AF Pamphlet 900-2, p. 567

=== Commanders ===
- Brig Gen Joseph J. Preston, 1 August 1955
- Col Davison Dalziel, 10 July 1959
- Brig Gen John S. Samuel, 1 September 1959
- Col Robert W. Strong Jr., 20 November 1961
- Col Collier H. Davidson, 21 February 1963 (temporary)
- Brig Gen Murray A. Bywater, 31 May 1963
- Brig Gen Gerald W. Johnson, 1 July 1966
- Brig Gen James E. Hill, 11 June 1968 – 1 January 1970

== See also ==
- List of United States Air Force air divisions
- List of B-47 units of the United States Air Force
