= Gerald Johnson =

Gerald Johnson may refer to:

- Gerald Johnson (musician) (born 1943), musician with the Steve Miller Band
- Gerald W. Johnson (writer) (1890–1980), American journalist and author
- Gerald W. Johnson (nuclear expert) (1917–2005), nuclear specialist
- Gerald W. Johnson (military officer) (1919–2002), United States Air Force officer
- Gerald George Drummond Johnson (born 1976), Costa Rican footballer
- Gerald Johnson (Ontario politician) (born 1950)
- Gerald Johnson (Georgia politician) in 135th Georgia General Assembly
- Gerald Clyde Johnson (born 1975), baseball player
- Gerald "Slink" Johnson (born 1973), American actor
- Gerald R. Johnson (1920–1945), World War II flying ace for the United States Army Air Forces

== See also ==
- Jerry Johnson (disambiguation)
- Gerard Johnson (disambiguation)
- Gerald Johnston (1891–1968), Australian rules footballer
- Gerald MacIntosh Johnston (1904–1944), Canadian actor
