= Jeremy Johnson =

Jeremy Johnson may refer to:

- Sir Jeremy Johnson, judge of the High Court of England and Wales
- Jeremy Johnson (baseball) (born 1982), minor league baseball pitcher
- Jeremy Johnson (American football) (born 1994), American football quarterback
- Jeremy Johnson (entrepreneur), an African technology entrepreneur
- Jeremy Robert Johnson, American writer, Bram Stoker Award for Best First Novel

== Fictional character ==
- Jeremy Johnson (Phineas and Ferb), a character from Phineas and Ferb

== See also ==
- Jerry Johnson (disambiguation)
