= 68th Air Refueling Squadron =

Inactive US Air Force unit

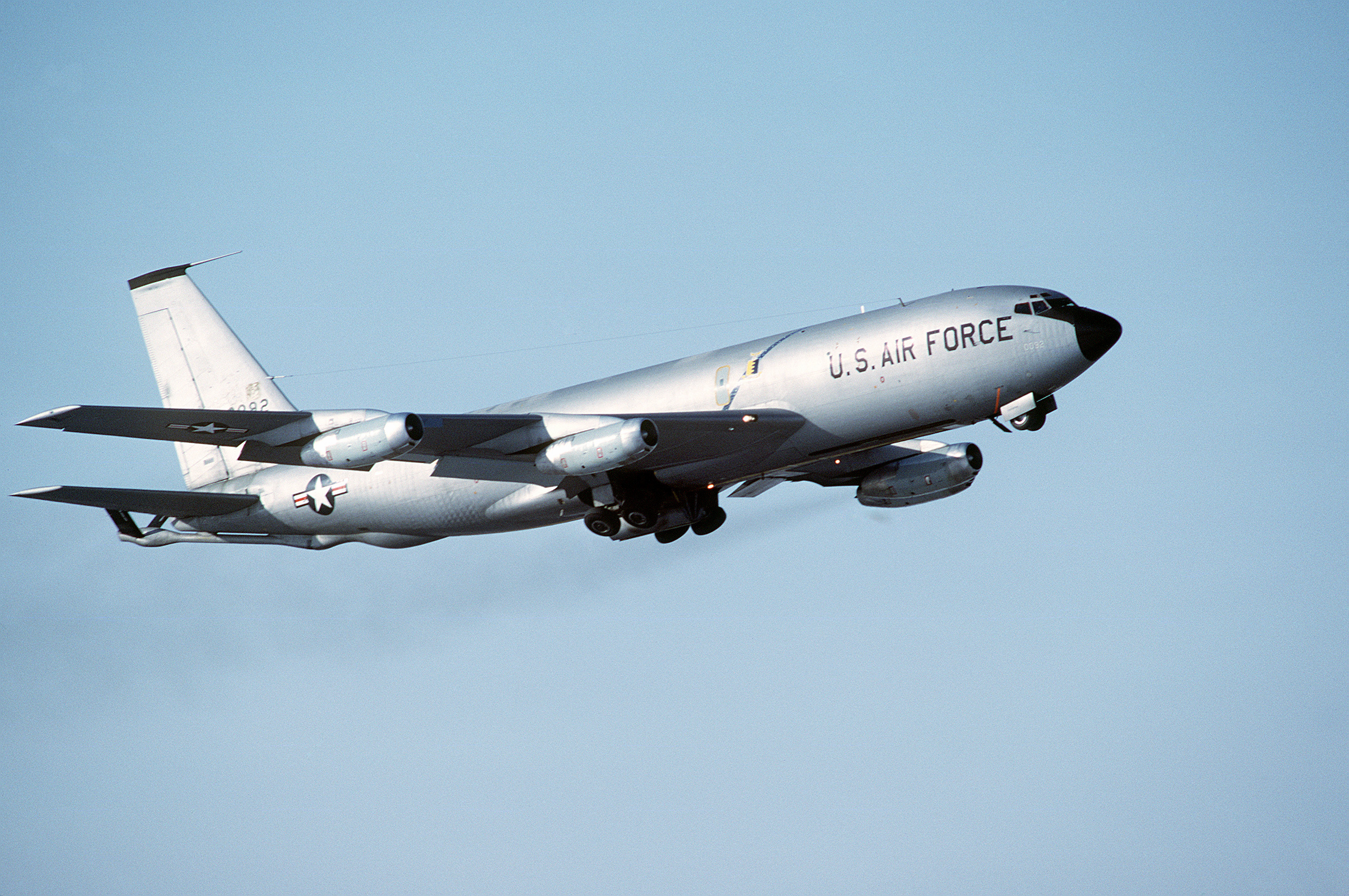
- KC-135A Stratotanker in Strategic Air Command markings
- Active: 1942–1944; 1952; 1953–1965
- Country: United States
- Branch: United States Air Force
- Role: Aerial refueling
- Motto: Around the World Around the Clock

Insignia
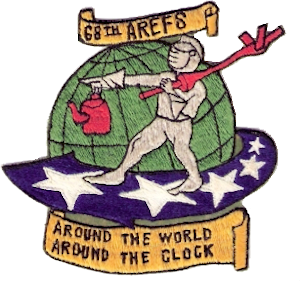
- Patch with 68th Air Refueling Squadron emblem

The 68th Air Refueling Squadron is an inactive United States Air Force unit. It was last assigned to the 305th Bombardment Wing at Bunker Hill Air Force Base, Indiana, where it was inactivated on 25 March 1965.

The earliest predecessor of the squadron was the 468th Bombardment Squadron, which served as a heavy bomber training unit until it was inactivated in a reorganization of United States Army Air Forces units in the United States designed to conserve manpower needed in the overseas theaters.

The 68th Air Refueling Squadron served with Strategic Air Command to extend the range of bombers assigned to the command as needed to perform their worldwide mission. It was discontinued in 1965 and its mission, personnel and equipment were transferred to the 305th Air Refueling Squadron. In 1985 the squadron was consolidated with the 468th Bombardment Squadron, but has not been active since then.

== History ==
=== World War II ===
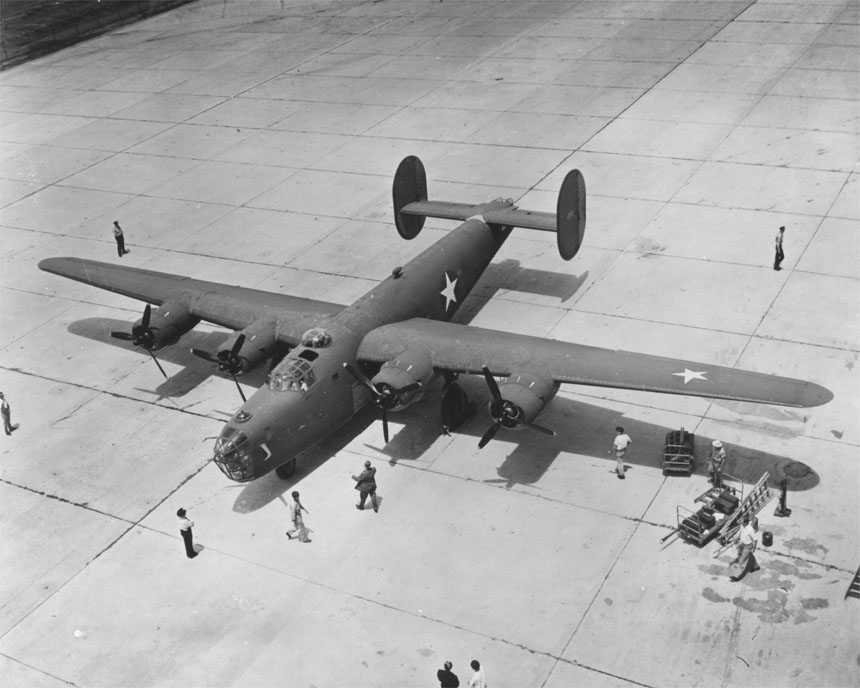
Convair B-24 Liberator

The 468th Bombardment Squadron was activated on 15 July 1942 at Salt Lake City Army Air Base, Utah as one of the four original squadrons of the 333d Bombardment Group. (Note: Maurer indicates the squadrons of the 333rd Group were activated at Salt Lake, then moved to Topeka in August. Maurer, Combat Squadrons, pp. 573-575. However, the 333rd Group was activated at Topeka, and the Air Force Historical Research Agency Factsheet for the only original squadron of the 333rd, currently the 966th Airborne Air Control Squadron, gives Topeka as its activation station. Maurer, Combat Units, pp. 213-14; "Factsheet 966 Airborne Air Control Squadron". Air Force Historical Research Agency. 31 March 2008.) In August, it began operating as an Operational Training Unit (OTU) for Consolidated B-24 Liberator units at Topeka Army Air Base. The OTU program involved the use of an oversized parent unit to provide cadres to "satellite groups" The OTU program was patterned after the unit training system of the Royal Air Force. The parent assumed responsibility for satellite unit training and oversaw their expansion with graduates of Army Air Forces Training Command schools to become effective combat units. Phase I training concentrated on individual training in crewmember specialties. Phase II training emphasized the coordination for the crew to act as a team. The final phase concentrated on operation as a unit.

In February 1943, the squadron moved to Dalhart Army Air Field, Texas. However, many of the Army Air Forces' (AAF) bomber units had been activated. With the exception of special programs, like forming Boeing B-29 Superfortress units, training “fillers” for existing units became more important than unit training. The squadron mission changed to becoming a Replacement Training Unit (RTU). RTUs were also oversized units, but their mission was to train individual pilots or aircrews. It continued this mission through November 1943.

The AAF was finding that standard military units like the 468th, whose manning was based on relatively inflexible tables of organization were proving not well adapted to the training mission, even more so to the replacement mission. Accordingly, the Army Air Forces adopted a more functional system in which each base was organized into a separate numbered unit. The 467th and its parent group were inactivated in 1944 and replaced by the 232d Army Air Forces Base Unit (Development, Heavy) as Dalhart Army Air Field prepared to transition to Boeing B-29 Superfortress training.

=== Strategic Air Command ===
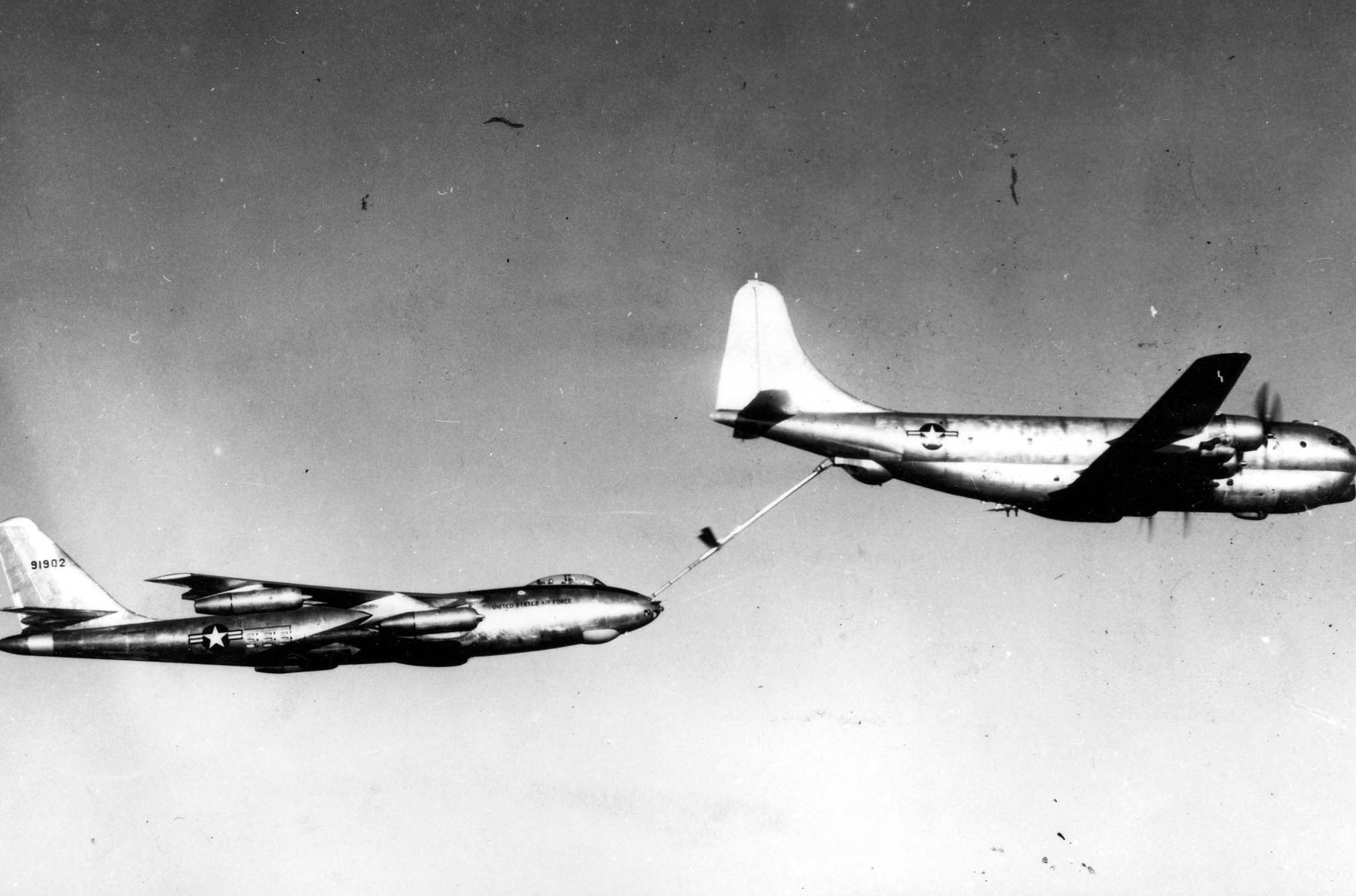
KC-97 refueling a B-47 bomber

The 68th Air Refueling Squadron was activated briefly in 1952 as a Strategic Air Command (SAC) air refueling squadron, but was apparently not manned before being inactivated seven weeks later. It was reactivated toward the end of 1953 at Lake Charles Air Force Base and equipped with Boeing KC-97 Stratofreighter aircraft to support the Boeing B-47 Stratojet medium bombers of the 68th Bombardment Wing. In September 1957, the squadron moved to Bunker Hill Air Force Base when SAC assumed responsibility for the base from Tactical Air Command. It was the first operational SAC unit at Bunker Hill.

In 1959 the squadron upgraded to the jet Boeing KC-135 Stratotanker in anticipation of the arrival of the 305th Bombardment Wing at Bunker Hill and the wing's conversion from B-47s to the Convair B-58 Hustler. The squadron was inactivated in 1965 and replaced by the 305th Air Refueling Squadron, which assumed its mission, personnel, and equipment.

On 19 September 1985 the 68th Air Refueling Squadron was consolidated with the 468th Bombardment Squadron. The consolidated unit retains the designation of 68th Air Refueling Squadron, Heavy.

=== Lineage ===
468th Bombardment Squadron

- Constituted as 468th Bombardment Squadron (Heavy) on 9 July 1942

Activated on 15 July 1942
Inactivated on 1 April 1944

- Consolidated with 68th Air Refueling Squadron on 19 September 1985 as the 68th Air Refueling Squadron (remained inactive)

68th Air Refueling Squadron

- Constituted as 68th Air Refueling Squadron, Medium on 7 April 1952

Activated on 8 April 1952 (not operational)
Inactivated on 28 May 1952

- Activated 25 November 1953

Redesignated 68th Air Refueling Squadron, Heavy on 1 June 1959
Inactivated on 25 March 1965

- Consolidated with 468th Bombardment Squadron on 19 September 1985 (remained inactive)

=== Assignments ===
- 333d Bombardment Group, 15 July 1942 – 1 April 1944
- 68th Strategic Reconnaissance Wing, 8 April 1952 – 28 May 1952 (attached to 37th Air Division to 5 May 1952, then to 91st Strategic Reconnaissance Wing)
- 68th Bombardment Wing, 25 November 1953 (detached from 14 June – 7 August 1954)
- 4041st Air Base Group, 15 September 1957
- 305th Bombardment Wing, 1 June 1959 – 25 March 1965

=== Stations ===
- Salt Lake City Army Air Base, Utah, 15 July 1942
- Topeka Army Air Base, Kansas, c. 21 August 1942
- Dalhart Army Air Field, Texas, 22 February 1943 – 1 April 1944
- Lake Charles Air Force Base, Louisiana, 8 April 1952 – 28 May 1952
- Lake Charles Air Force Base, Louisiana, 25 November 1953
- Bunker Hill Air Force Base, Indiana, 3 September 1957 – 25 March 1965

=== Aircraft ===
- Consolidated B-24 Liberator, 1942–1943
- Boeing KC-97 Stratofreighter, 1952–1959
- Boeing KC-135 Stratotanker, 1959–1965

=== Campaigns ===
Campaign Streamer	Campaign	Dates	Notes
	American Theater without inscription	15 July 1942–1 April 1944	

== See also ==
- List of United States Air Force air refueling squadrons
- B-24 Liberator units of the United States Army Air Forces
