= Gerard Johnson =

Gerard Johnson may refer to:

- Gerard Johnson (musician) (born 1963), British keyboard player best known for his work with Saint Etienne and The Syn
- Gerard Johnson (sculptor), Anglo-Dutch artist of the 17th century best known for his memorial to Shakespeare
- Gerard Johnson the elder (died 1611), Dutch sculptor
- Gerard Johnson (director), British film director

== See also ==
- Gerald Johnson (disambiguation)
- Jerry Johnson (disambiguation)
