= 801st Air Division =

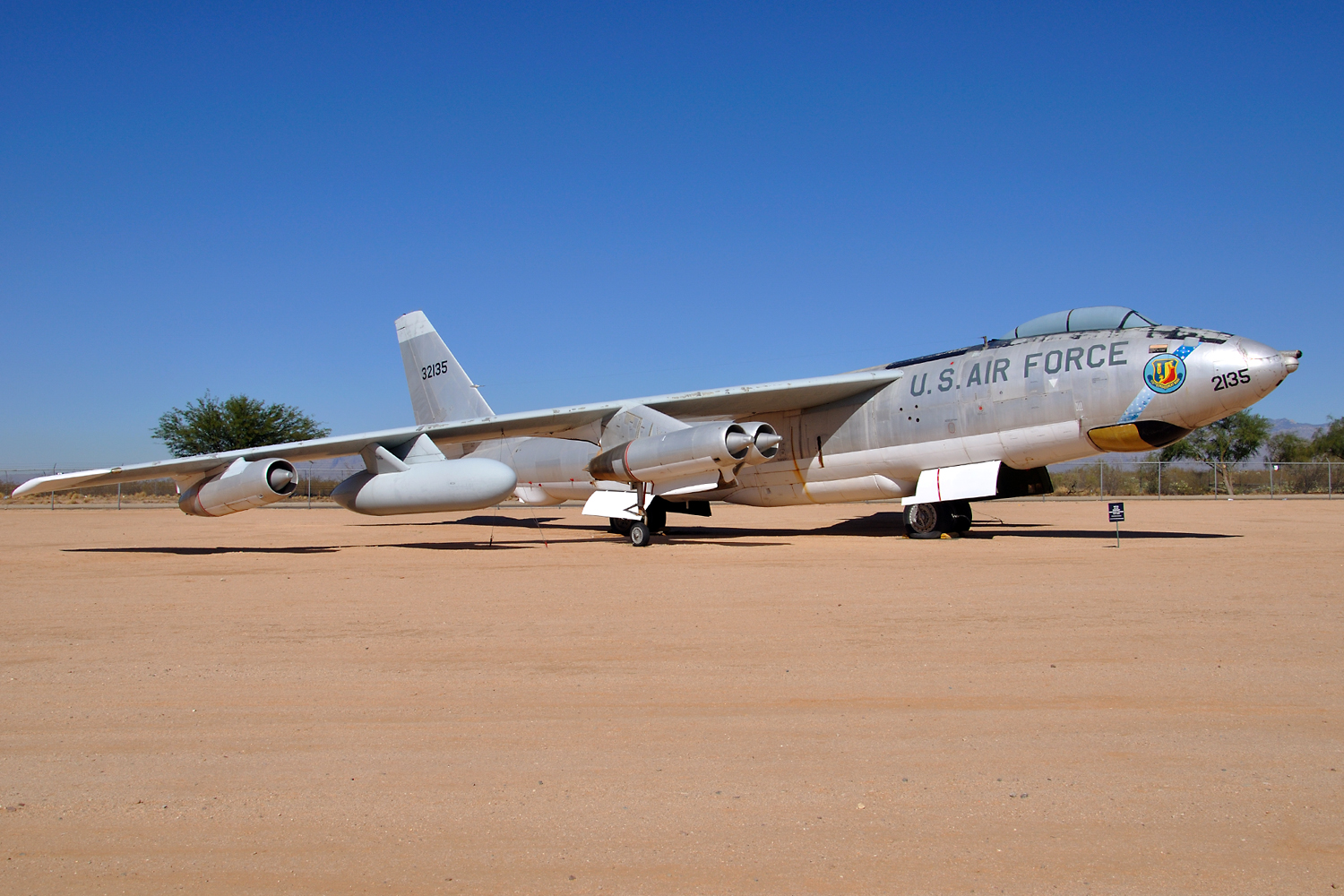
- Boeing EB-47E Stratojet of the 376th Bombardment Wing
- Active: 1952–1965
- Country: United States
- Branch: United States Air Force
- Role: Strategic Reconnaissance and Electronic Warfare

Insignia
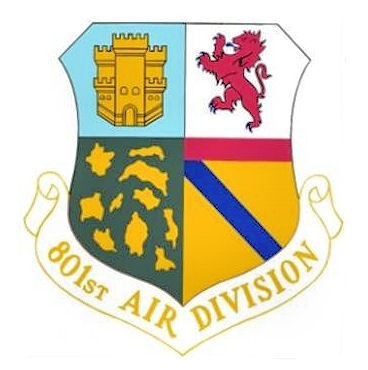
- 801st Air Division emblem (Note: Approved 28 August 1952. Description: On a shield quarterly, first quarter azure (light), a castle, triple towered or, windows and ports outlined sable; second quarter argent, a lion rampant gules, armed and langued azure; third quarter vert, a chain of islands or; fourth quarter or, a bend azure, a chief gules.)

The 801st Air Division is an inactive United States Air Force organization. It was assigned to Strategic Air Command (SAC)'s Eighth Air Force at Lockbourne Air Force Base, Ohio, where it was inactivated on 15 March 1965.

Through most of its existence the division controlled strategic reconnaissance and electronic warfare wings flying Boeing B-47 Stratojets and based at Lockbourne. In 1964, one of its wings became an air refueling wing. When its second wing was inactivated as the B-47 was withdrawn from the United States Air Force inventory, only one SAC wing remained at Lockbourne and the division was inactivated as well.

== History ==
The 801st Air Division was activated at Lockbourne Air Force Base, Ohio in 1952 when Strategic Air Command (SAC) departed from the wing base organization system and created air divisions as the headquarters on bases with two operational wings. The division assumed command of the 26th and 91st Strategic Reconnaissance Wings and the 801st Air Base Group. The 26th wing was activated the same day as the division but remained unmanned until January 1953. The division drew its cadre from the 37th Air Division, which had controlled SAC reconnaissance wings at Lockbourne and Lake Charles Air Force Bases.

The division trained and maintained a force capable of conducting worldwide reconnaissance and electronic countermeasures operations. Its reconnaissance units usually operated their Boeing RB-47 Stratojets through operational detachments providing reconnaissance support for other United States Air Force (USAF) establishments. These detachments were located in various areas, including England, Japan, Morocco, Newfoundland and Greenland. It also trained subordinate units in air-to-air refueling techniques.

In May 1953 the 100th Air Refueling Squadron moved to Lockbourne from Turner Air Force Base, Georgia and was assigned to the division, although it was attached to the 91st wing. The Boeing KB-29 Superfortresses of the 91st Air Refueling Squadron were transferred to the 100th, while the 91st converted to Boeing KC-97 Stratofreighters. Once its training was completed, the 100th returned to Turner in November.

In January 1955 the 70th Strategic Reconnaissance Wing was activated at Little Rock Air Force Base, Arkansas. However, Little Rock was not ready to receive the wing's RB-47 aircraft, so the wing was deployed to Lockbourne and attached to the 801st until construction at Little Rock was completed. The 70th wing trained and received its initial manning during this period and did not become fully operational before moving its operations to Little Rock in October.

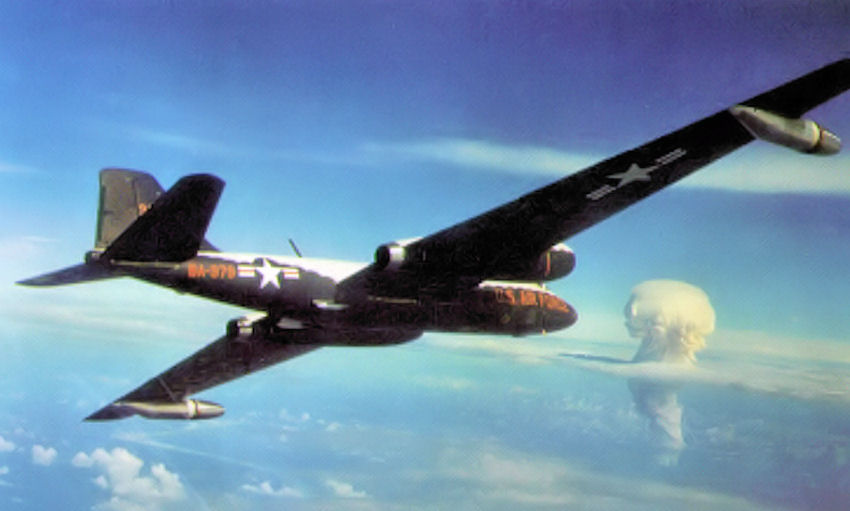
RB-57D collecting data during nuclear weapons test

In 1956 the 4025th Strategic Reconnaissance Squadron, Light was activated at Lockbourne and assigned directly to the division. This squadron was to be SAC's first high altitude reconnaissance unit and was equipped with Martin RB-57D Canberras. In May 1956 the squadron moved to Turner Air Force Base, Georgia where it was assigned to the newly organized 4080th Strategic Reconnaissance Wing.

In November 1957 the 91st wing was inactivated. The following month, the 376th Bombardment Wing moved to Lockbourne from Barksdale Air Force Base, Louisiana. Although designated as a bombardment wing, the 376th's primary mission was electronic warfare. The 91st wing's 91st Air Refueling Squadron remained active and was transferred to the 376th wing upon its arrival at Lockbourne. It was assigned directly to the 801st during the three-week gap between the inactivation of the 91st and the transfer of the 376th.

In April of the following year, as Barksdale converted from B-47s to Boeing B-52 Stratofortresses, Barksdale's other wing, the 301st Bombardment Wing, moved to Lockbourne. Shortly thereafter, the 26th wing inactivated. This completed the division's transition from reconnaissance to electronic warfare, for, like the 376th wing, the 301st was an electronic warfare wing despite its designation.

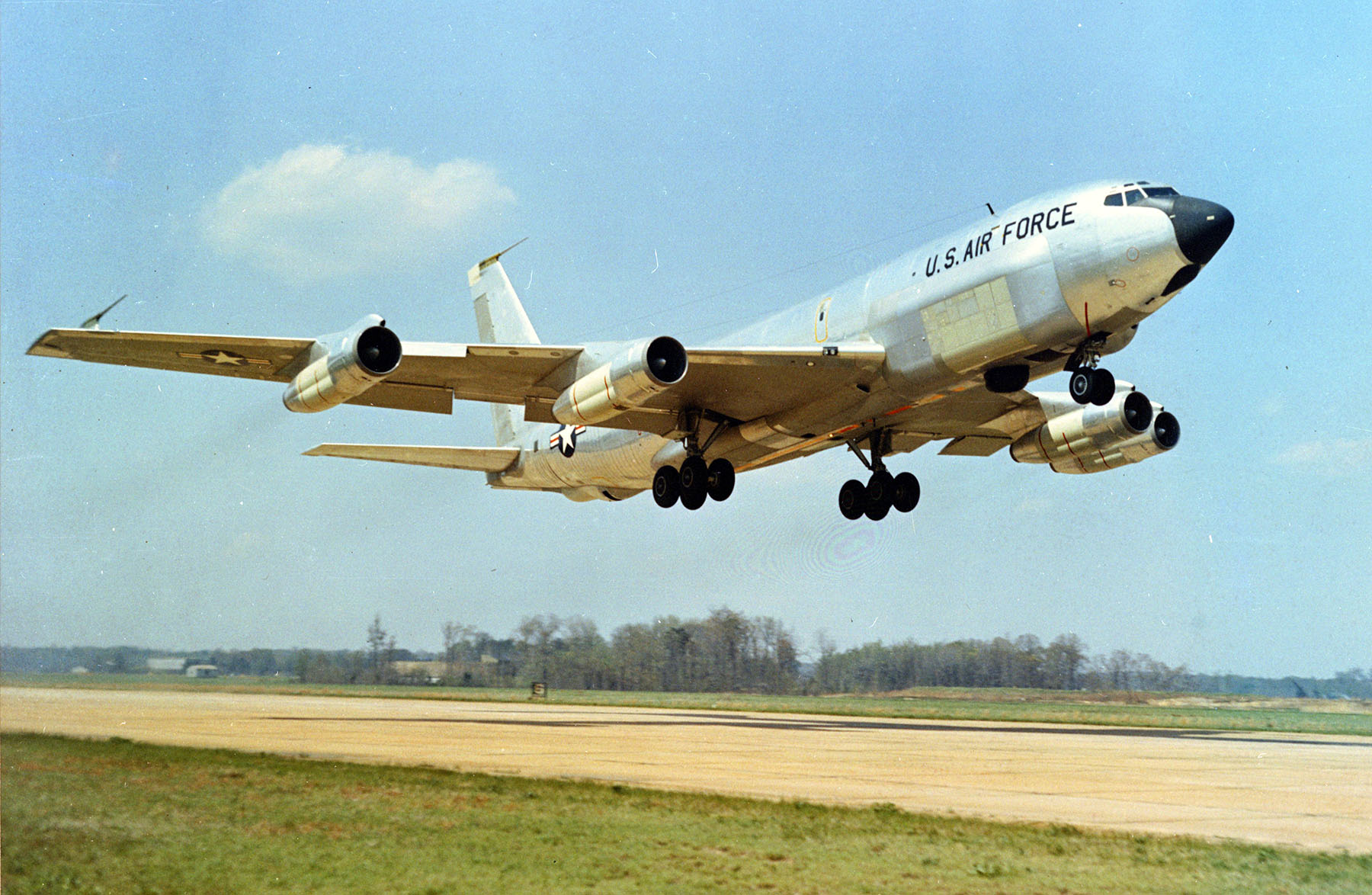
Boeing RC-135C taking off

In July 1962, SAC organized the 4363d Support Squadron at Lockbourne and assigned it to the 801st. The squadron, later renamed the 4363d Post Attack Command Control Squadron, was one of four that provided airborne communications relay to SAC aircraft, enhancing survivability in the event of a nuclear attack. The squadron did not become operational until November 1962 and was attached to the 376th wing the entire time it was assigned to the division. In June 1963 the squadron began to keep a portion of its aircraft on alert. The 4363d was inactivated a little less than three years later in March 1965 when the Post-Attack Command and Control System was transferred to air refueling units flying Boeing EC-135Cs and located at bases with SAC auxiliary command posts.

In April 1963 the transformation of the division's air refueling force began when the first Boeing KC-135A Stratotanker arrived to equip the 91st Air Refueling Squadron. In May 1964, the squadron was detached from the 376th wing to the 301st. The following month it was assigned and the three EB-47 squadrons of that wing were inactivated. which became the 301st Air Refueling Wing. At the same time, the 305th Air Refueling Squadron, stationed at McGuire Air Force Base, New Jersey, was assigned to the division.

The 801st participated in numerous tactical exercises such as Big Blast, Deep River, Sky Shield, and Purple Mood. The division was inactivated in March 1965 when the 376th wing was inactivated as part of the retirement of the B-47, reducing the SAC presence at Lockbourne to a single wing, the 301st, which assumed host base responsibility for Lockbourne until the base transferred to Tactical Air Command in July.

== Lineage ==
- Constituted as 801st Air Division on 9 May 1952

Activated on 28 May 1952
Discontinued and inactivated on 15 March 1965

=== Assignments ===
- Second Air Force, 28 May 1952
- Eighth Air Force, 1 July 1955 – 15 March 1965

=== Stations ===
- Lockbourne Air Force Base, Ohio, 28 May 1952 – 15 March 1965

=== Components ===
Wings

- 26th Strategic Reconnaissance Wing, 28 May 1952 – 1 July 1958
- 70th Strategic Reconnaissance Wing, attached 24 January – c. 19 October 1955

Little Rock Air Force Base, Arkansas

- 91st Strategic Reconnaissance Wing, 28 May 1952 – 8 November 1957
- 301st Bombardment Wing (later 301st Air Refueling Wing), 15 April 1958 – 15 March 1965
- 376th Bombardment Wing, 3 December 1957 – 15 March 1965

Groups

- 801st Air Base Group (later 801st Combat Support Group), 16 Jun 1952 – 15 Mar 1965

Squadrons

- 91st Air Refueling Squadron, 8 November 1957 – 1 December 1957
- 100th Air Refueling Squadron, 23 May 1953 – 24 November 1953 (attached to 91st Strategic Reconnaissance Wing)
- 305th Air Refueling Squadron: 1 July 1964 – 15 March 1965

McGuire Air Force Base, New Jersey

- 4025th Strategic Reconnaissance Squadron, 8 June 1955 – 1 May 1956
- 4363d Support Squadron (Airborne Communications Relay) (later 4363d Post Attack Command Control Squadron), 20 July 1962 – 15 March 1965 (attached to 376th Bombardment Wing)

=== Aircraft ===
- Boeing KB-29 Superfortress, 1952 – 1953
- Boeing B-47 Stratojet, 1953 – 1954 1958 – 1964
- Boeing KC-97 Stratofreighter, 1953 – 1963
- Boeing RB-47 Stratojet, 1952 – 1957
- Martin RB-57D Canberra, 1955 – 1956
- Boeing EB-47 Stratojet, 1957 – 1965
- Boeing KC-135 Stratotanker, 1963 – 1965
- Boeing EC-135, 1964 – 1965

== See also ==
- List of United States Air Force air divisions
- List of USAF Bomb Wings and Wings assigned to Strategic Air Command
- List of USAF Reconnaissance Wings assigned to Strategic Air Command
- List of B-29 Superfortress operators
- List of B-47 units of the United States Air Force
- List of B-57 units of the United States Air Force
