= Jeremiah Johnson =

Jeremiah Johnson may refer to:

- Liver-Eating Johnson (1824–1900), mountain man of the American old west
  - Jeremiah Johnson (film), a 1972 American western film based partly on the person above
- Jeremiah Johnson or Nullsleep (born 1980), American electronic musician and computer artist
- Jeremiah Johnson (American football coach), American football coach
- Jeremiah Johnson (blues musician) (born 1972), American blues singer, guitarist and songwriter
- Jeremiah Johnson (gridiron football) (born 1987), American and Canadian football running back
- Jeremiah Johnson (mayor) (1766–1852), mayor of Brooklyn, New York

== See also ==
- Jerry Johnson (disambiguation)
