= Jerry Johnson =

Jerry or Gerry Johnson may refer to:

== Sportsmen ==
- Jerry Johnson (baseball) (1943–2021), Major League Baseball pitcher
- Jerry Johnson (basketball player) (born 1982), naturalised Kazakhstani basketball player
- Jerry Johnson (basketball coach) (1918–2021), American basketball coach
- Jerry Johnson (defensive tackle) (born 1977), American football player
- Jerry Johnson (running back) (1894–1947), American football player

== Others ==
- Jerry Johnson, candidate in the United States Senate elections, 1974
- Jerry Johnson (politician) (born 1942), member of the Nebraska Legislature, elected in 2012
- Jerry A. Johnson, President of the National Religious Broadcasters
- Gerry Johnson (1918–1990), actress

== See also ==
- Jeremy Johnson (disambiguation)
- Jeremiah Johnson (disambiguation)
- Jerome Johnson (disambiguation)
- Gerald Johnson (disambiguation)
- Gerard Johnson (disambiguation)
