= 305th Air Refueling Squadron =

Inactive US Air Force unit

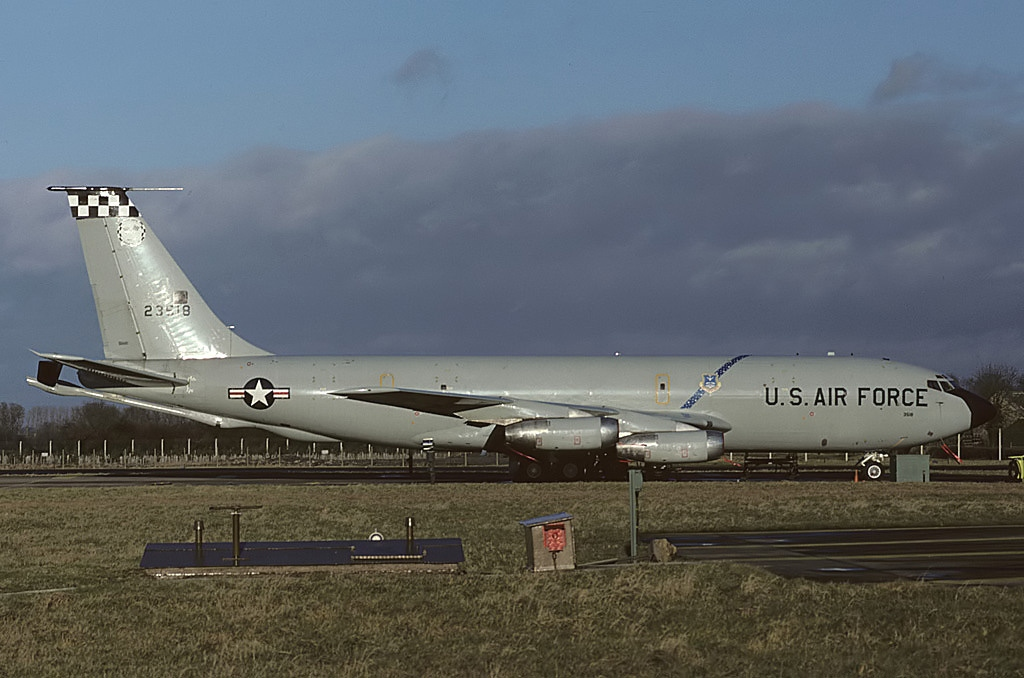
- KC-135A Stratotanker at Grissom AFB
- Active: 1943–1944; 1951–1993
- Country: United States
- Branch: United States Air Force
- Role: Aerial refueling
- Mottos: We Will Be There (old) Around the World, Around the Clock (new)
- Decorations: Air Force Outstanding Unit Award

Insignia
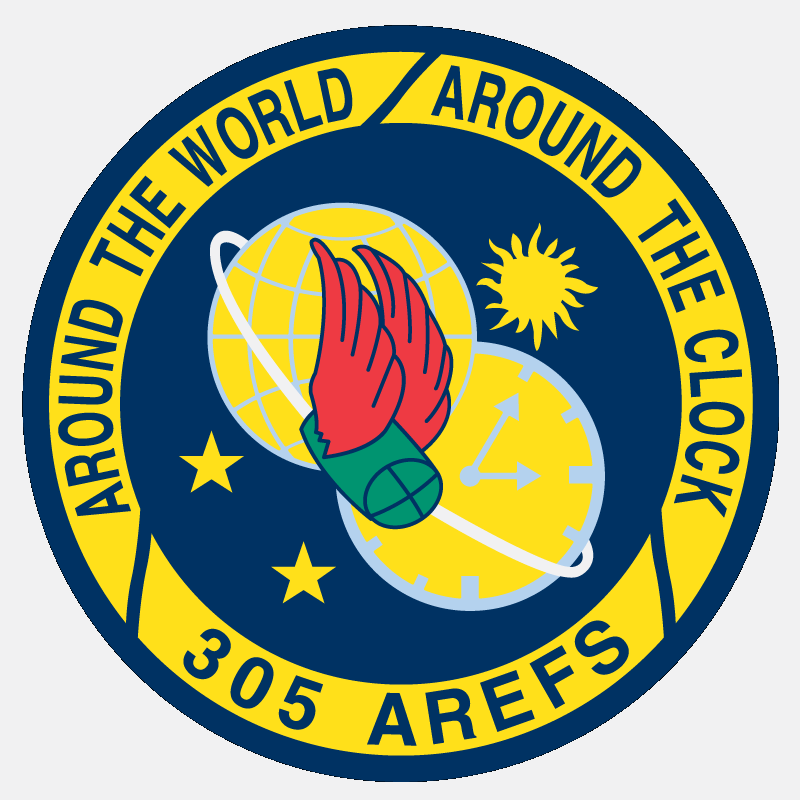
- 305th Air Refueling Sq emblem (new)

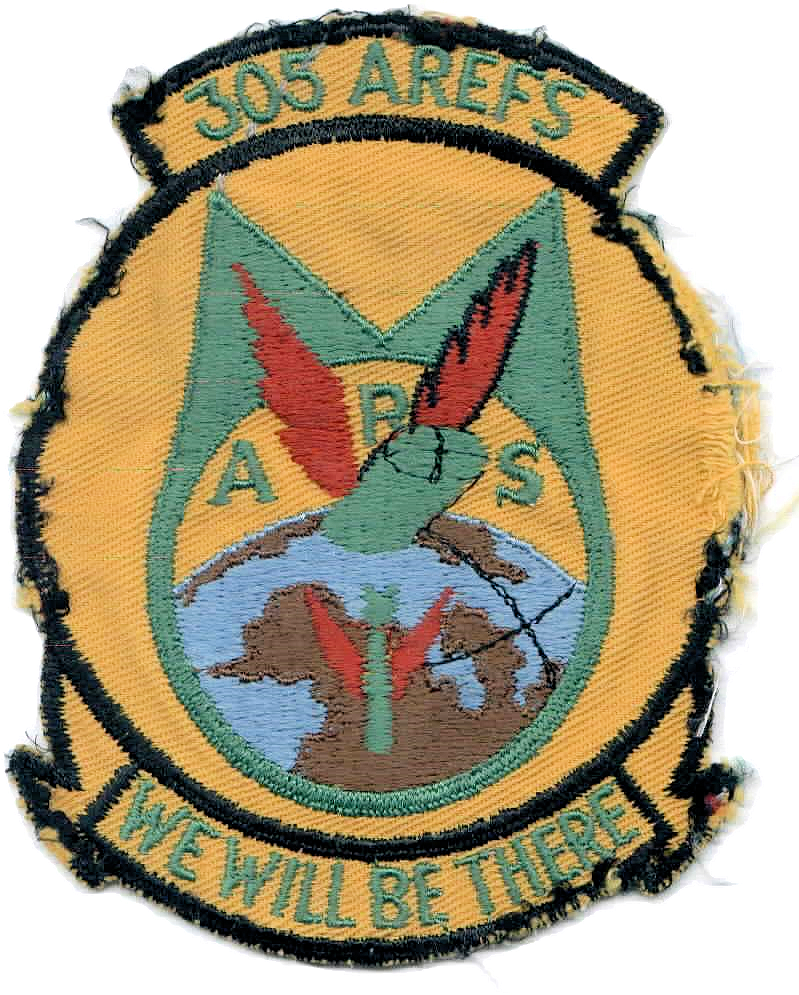
- Patch with 305th Air Refueling Squadron emblem (old)

The 305th Air Refueling Squadron is an inactive United States Air Force unit. It was last assigned to the 305th Air Refueling Wing at Grissom Air Force Base, Indiana, where it was inactivated on 20 August 1993.

The first predecessor of the squadron was the 605th Bombardment Squadron which served as a training unit for heavy bomber aircrews during World War II until it was disbanded in a major reorganization of Army Air Forces training units in 1944.

The 305th Squadron was activated in 1953 in 1953 with Boeing KC-97 Stratofreighter aircraft. It converted to the Boeing KC-135 Stratotankers and continued in the refueling role until inactivated. The two squadrons were consolidated into a single unit in 1985.

== History ==
=== Bombardment training ===
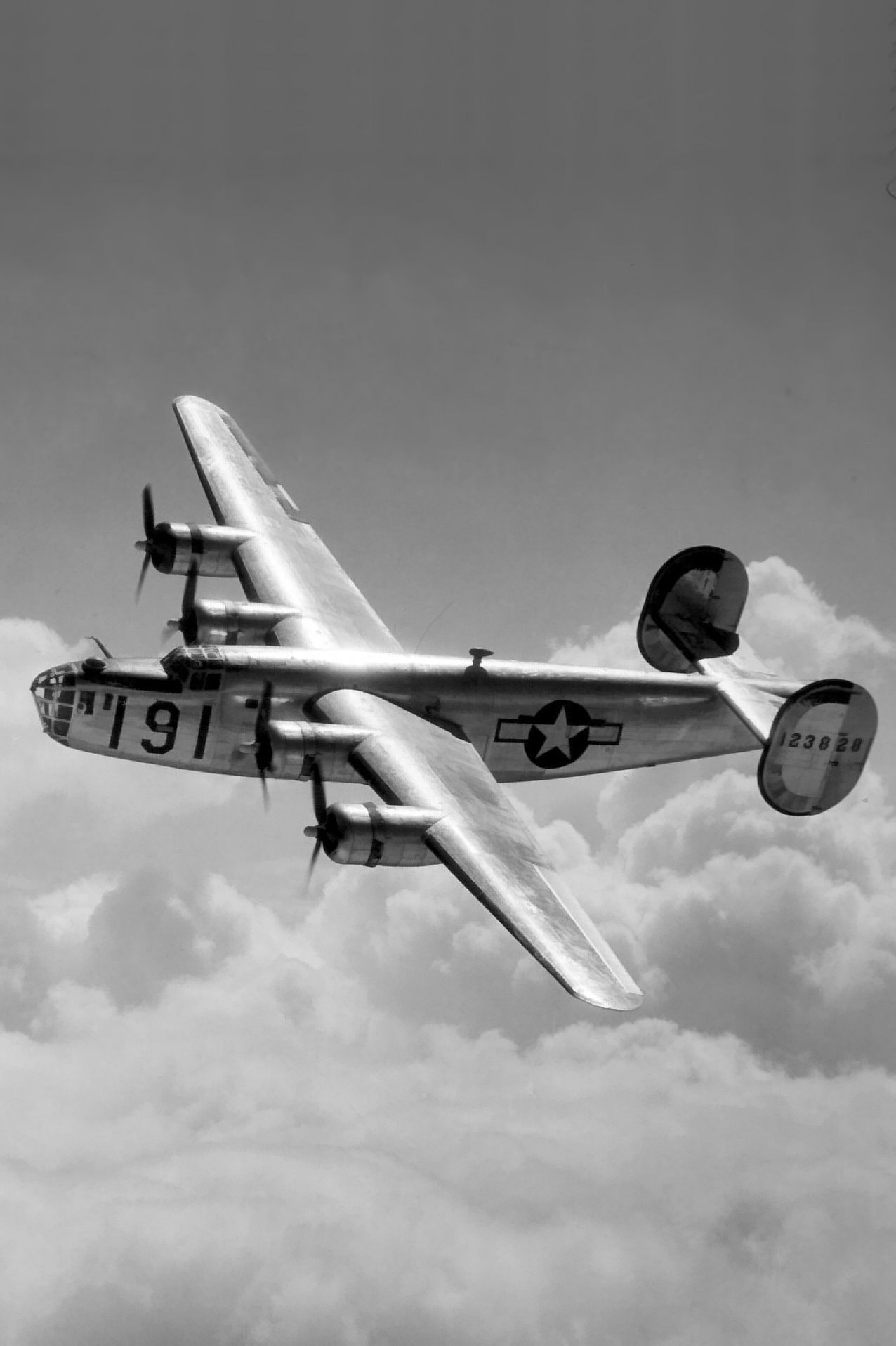
B-24 Liberator as flown by the 605th Squadron

The squadron's first predecessor was the 605th Bombardment Squadron, which was activated at Davis-Monthan Field, Arizona on 1 March 1943, but made two moves the following month, arriving at Wendover Field, Utah on 17 April. The squadron was one of the four original squadrons of the 399th Bombardment Group. At Wendover, it served as an Operational Training Unit (OTU) for Consolidated B-24 Liberator units until August. The OTU program involved the use of an oversized parent unit to provide cadres to "satellite groups"

The squadron became a Replacement Training Unit (RTU). Like OTUs, RTUs were oversize units, however their mission was to train individual pilots and aircrews. Following this mission change, the 399th Group and its components were reassigned from Second Air Force to Fourth Air Force, then moved to March Field, California in December.

However, the Army Air Forces was finding that standard military units like the 605th, which were assigned personnel and equipment based on relatively inflexible tables of organization were not proving well adapted to the training mission. Accordingly, it adopted a more functional system in which each base was organized into a separate numbered unit, which was manned and equipped based on the station's requirements. The 605th Squadron was disbanded, and along with operational and supporting units at March was used to form the 420th AAF Base Unit (Bombardment Replacement Training Unit-Heavy).

=== Air refueling ===
The 305th Air Refueling Squadron was originally attached to the 305th Air Bombardment Wing at MacDill Air Force Base, Florida on 2 July 1951. At that time the squadron operated Boeing KC-97 Stratofreighters that were a variant of the C-97 Stratofreighter (which was itself based on the B-50 Superfortress bomber), greatly modified with all the necessary tanks, plumbing, and "flying boom."

When the 305th Bombardment Wing moved in June 1959 to operate Bunker Hill Air Force Base (which was renamed Grissom Air Force Base in 1968), Indiana, the 305th was not part of the Wing. Later that same year, the first KC-135 Stratotankers were assigned to the Wing. At this time the 68th Air Refueling Squadron was assigned to Bunker Hill. Two years later in 1961, B-58s began replacing the B-47s for the bomber squadrons.

On 25 March 1965 the 305th replacing the 68th as the refueling unit for the 305th Wing at Bunker Hill where it remained until it was inactivated. The 305th Wing lost all of its bomber units in 1970 when Strategic Air Command (SAC) underwent a major reorganization. Thereafter the Wing concentrated on air refueling and post attack command and control support and was redesignated the 305th Air Refueling Wing. Throughout the 1970s until the 1990s, the 305th's operational units were the 70th and 305th Air Refueling Squadron and the 3d Airborne Command and Control Squadron.

From the early 1970s, the 305th supported worldwide tanker task forces and military operations by deploying KC-135 aircraft to Europe (e. g. Torrejon AB, Spain), Alaska, Greenland, Southeast Asia (e.g. U-Tapao Royal Thai Navy Airfield, Thailand) and the Pacific (e.g. Kadena Air Base, Okinawa, Andersen Air Force Base, Guam and Hickam Air Force Base, Hawaii). The unit along with many others provided refuelling support for Operation Rolling Thunder and Operation Arc Light in Southeast Asia from 1965 to 1973. The unit later provided tanker support to units involved in the invasion of Grenada (October 1983) and the invasion of Panama (December 1989). Later in the 1990s the unit deployed personnel and aircraft to provide refuelling support for air operations to and in Southwest Asia and the Middle East. The squadron also delivered food to Kurdish Northern Iraq.

In the 1970s and 1980s Grissom was one of the largest tanker bases in the country. The 305th aircraft and crew participated every day in sustained alerts for SAC not only at Grissom but in support of bomber squadrons assigned to other SAC bases throughout the USA and Canada, e.g. Goose Bay Airport, McConnell Air Force Base, Ellsworth Air Force Base, Grand Forks Air Force Base and others. Its crews provided the primary refueling support for 3d Airborne Command and Control Squadron Operation Looking Glass missions.

The typical crew consisted of a set pilot, co-pilot, navigator (officers) and boom operator (enlisted). Typical missions included refuelling for B-52s, EC-135s, F-4s, RF-4s, RC-135s, SR-71s, U-2s, F-104s, and F-105s. Missions oftentimes included passenger runs and cargo runs.

Grissom was realigned under Air Mobility Command (AMC) in 1992 following the inactivation of SAC. The Wing moved to McGuire Air Force Base, New Jersey in 1994, but the 305th did not move with the Wing and became inactive.

== Lineage ==
605th Bombardment Squadron

- Constituted as the 605th Bombardment Squadron (Heavy) on 15 February 1943

Activated on 1 March 1943

- Disbanded on 31 March 1944
- Reconstituted on 19 September 1985 and consolidated with the 305th Air Refueling Squadron as the 305th Air Refueling Squadron

305th Air Refueling Squadron

- Constituted as the 305th Air Refueling Squadron, Medium
- Activated on 2 July 1951
- Redesignated 305th Air Refueling Squadron, Heavy on 25 March 1965
- Consolidated with the 605th Air Bombardment Squadron on 19 September 1985
- Redesignated 305th Air Refueling Squadron on 1 September 1991
- Inactivated on 20 August 1993

=== Assignments ===
- 399th Bombardment Group: 1 March 1943 – 31 Marcy 1944
- 305th Bombardment Group: 2 July 1951 (attached to 305th Bombardment Wing)
- 305th Bombardment Wing: 16 June 1952 (attached to 306th Bombardment Wing, 5 January 1954 – 21 February 1955 and c. 20 December 1956 – c. 9 January 1957
- 306th Bombardment Wing: 1 May 1959
- 4050th Air Refueling Wing: 15 January 1960
- 499th Air Refueling Wing: 1 January 1963
- 810th Air Division: 1 July 1964
- 305th Bombardment Wing (later 305th Air Refueling Wing): 25 March 1965
- 305th Operations Group: 1 September 1991 – 20 August 1993

=== Stations ===
- Davis-Monthan Field, Arizona, 1 March 1943
- Gowen Field, Idaho, 10 April 1943
- Wendover Field, Utah, 17 April 1943
- March Field, California, 1 December 1943 – 31 March 1944
- MacDill Air Force Base, Florida, 2 July 1951
- McGuire Air Force Base, New Jersey, 15 January 1960
- Bunker Hill Air Force Base (later Grissom Air Force Base), Indiana, 25 March 1965 – 20 August 1993

=== Aircraft ===
- Consolidated B-24 Liberator
- Boeing KC-97 Stratofreighter
- Boeing KC-135 Stratotanker, 1965 - 1993
