= Jerome Johnson =

Jerome Johnson may refer to:

- Edgar Augustus Jerome Johnson (1900 – 1972), American economist
- Jerome L. Johnson (born 1935), retired United States Navy four star admiral
- Jerome Johnson (American football) (born 1985), American football fullback
- Jerome Johnson (Brookside)

== See also ==
- Jerry Johnson (disambiguation)
