= 305th Air Mobility Wing =

305th Air Mobility Wing

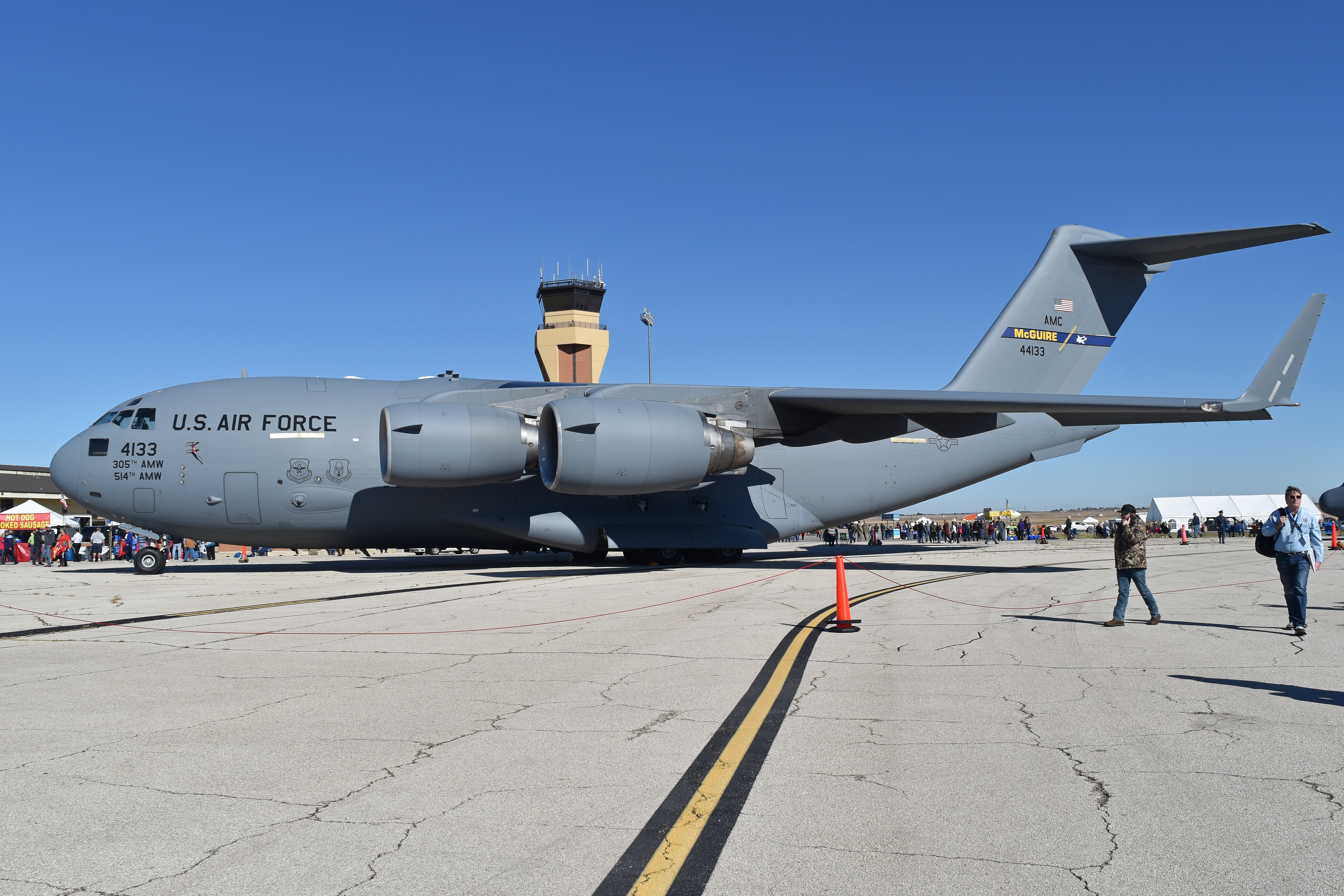
- A wing C-17A Globemaster III seen on static display at Sheppard AFB's 2019 Guardians of Freedom Airshow.
- Active: 1951–present
- Country: United States
- Branch: United States Air Force
- Role: Airlift and Air Refueling
- Part of: Air Mobility Command
- Garrison/HQ: McGuire Air Force Base, New Jersey
- Motto: Can Do
- Engagements: Operation Urgent Fury
- Decorations: Air Force Outstanding Unit Award

Commanders
- Current commander: Allen C. Morris, Jr
- Notable commanders: Lt Gen Gerald W. Johnson

Insignia
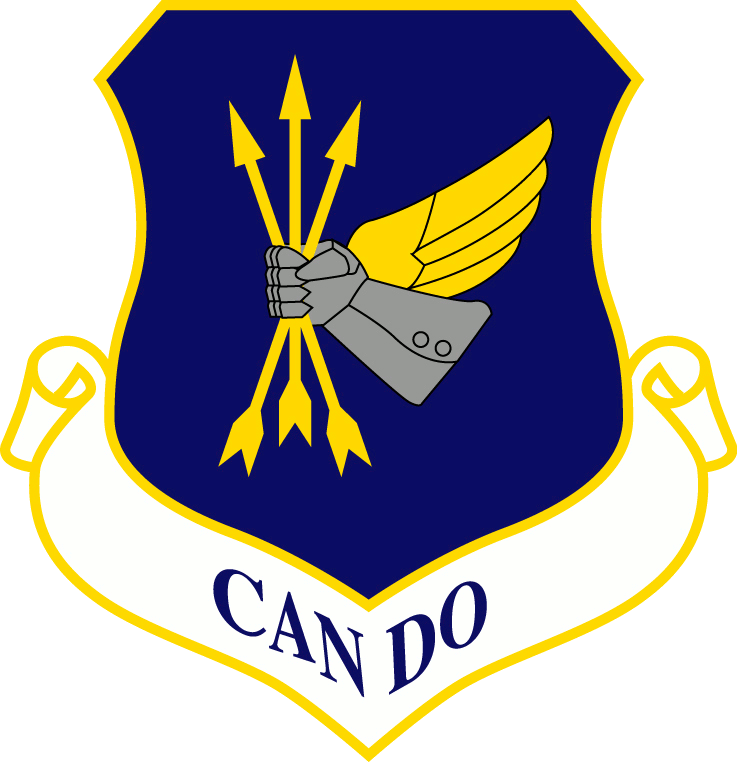
- 305th Air Mobility Wing emblem (Note: Approved 15 June 1994. Description: Azure, a dexter gauntlet bendwise Argent (silver gray) winged Or grasping a sheaf of three arrow of the like [color] all within a diminished bordure of the last [color].)

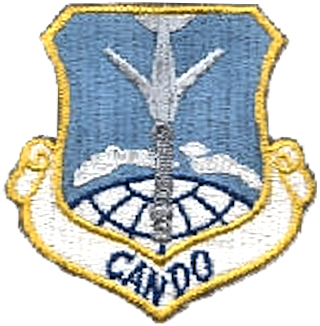
- Patch with 305th Air Refueling Wing emblem (Note: Approved 13 April 1978. Description: celeste, issuing from base a demisphere argent, gridlined and rimmed azure, below an arched cloud formation of the second [color], overall issuing from chief in pale, a refueling boom arraswise gray, all within a diminished bordure or.)

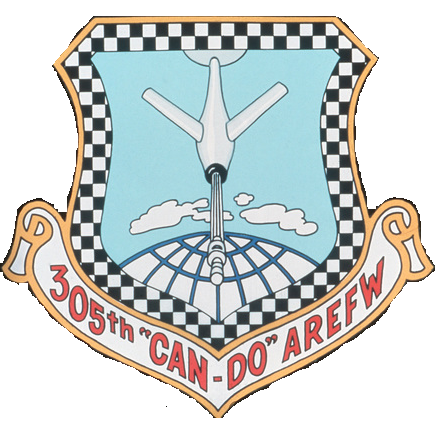
- 305th Air Refueling Wing emblem (Note: Approved 25 March 1970.)

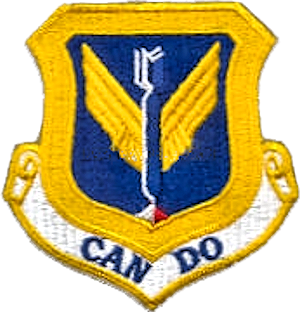
- Patch with 305th Bombardment Wing emblem (Note: Approved 23 April 1951. Description: Azure, in pale a bomb proper, winged or, in base a target proper, all within a border of the second [color]. This emblem was approved for the 305th Group but used by the wing until modified with a checked border on 4 March 1958. Endicottt, p. 234.)

The 305th Air Mobility Wing is a United States Air Force strategic airlift and air refueling wing under the operational control of the Air Mobility Command. It generates, mobilizes and deploys Boeing C-17 Globemaster III and Boeing KC-46A Pegasus aircraft. The 305th AMW is a tenant unit at mostly the McGuire Air Force Base component of Joint Base McGuire-Dix-Lakehurst in central New Jersey. It also controls one of the Air Force's busiest aerial ports, and the air operations at both McGuire Air Force Base and Naval Support Activity Lakehurst.

The wing's motto is "Can Do," a description formulated in World War II when its predecessor unit, the 305th Bombardment Group, earned its reputation as courageous, innovative warriors. The legendary 305th Bomb Group was first commanded by then-Colonel Curtis E. LeMay. The wing is the only Air Force unit with two Medal of Honor recipients – Lieutenants William Lawley and Edward Michael, who earned them on separate B-17 missions during World War II.

== History ==
=== 305th Bombardment Wing ===
==== MacDill Air Force Base operations ====
The 305th Bombardment Wing was established on 20 December 1950 and activated on 2 January 1951 at MacDill Air Force Base, Florida. The wing took charge of the 305th Bombardment Group's former flying squadrons when the Air Force reorganized its wings into the tri-deputate system. Initially training with the Boeing B-29 and B-50 Superfortress, the 305th received its first Boeing KC-97 Stratofreighter later that year. Following this, the group began training heavily in its new dual mission of strategic bombardment and aerial refueling.

In June 1952, the wing became the second Strategic Air Command (SAC) wing to receive the Boeing B-47A Stratojet bomber. Operational squadrons of the wing were the 305th, 364th, 365th and 366th Bombardment Squadrons, while the 306th Bombardment Squadron was intended to act as a training unit to prepare future B-47 crews. The B-47As were primarily training aircraft and were not considered as being combat-ready, since most of them were unarmed and were initially without almost any of their vital electronic components

In 1953, the 305th was upgraded to the B-47B production Stratojet and the wing began operational strategic bombardment and refueling missions from MacDill. The wing deployed overseas three times, once to England (September–December 1953) and twice to North Africa (November 1955 – January 1956 and January–March 1957), in keeping with its mission of global bombardment and air-refueling operations. The wing's deployments marked the first overseas deployment of the B-47B.

Two of the wing's B-47s set speed records on 28 July 1953 when one flew from RCAF Goose Bay, Labrador, to RAF Fairford, England, in 4:14 hours and the other flew from Limestone Air Force Base, Maine, to RAF Fairford in 4:45 hours.

During this period, the 305th also figured prominently in the filming of the 1955 James Stewart and June Allyson film, Strategic Air Command, a portion of which was filmed in and around both the 305th Bombardment Wing and 306th Bombardment Wing areas and their B-47 aircraft at MacDill.

In 1955, SAC upgraded the 305th to the B-47E, the major production version of the Stratojet.

A major tragedy struck the 305th on the evening of 10 October 1956, when 50 of its personnel returning from a 90-day temporary duty assignment in England on a Military Air Transportation Service flight died when the United States Navy Douglas R6D-1 Liftmaster carrying them disappeared over the Atlantic Ocean. A search discovered wreckage from the aircraft, but no survivors or bodies ever were found.

==== Bunker Hill (Grissom) Air Force Base operations ====
In May 1959, the 305th Bomb Wing (with B-47s) was reassigned to Bunker Hill Air Force Base, Indiana and assumed responsibility for operating the base. Later that same year, the first Boeing KC-135A Stratotankers were assigned to the unit, replacing the propeller-driven KC-97s that had difficulties keeping up with the B-47 jet aircraft. The 305th began transferring its Stratojets to other wings as replacement aircraft in early 1960 in a planned equipment change.

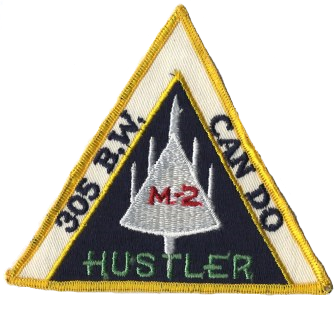
305th Bomb Wing (B-58) Hustler aircrew patch

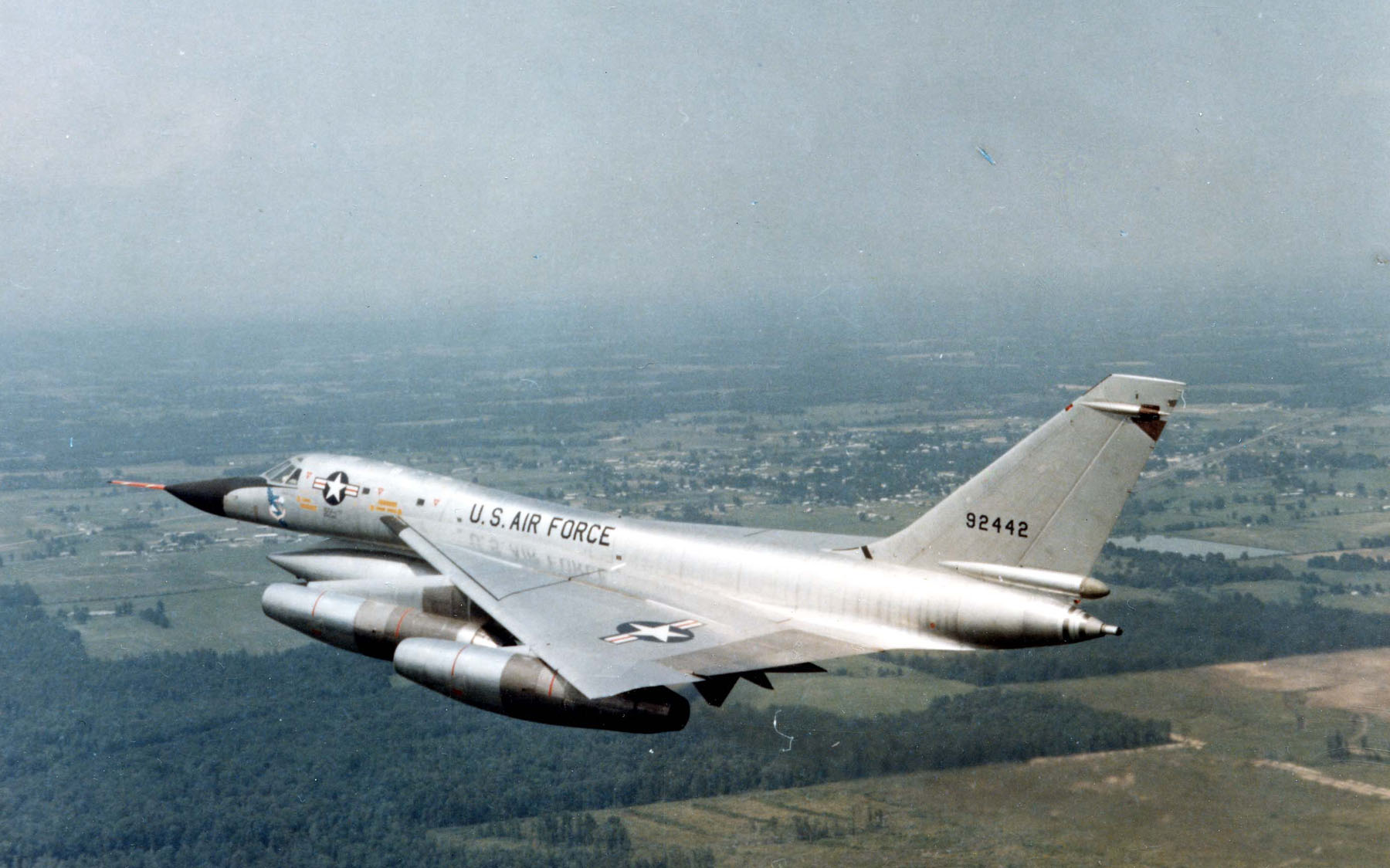
Convair B-58 Hustler (AF Ser. No. 59-2442) in 1967

In September 1960, the 305th became the second USAF wing selected to receive the Convair B-58A Hustler with the first aircraft received on 11 May 1961. Two months later, the first TB-58A trainer arrived. Three squadrons (364th, 365th and 366th) were equipped with B-58As, and, the wing was declared operationally ready in August 1962.

A wing B-58 set five records on 16 October 1963 by flying from Tokyo, Japan, to London, England (via Alaska and Greenland), in 8:35 hours at an average speed of approximately 938 mph (1,510 km/h).

In a little-known attempt to increase the flexibility of the B-58 as a weapons system, experiments were carried out in April 1964 under a program known as Operation Bullseye to see if the B-58 could carry and deliver conventional bombs. In coordination with Republic F-105Ds and McDonnell F-4C/Ds, sorties were flown using B-58s as lead ships and pathfinders and as independent strike aircraft. It was demonstrated that the B-58 could carry iron bombs on the wing root bomb racks that had earlier been added to accommodate four Mk. 43 nuclear weapons. Iron bombs of varying weights up to 3.000 pounds were dropped, usually from low altitudes and at speeds of 600 knots. Almost all of the drops were visual, with the AN/ASQ-42 system rarely being used. However, the fear that the B-58's integral wing tanks would make it vulnerable to ground fire during low-altitude delivery lead to the abandonment of the program.

The wing operated a B-58 combat crew training school (CCTS), August 1965 – December 1969, and gained a Boeing EC-135 Post-Attack Command Control System (PACCS) mission with the 3d PACCS Squadron in mid-1966.

After 26 years of bearing the name Bunker Hill, the base was renamed Grissom Air Force Base on 12 May 1968 after Lieutenant Colonel Virgil I. "Gus" Grissom, USAF, a native of Mitchell, Indiana, who was one of the original seven Mercury astronauts. Having later commanded the Gemini 3 mission in 1965, Lieutenant Colonel Grissom was assigned as commander for the first crewed Apollo mission, but was killed with the rest of his crew during a fire in his Apollo 1 capsule during a pre-launch rehearsal on Pad 34 at Cape Kennedy, Florida in January 1967.

The active service life of the B-58 was destined to be rather short. Phaseout of the B-58 fleet was ordered by Secretary of Defense Robert McNamara in December 1965, since it was felt that the high-altitude performance of the B-58 could no longer guarantee success against increasingly sophisticated Soviet air defenses, particularly high-altitude surface-to-air missiles such as the SA-2 Guideline.

At that time, Secretary McNamara also announced that the F-111 would be built for both the U.S. Air Force and U.S. Navy. McNamara further proposed that a SAC variant of the new F-111, to be designated FB-111A, along with improvements in the Air Force Minuteman and Navy Polaris missile systems and modernization of the subsonic Boeing B-52, would enhance strategic deterrence and make the B-58 superfluous to the needs of the USAF.

The first B-58 to go into long-term storage was B-58A (AF Serial No. 59-2446) which flew to Davis–Monthan Air Force Base, Arizona on 5 November 1969. Once underway, the B-58 retirement program moved relatively rapidly. The retirement was completed on 16 January 1970, when the 305th Bomb Wing's last two B-58s (AF Serial No. 55-0662 and 61-078) were flown to Davis-Monthan for storage.

=== 305th Air Refueling Wing ===
With the loss of its bombardment squadrons, the 305th Bomb Wing was converted to an inflight-refueling wing using KC-135As, and, it was redesignated as the 305th Air Refueling Wing on 1 January 1970. It was assigned to Strategic Air Command, Second Air Force, 42nd Air Division.

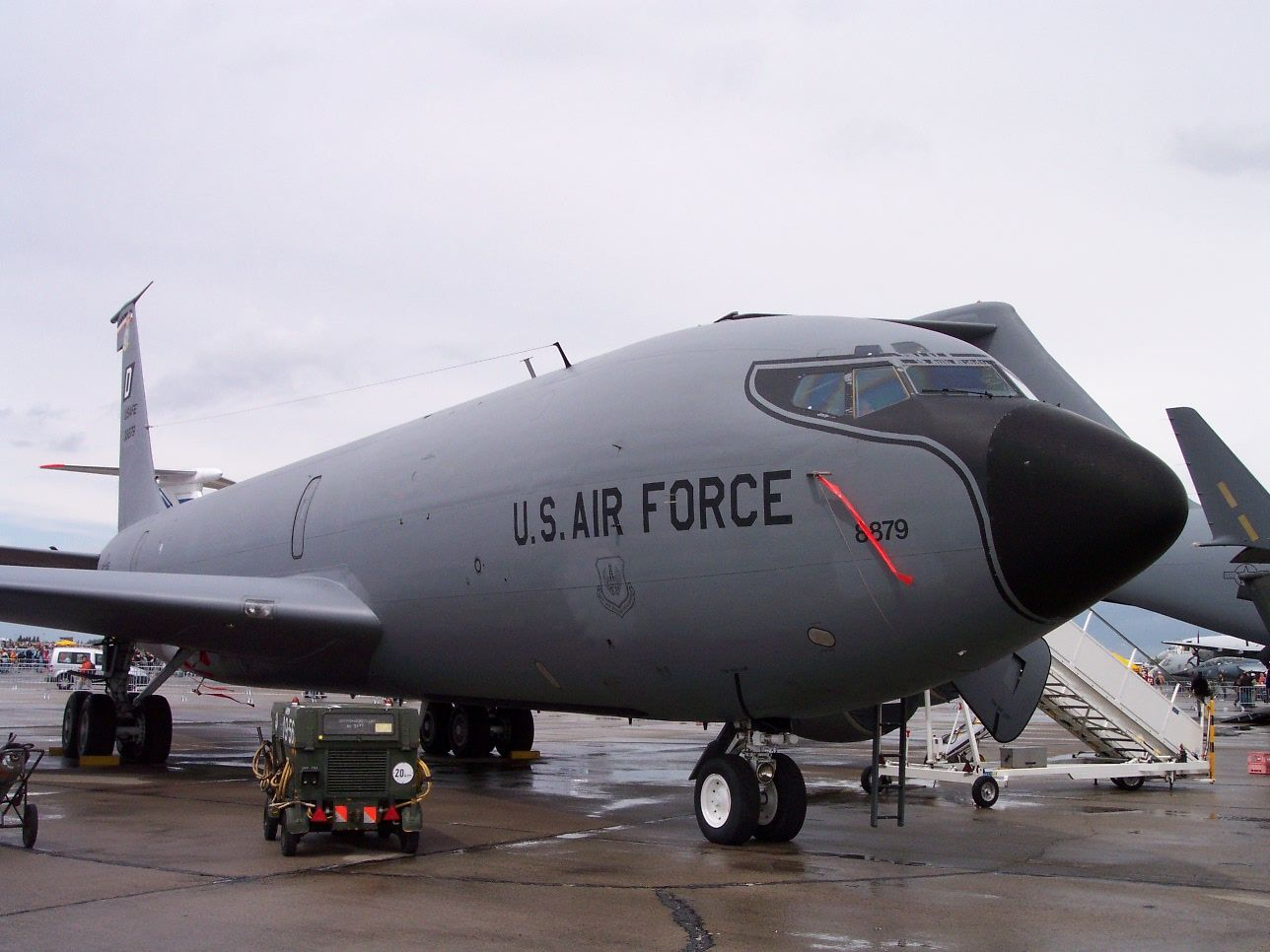
KC-135 Stratotanker

From the early 1970s, the wing supported worldwide tanker task forces by deploying KC-135 aircraft to Europe, Alaska, Greenland, and the Pacific. In 1975, the 3d ACCS was inactivated and its specialized EC-135s were transferred to the 70th Air Refueling Squadron for the Post-Attack Command and Control System mission. Also in 1975, the unit was transferred to the Eighth Air Force.

The unit was redesignated as the 305th Air Refueling Wing, Heavy on 1 February 1978.

The wing provided tanker-refueling support to units involved in the Invasion of Grenada (October 1983) and the restoration of democracy in Panama (December 1989).

From August 1990 to June 1991, the unit deployed personnel and aircraft to provide refueling support for air operations to and in Southwest Asia. During the First Gulf War, aircraft and personnel from the 305th were primarily assigned to the 1703rd and 1709th Provisional Air Refueling Wings at King Khalid Military City (KKMC) and at Royal Saudi Air Force Air Force Base Jeddah, respectively. The 305th Wing also delivered food to the Kurds in Northern Iraq, April–May 1991.

The Post-Attack Command and Control System mission was inactivated, and, the EC-135 aircraft were retired in May 1992. The unit was redesignated the 305th Air Refueling Wing on 1 September 1991.

=== 305th Air Mobility Wing ===
On 1 June 1992, Strategic Air Command (SAC) was inactivated and the 305th realigned to the newly established Air Mobility Command (AMC), merging former SAC air refueling aircraft with strategic and tactical theater airlift aircraft operated by the former Military Airlift Command (MAC), the latter also having been inactivated on the same date. The wing was also redesignated as the 305th Air Mobility Wing (305 AMW) on 1 October 1994.

The 1993 Base Realignment and Closure Commission directed realignment of Grissom Air Force Base to the Air Force Reserve and the 305th Air Refueling Wing phased out operations there in 1994. The KC-135R-equipped 70th and 305th Air Refueling Squadrons were inactivated. In addition, the EC-135G/L radio-relay aircraft, as part of the PACCS system, were also retired.

The 305th Air Mobility Wing was moved without personnel or equipment to McGuire Air Force Base, New Jersey, replacing the 438th Airlift Wing on 1 October 1994. At McGuire, the wing controls three squadrons of Boeing C-17A Globemaster III transports and Boeing KC-46A Pegasus air-refueling aircraft.

The 305th Air Mobility Wing is currently operational at Joint Base McGuire-Dix-Lakehurst, New Jersey which has more than 55 years of service. It also operates in parallel with its Air Force Reserve Command "Associate" wing, the 514th Air Mobility Wing (514 AMW), which operates the same C-17 aircraft. The 305th AMW also works with the 108th Wing (108 WG), an Air Mobility Command-gained unit of the New Jersey Air National Guard, operating the KC-46A Pegasus, also on McGuire AFB.

On 3 March 2009, the 305th Air Mobility Wing underwent significant changes due to BRAC 2005. The wing no longer provides installation support for McGuire – the 87th Air Base Wing (87th ABW) now provides the installation support. When the two wings divided, the 305th Mission Support Group and 305th Medical Group transferred to the 87th ABW to become the 87th Mission Support Group and 87th Medical Group. The 305th Maintenance Group and 305th Operations Groups continue to provide a responsive, combat-ready mobility and expeditionary capability for United States. However, by virtue of the same BRAC 2005 legislation, the 305th Air Mobility Wing not only controls air operations at McGuire AFB, but also those at Naval Air Engineering Station Lakehurst (with the exception of the Naval Air Warfare Center test strip). In effect, this places the 305th AMW Commander as the single airfield authority at both McGuire AFB and Lakehurst.

=== Units today ===
The following squadrons make up the 305th Operations Group (305 OG):

- 6th Airlift Squadron, flying C-17 Globemaster III cargo aircraft
- 2nd Air Refueling Squadron, flying KC-46 Pegasus air refueling aircraft
- 32nd Air Refueling Squadron, flying KC-46 Pegasus air refueling aircraft
- 305th Operations Support Squadron, supporting flying operations for wing aircrew

The following squadrons make up the 305th Maintenance Group (305 MXG):

- 305th Maintenance Operations Squadron
- 305th Maintenance Squadron
- 305th Aircraft Maintenance Squadron
- 605th Aircraft Maintenance Squadron
- 305th Aerial Port Squadron

== Lineage ==
- Constituted as the 305th Bombardment Wing, Medium on 20 December 1950

Activated on 2 January 1951
Redesignated 305th Air Refueling Wing on 1 January 1970
Redesignated 305th Air Refueling Wing, Heavy on 1 February 1978
Redesignated 305th Air Refueling Wing on 1 September 1991
Redesignated 305th Air Mobility Wing on 1 October 1994

=== Assignments ===
- Second Air Force, 2 January 1951
- 6th Air Division, 10 February 1951

Attached to: 7th Air Division, 4 September – 5 December 1953
Attached to: 5th Air Division, 3 November 1955 – 8 January 1956 and 7 January – 8 March 1957

- Second Air Force, 1 June 1959
- 17th Air Division, 15 July 1959
- 19th Air Division, 1 January 1961
- 825th Strategic Aerospace Division, 1 September 1964
- 42d Air Division, l January 1970
- 40th Air Division, 1 July 1973
- 42d Air Division, 1 December 1982
- Eighth Air Force, 16 June 1988
- Fifteenth Air Force, 1 September 1991
- Twenty-First Air Force, 1 July 1993
- Eighteenth Air Force, 1 October 2003–present

=== Components ===
Groups

- 305th Bombardment (later, 305th Operations) Group: 2 January 1951 – 16 June 1952; 1 September 1991 – 15 October 1993; 1 October 1994–present
- 458th Operations Group: 1 October 1994 – 1 July 1995

Squadrons

- 3rd Airborne Command and Control Squadron: 1 April 1970 – 31 December 1975
- 68th Air Refueling Squadron: 1 June 1959 – 25 March 1965
- 70th Air Refueling Squadron: 1 January 1970 – 1 September 1991
- 305th Air Refueling Squadron: attached 2 July 1951 – 15 June 1952, assigned 16 June 1952 – 1 May 1959 (detached 4 January – c. 16 April 1955); assigned 25 March 1965 – 1 September 1991
- 364th Bombardment Squadron: attached 10 February 1951 – 15 June 1952, assigned 16 June 1952 – 1 January 1970
- 365th Bombardment Squadron: attached 10 February 1951 – 15 June 1952, assigned 16 June 1952 – 1 January 1970
- 366th Bombardment Squadron: attached 10 February 1951 – 15 June 1952, assigned 16 June 1952 – 1 January 1970
- 422rd Bombardment Squadron: 1 January – l October 1959; 8 March 1960 – 15 February 1961.

=== Bases assigned ===
- MacDill Air Force Base, Florida, 2 January 1951 – 1 June 1959
- Bunker Hill Air Force Base (later Grissom Force Base), Indiana, 1 June 1959 – 1 October 1994
- McGuire Air Force Base (part of Joint Base McGuire-Dix-Lakehurst), New Jersey, 1 October 1994 – present

=== Aircraft operated ===
- Boeing B-29 Superfortress, 1951–1953
- Boeing B-50 Superfortress, 1951–1953
- Boeing KC-97 Stratotanker, 1951–1959
- Boeing B-47 Stratojet, 1952–1961, (RB-47, 1958)
- Boeing KC-135 Stratotanker, 1959–1993, (EC-135, 1966–1992)
- Convair B/TB-58A Hustler, 1961–1970
- Lockheed C-141B Starlifter, 1994–2004
- McDonnell Douglas KC-10A Extender, 1994–2023
- Boeing C-17A Globemaster III, 2004–present
- Boeing KC 46 Pegasus, 2021–present

== See also ==
- List of B-29 Superfortress operators
- List of B-47 units of the United States Air Force
