= Jeremy Johnson (baseball) =

American baseball player (born 1982)

- Pitcher
- Born: July 19, 1982 (age 43); Concord, North Carolina, U.S.
- Batted: Right Threw: Right

KBO debut
- 2009, for the LG Twins

Last KBO appearance
- 2009, for the LG Twins

KBO statistics
- Win–loss record: 1–2
- Earned run average: 5.28
- Strikeouts: 26
- Stats at Baseball Reference

Teams
- LG Twins (2009)

Jeremy M. Johnson (born July 19, 1982) is an American former professional baseball pitcher. Johnson spent ten years in the minor league organizations of the Detroit Tigers and Houston Astros.

== Career ==
=== Detroit Tigers ===
Johnson graduated from Mooresville High School in Mooresville, North Carolina in 2000. As a high school baseball player he was named an honorable mention on the 2000 USA Today All-USA high school baseball team. Johnson entered the 2000 Major League Baseball draft and was selected by the Detroit Tigers in the 11th round. Johnson reported to the Rookie-level Gulf Coast Tigers, where he went 3-1 with an ERA of 4.15. Toward the end of the season, the Tigers promoted Johnson to the Single-A Oneonta Tigers in the New York–Penn League, where he went 0-1 with a 2.89 ERA.

Johnson opened the 2001 season with Oneonta, where he went 7-1 in twelve starts with a 3.42 ERA before being promoted to the Single-A West Michigan Whitecaps in late August. Johnson finished out the Whitecaps season, going 1-1; he also played a few games for the Single-A Lakeland Flying Tigers. Johnson returned to the Whitecaps for the 2002 season, and posted a 4.26 ERA before being promoted (again) to Lakeland and then, later in the season, the Double-A Erie SeaWolves. At Erie, Johnson went 6-1 with a 3.88 ERA; opening there in the 2003 season he was off to a strong start before being sidelined by a shoulder injury.

Johnson spent a shortened 2004 season back at Lakeland, where he went 3-6 with an ERA of 4.67. His highlight performance occurred on July 30, when he threw six shutout innings in a 9-1 victory over the St. Lucie Mets. Over 2005 and 2006, Johnson continued to alternate between Lakeland and Erie, with mixed results. In 2007, he finally reached the Triple-A Toledo Mud Hens, going 3-3 with an ERA of 3.44 in 39 appearances; for the first time mostly in a relief role. He became a free agent at the end of the 2008 season.

=== Houston Astros ===
After electing free agency, Johnson signed a minor league contract with the Houston Astros.

Johnson spent the first half of the 2009 season with the Triple-A Round Rock Express, where he was 5-8 with a 3.51 ERA. Johnson both started (13 starts) and worked out of the bullpen (eight appearances).

=== LG Twins ===
Johnson signed with LG Twins of the KBO League on July 21, 2009. Johnson made five starts for the Twins, compiling a 1-2 record and 5.28 ERA with 26 strikeouts over 29 innings of work.

=== Houston Astros (second stint) ===
On April 7, 2010, Johnson signed a contract to return to the Houston Astros organization, and was assigned to the team's Double-A affiliate, the Corpus Christi Hooks.
