= Gerald Johnston =

Australian rules footballer

Personal information
- Full name: Gerald Johnston
- Born: 21 June 1891
- Died: 30 December 1968 (aged 77)

Playing career^{1}
Years	Club	Games (Goals)
1914	University	11 (0)
- ^{1} Playing statistics correct to the end of 1914.

Gerald Johnston (21 June 1891 – 30 December 1968) was an Australian rules footballer who played with University in the Victorian Football League (VFL).

== Sources ==
- Holmesby, Russell & Main, Jim (2007). The Encyclopedia of AFL Footballers. 7th ed. Melbourne: Bas Publishing.
- Gerald Johnston's playing statistics from AFL Tables
- Gerald Johnston at AustralianFootball.com
