= Gerald W. Johnson (military officer) =

United States Air Force general

Gerald Walter Johnson
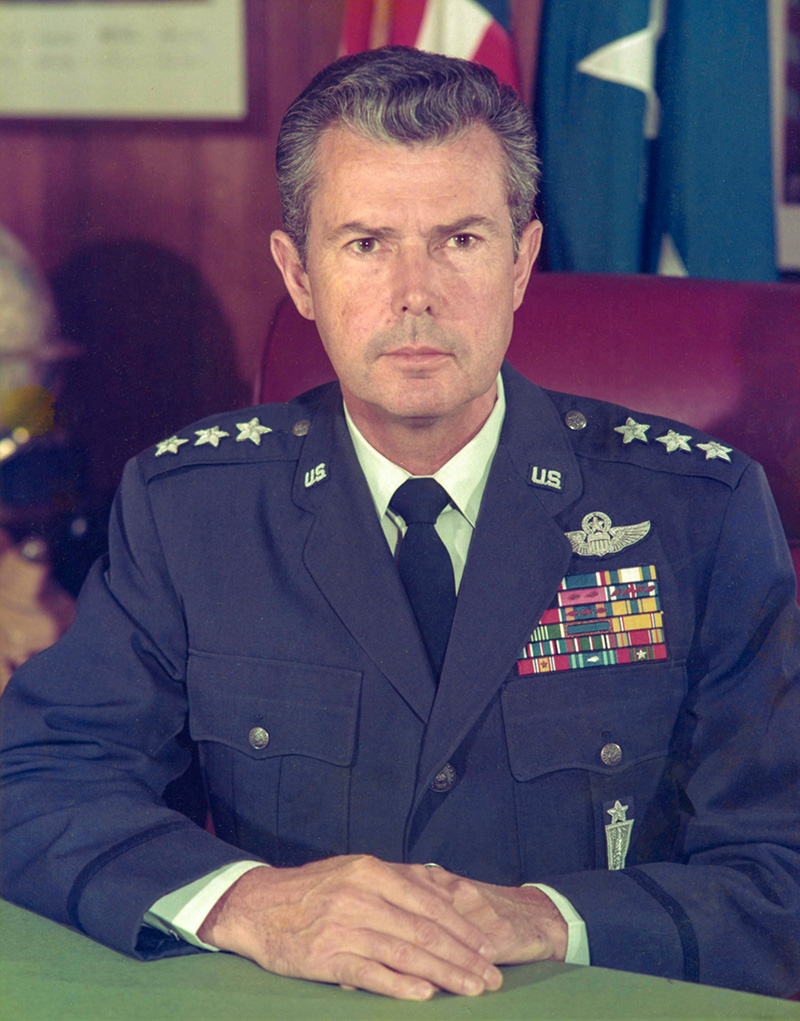
- Born: 10 July 1919; Owenton, Kentucky, U.S.
- Died: 9 September 2002 (aged 83); St. Petersburg, Florida, U.S.
- Burial place: Arlington National Cemetery
- Military career
- Allegiance: United States of America
- Branch: United States Army Air Corps; United States Army Air Forces; United States Air Force
- Service years: 1941–1974
- Rank: Lieutenant General
- Nickname: "Jerry"
- Unit: 56th Fighter Group
- Commands: 63d Fighter Squadron; 508th Strategic Fighter Wing; 4080th Strategic Reconnaissance Wing; 95th Bombardment Wing; 305th Bombardment Wing; 825th Air Division; 1st Strategic Aerospace Division; Eighth Air Force
- Conflicts: World War II; Vietnam War
- Awards: Distinguished Service Cross; Distinguished Service Medal (2); Legion of Merit (3); Distinguished Flying Cross (5); Air Medal (5)

Gerald Walter Johnson (July 10, 1919 – September 9, 2002) was a lieutenant general in the United States Air Force and a World War II flying ace. Enlisting in 1941, Johnson served as a fighter pilot in Europe, and was credited with shooting down 16.5 enemy aircraft before being shot down himself and taken prisoner. After the war, he continued his military career rising to command several fighter and bomber wings during the 1950s and 60s. He commanded the Eighth Air Force for a period during the Vietnam War, and retired in 1974 after serving as Inspector General of the Air Force.

== Early life ==
Johnson was born in Owenton, a small town in northern Kentucky, on 10 July 1919.

He was a graduate of Boston University and did graduate work at George Washington University.

== World War II ==
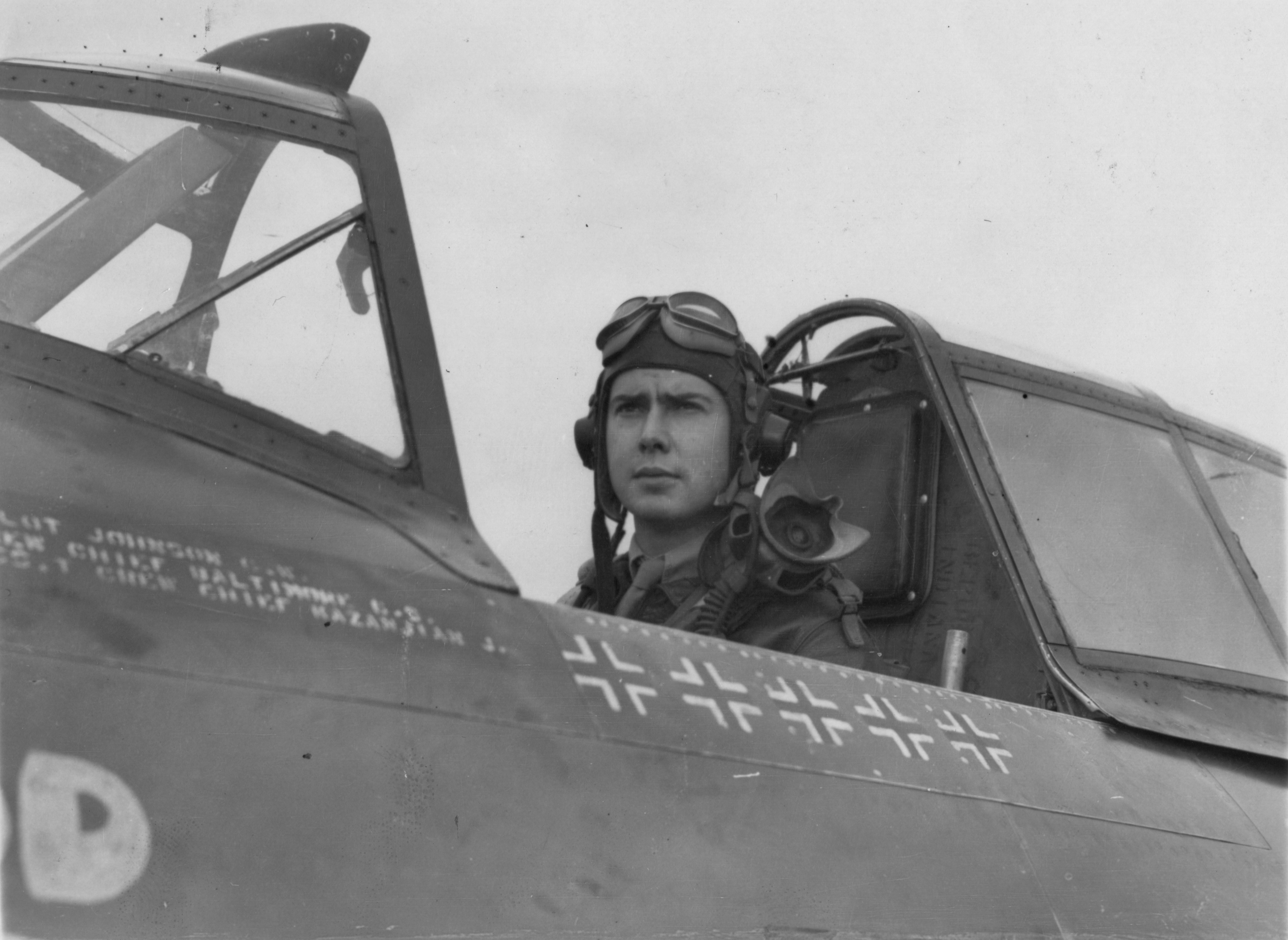
Gerald W Johnson was the first ace pilot of the 56th Fighter Group and the second fighter ace in the European Theater.

In 1941, he entered service with the United States Army Air Corps as an aviation cadet at Randolph Field, Texas. He graduated the following April and was commissioned a second lieutenant. He served with the 56th Fighter Group, flying Republic P-47 Thunderbolts in the European Theater of Operations (ETO). He became the first ace of the 56th and the second American ace in the ETO. In February 1944, he was promoted to Major and took command of the 63d Fighter Squadron. He was credited with 16.5 air-to-air victories. After fifteen months of combat he was shot down on March 27, 1944, and spent 13 months as a prisoner of war at Stalag Luft I when it was liberated by The Red Army on May 2, 1945.

== Strategic Air Command ==
After the war, he was associated with the fighter forces of Strategic Air Command (SAC), becoming the commander of the 508th Strategic Fighter Wing, flying Republic F-84 Thunderjets in 1954. He remained in SAC after its fighters were transferred, becoming commander of the 4080th Strategic Reconnaissance Wing, the first USAF organization to fly the Lockheed U-2, in 1956. Following staff assignments with the 7th Air Division, SAC headquarters and the 12th Strategic Aerospace Division, he returned to command with the 95th Bombardment Wing in 1963.

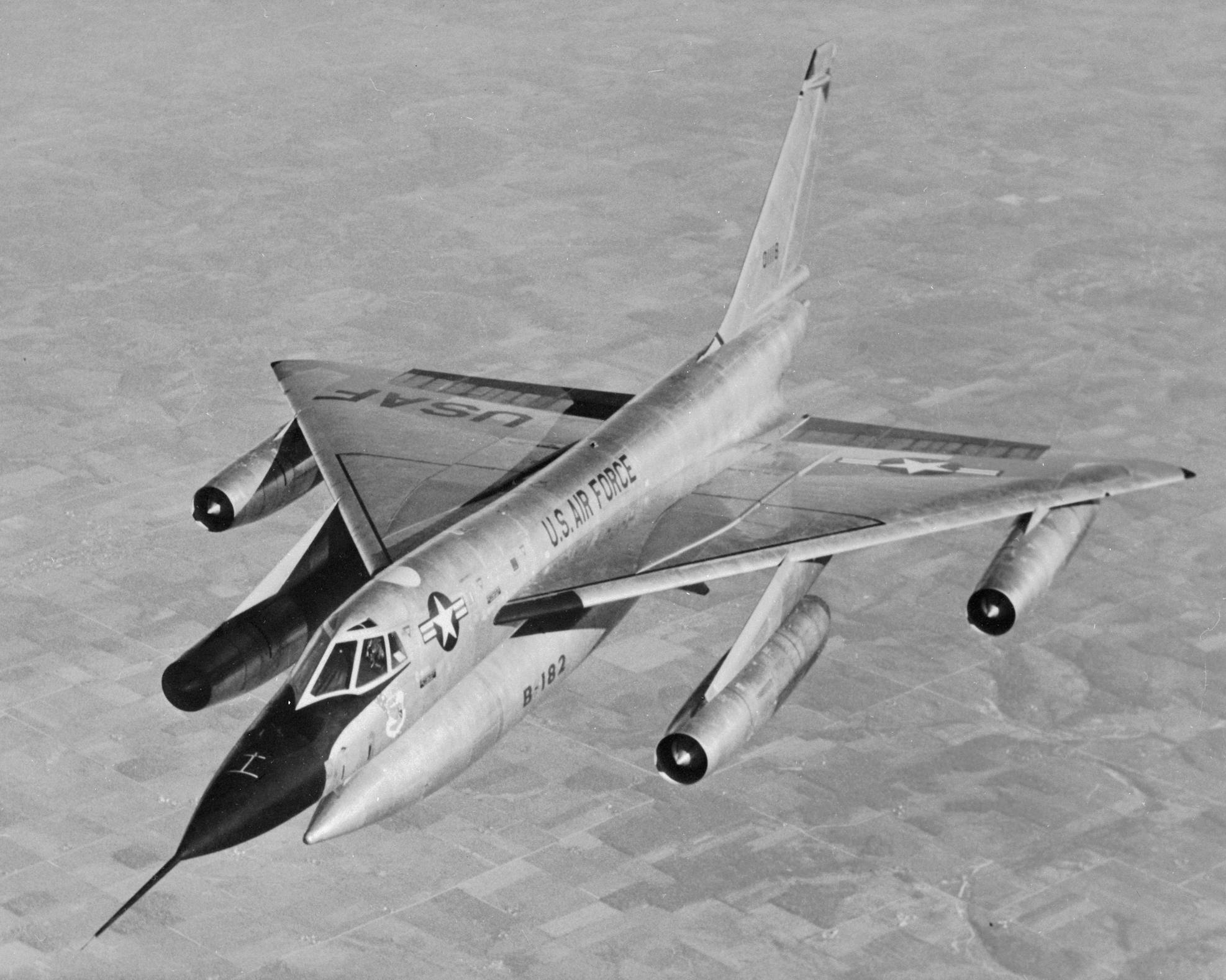
Convair B-58

In 1965, he became the commander of the 305th Bombardment Wing, which set a number of world speed records with the Convair B-58 Hustler during his command. He then commanded the 825th Strategic Aerospace Division. He became vice commander of Second Air Force in 1968 and commander of the 1st Strategic Aerospace Division in 1969.

After another staff tour with SAC headquarters, he became commander of the Eighth Air Force at Andersen Air Force Base, Guam, controlling all SAC bombers and tankers in the Pacific during the Vietnam War. His final assignment was as Inspector General of the Air Force, retiring from that position on September 1, 1974.

== Decorations ==
Distinguished Service Cross
Air Force Distinguished Service Medal with bronze oak leaf cluster
Legion of Merit with two bronze oak leaf clusters
Distinguished Flying Cross with four bronze oak leaf clusters
Bronze Star
Air Medal with four bronze oak leaf clusters
Air Force Commendation Medal
Army Commendation Medal
Air Force Presidential Unit Citation
American Defense Service Medal
American Campaign Medal
European-African-Middle Eastern Campaign Medal
World War II Victory Medal
National Defense Service Medal with one bronze service star
Vietnam Service Medal with four bronze campaign stars

Air Force Longevity Service Award with silver and two bronze oak leaf clusters
Croix de Guerre, with silver star (France)
Republic of Vietnam Gallantry Cross
Vietnam Campaign Medal

=== Distinguished Service Cross citation ===

Johnson, Gerald W.
Captain (Air Corps), U.S. Army Air Forces
61st Fighter Squadron, 56th Fighter Group, 8th Air Force
Date of Action: August 17, 1943
Citation:

The President of the United States of America, authorized by Act of Congress July 9, 1918, takes pleasure in presenting the Distinguished Service Cross to Captain (Air Corps) Gerald Walter Johnson, United States Army Air Forces, for extraordinary heroism in connection with military operations against an armed enemy while serving as Pilot of a P-47 Fighter Airplane in the 61st Fighter Squadron, 56th Fighter Group, Eighth Air Force, in aerial combat against enemy forces on 17 August 1943, in action over continental Europe, 17 August 1943, while serving as a flight leader in a mission escorting withdrawing bombers. Through the aggressiveness, courage, and persistent attacks of the flight led by Captain Johnson, the withdrawal of bombers escorted by his flight was successfully accomplished. Though repeatedly attacked by enemy aircraft, Captain Johnson, through initiative, resourcefulness, and leadership adequately protected his convoy and personally destroyed two enemy aircraft and assisted in the destruction of a third. Captain Johnson, by his repeated acceptance of heavy odds and by his aggressive spirit in the attack, has been an inspiration to his fellow pilots and reflects the highest credit upon himself and the armed forces of the United States.

=== Military ===
- Command and General Staff School
- National War College

=== Aeronautical ratings ===
- Command pilot wings
- Senior Missile Badge

== Bibliography ==
- Freeman, Roger A. (1970). The Mighty Eighth: Units, Men and Machines (A History of the US 8th Army Air Force). London, England, UK: Macdonald and Company. ISBN 978-0-87938-638-2.
- Ravenstein, Charles A. (1984). Air Force Combat Wings, Lineage & Honors Histories 1947–1977. Washington, DC: Office of Air Force History. ISBN 978-0-912799-12-4.
