= 70th Air Refueling Squadron =

US Air Force reserve unit

70th Air Refueling Squadron

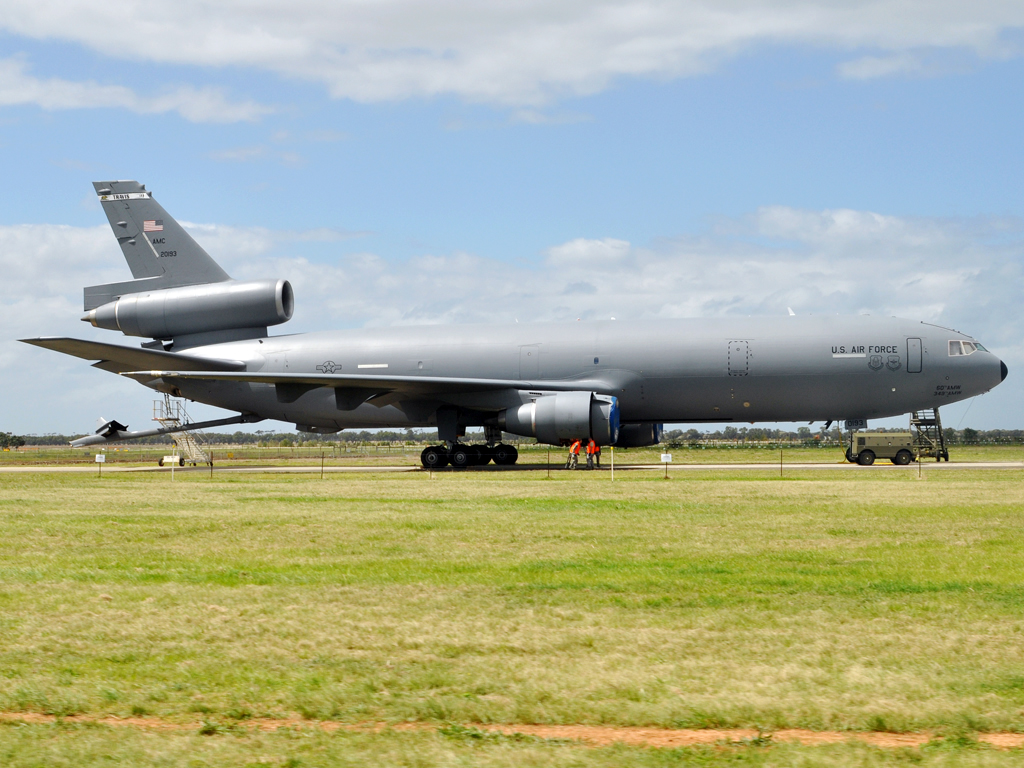
- Squadron KC-10 Extender at Avalon Airport, Australia (Note: Aircraft is McDonnell Douglas KC-10A Extender serial 82-0193, Silver Hawk. Taken at the Avalon 2011 Australian International Airshow.)
- Active: 1942–1944; 1955–1993; 1994-present
- Country: United States
- Branch: United States Air Force
- Role: Aerial refueling
- Part of: Air Force Reserve Command
- Garrison/HQ: Travis Air Force Base
- Motto: Extending Excellence
- Engagements: Desert Storm
- Decorations: Air Force Outstanding Unit Award with Combat "V" Device; Air Force Outstanding Unit Award

Insignia
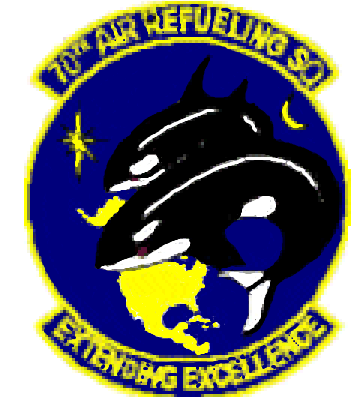
- 70th Air Refueling Squadron emblem (new)

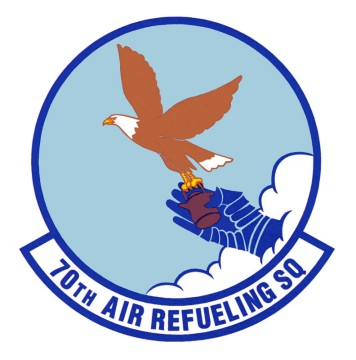
- 70th Air Refueling Squadron emblem (Note: Approved 8 August 1996.)

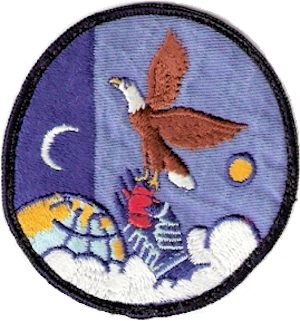
- 70th Air Refueling Squadron emblem (Note: Approved 8 May 1958.)

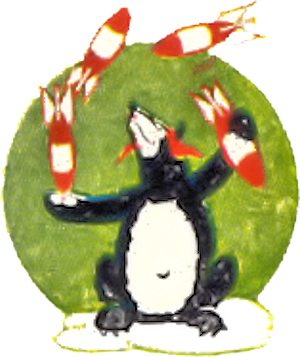
- 470th Bombardment Squadron emblem (Note: Approved 5 February 1943. Description: In front of a light yellow green disc, "Bomby" bear wearing a red aviator's helmet and white goggles, seated affronte on a white cloud formation in base, juggling four orange and white aerial bombs. The emblems of the four squadrons of the 334th Bombardment Group, featuring "Bomby-the-Bear" were featured in the National Geographic Magazine in June 1943. Hubbard, p. 714.)

The 70th Air Refueling Squadron is an Air Force Reserve Command unit, assigned to the 349th Operations Group at Travis Air Force Base, California. It is an associate of the active duty 9th Air Refueling Squadron, United States Air Force, and operates the Boeing KC-46A Pegasus aircraft conducting mobility, and air refueling missions. The squadron previously operated the McDonnell Douglas KC-10 Extender. The squadron has served in this role since 1994.

The squadron was activated as a Boeing KC-97 Stratofreighter unit in August 1955. It provided global air refueling for Strategic Air Command (SAC) with the KC-97, and later with the Boeing KC-135 Stratotanker. After 1970, it also provided airborne command and control support for SAC. It supported contingency operations and deployed aircraft and aircrews for Desert Storm. In 1985, the squadron was consolidated with the 470th Bombardment Squadron, a World War II medium bomber training unit. The squadron was inactivated in 1993, as Grissom Air Force Base, Indiana was transferred to Air Force Reserve Command.

== History ==
=== World War II bomber training ===
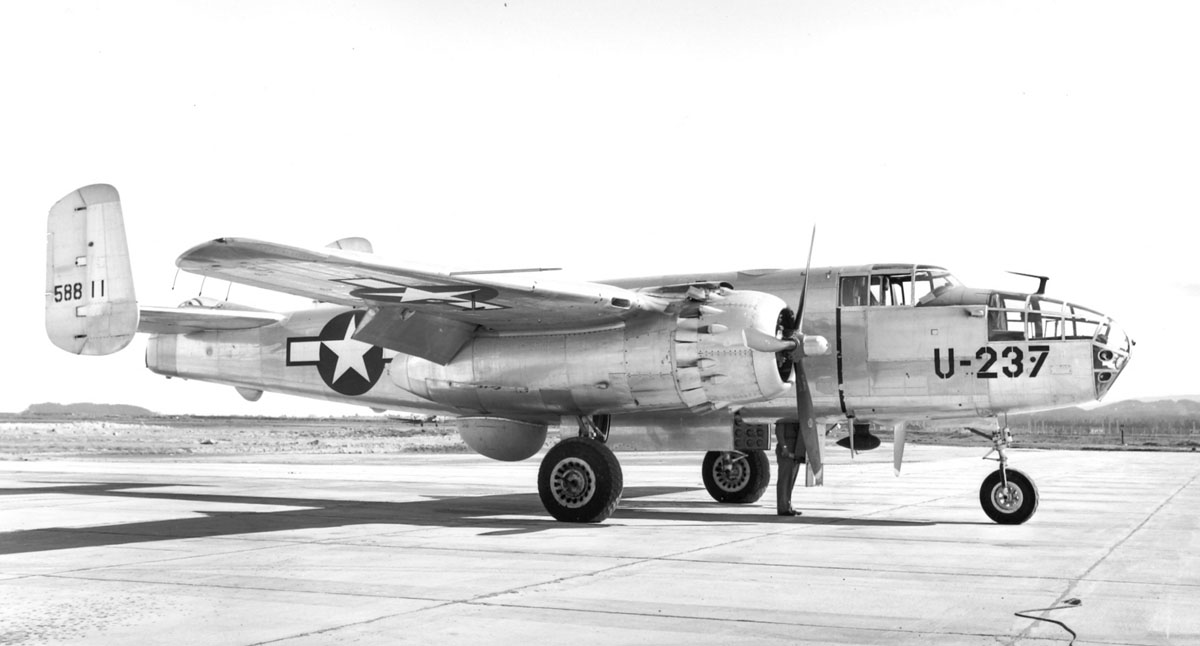
B-25 Mitchell as flown by the squadron during World War II

The squadron's first predecessor, the 470th Bombardment Squadron, was activated on 16 July 1942 at Greenville Army Air Base, South Carolina as one of the original components of the 334th Bombardment Group, and was equipped with North American B-25 Mitchells. The 470th acted as a Replacement Training Unit (RTU) for the B-25. RTUs were oversized units whose mission was to train individual pilots or aircrews.

However, the AAF found that standard military units, whose manning was based on relatively inflexible tables of organization were not well adapted to the training mission, particularly to the replacement training mission. Accordingly, in the spring of 1944, the 334th Group, its components and supporting units at Greenville, were disbanded on 1 May and replaced by the 330th AAF Base Unit (Medium, Bombardment).

=== Air Refueling operations ===
==== Strategic Air Command ====
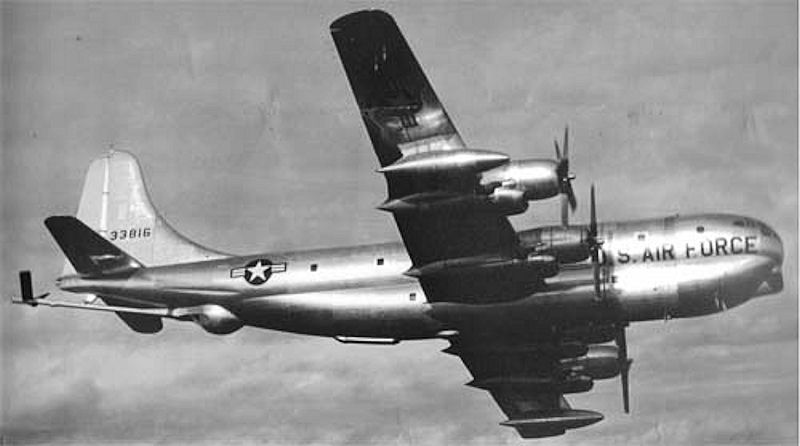
Boeing KC-97G Stratofreighter

The 70th Air Refueling Squadron was activated at Little Rock Air Force Base, Arkansas on 1 August 1955 and assigned to the 70th Strategic Reconnaissance Wing. At the time the squadron was activated, Little Rock was undergoing major construction and the few elements of the 70th Wing that were crewed operated from Lockbourne Air Force Base, Ohio. With the completion of construction, the wing returned to Little Rock in October 1955 and the squadron finally became operational.

The squadron provided air refueling support to the Boeing RB-47 Stratojets of its parent wing and other Strategic Air Command (SAC) units. It deployed as a unit to a forward base at Ernest Harmon Air Force Base, Newfoundland in 1956 and 1957, while the entire 70th Wing deployed to Sidi Slimane Air Base, Morocco from October to December 1956. In February 1958, the 70th Wing began to reduce its reconnaissance missions and in June 1958 began training SAC aircrews in the Stratojet. The 70th Squadron, however continued its deployments with the KC-97, conducting deployments to Lajes Field, Azores through 1962. In August 1961, the squadron transferred to the 384th Bombardment Wing, which was also stationed at Little Rock, and continued to operate under that wing until the 384th inactivated on 1 September 1964 as B-47 operations at Little Rock came to an end, although it ended KC-97 operations in 1963.

In response to the Cuban Missile Crisis, on 29 October 1962, SAC directed movement of its KC-97 force to forward locations to support its B-47s that had been placed on first cycle alert in the Eastern United States. This required deployment of 87 KC-97s, carrying with them all required supporting personnel, to Harmon, Lajes, and Goose Bay Airport, Labrador. The dispersed aircraft were to be ready to launch within an hour. The dispersed planes began to return to their home bases on 15 November, and all were home by 24 November.

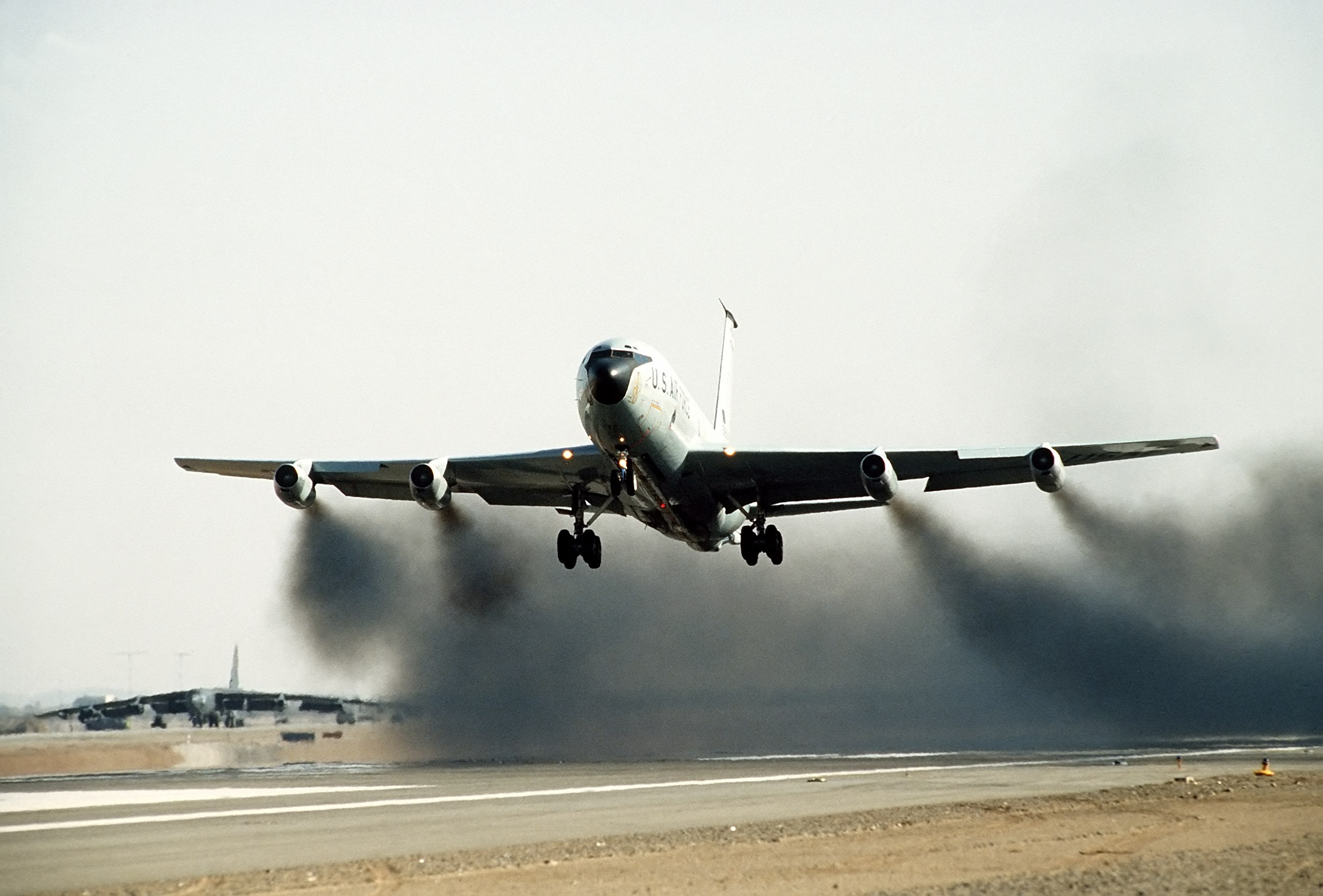
Boeing KC-135 takeoff

In 1964, the squadron began to equip with the Boeing KC-135 Stratotanker. It was attached to the 43d Bombardment Wing, which was equipped with the supersonic Convair B-58 Hustler, on 19 August and assigned to the 43d once the wing moved to Little Rock on 1 September 1964. In 1969, the 43d Wing began to draw down with the removal of the B-58 from the inventory and the forthcoming transfer of Little Rock to Tactical Air Command as a base for the Lockheed C-130 Hercules.

The phase out of the B-58 resulted in the 305th Bombardment Wing at Grissom Air Force Base, Indiana becoming an air refueling wing, and the 70th moved to Grissom on 1 January 1970 to become the wing's third refueling squadron. Shortly afterwards, SAC decided to move the Boeing EC-135 aircraft supporting its alternate airborne command posts from their vulnerable locations near the coastlines of the United States and established the 3rd Airborne Command and Control Squadron at Grissom to operate this element of the Post Attack Command and Control System (PACCS). While the primary airborne command post at Offutt Air Force Base, Nebraska was airborne, these aircraft remained on ground alert. In 1975, the 3rd was inactivated and its PACCS functions at Grissom were absorbed by the 70th, (Note: Robertson indicates the squadron began flying command and control missions in 1970). which maintained them until inactivating in 1993. In 1983, the squadron supported Operation Urgent Fury, providing refueling to the transports, gunships, and fighters operating in Grenada. In September 1985, the squadron was consolidated with the 470th Bombardment Squadron.

In 1990, the squadron deployed aircrews and aircraft to Europe and the Arabian peninsula during the Gulf War. These deployments lasted into 1991. After Air Mobility Command assumed responsibility for air refueling operations in 1992, it began to realign its tanker force. As a result of this realignment, Grissom was transferred to Air Force Reserve Command, and the 70th was inactivated on 1 April 1993.

==== Reserve associate unit ====
On 1 September 1994, the squadron was reactivated in the reserve at Travis Air Force Base, California as part of the 349th Air Mobility Wing. The squadron did not have its own aircraft, but flew the McDonnell Douglas KC-10 Extenders of the active duty 9th Air Refueling Squadron as a reserve associate unit. After the September 11 attacks, the squadron supported U.S. sorties during the War in Afghanistan (2001–2021) and the homeland defense Operation Noble Eagle. It also deployed to support the 2003 invasion of Iraq and the Iraq War. The squadron also supported the Hurricane Katrina relief effort in September 2005.

== Lineage ==
470th Bombardment Squadron

- Constituted as the 470th Bombardment Squadron (Medium) on 9 July 1942

Activated on 16 July 1942
Disbanded on 1 May 1944

- Reconstituted on 19 September 1985 and consolidated with the 70th Air Refueling Squadron as the 70th Air Refueling Squadron

70th Air Refueling Squadron
Constituted as the 70th Air Refueling Squadron, Medium on 3 June 1955
Activated on 1 August 1955
Redesignated 70th Air Refueling Squadron, Heavy on 1 November 1963

- Consolidated with the 470th Bombardment Squadron on 19 September 1985

Redesignated 70th Air Refueling Squadron on 1 September 1991
Inactivated on 1 April 1993

- Activated in the reserve on 1 September 1994

=== Assignments ===
- 334th Bombardment Group, 16 July 1942 – 1 May 1944
- 70th Strategic Reconnaissance Wing, 1 August 1955
- 384th Bombardment Wing, 1 August 1961 (attached to 43d Bombardment Wing after 19 August 1964)
- 43d Bombardment Wing, 1 September 1964
- 305th Air Refueling Wing, 1 January 1970
- 305th Operations Group, 1 September 1991 – 1 April 1993
- 349th Operations Group, 1 September 1994 – present

=== Stations ===
- Greenville Army Air Base, South Carolina, 16 July 1942 – 1 May 1944
- Little Rock Air Force Base, Arkansas, 1 August 1955 (deployed to Ernest Harmon Air Force Base, Newfoundland 26 June – 15 August 1945, 24 June – 24 September 1957; Lajes Field (later Lajes Air Base), Azores, Portugal, 3 September 1958 – 12 January 1959, 5 October 1960 – 11 January 1961, 31 July – 28 September 1962)
- Grissom Air Force Base, Indiana, 1 January 1970 – 1 April 1993
- Travis Air Force Base, California, 1 September 1994 – present

=== Aircraft ===
- North American B-25 Mitchell (1942–1944)
- Boeing KC-97 Stratofreighter (1955–1963)
- Boeing KC-135 Stratotanker (1964–1969, 1970–1993)
- Boeing EC-135 (1976–1993)
- McDonnell Douglas KC-10 Extender (1994 – 2024)
- Boeing KC-46 Pegasus (2024 – Present)

=== Awards and campaigns ===
Award streamer	Award	Dates	Notes
	Air Force Outstanding Unit Award with Combat "V" Device	1 August 2002-15 August 2003	70th Air Refueling Squadron
	Air Force Outstanding Unit Award	15 February-30 December 1957	70th Air Refueling Squadron
	Air Force Outstanding Unit Award	1 July 1972-30 June 1973	70th Air Refueling Squadron
	Air Force Outstanding Unit Award	1 July 1973-30 June 1974	70th Air Refueling Squadron
	Air Force Outstanding Unit Award	1 July 1975-30 June 1977	70th Air Refueling Squadron
	Air Force Outstanding Unit Award	1 July 1979-30 June 1980	70th Air Refueling Squadron
	Air Force Outstanding Unit Award	1 June 1990-31 May 1992	70th Air Refueling Squadron
	Air Force Outstanding Unit Award	[1 September] 1994-15 August 1995	70th Air Refueling Squadron
	Air Force Outstanding Unit Award	1 July 1996-30 June 1998	70th Air Refueling Squadron
	Air Force Outstanding Unit Award	1 August 2000-31 July 2002	70th Air Refueling Squadron
	Air Force Outstanding Unit Award	16 August 2003-17 August 2004	70th Air Refueling Squadron
	Air Force Outstanding Unit Award	18 August 2004-17 August 2005	70th Air Refueling Squadron
	Air Force Outstanding Unit Award	18 August 2005-17 August 2006	70th Air Refueling Squadron
	Air Force Outstanding Unit Award	18 August 2006-17 August 2007	70th Air Refueling Squadron
	Air Force Outstanding Unit Award	16 August 2007-17 August 2008	70th Air Refueling Squadron
	Air Force Outstanding Unit Award	18 August 2008-17 August 2009	70th Air Refueling Squadron
	Air Force Outstanding Unit Award	30 September 2009-30 September 2011	70th Air Refueling Squadron
	Air Force Outstanding Unit Award	1 October 2011-30 September 2013	70th Air Refueling Squadron
	Air Force Outstanding Unit Award	1 October 2013-31 December 2014	70th Air Refueling Squadron

Campaign Streamer	Campaign	Dates	Notes
	American Theater without inscription	15 July 1942–1 April 1944	470th Bombardment Squadron
	Defense of Saudi Arabia	2 August 1990–16 January 1991	70th Air Refueling Squadron
	Liberation and Defense of Kuwait	17 January 1991–11 April 1991	70th Air Refueling Squadron (Note: Although both Haulman and Robertson state that the squadron participated in Operation Urgent Fury, neither Robertson not Musser indicate the squadron was awarded an expeditionary streamer for this operation. Haulman p. 141, Robertson, AFHRA Factsheet (2011), Musser, AFHRA Factsheet (2022).)
