= List of United States Air Force air refueling squadrons =

This is a list of United States Air Force air refueling squadrons.

== Air refueling squadrons ==
Squadron	Shield	Location	Nickname	Aircraft	Status
2nd Air Refueling Squadron		McGuire AFB	"Second to None"	KC-46 Pegasus	Active
6th Air Refueling Squadron		Travis AFB, Fairfield CA	Strength Extended	KC-46 Pegasus	Active
7th Air Refueling Squadron		Carswell AFB, Ft. Worth TX		KC-135A	Inactivated 1993
9th Air Refueling Squadron		Travis AFB, Fairfield CA	"Universal"	KC-46 Pegasus	Active
11th Air Refueling Squadron		Altus AFB, Altus OK		KC-135R	Inactivated 1994
18th Air Refueling Squadron		McConnell AFB, Wichita KS	"Kanza"	KC-135 Stratotanker	AFRC
19th Air Refueling Squadron		Otis AFB, Cape Cod MA		KC-97	Inactivated 1965
22d Expeditionary Air Refueling Squadron		Incirlik Air Base, Turkey	"Mules"	KC-135R	Active
26th Air Refueling Squadron		Plattsburgh AFB, NY		KC-97	Inactivated 1964
27th Air Refueling Squadron		Bergstrom AFB		KB-29	Inactivated 1957
28th Air Refueling Squadron		Ellsworth AFB		KC-135A/R	Inactivated 1994
32d Air Refueling Squadron		McGuire AFB	"Linking the Continents"	KC-10 Extender	Active
34th Air Refueling Squadron		Pease AFB		KC-135A	Inactivated 1991 redesignated the 34th Strategic Squadron
40th Air Refueling Squadron		Schilling AFB		KC-97	Inactivated
41st Air Refueling Squadron		Griffiss AFB		KC-135A/R	Inactivated 1993
42d Air Refueling Squadron		Loring AFB		KC-135A/R	Inactivated 1994
43d Expeditionary Air Refueling Squadron		Fairchild AFB	"First Global"	KC-135A/R	Inactivated 1995
44th Expeditionary Air Refueling Squadron		Selfridge AFB		KC-97	Inactivated 1964
46th Air Refueling Squadron		K.I. Sawyer AFB		KC-135A	Inactivated 1993
54th Air Refueling Squadron		Altus AFB		KC-135 Stratotanker	Active
55th Air Refueling Squadron		Altus AFB	"Masters of the Art"	KC-135 Stratotanker	Inactivated 2009
56th Air Refueling Squadron		Altus AFB		KC-46 Pegasus	Active
63d Air Refueling Squadron		MacDill AFB		KC-135 Stratotanker	AFRC
64th Air Refueling Squadron		Pease ANGB		KC-135R Stratotanker KC-46A Pegasus	New Hampshire ANG
68th Air Refueling Squadron		Bunker Hill AFB		KC-135A	Inactivated 1965
70th Air Refueling Squadron		Travis AFB		KC-46 Pegasus	AFRC
71st Air Refueling Squadron		Barksdale AFB		KC-135A/Q	Inactivated 1994
72d Air Refueling Squadron		Grissom JARB		KC-135 Stratotanker	AFRC
74th Air Refueling Squadron		Grissom JARB		KC-135 Stratotanker	AFRC
76th Air Refueling Squadron		McGuire AFB	"Freedom's Spirit"	KC-10 Extender	AFRC
77th Air Refueling Squadron		Seymour Johnson AFB	"Totin' Tigers"	KC-135 Stratotanker	AFRC
78th Air Refueling Squadron		McGuire AFB		KC-10 Extender	AFRC
79th Air Refueling Squadron		Travis AFB		KC-46 Pegasus	AFRC
90th Expeditionary Air Refueling Squadron		undisclosed location		KC-135 Stratotanker	Active
91st Air Refueling Squadron		MacDill AFB		KC-135 Stratotanker	Active
92d Air Refueling Squadron		Fairchild AFB	"Black Hawk"	KC-135 Stratotanker	Active
93d Air Refueling Squadron		Fairchild AFB	"Domini Artis" (Masters of the Art)	KC-135A/R Stratotanker	Active
96th Air Refueling Squadron		Hickam AFB		KC-135 Stratotanker	Inactivated 2015
97th Air Refueling Squadron		Fairchild AFB	"Ad Astra"	KC-135R Stratotanker	Active
98th Air Refueling Squadron		Fairchild AFB		KC-135R	Inactivated 1998
99th Air Refueling Squadron		Birmingham Airport Alabama		KC-135 Stratotanker	Active
100th Air Refueling Squadron		Pease AFB		KC-97	Inactivated 1965
102d Air Refueling Squadron		NAS New York / Floyd Bennett Field	"ANG’s Oldest Unit"	KC-97L	Redesignated 102d Rescue Squadron in 1992
106th Air Refueling Squadron		Birmingham Airport	"Rebels"	KC-135R Stratotanker	Alabama ANG
108th Air Refueling Squadron		Scott AFB	"Mid America Militia"	KC-135R Stratotanker	Illinois ANG
116th Air Refueling Squadron		Fairchild AFB	"Ace of Spades"	KC-135 Stratotanker	Washington ANG
117th Air Refueling Squadron		Forbes AFB	"Kansas Coyotes"	KC-135R Stratotanker	Kansas ANG
126th Air Refueling Squadron		Mitchell international airport		KC-135R Stratotanker	Wisconsin ANG
132d Air Refueling Squadron		Bangor IAP	"Maine-iacs"	KC-135A/E/R	Maine ANG
133d Air Refueling Squadron		Pease AFB	"Live Free or Die"	KC-135A/E/R KC-46A Pegasus	New Hampshire ANG
136th Air Refueling Squadron		Niagara Falls International Airport		KC-135	Redesignated 136th Airlift Squadron in 2008 and 136th Attack Squadron in 2015
141st Air Refueling Squadron		McGuire AFB	"Tigers"	KC-46A	New Jersey ANG
145th Air Refueling Squadron		Rickenbacker ANGB	"Tazz"	KC-135R Stratotanker	Inactivated 2014
146th Air Refueling Squadron		Pittsburgh International Airport		KC-135R Stratotanker	Pennsylvania ANG
147th Air Refueling Squadron		Pittsburgh International Airport		KC-135R Stratotanker	Pennsylvania ANG
150th Air Refueling Squadron		McGuire AFB	"Bet on Us"	KC-135R Stratotanker	New Jersey ANG
151st Air Refueling Squadron		McGhee Tyson ANGB, TN	"Volunteers"	KC-135R Stratotanker	Tennessee ANG
153d Air Refueling Squadron		Key Field ANGB	"Magnolia Militia"	KC-135R Stratotanker	Mississippi ANG
154th Air Refueling Squadron		Little Rock Air Force Base		KC-135	Redesignated 154th Tactical Airlift Training Squadron 1986
166th Air Refueling Squadron		Rickenbacker ANGB	"Eddie"	KC-135R Stratotanker	Ohio ANG
168th Air Refueling Squadron		Eielson AFB		KC-135R Stratotanker	Alaska ANG
170th Air Refueling Squadron		McGuire AFB		KC-46A	New Jersey ANG
171st Air Refueling Squadron		Selfridge Field	Six Pack	KC-135 Stratotanker	Michigan ANG
173d Air Refueling Squadron		Lincoln ANGB	"Hustlin' Huskers"	KC-135 Stratotanker	Nebraska ANG
180th Air Refueling Squadron		Rosecrans Memorial Airport Missouri ANG		KC-97	Redesignated 180th Airlift Squadron
181st Air Refueling Squadron		NAS Dallas / Hensley Field Texas ANG		KC-97	Redesignated 181st Airlift Squadron
191st Air Refueling Squadron		Salt Lake City Air National Guard Base	"Ruddy Ducks"	KC-135	Utah ANG
196th Air Refueling Squadron		March Air Reserve Base	"Grizzlies"	KC-135	Redesignated 196th Reconnaissance Squadron 2006
197th Air Refueling Squadron		Sky Harbor IAP	"Copperheads"	KC-135R Stratotanker	Arizona ANG
203d Air Refueling Squadron		Hickam AFB		KC-135 Stratotanker	Hawaii ANG
301st Air Refueling Squadron		Rickenbacker Air Force Base		KC-135	Inactivated 1975
303d Air Refueling Squadron		Kindley AB		KC-97	Inactivated 1963
305th Air Refueling Squadron		Grissom AFB		KC-97 KC-135A/R	Inactivated 1994
306th Air Refueling Squadron		Altus AFB	"First Round the World	KC-135Q	Inactivated 1994
307th Air Refueling Squadron		K.I. Sawyer AFB		KC-135A	Inactivated 1994
308th Air Refueling Squadron		Hunter AFB		KC-97	Inactivated 1960
310th Air Refueling Squadron		Plattsburgh AFB		KC-135A/Q/R/T	Inactivated 1992
314th Air Refueling Squadron		Beale AFB	"War Hawks"	KC-135 Stratotanker	AFRC
320th Air Refueling Squadron		March AFB		KC-97	Inactivated 1964
321st Air Refueling Squadron		Rickenbacker Air Force Base		KC-135	Inactivated 1965
328th Air Refueling Squadron		Niagara Falls Air Reserve Station		KC-135 Stratotanker	AFRC
336th Air Refueling Squadron		March ARB	"R.R.A.T.S."	KC-135 Stratotanker	AFRC
340th Expeditionary Air Refueling Squadron		Al Udeid Air Base, Qatar		KC-135 Stratotanker	Active
341st Air Refueling Squadron		Dow AFB		KC-97	Inactivated 1963
344th Air Refueling Squadron		McConnell AFB	"Ravens"	KC-46A Pegasus	Active
349th Air Refueling Squadron		McConnell AFB	"Blue Knights"	KC-135 Stratotanker	Active
350th Air Refueling Squadron		McConnell AFB	"Red Falcons"	KC-135 Stratotanker	Active
351st Air Refueling Squadron		RAF Mildenhall	"Box D"	KC-135 Stratotanker	Active
376th Air Refueling Squadron		Barksdale AFB		KC-97	Inactivated 1957
380th Air Refueling Squadron		Plattsburgh AFB		KC-135A/Q/R/T	Inactivated 1994
384th Air Refueling Squadron		Fairchild AFB	"Square Patchers"	KC-135 Stratotanker	Active
407th Air Refueling Squadron		Loring AFB		KC-135A	Inactivated 1990
420th Air Refueling Squadron		RAF Sculthorpe, England		KB-29M KB-50J	Inactivated 1964
421st Air Refueling Squadron		Yokota AB, Japan		KB-29M KB-50J	Inactivated 1965
427th Air Refueling Squadron		Langley AFB		KB-50J/K	Inactivated 1963
429th Air Refueling Squadron		Langley AFB		KB-50J/K	Inactivated 1963
431st Air Refueling Squadron		Biggs AFB		KB-50J/K	Inactivated 1963
465th Air Refueling Squadron		Tinker AFB	"Okies"	KC-135 Stratotanker	AFRC
506th Air Refueling Squadron		Dow AFB		KB-29	Inactivated 1955
508th Air Refueling Squadron		Turner AFB		KB-29	Inactivated 1956
509th Air Refueling Squadron		Pease AFB		KC-135A/R	Redesignated 509th Weapons Squadron
622d Air Refueling Squadron		England AFB		KB-50J/K	Inactivated 1965
709th Air Refueling Squadron		March AFB		KC-10A	Inactivated 1995
711th Air Refueling Squadron		Seymour Johnson AFB		KC-10A	Inactivated 1994
712th Air Refueling Squadron		Morón AB			Inactivated 1994
744th Air Refueling Squadron		Seymour Johnson AFB		KC-10A	Inactivated 1995
756th Air Refueling Squadron		Andrews AFB		KC-135 Stratotanker	AFRC
900th Air Refueling Squadron		Pease AFB		KC-135A	Inactivated 1966
901st Air Refueling Squadron		Columbus AFB		KC-135A	Inactivated 1969
902d Air Refueling Squadron		Clinton-Sherman AFB		KC-135A	Inactivated 1969
903d Air Refueling Squadron		Beale AFB		KC-135A/Q	Inactivated 1976
904th Air Refueling Squadron		Mather AFB		KC-135A	Inactivated 1986
905th Air Refueling Squadron		Grand Forks AFB	"Rhinos"	KC-135 Stratotanker	Inactivated
906th Air Refueling Squadron		Scott AFB		KC-135R Stratotanker	Active
907th Air Refueling Squadron		Glasgow AFB		KC-135A Stratotanker	Inactivated 1968
908th Expeditionary Air Refueling Squadron		Al Dhafra AB		KC-135R/T/KC-10A	Active
909th Air Refueling Squadron		Kadena AB	"Shoguns"	KC-135 Stratotanker	Active
910th Air Refueling Squadron		Bergstrom AFB		KC-135A	Inactivated 1971
911th Air Refueling Squadron		Seymour Johnson AFB	"Red Eagles"	KC-135 Stratotanker	Active
912th Air Refueling Squadron		Grand Forks AFB	"Vipers"	KC-135 Stratotanker	Active
913th Air Refueling Squadron		Barksdale AFB		KC-135A	Inactivated 1981
914th Air Refueling Squadron		Blythville AFB		KC-135A	Inactivated 1964
915th Air Refueling Squadron		Ramey AFB		KC-135A	Inactivated 1971
916th Air Refueling Squadron		Travis AFB		KC-135A	Inactivated 1983
917th Air Refueling Squadron		Dyess AFB		KC-135A/Q	Inactivated 1994
918th Air Refueling Squadron		Altus AFB		KC-135A	Inactivated 1960
919th Air Refueling Squadron		McCoy AFB		KC-135A/Q	Inactivated 1971
920th Air Refueling Squadron		Wurtsmith AFB		KC-135A	Inactivated 1992
921st Air Refueling Squadron		Altus AFB		KC-135A	Inactivated 1960
922d Air Refueling Squadron		Wright-Patterson AFB		KC-135A	Inactivated 1975
923d Air Refueling Squadron		Altus AFB		KC-135A	Inactivated 1960
924th Air Refueling Squadron		Castle AFB		KC-46 Pegasus	AFRC
928th Air Refueling Squadron		Ellsworth AFB		KC-135A	Inactivated 1960
4101st Air Refueling Squadron (Provisional)		Takhli RTAFB		KC-135A	Inactivated 1973
4102d Air Refueling Squadron (Provisional)		Clark AB / Ching Chuan Kang AB		KC-135A	Inactivated 1973
4103d Air Refueling Squadron (Provisional)		Don Maung IAP		KC-135A	Inactivated 1972
4104th Air Refueling Squadron (Provisional)		Korat RTAFB		KC-135A	Inactivated 1972
4220th Air Refueling Squadron (Provisional)		Ching Chuan Kang AB		KC-135A	Inactivated 1971

== See also ==
- List of United States Air Force squadrons
