= 26th Air Refueling Squadron =

Former US Air Force unit

26th Air Refueling Squadron (later 26th Expeditionary Air Refueling Flight)
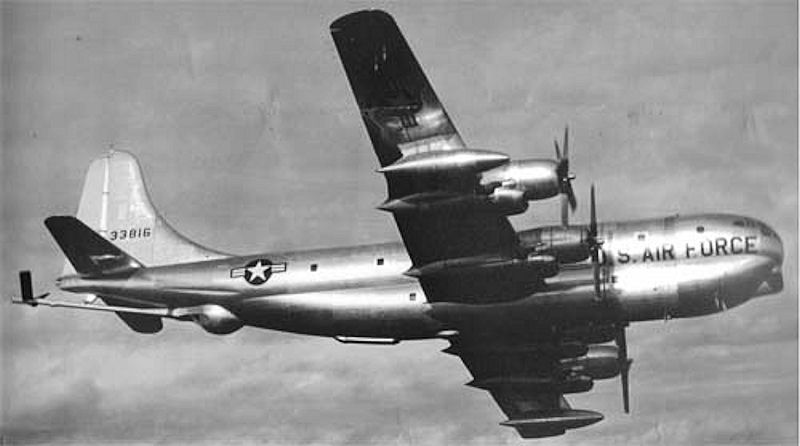
- Boeing KC-97G Stratofreighter as flown by the squadron
- Active: 1952–1955; 1955–1957; 1957–1964
- Country: United States
- Branch: United States Air Force
- Role: Aerial refueling
- Decorations: Air Force Outstanding Unit Award

Insignia
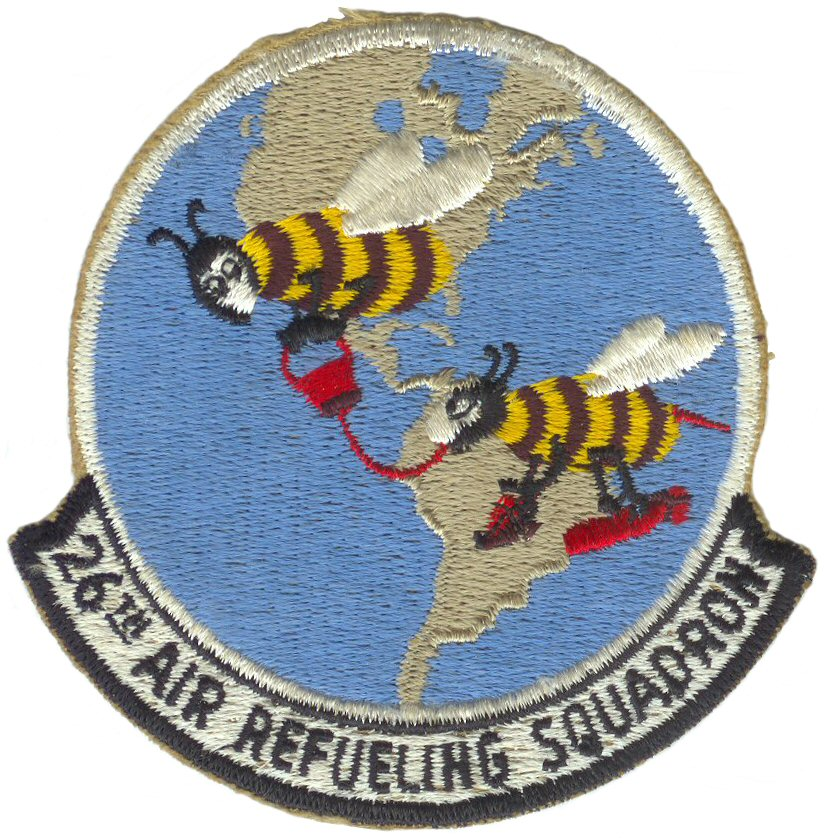
- Emblem of the 26th Air Refueling Squadron

The 26th Air Refueling Squadron is an inactive squadron of the United States Air Force that flew the Boeing KC-97 Stratofreighter, An early Cold War air refueling squadron, it primarily supported Boeing B-47 Stratojets of the Strategic Air Command (SAC) Eighth Air Force during the 1950s and early 1960s. The squadron was inactivated in September 1964 as part of the phaseout of the KC-97 from SAC.

== History ==
The 26th Air Refueling Squadron was formed at Lockbourne Air Force Base Ohio in May 1952. Equipped with the new Boeing KC-97 Stratofreighter, it was assigned as the air refueling component of the 26th Strategic Reconnaissance Wing, primarily supporting the wing's Boeing RB-47 Stratojets. It provided air refueling support for a variety of Strategic Air Command (SAC) directed exercises and operations that included numerous simulated combat missions and deployments, ranging from a few days to a few months. The exercises took the squadron's aircraft to such bases as Eielson Air Force Base, Alaska; Thule Air Base, Greenland; RAF Upper Heyford and RAF Fairford, United Kingdom; Sidi Slimane Air Base in Morocco; Goose Bay Airport, Laborador; and Lajes Field in the Azores.

In August 1953, the squadron refueled Republic F-84G Thunderjet fighters from the 508th Strategic Fighter Wing participating in the Operation Long Stride. They refueled seventeen F-84Gs from Turner Air Force Base, Georgia to RAF Lakenheath, Great Britain during a non-stop 4,485-mile trip. During the second phase of Operation Long Stride in October 1953, the 26th helped refuel eight F-84s of the 31st Strategic Fighter Wing from Turner to Nouasseur Air Base, French Morocco. The aircraft covered 3,800 miles in 10 hours and 20 minutes, thanks to in-flight refueling in the vicinity of Bermuda and the Azores. Crews and aircraft from the 26th deployed to Lajes in September 1954 for 45 days to refuel the 26th Wing's reconnaissance aircraft.

In April 1955, the squadron was reassigned to the new 4050th Air Refueling Wing under the 57th Air Division at Westover Air Force Base, Massachusetts. From Westover, the squadron carried out air refueling primary for Eighth Air Force B-47s transiting the Atlantic from either the United States or returning from SAC's Operation Reflex bases in Europe and North Africa. On 22 May 1957, the 26th moved from Westover to Plattsburgh Air Force Base, New York, being reassigned to the 380th Bombardment Wing under the 820th Air Division.

From its base at Plattsburgh, the squadron continued to support training in air refueling for B-47 and B-52 crews as well as deploying to bases in Newfoundland and Greenland. Aircraft and crews were at Sondrestrom Air Base, Greenland, when President John F. Kennedy was assassinated, to guard against any potential "sucker punch" that the USSR might try while our country grieved. The squadron was inactivated in September 1964 as part of the retirement of the KC-97 from SAC service.

== Lineage ==
- Constituted as the 26th Air Refueling Squadron on 9 May 1952

Activated on 28 May 1952
Inactivated on 15 September 1964

- Redesignated 26th Expeditionary Air Refueling Flight, converted to provisional status and assigned to Air Mobility Command to activate or inactivate as needed on 29 September 2004

=== Assignments ===
- 26th Strategic Reconnaissance Wing, 28 May 1952
- 4050th Air Refueling Wing, 1 April 1955
- 820th Air Division, 7 August 1957 (attached to 380th Bombardment Wing)
- 380th Bombardment Wing, 1 August 1959
- 4108th Air Refueling Wing, 1 January 1961
- 497th Air Refueling Wing, 1 January 1963 – 15 September 1964

=== Stations ===
- Lockbourne Air Force Base, Ohio, 28 May 1952
- Westover Air Force Base, Massachusetts, 1 April 1955
- Plattsburgh Air Force Base, New York, 7 Aug 1957 – 15 September 1964

=== Aircraft ===
- Boeing KC-97E Stratofreighter (1952–1957)
- Boeing KC-97F Stratofreighter (1953–1961)
- Boeing KC-97G Stratofreighter (1954–1964)

== See also ==
- List of United States Air Force air refueling squadrons
