= 320th Air Refueling Squadron =

Inactive US Air Force unit

320th Refueling Squadron
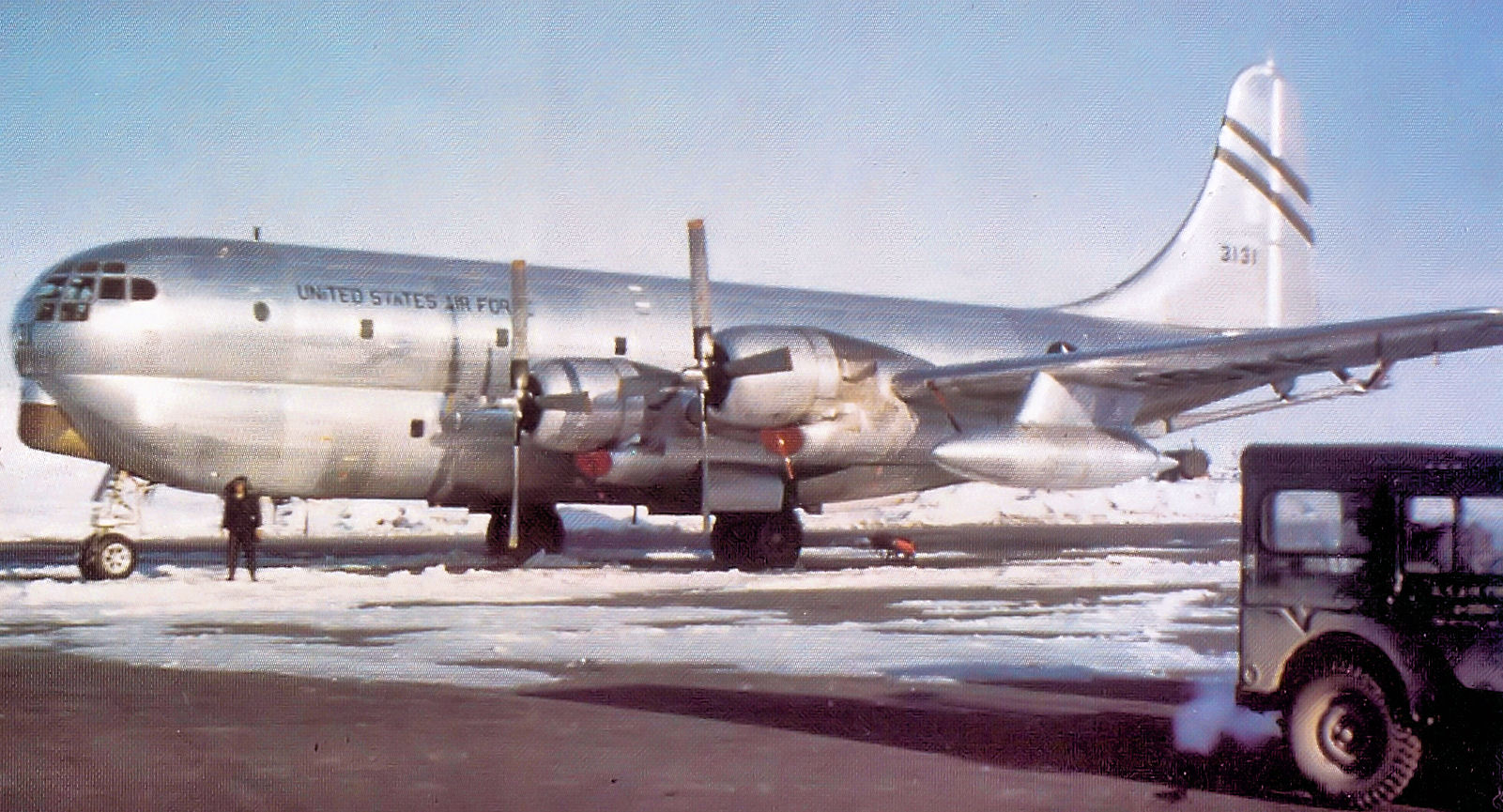
- 320th Air Refueling Squadron Boeing KC-97G Stratotanker 53–131 at Thule AB, Greenland, 1953.
- Active: 1943–1945; 1952–1962
- Country: United States
- Branch: United States Air Force
- Role: Aerial refueling
- Engagements: European theater of World War II
- Decorations: Air Force Outstanding Unit Award

Insignia
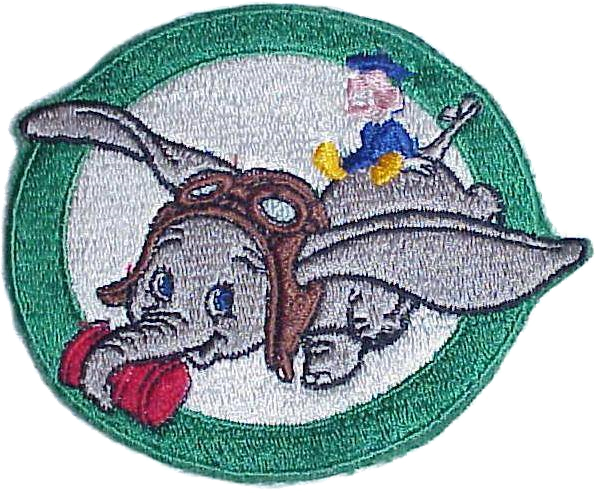
- Patch showing 320th Refueling Squadron Emblem

The 320th Air Refueling Squadron is an inactive United States Air Force unit. It was last assigned to the 22d Bombardment Wing at March AFB, California, where it was inactivated on 15 September 1962.

The squadron had its roots during World War II, when the 320th Transport Squadron (Cargo & Mail) was activated as an airlift support unit for VIII Air Force Service Command in England. The squadron moved to the continent in the fall of 1944 and became an element of the 302d Transport Wing, supporting combat and occupation forces until it was inactivated in the fall of 1945.

The 320th Air Refueling Squadron was activated in the fall of 1952 to replace the inactivating 106th Air Refueling Squadron at March AFB. It continued to provide refueling support throughout the Boeing B-47 Stratojet and the early Boeing B-52 Stratofortress era at March. It was inactivated when Strategic Air Command dispersed its B-52s to make it more difficult for the Soviet Union to knock out the entire fleet with a surprise first strike. This reduced the need for tankers at March to a single squadron, the 22d Air Refueling Squadron, and the 320th was inactivated.

The squadrons were consolidated in 1985, but have not been active since consolidation.

== History ==
=== World War II ===
The squadron had its roots during World War II, when the 321st Transport Squadron was one of five squadrons activated in November 1943 and assigned to the 27th Air Transport Group. The 321st was an airlift support unit for VIII Air Force Service Command in England. It initially provided air transport and logistics support within the British Isles. The squadron moved to France in the fall of 1944 and became an element of the 302d Transport Wing, supporting combat and occupation forces until it was inactivated in the fall of 1945.

=== Cold War ===
The 320th Air Refueling Squadron had its origins when the 106th Air Refueling Squadron (Note: This squadron is not related to the 106th Air Refueling Squadron of the Alabama Air National Guard.) was activated by Strategic Air Command (SAC) in 1952 at March Air Force Base, California. The 106th was constituted on 18 June and activated on 8 July to serve as the air refueling element of the 106th Bombardment Wing. The 106th wing was a light bomber unit of the New York Air National Guard that had been called to active duty because of the Korean War, but had been converted to a Boeing B-29 Superfortress wing and filled out by SAC with regular units. (Note: Despite being numbered in the 101–300 series of numbers assigned to Air National Guard units, the 106th was a regular Air Force squadron.) The squadron was short-lived, for on 1 December the 106th wing and its 102d and 114th Bombardment Squadrons were relieved from active duty and replaced by the 320th Bombardment Wing. The remaining operational units of the 106th wing, including the 106th Air Refueling Squadron, were inactivated.

The 320th Air Refueling Squadron assumed the mission, personnel, and Boeing KC-97 Stratofreighter aircraft of the 106th. The following year the 320th Wing converted from B-29s to Boeing B-47 Stratojets. The squadron conducted multiple deployments from 1954 to 1958, including wing deployments to RAF Brize Norton in 1954 and to Anderson Air Force Base in 1956–1957. In addition to wing deployments, the squadron deployed to forward locations like Thule Air Base, Greenland and Elmendorf and Eielson Air Force Bases, Alaska. In 1958 the squadron won the Frank Ellis Trophy as the best air refueling squadron in Fifteenth Air Force and also earned an Air Force Outstanding Unit Award.

In June 1960 the 320th Bombardment Wing inactivated and the squadron was transferred to the 22d Bombardment Wing at March. By 1962 the 22d was preparing to transition from B-47s to Boeing B-52 Stratofortress aircraft. This eliminated the need for two refueling squadrons at March and the 320th was inactivated on 15 September 1962.

The 320th Transport Squadron and the 320th Air Refueling Squadron were consolidated in 1985 but have not been active since then.

== Lineage ==
320th Transport Squadron

- Constituted ca. 26 October 1943 as the 320th Transport Squadron (Cargo & Mail)

Activated on 1 November 1943
Inactivated ca. 8 November 1945

- Disbanded 8 October 1948
- Reconstituted on 19 September 1985 and consolidated with the 320th Air Refueling Squadron as the 320th Air Refueling Squadron

320th Air Refueling Squadron

- Constituted on 1 December 1952 as the 320th Air Refueling Squadron, Medium and activated

Inactivated on 15 September 1962

- Consolidated on 19 September 1985 with the 320th Transport Squadron as the 320th Air Refueling Squadron, Heavy (remained inactive)

=== Assignments ===
- 27th Air Transport Group: 1 November 1943
- 302d Transport Wing: 1 July 1945 – c. 8 November 1945
- 320th Bombardment Wing: 1 December 1952 (detached 2 May 1955 – 15 June 1955, 1 October 1955 – ca. 25 October 1955, 3 March 1956 – 7 May 1956, 5 October 1956 – 11 January 1957, 3 January 1958 – 10 April 1958)
- 22nd Bombardment Wing: 16 June 1960 – 15 September 1962

=== Stations ===
- RAF Grove, England, 1 November 1943
- Le Bourget Airport, France, September 1944
- Chartres Airfield, France, November 1944
- Villacoublay Airfield, France, ca. March 1945 – ca. 8 November 1945
- March Air Force Base, California 1 December 1952 – 15 September 1962

=== Aircraft ===
- C-47, 1943–1945
- KC-97, 1952–1963

=== Awards and campaigns ===
Award streamer	Award	Dates	Notes
	Air Force Outstanding Unit Award	1 January 1958-15 January 1959	320th Air Refueling Squadron

Campaign Streamer	Campaign	Dates	Notes
	Service in EAME only	1 November 1943 – 21 May 1945	320th Transport Squadron
