= 11th Air Refueling Squadron =

US Air Force unit

- Active: 1942–1944; 1955–1994
- Country: United States
- Branch: United States Air Force
- Role: Aerial refueling
- Decorations: Air Force Outstanding Unit Award

Insignia
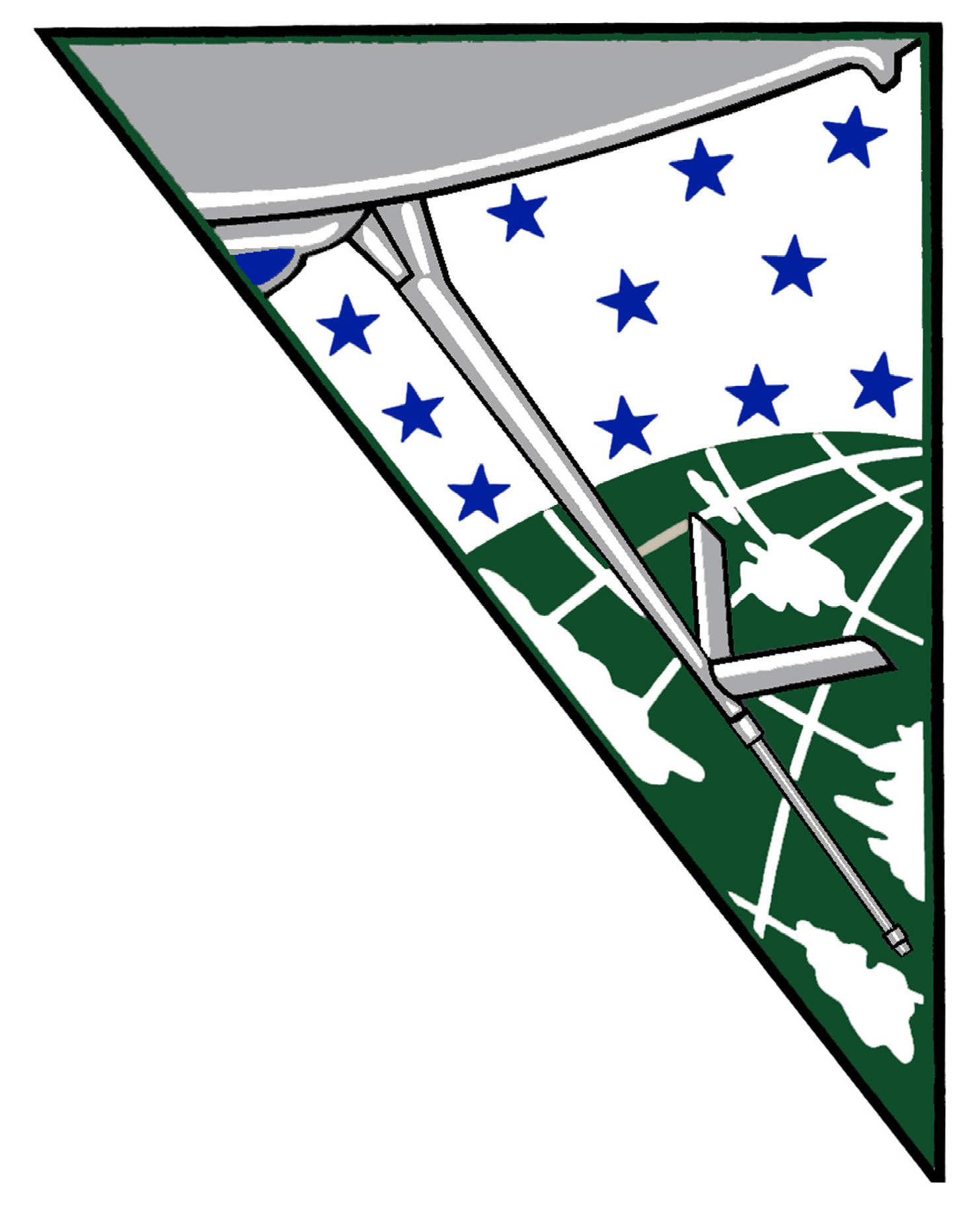
- 11th Air Refueling Squadron emblem

The 11th Air Refueling Squadron is an inactive United States Air Force unit. It was last assigned to the 340th Air Refueling Wing, stationed at Altus Air Force Base, Oklahoma. It was inactivated on 1 October 1994.

== History ==
During World War II the squadron trained crews and technicians for photographic reconnaissance and mapping, 1942–1944.

Activated in 1955 under Strategic Air Command (SAC) as a Boeing KC-97 Stratofreighter air refueling squadron, it participated in SAC tests, exercises, and air refueling operations and other Air Force commands in North America, Europe, and the Pacific Far East, and Southeast Asia, from 1955 onward. It won numerous wards for its operational performance, including the Saunders Trophy for Outstanding Air Refueling Unit in 1970 and 1971.

It was upgraded in 1965 to the Boeing KC-135 Stratotanker jet. In 1972 the 11th supported two large-scale aircraft movements to Southeast Asia, 5–6 and 8–9 April, and on 12 May and over the next three days it deployed all available tankers and crews at Takhli Royal Thai Air Force Base, Thailand. About one-half of squadron personnel formed a rear echelon at Altus AFB. The forward echelon manned the 4101st Air Refueling Squadron, Provisional. Some 11th ARS personnel were returning to Altus AFB on 4 November 1972, but some of the squadron remained on temporary duty in SEA. By January 1973 about half of the 11th's KC-135s had returned and by June 1973 all aircraft and crews had returned. The 11th continued its normal SEA support as well as its many other global commitments. The squadron refueled its first Lockheed C-5 Galaxy on 1 May 1974.

The squadron's resources were divided on 1 July 1977, a part being retained by the 11th, the remainder used to man the new 340th Air Refueling Group, Heavy, and the 340th Consolidated Aircraft Maintenance Squadron. The new group was assigned to the 19th Air Division and the 11th to the group.

On 19 September 1985 the 11th Air Refueling Squadron was consolidated with the 11th Combat Mapping Squadron, a unit that was last active 1 May 1944. This action was directed by Department of the Air Force Letter DAF/MPM 662q Attachment 1 (Active Units), 19 September 1985. The Consolidated Unit will retain the Designation of 11th Air Refueling Squadron, Heavy.

The squadron was inactivated in 1994 as part of the drawdown of the USAF after the end of the Cold War.

== Lineage ==
11th Combat Mapping Squadron

- Constituted as the 5th Mapping Squadron on 1 May 1942

Activated on 7 May 1942
Redesignated the 11th Photographic Mapping Squadron on 9 June 1942
Redesignated the 11th Photographic Squadron (Heavy) on 6 February 1943
Redesignated the 11th Combat Mapping Squadron on 11 August 1943
Disbanded on 1 May 1944

- Reconstituted, and constituted with the 11th Air Refueling Squadron on 19 September 1985

11th Air Refueling Squadron
Constituted as the 11th Air Refueling Squadron, on 10 August 1955
Activated on 1 December 1955
Redesignated 11th Air Refueling Squadron, Medium on 15 September 1958
Redesignated 11th Air Refueling Squadron, Heavy on 25 June 1965
Redesignated 11th Air Refueling Squadron on 1 September 1991
Inactivated on 1 October 1994

=== Assignments ===
- 2d Photographic (later Photographic and Mapping; Photographic Reconnaissance) Group, 7 May 1942 – 1 May 1944
- 11th Bombardment Wing, 10 August 1955
- 341st Bombardment Wing, 1 December 1955
- 4050th Air Refueling Wing, 1 June 1960
- 499th Air Refueling Wing, 1 January 1963
- 820th Strategic Aerospace Division, 1 July 1964
- 11th Strategic Aerospace Wing (later 11th Air Refueling Wing), 25 June 1965
- 19th Air Division, 25 March 1969
- 17th Strategic Aerospace Division, 2 July 1969
- 47th Air Division, 31 March 1970
- 19th Air Division, 30 June 1971
- 340th Air Refueling Group (later Wing), 1 July 1977
- 340th Operations Group, 1 September 1991
- 97th Operations Group, 1 October 1992
- 457th Operations Group, 1 July 1993 – 1 October 1994

=== Stations ===
- Bradley Field, Connecticut, 7 May 1942
- Colorado Springs Army Air Base, Colorado, 13 May 1942
- Will Rogers Field, Oklahoma, 14 October 1943 – 1 May 1944
- Abilene Air Force Base (later Dyess Air Force Base, Texas, 10 August 1955 – 1 June 1960
- Dover Air Force Base, Delaware, 1 June 1960 – 25 June 1965
- Altus Air Force Base, Oklahoma, 25 June 1965 – 1 October 1994

=== Aircraft ===
- Primarily B-17/F-9 Flying Fortress and B-24/F-7 Liberator, 1942–1943
- KC-97 Stratofreighter, 1956–1965
- KC-135 Stratotanker, 1965–1994

=== Decorations ===
- Air Force Outstanding Unit Award
  - 1 Jul 1980 – 30 June 1982
  - 1 Jul 1971 – 30 June 1973
  - 1 Jan 1963 – 31 December 1974
  - 1 Sep 1956 – 11 April 1957
