= Boeing KC-97 Stratofreighter =

1951–1978 American strategic tanker aircraft

KC-97 Stratofreighter
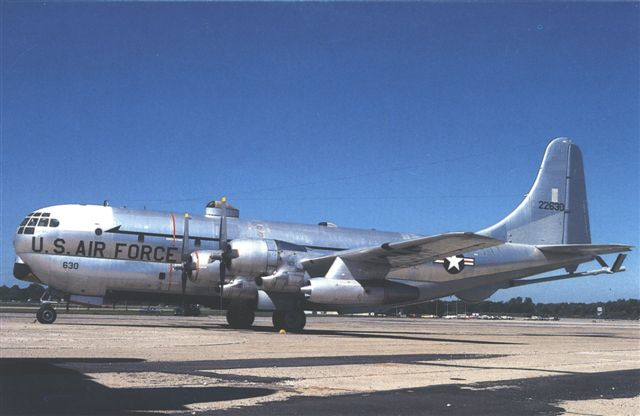
- KC-97L in Ohio Air National Guard markings

General information
- Type: Strategic tanker
- Manufacturer: Boeing
- Primary users: United States Air Force Spanish Air Force
- Number built: 811

History
- Manufactured: 1951–1956
- Introduction date: 14 July 1951
- Retired: June 1978
- Developed from: Boeing C-97 Stratofreighter

The Boeing KC-97 Stratofreighter is a four-engined, piston-powered United States strategic tanker aircraft based on the Boeing C-97 Stratofreighter. It replaced the KB-29 and was succeeded by the Boeing KC-135 Stratotanker.

== Design and development ==
The KC-97 Stratofreighter was an aerial refueling tanker variant of the C-97 Stratofreighter (which was itself based on the Boeing B-29 Superfortress), greatly modified with all the necessary tanks, plumbing, and a flying boom first developed for the KB-29 bomber. The cavernous upper deck was capable of accommodating oversize cargo accessed through a very large right-side door. Transferable jet fuel was contained in tanks on the lower deck (G-L models).

Both decks were heated and pressurized for high altitude operations. The boom operator lay prone, viewing operations through a window at the bottom of the tail, a configuration later used on the KC-135.

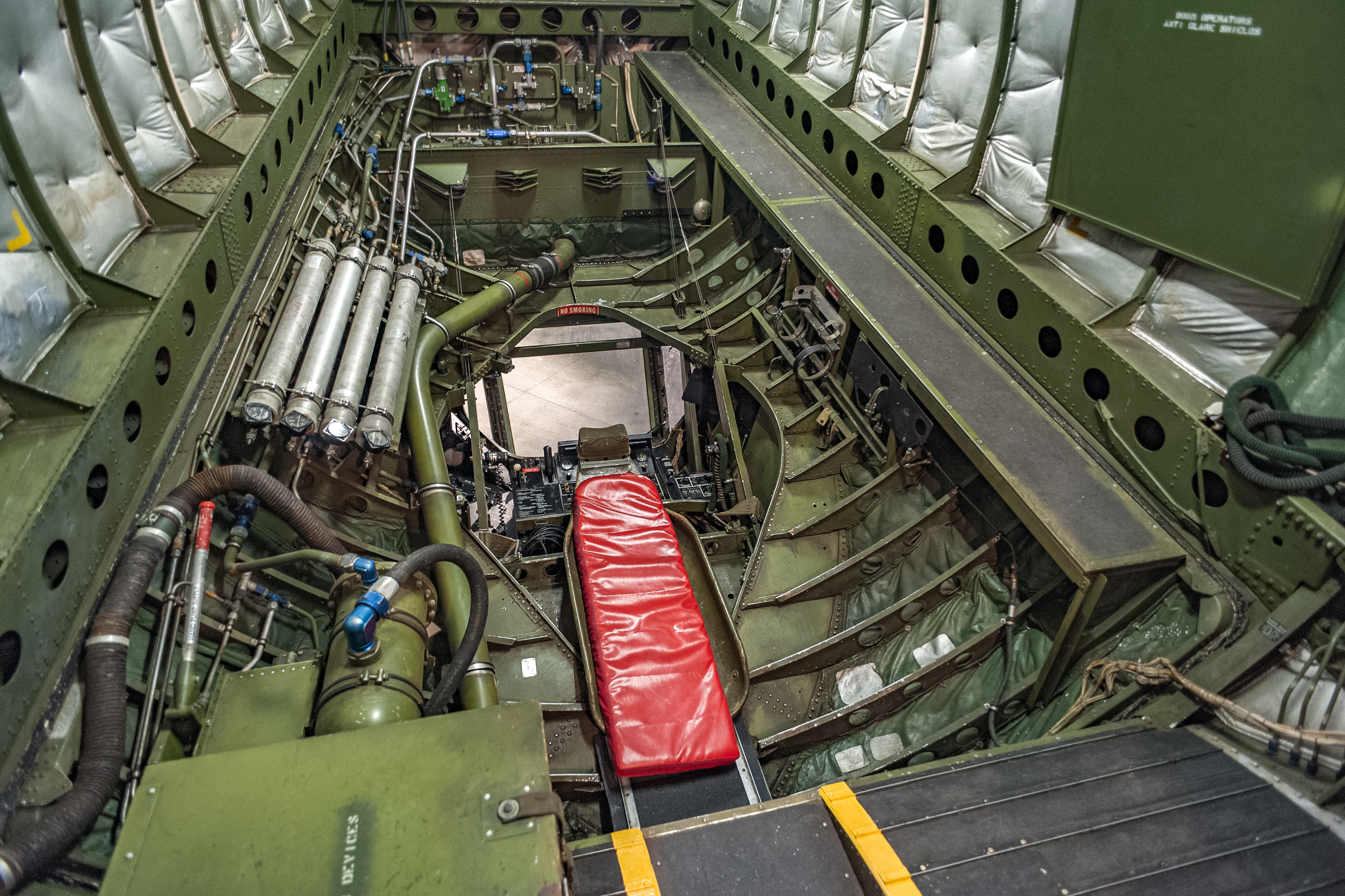
A Boeing KC-97 Stratofreighter's refueling boom operator's station from the National Museum of the US Air Force

Note: Occasionally the KC-97 has been referred to as "Stratotanker". However, all reputable sources refer to the KC-97 as Stratofreighter, not -tanker. This includes both Boeing and the USAF themselves.

== Operational history ==
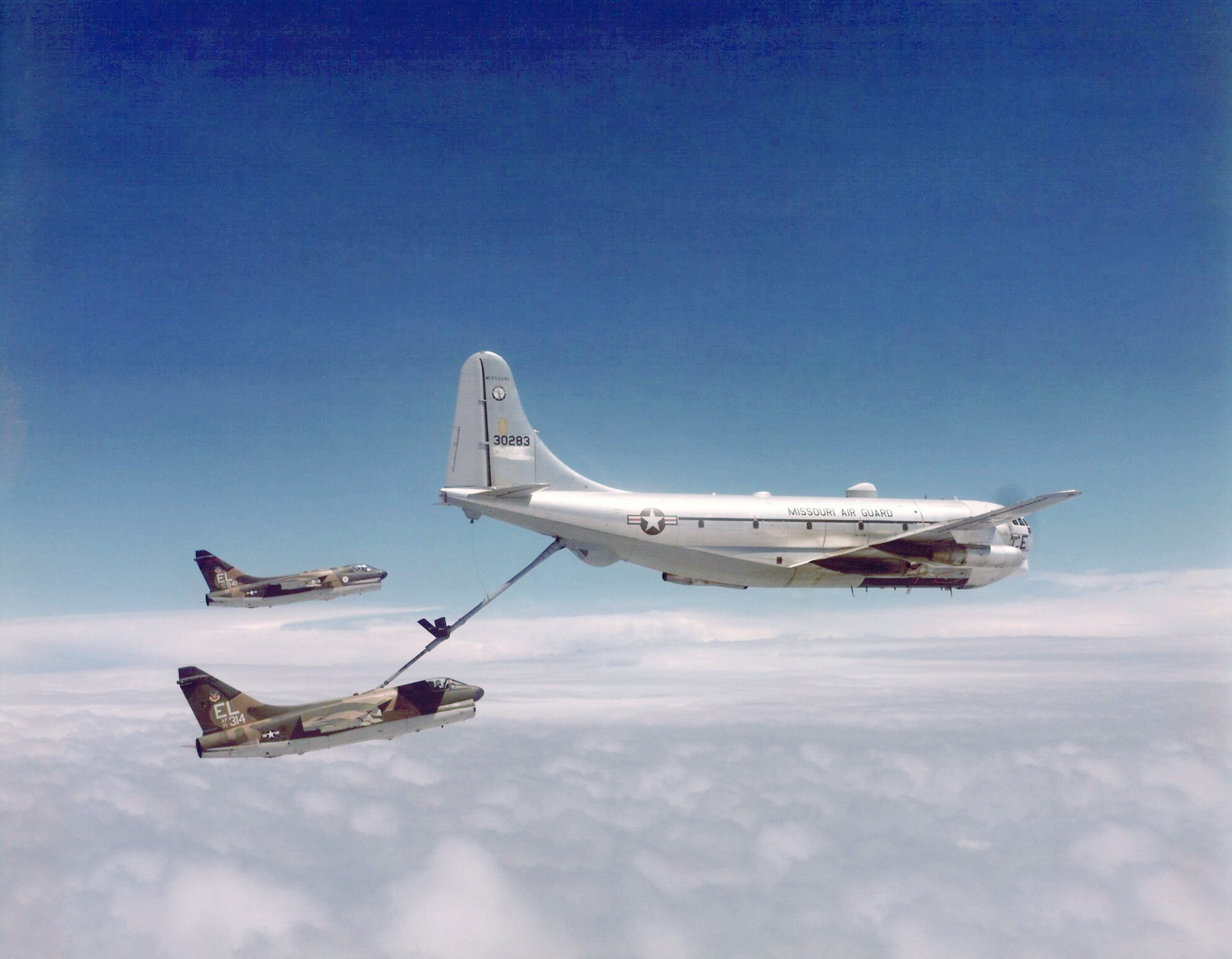
Two USAF A-7 Corsair IIs refueling from a KC-97.

The USAF began operating the KC-97 in 1950. It received 811 KC-97s from Boeing, and 74 of the C-97 cargo version, while ordering 819 KC-97s and 74 C-97s. The KC-97 carried aviation gasoline for its own piston engines and carried jet fuel for its refueling mission. This required an independent system for each type of fuel. In an emergency, it was able to offload its aviation gas to a receiver in a procedure universally known as a "save".

These tankers were vitally important to the world-wide Boeing B-47 Stratojet strategic operations. An example was the support of Arctic reconnaissance flights from Thule Air Base.

During Operation Creek Party, which started in 1967 and lasted for 10 years, Air National Guard and Air Force Reserve tankers supported active duty USAF and NATO units in Europe, including an 160th Air Refueling Group Ohio Air National Guard KC-97L.

While it was an effective tanker, the KC-97's slow speed and low operational altitude complicated refueling operations with jet aircraft. B-52s typically lowered their flaps and rear landing gear to slow the aircraft enough to refuel from the KC-97. A typical B-52 refueling engagement profile would involve a descent that allowed the aircraft pair to maintain a higher airspeed (220–240 knots).

In the early 1960s, the Tactical Air Command added General Electric J47 two twin- jet pods from retired KB-50 aerial tankers, to produce the KC-97L. These jet pods increased the speed of the KC-97 for short periods of time, and made it more compatible with jet fighter planes like the F-84, F-100, and F-101.

In 1956, the Strategic Air Command began phasing out its KC-97s in favor of the KC-135 Stratotanker. KC-97s continued flying with Tactical Air Command, the Air Force Reserve, and the Air National Guard. The rest of the KC-97s were retired completely in 1978, when the Texas Air National Guard and the Utah Air National Guard exchanged their KC-97Ls for the C-130 Hercules and the KC-135 Stratotanker, respectively.

One KC-97 airframe (AF Ser. No. 52-0828) was adapted into the Aero Spacelines Super Guppy, a transport plane designed to carry Apollo Program rocket stages from California to Florida. The aircraft carried the Saturn S-IVB stage, which served as the second stage of the Saturn IB, the third stage of the Saturn V, and the fourth stage for the never-built Nova rocket.

This modified KC-97, constructed in 1953, was purchased by NASA in 1997. It is still in service supporting NASA, other Federal agencies, and Federal contractors. It is one of two KC-97s left still in flyable condition, the other being former KC-97G 52-2718, "Angel of Deliverance", flown by Berlin Airlift Historical Foundation as YC-97A 45-59595.

== Variants ==
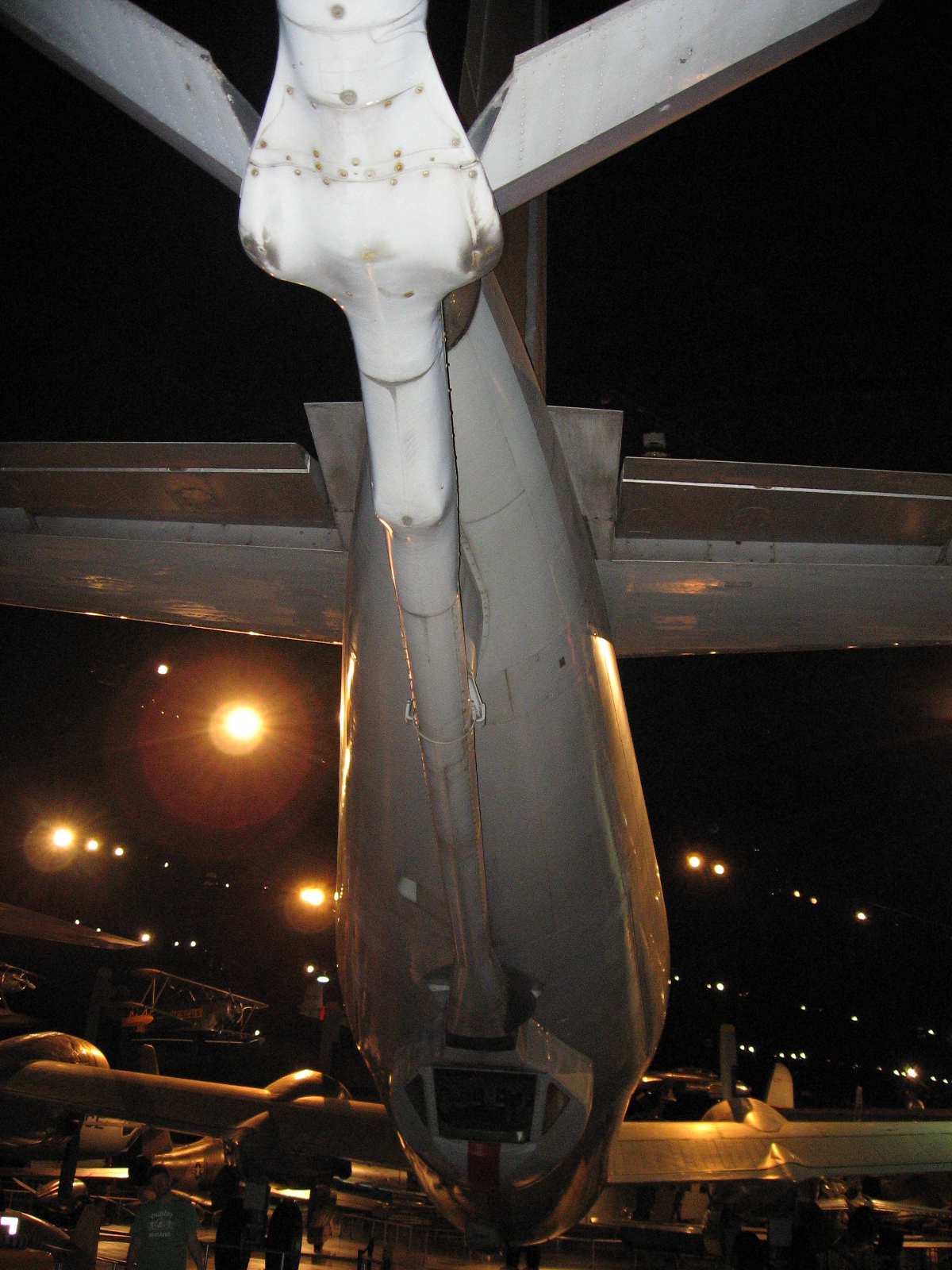
The KC-97's refueling boom

KC-97A
Three C-97As were converted into aerial refueling tankers with rear loading door removed and a flight refueling boom added. After the design was proven, they were converted back into the standard C-97A.
KC-97E
Company designation Model 367-4-29. Aerial refueling tankers with rear loading doors permanently closed, 60 built. Some were later converted into transports as the C-97E.
KC-97F
Company designation Model 367-76-29. 3800 hp R-4360-59B engines and minor changes, 159 built. Some were later converted into transport as the C-97F.
KC-97G
Company designation Model 367-76-66. Dual-role aerial refueling tankers/cargo transportation aircraft. KC-97G models carried underwing fuel tanks. 592 built.
EC-97G
ELINT conversion of three KC-97Gs. 53-106 was operated by the Central Intelligence Agency for covert ELINT operations in the West Berlin Air Corridor.
C-97G
135 KC-97Gs converted to transports.
GKC-97G
Five KC-97Gs were used as ground instruction airframes.
JKC-97G
One aircraft was modified to test the underwing General Electric J47-GE-23 jet engines, and was later designated KC-97L.
HC-97G
KC-97Gs converted for search and rescue operations, 22 converted.
KC-97H
One KC-97F was experimentally converted into a hose-and-drogue refueling aircraft.
YC-97J
Company designation Model 367-86-542. Two KC-97G conversion with four 4250 kW Pratt & Whitney YT34-P-5 turboprops, dropped in favour of the Boeing KC-135 Stratotanker.
C-97K
27 KC-97Gs converted to troop transports.
KC-97L
81 KC-97Gs modified with two J47 turbojet engines on underwing pylons.

The codenames "Eager Beaver" and "Rivet Box" were used for Big Safari-built photoreconnaissance modifications to the C-97G for the 7405th Support Squadron along the Berlin air corridors.

== Operators ==
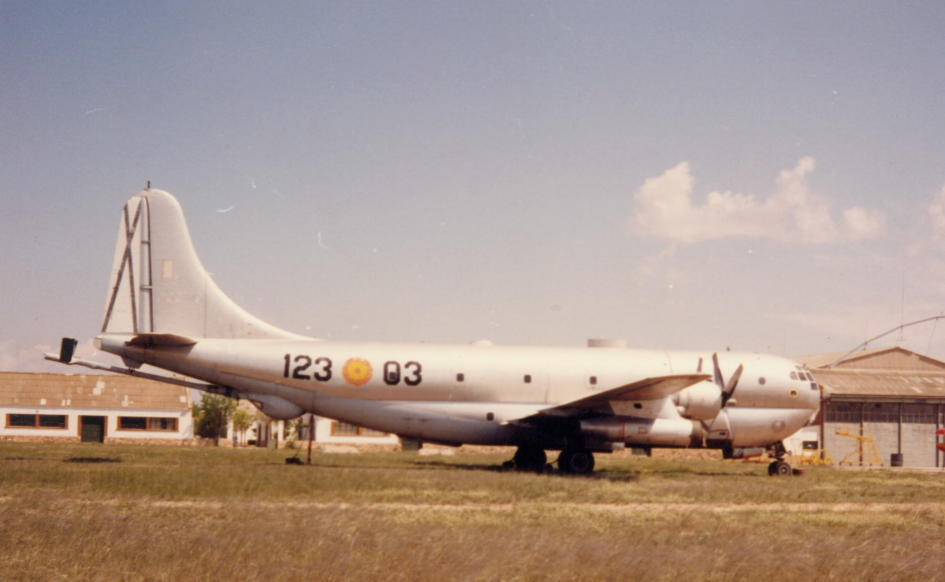
Spanish Boeing KC-97L Stratofreighter at Albacete, 1985

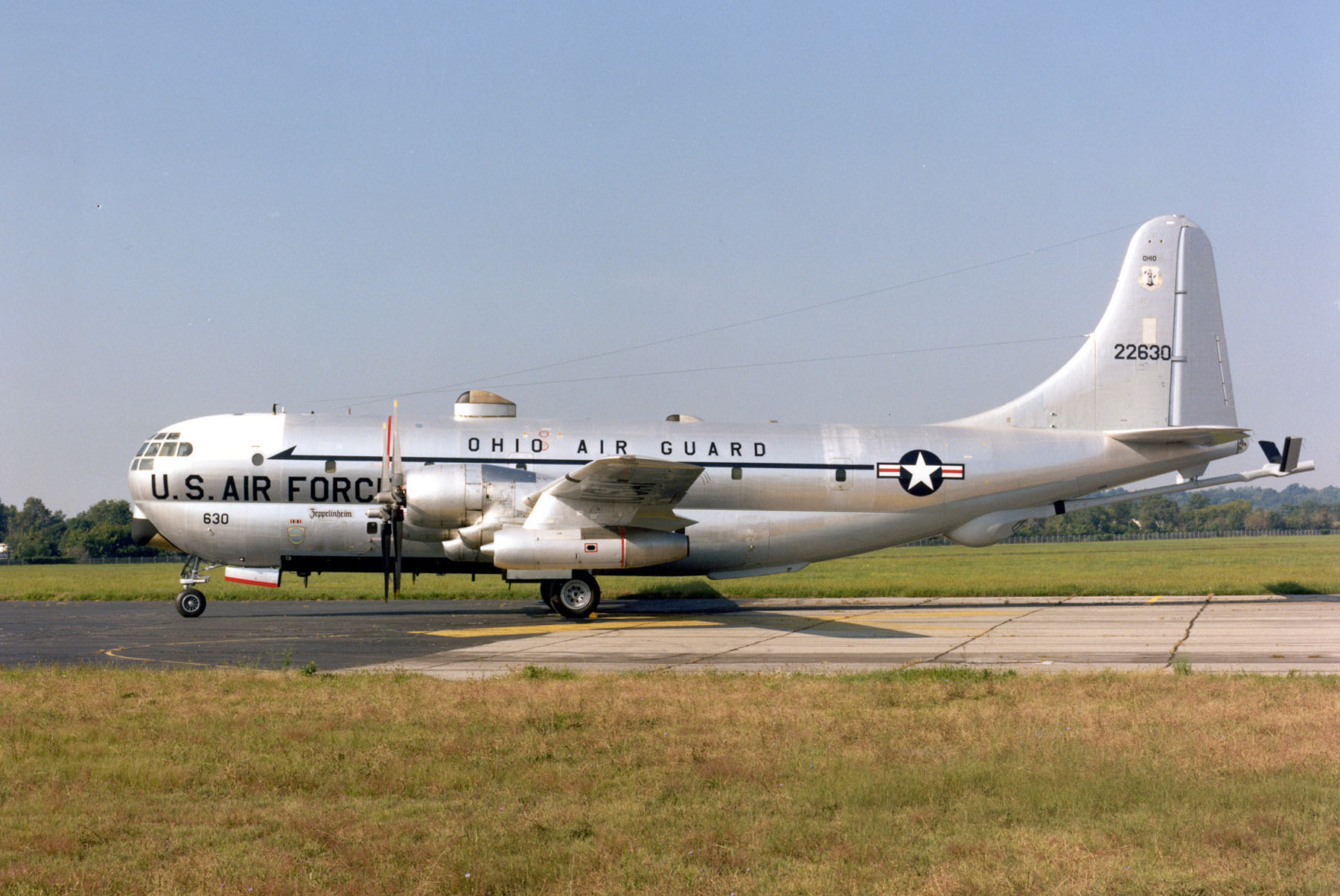
A KC-97L Stratofreighter (s/n 52-2630 Zeppelinheim) at the National Museum of the United States Air Force

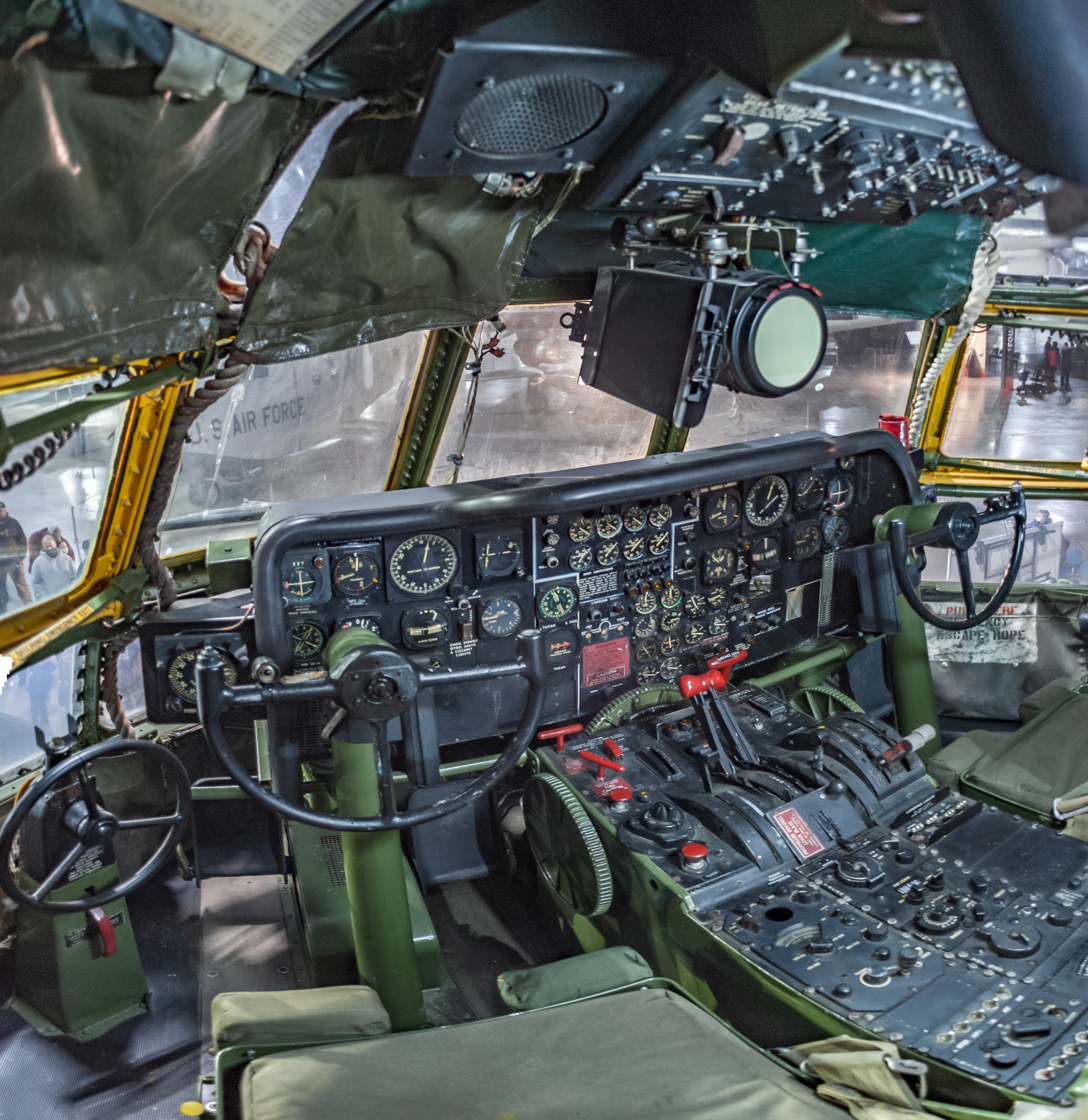
A Boeing KC-97 Stratofreighter's cockpit

A Boeing KC-97 Stratofreighter's Flight Engineer's panel

Spain

- Spanish Air Force (3 ex-USAF, 1972-1976)

United States

- United States Air Force

The following USAF wing organizations flew the various KC-97 models at some time during their existence:

=== Active duty ===
- 2d Bombardment Wing (Medium) – Hunter AFB, Georgia (1953–1963)
  - 2d Air Refueling Squadron
- 9th Bombardment Wing (Medium) – Mountain Home AFB, Idaho (1954–1965)
  - 9th Air Refueling Squadron
- 11th Air Refueling Wing – Altus AFB, Oklahoma (1957–1958)
  - 96th Air Refueling Squadron
- 19th Bombardment Wing (Medium) – Homestead AFB, Florida (1955–1961)
  - 19th Air Refueling Squadron
  - 100th Air Refueling Squadron
  - 303d Air Refueling Squadron
- 22d Bombardment Wing (Medium) – March AFB, California (1952–1962)
  - 22d Air Refueling Squadron
  - 22d Air Refueling Squadron – (relocated as a GSU to McChord AFB, Washington)
  - 320th Air Refueling Squadron
- 26th Strategic Reconnaissance Wing (Medium) – Lockborne AFB, Ohio (1953–1955; 1956–1958)
  - 26th Air Refueling Squadron
  - 321st Air Refueling Squadron
- 28th Bombardment Wing (Heavy) – Ellsworth AFB, South Dakota (1962–1964)
  - 97th Air Refueling Squadron – GSU Malmstrom AFB, Montana
- 40th Bombardment Wing (Medium) Schilling AFB, Kansas(1953–1960)
  - 40th Air Refueling Squadron
- 42d Bombardment Wing (Heavy) – Limestone AFB, Maine (1955–1957)
  - 42d Air Refueling Squadron
- 43d Bombardment Wing (Medium) – Davis-Monthan AFB, Arizona (1953–1960)
  - 9th Air Refueling Squadron
  - 43d Air Refueling Squadron
- 44th Bombardment Wing (Medium) – Lake Charles AFB, Louisiana (1953–1960)
  - 44th Air Refueling Squadron
- 68th Bombardment Wing (Medium) – Lake Charles AFB, Louisiana (1953–1957)
  - 68th Air Refueling Squadron
- 70th Strategic Reconnaissance Wing (Medium) – Little Rock AFB, Arkansas (1955–1961)
  - 70th Air Refueling Squadron
- 90th Bombardment Wing (Medium) – Fairchild AFB, Washington (1955–1960)
  - 90th Air Refueling Squadron
- 91st Bombardment Wing (Medium) – Glasgow AFB, Montana (1952–1957)
  - 26th Air Refueling Squadron
  - 68th Air Refueling Squadron
  - 91st Air Refueling Squadron
  - 100th Air Refueling Squadron
- 93d Bombardment Wing (Medium) – Castle AFB, California (1953–1957)
  - 90th Air Refueling Squadron
  - 93d Air Refueling Squadron
- 96th Bombardment Wing (Medium) – Altus AFB, Oklahoma (1954–1958)
  - 11th Air Refueling Squadron
  - 96th Air Refueling Squadron
  - 321st Air Refueling Squadron
  - 380th Air Refueling Squadron
- 97th Bombardment Wing (Medium) – Biggs AFB, Texas (1954–1957)
  - 97th Air Refueling Squadron
- 98th Bombardment Wing (Medium) – Lincoln AFB, Nebraska (1954–1963)
  - 98th Air Refueling Squadron
  - 307th Air Refueling Squadron
- 100th Bombardment Wing (Medium) – Portsmouth AFB/Pease AFB, New Hampshire (1956–1966)
  - 100th Air Refueling Squadron
  - 509th Air Refueling Squadron
- 301st Bombardment Wing (Medium) – Barksdale AFB, Louisiana/Lockborne AFB, Ohio (1953–1963)
  - 301st Air Refueling Squadron
- 303rd Bombardment Wing (Medium) – Davis-Monthan AFB, Arizona (1953–1956; 1960)
  - 9th Air Refueling Squadron
  - 43d Air Refueling Squadron
  - 96th Air Refueling Squadron
  - 303d Air Refueling Squadron
- 305th Bombardment Wing (Medium) – MacDill AFB, Florida (1951–1959)
  - 305th Air Refueling Squadron
- 306th Bombardment Wing (Medium) – MacDill AFB, Florida (1951–1962)
  - 306th Air Refueling Squadron
- 307th Bombardment Wing (Medium) – Lincoln AFB, Nebraska (1955–1960)
  - 307th Air Refueling Squadron
- 308th Bombardment Wing (Medium) – Hunter AFB, Georgia (1953–1959)
  - 303d Air Refueling Squadron
  - 308th Air Refueling Squadron
- 310th Bombardment Wing (Medium) – Smoky Hill AFB/Schilling AFB, Kansas (1952–1963)
  - 40th Air Refueling Squadron
  - 310th Air Refueling Squadron
- 320th Bombardment Wing (Medium) – March AFB, California (1952–1960)
  - 320th Air Refueling Squadron
- 321st Bombardment Wing (Medium) – Pinecastle AFB, Florida (1954–1956)
  - 307th Air Refueling Squadron
  - 321st Air Refueling Squadron
- 340th Bombardment Wing (Medium) – Whiteman AFB, Missouri (1954–1962)
  - 34th Air Refueling Squadron
  - 340th Air Refueling Squadron
- 341st Bombardment Wing (Medium) – Dyess AFB, Texas (1956–1960)
  - 11th Air Refueling Squadron
- 376th Bombardment Wing (Medium) – Barksdale AFB, Louisiana/Lockborne AFB, Ohio (1953–1963)
  - 91st Air Refueling Squadron
  - 376th Air Refueling Squadron
- 379th Bombardment Wing – Homestead AFB, Florida (1956–1961)
  - 19th Air Refueling Squadron
- 384th Air Refueling Wing (Heavy) – Little Rock AFB, Arkansas (1961–1963)
  - 70th Air Refueling Squadron
- 397th Bombardment Wing (Heavy) – Dow AFB, Maine (1963–1964)
  - 71st Air Refueling Squadron
  - 341st Air Refueling Squadron
- 407th Strategic Fighter Wing – Great Falls AFB, Montana (1953–1957)
  - 407th Air Refueling Squadron
- 497th Air Refueling Wing – Plattsburgh AFB, New York (1962–1964)
  - 26th Air Refueling Squadron
  - 380th Air Refueling Squadron
- 499th Air Refueling Wing – Westover AFB, Massachusetts (1963–1965)
  - 11th Air Refueling Squadron – GSU Dover AFB, Delaware
  - 19th Air Refueling Squadron – GSU Otis AFB, Massachusetts
  - 99th Air Refueling Squadron (operated KC-135 & EC-135 aircraft only)
  - 303d Air Refueling Squadron – GSU Kindley AFB, Bermuda
  - 305th Air Refueling Squadron- GSU McGuire AFB, New Jersey
  - 384th Air Refueling Squadron – Westover AFB, Massachusetts (1963–1965)
- 500th Air Refueling Wing – Selfridge AFB, Michigan (1963–1964)
  - 44th Air Refueling Squadron
  - 307th Air Refueling Squadron
- 509th Bombardment Wing (Heavy) – Walker AFB, New Mexico/Pease AFB, New Hampshire (1954–1965)
  - 509th Air Refueling Squadron
- 4397th Air Refueling Training Wing – Randolph AFB, Texas (1958–1963)
  - 4397th Combat Crew Training Squadron
- 4050th Air Refueling Wing – Westover AFB, Massachusetts (1955–1962)
  - 11th Air Refueling Squadron – GSU Dover AFB, Delaware
  - 19th Air Refueling Squadron – GSU Otis AFB, Massachusetts
  - 26th Air Refueling Squadron – Westover AFB, Massachusetts
  - 303d Air Refueling Squadron – GSU Kindley AFB, Bermuda
  - 305th Air Refueling Squadron- GSU McGuire AFB, New Jersey
  - 384th Air Refueling Squadron – Westover AFB, Massachusetts (1963–1965)
- 4060th Air Refueling Wing – Dow AFB, Maine/Plattsburgh AFB, New York (1955–1962)
- 4108th Air Refueling Wing – Plattsburgh AFB, New York (1961–1965)
- 4045th Air Refueling Wing – Selfridge AFB, Michigan
- 4061st Air Refueling Wing – Malmstrom AFB, Montana (1957–1961)
  - 407th Air Refueling Squadron
- 4081st Strategic Wing – Ernest Harmon AFB, Newfoundland, Canada (1960–1966)
  - 376th Air Refueling Squadron

=== Air National Guard ===
- 106th Air Refueling Group – NAS New York/Floyd Bennett Field, then Suffolk County Airport, New York (1962–1972)
  - 102d Air Refueling Squadron
- 126th Air Refueling Wing – O'Hare International Airport, Illinois (1953–1976)
  - 108th Air Refueling Squadron
- 128th Air Refueling Wing – General Mitchell Air National Guard Base, Wisconsin (1962–1977)
  - 126th Air Refueling Squadron
- 134th Air Refueling Wing – McGhee Tyson Air National Guard Base, Tennessee (1964–1977)
  - 151st Air Refueling Squadron
- 146th Air Transport Wing- Van Nuys, California (1962–1967)
  - 115th Air Refueling Squadron
- 136th Air Refueling Wing – NAS Dallas, Texas (1965–1978)
  - 181st Air Refueling Squadron
- 139th Air Refueling Group – Rosecrans Air National Guard Base, Missouri (1969–1976)
  - 180th Air Refueling Squadron
- 151st Air Refueling Group – Salt Lake City Air National Guard Base, Utah (1972–1978)
  - 191st Air Refueling Squadron
- 160th Air Refueling Group – Lockborne AFB, Ohio (1965–1975)
  - 145th Air Refueling Squadron
- 161st Air Refueling Group – Goldwater Air National Guard Base, Arizona (1972–1977)
  - 197th Air Refueling Squadron
- 171st Air Refueling Wing – Pittsburgh IAP Air Reserve Station, Pennsylvania (1972–1977)
  - 147th Air Refueling Squadron

== Accidents and incidents ==
27 June 1954
KC-97G AF Ser. No. 52-2654 which departed from Altus Air Force Base, Oklahoma, encountered poor weather at its destination, March Air Force Base in California, and attempted to divert to Norton Air Force Base, but crashed into Box Springs Mountain north of Riverside, California, killing all 14 people on board.
4 May 1955
USAF KC-97G 53-0110 was flying in formation when it crashed into the Atlantic 90 mi off Iceland due to loss of control caused by an engine fire, killing all nine on board.
6 July 1956
USAF KC-97E 51-0220 crashed in a wooded area 45 mile northeast of Goose Bay, Canada after reporting an engine fire, killing all six on board.
22 January 1957
a KC-97G AF Ser. No. 53-0222 from Griffiss Air Force Base, New York, crashed in the foothills of the Adirondack Mountains, killing its crew of seven.
9 May 1957
KC-97F AF Ser. No. 51-0258 en route from Sidi Slimane Air Base, Morocco, to Lajes AB, Azores, ditched in the Atlantic 550 km (343.8 mls) SE of the Azores Islands following a double engine failure. All seven crew survived. The airplane floated for ten days before being sunk by the battleship USS Wisconsin.
18 July 1957
KC-97G AF Ser. No. 52-2737 from the 380th Air Refueling Squadron with a crew of eight, exploded and crashed into Lake Champlain at 2128 hrs., when two of the four engines failed three minutes after take-off from Plattsburgh AFB, New York. There were three survivors.
29 October 1957
KC-97G AF Ser. No. 52-2711 of the 509th Bomb Wing, out of Walker AFB, New Mexico, crashed 35 miles north of Flagstaff, Arizona, while on a nine-hour low-level survey flight to determine minimum altitude restrictions for B-47 training routes. The aircraft was seen over Gray Mountain, Arizona, at altitude of 60 feet shortly after 0830 hrs., and then heard striking a cloud-shrouded cliff face, killing 16 crew and strewing wreckage for 200 yards along mountainside.
22 July 1959
KC-97 AF Ser. No. 52-2703 of Pease Air Force Base crashed near Andover, New Hampshire, while on a nighttime training mission; all seven crewmen were killed.
14 December 1959
KC-97G AF Ser. No. 53-0231 of the 384th Air Refueling Squadron, out of Westover AFB, Massachusetts, collided with a B-52 during a refueling mission at an altitude of ~15,000 feet. The aircraft lost the whole left horizontal stabilizer and elevator, the rudder, and the upper quarter of the vertical stabilizer. The crew made a no-flap, electrical power off landing at night at Dow AFB, Maine; seven crew okay. "Spokesmen at Dow Air Force, Bangor, said the B52 [sic] apparently 'crowded too close' and rammed a fuel boom into the tail of a four-engined KC95 [sic] tanker plane." Aircraft stricken as beyond economical repair. Two crew on the B-52 ejected, parachuted safely, and were recovered by helicopters in a snow-covered wilderness area. The bomber and remaining eight crew safely landed at Westover AFB.
30 March 1960
KC-97 AF Ser. No. 51-0363 (Manufacturer's Serial Number 16430) ditched and sank off Cape Canaveral. This particular aircraft was lost due to engine damage caused by hail. The crash resulted in 3 fatalities of the 14 crew. The wreck of the aircraft was discovered in June 2015, in 365 feet of water by divers.
15 April 1960
KC-97G AF Ser. No. 52-0919 of the 307th Air Refueling Squadron, 307th Bomb Wing, crashed on take-off from Lincoln AFB, Nebraska, after the undercarriage collapsed. All 24 on board survived, with two airmen suffering leg fractures and five others with minor cuts and burns.
27 June 1960
KC-97G AF Ser. No. 52-2728 of the 380th Air Refueling Squadron, Plattsburgh AFB, New York, suffered failure of lubrication on an engine impeller shaft during an evening four-hour training mission to refuel a Boeing B-47 Stratojet. During rendezvous at 15,500 feet, the tanker's number one (port outer) powerplant caught fire. As the bomber moved away from the burning tanker, the crew tried unsuccessfully to put out the blaze. The plane went into a spin as the wing failed outboard of the engine; the aircraft crashed on Jonathan Smith Mountain, a hill east of Puzzle Mountain in Newry, Maine. The flash of the fire was seen from as far away as Lewiston and Bridgton. All five crew were killed. Wreckage covering five acres was still there as of 2010.
28 February 1961
KC-97 AF Ser. No. UNKNOWN of Selfridge Air Force Base, MI. Aircraft crashed shortly after take-off due to engine failure. All five crew members were killed. The aircraft struck houses and an ornamental windmill that was a landmark along Gratiot Rd. (M-25), just north of the base. The attached article incorrectly identifies Selfridge AFB as Selfridge ANGB. Selfridge was not transferred to the Air National Guard July 1971. https://www.baaa-acro.com/crash/crash-boeing-kc-97-stratotanker-selfridge-afb-5-killed
10 December 1962
U.S. Air Force Boeing KC-97G Stratofreighter (serial number 52-2685) experienced an in-flight fire, forcing the crew of ten to bail out over Watkins Glen, New York. The aircraft continued flying more than 600 miles before crashing in a remote area near Mistassini Lake, Quebec, Canada. One crew member was killed during the bail-out attempt when his parachute malfunctioned.https://aviation-safety.net/wikibase/333185
5 November 1964
KC-97 AF Ser. No. unknown of Pease Air Force Base crashed on takeoff; all five crewmen were killed.
19 December 1964
USAF KC-97G 52-907 ran off the runway at Ernest Harmon AFB after the pilot landed too far down the runway, killing all five on board. The pilot attempted to abort the landing, but the aircraft struck approach lights and crashed into a pond.
19 January 1969
Wisconsin Air National Guard KC-97L 52-0904 crashed short of the runway at General Mitchell Airport, killing four of 11 on board.
17 September 1971
KC-97G IAF Serial 4X-FPR/033 of the Israeli Air Force, was shot down by Egyptian missiles over Suez, Egypt; seven of eight-man crew were killed.

== Surviving aircraft ==
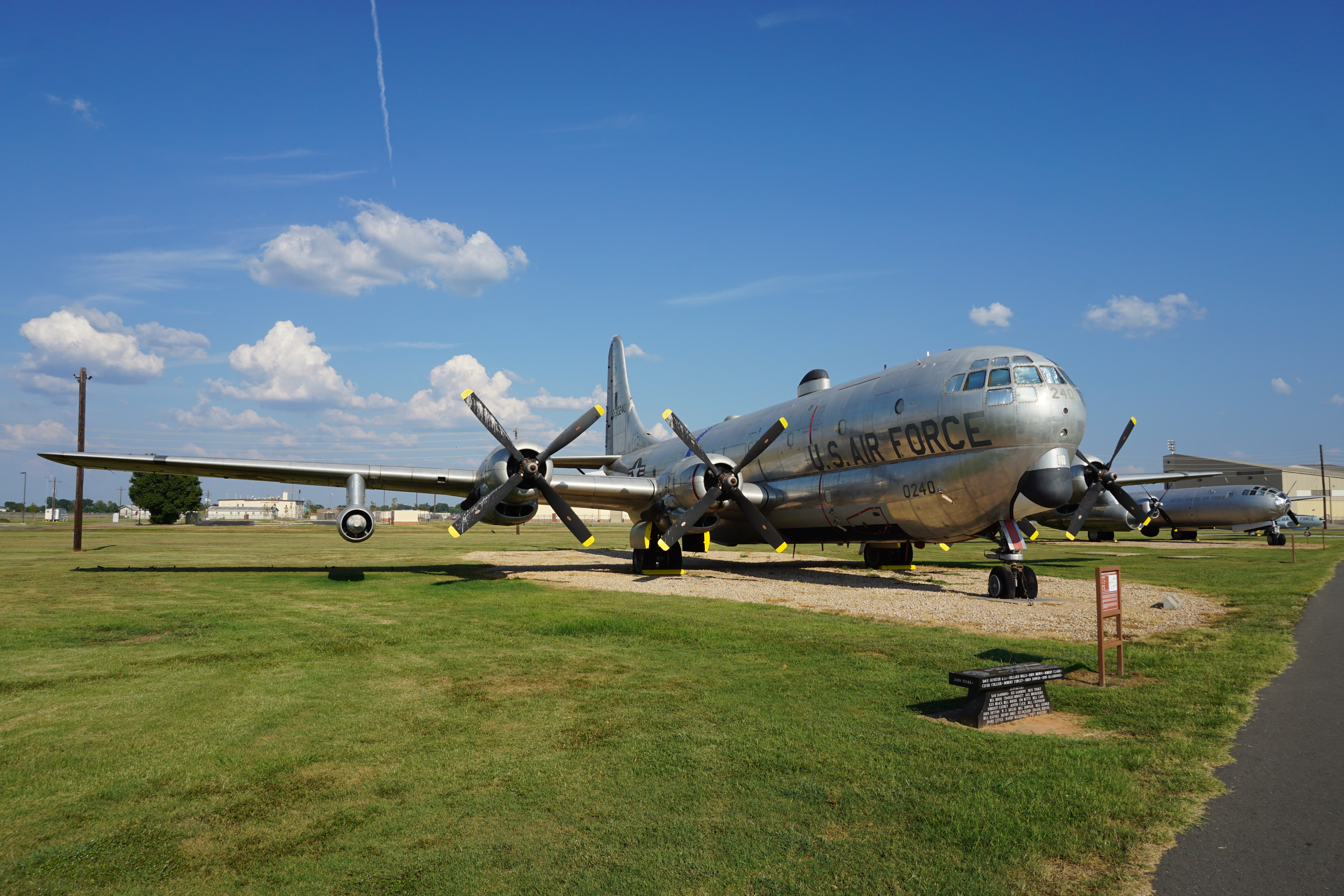
KC-97G/L at the Barksdale Global Power Museum

=== On display ===
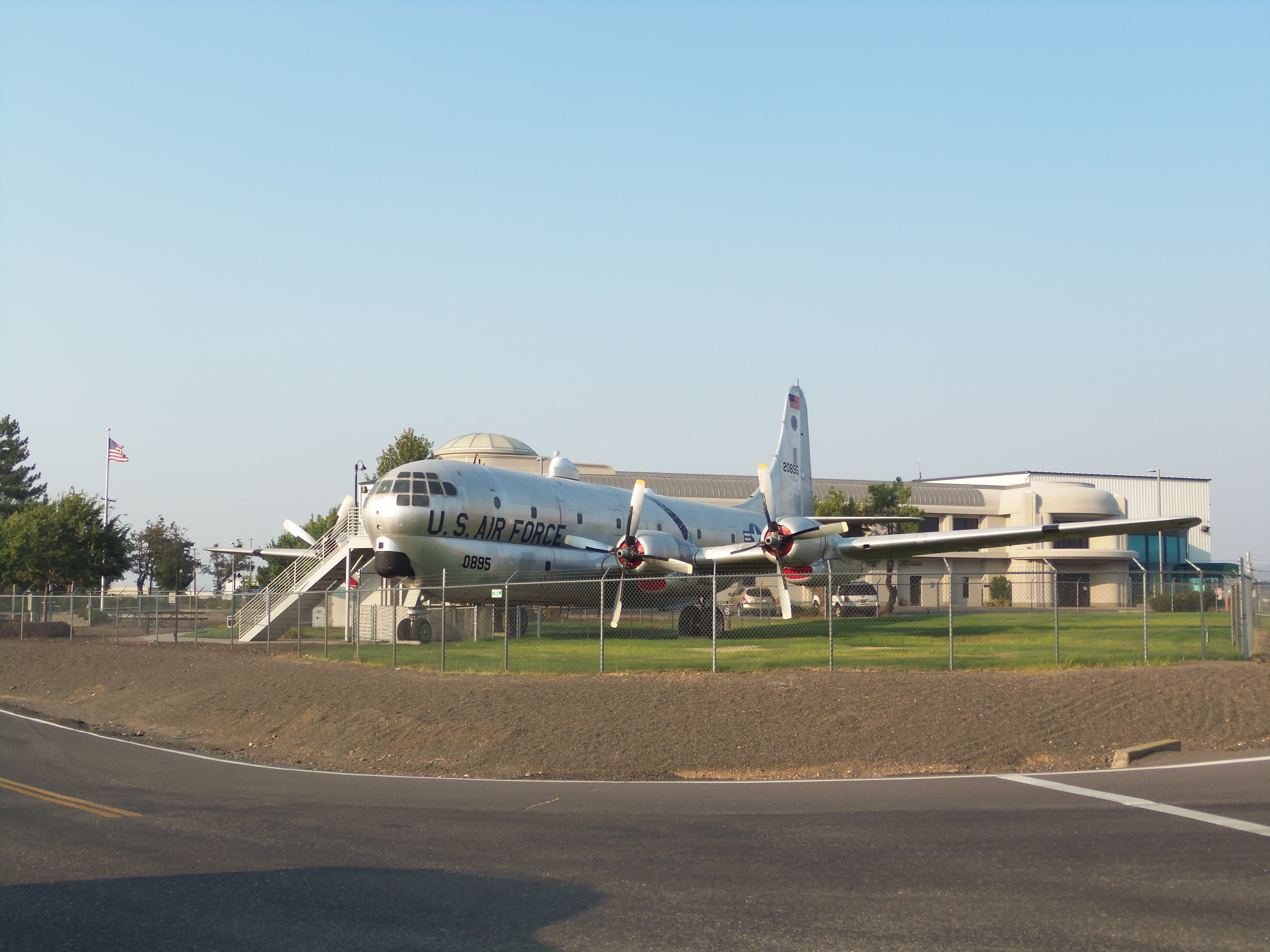
KC-97G #52-895 pictured at Rogue Valley International-Medford Airport in Medford, Oregon

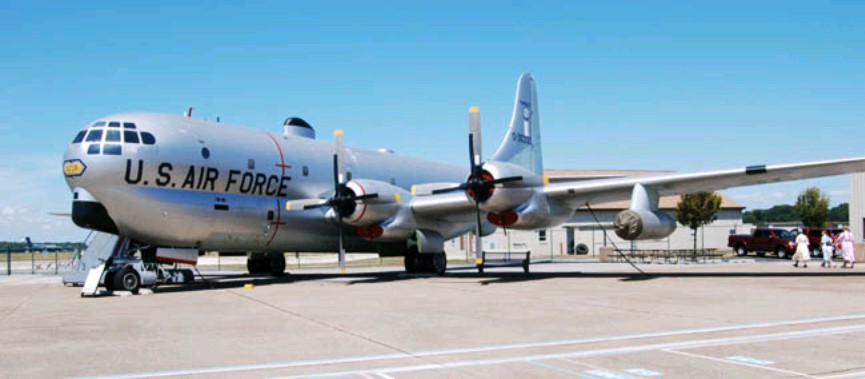
KC-97G #53-230 pictured at Air Mobility Command Museum at Dover Air Force Base, Delaware

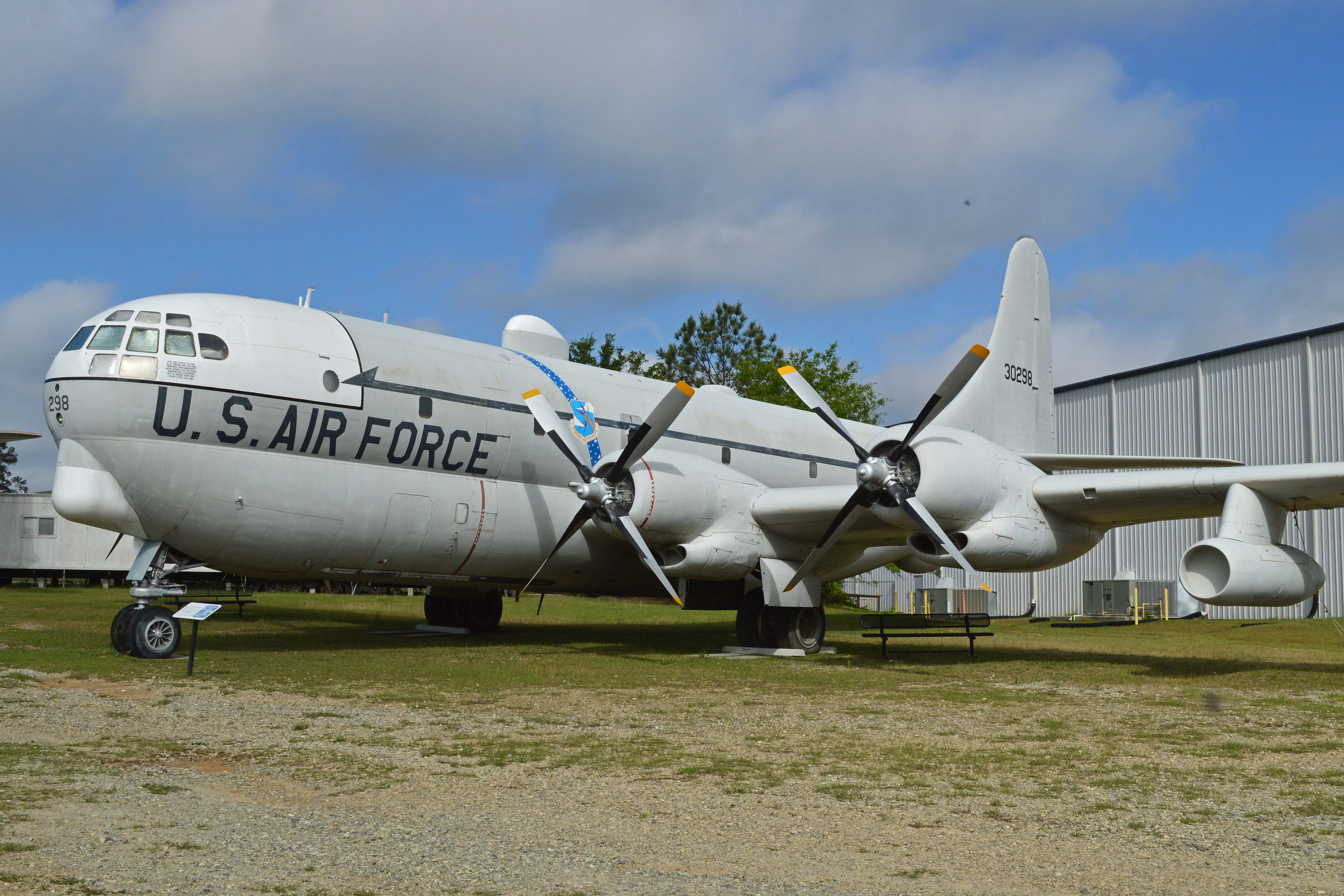
KC-97L #53-298 pictured at Museum of Aviation at Robins Air Force Base in Georgia

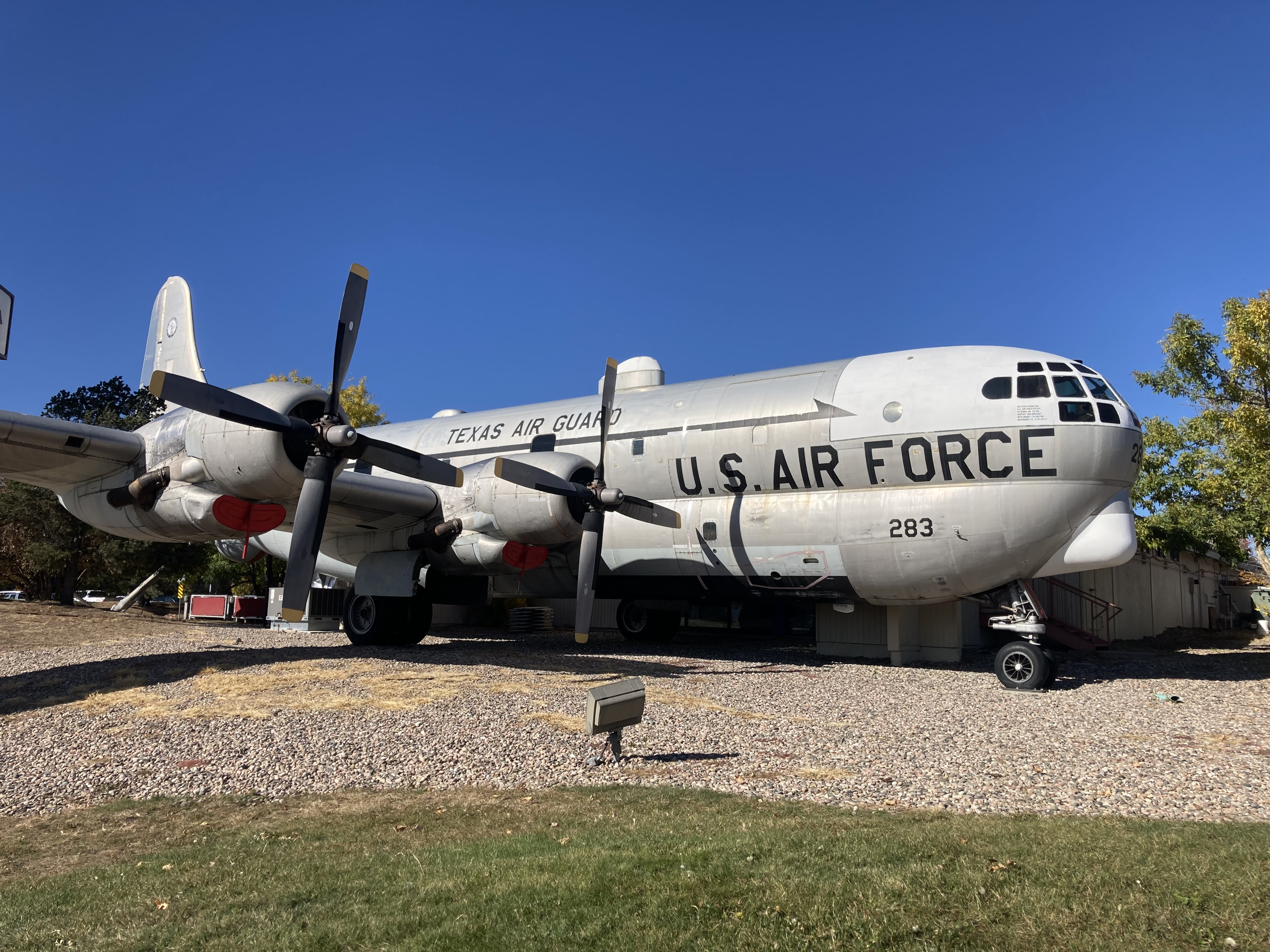
KC-97G 53-283 at The Airplane Restaurant Colorado Springs

==== KC-97G ====
- 52-895 – Rogue Valley International-Medford Airport in Central Point, Oregon.
- 52-905 – Wisconsin National Guard Museum at Volk Field Air National Guard Base in Camp Douglas, Wisconsin.
- 52-2604 – Cleveland I-X Center grounds in Cleveland Ohio.
- 52-2624 – Florence Air & Missile Museum, Florence Regional Airport, Florence, South Carolina, which is now closed. Following museum closure, parts were used complete the KC-97, AF Ser. No. 53-0335, on display at the Carolinas Aviation Museum.
- 52-2630 "Zeppelinheim" – National Museum of the United States Air Force at Wright-Patterson Air Force Base near Dayton, Ohio.
- 52-2697 – Grissom Air Museum at Grissom Air Reserve Base (former Grissom AFB) in Peru, Indiana.
- 52-2736 – Israeli Air Force Museum adjacent to Beersheba, Israel.
- 53-151 – Pima Air and Space Museum adjacent to Davis-Monthan Air Force Base in Tucson, Arizona.
- 53-189 (Spanish Serial Number TK1-3) – Museo del Aire (Spain) at Cuatro Vientos Airport in Madrid, Spain. Former USAF aircraft.
- 53-198 – Strategic Air Command & Aerospace Museum near Ashland, Nebraska.
- 53-218 – Minnesota Air National Guard Museum, St. Paul, Minnesota. Displayed in C-97G configuration.
- 53-230 – Air Mobility Command Museum at Dover Air Force Base, Delaware.
- 53-240 – Barksdale Global Power Museum at Barksdale Air Force Base, Louisiana.
- 53-272 – Milestones of Flight Museum, General William J. Fox Airfield, Lancaster, California, which is now closed.
- 53-282 – Dyess Linear Air Park at Dyess Air Force Base in Abilene, Texas.
- 53-283 – The Airplane Restaurant adjacent to Peterson Air Force Base and Colorado Springs Municipal Airport in Colorado Springs, Colorado.
- 53-298 – Museum of Aviation at Robins Air Force Base in Georgia.
- 53-327 – Whiteman Air Force Base in Knob Noster, Missouri.
- 53-335 – Carolinas Aviation Museum, north of Charlotte Air National Guard Base at Charlotte-Douglas International Airport in Charlotte, North Carolina. The museum is closed with a planned re-opening in 2022.
- 53-354 – Castle Air Museum at the former Castle Air Force Base in Atwater, California.
- 53-360 – Malmstrom Museum, Malmstrom Air Force Base, Montana. Displayed as 52-2638.
- 53-363 – March Field Air Museum at March Air Reserve Base (former March AFB) in Riverside, California.

=== Stored ===
==== KC-97G ====
- 52-918 – privately owned in Riverton, Wyoming.
- 52-2698 – privately owned in Greybull, Wyoming.

==== KC-97L ====
- 52-2695 – privately owned in Greybull, Wyoming.
- 52-2761 – privately owned in Greybull, Wyoming.
- 53-208 – privately owned in Riverton, Wyoming.
- 53-265 – privately owned in Riverton, Wyoming.
- 53-350 – privately owned in Riverton, Wyoming.

== In popular culture ==
The KC-97 Stratofreighter is shown in both its cargo and tanker tasks in the 1955 film Strategic Air Command, refueling a B-47 in flight, and in the 1957 film Bombers B-52, refueling B-52s.

== Specifications (KC-97L) ==
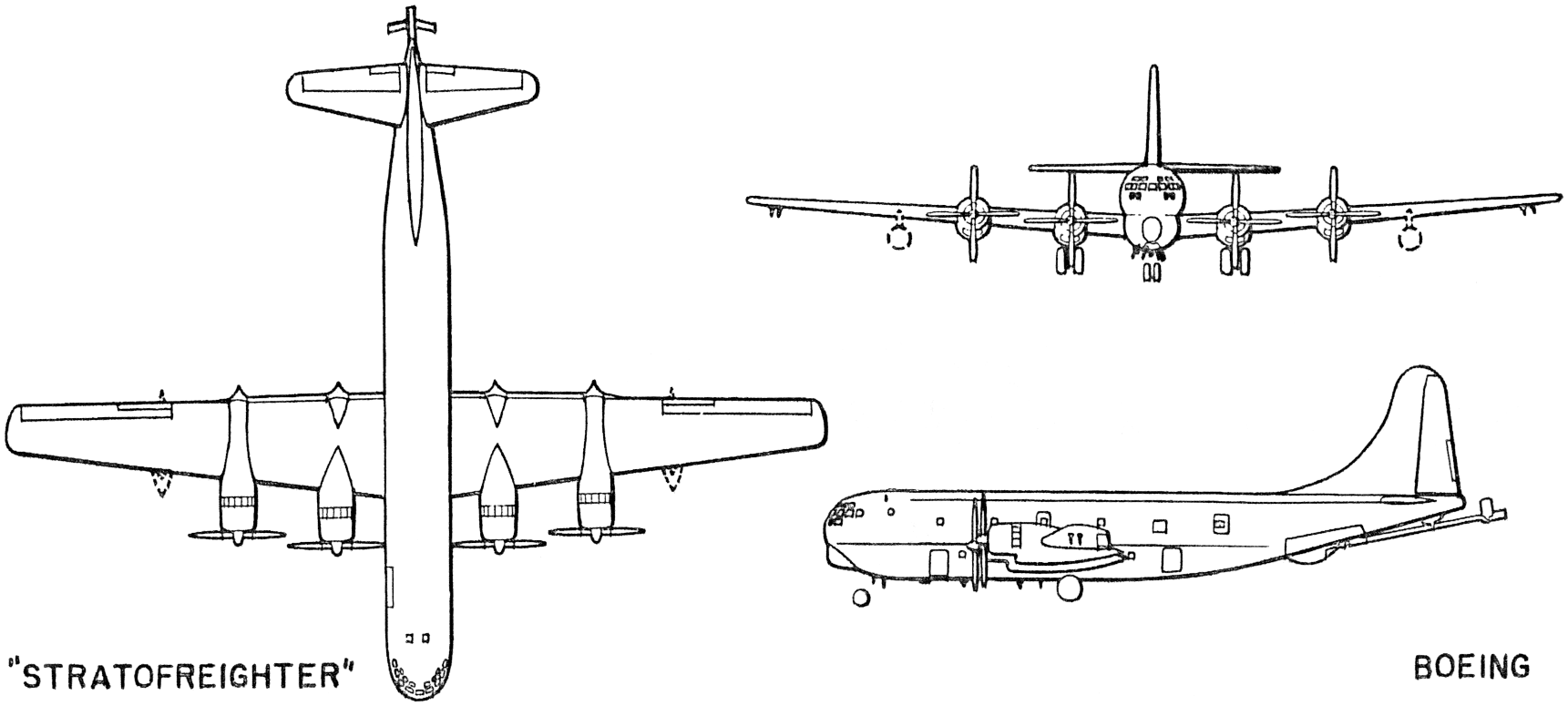
3-view line drawing of the Boeing KC-97G Stratofreighter

Data from USAF Museum, FAS: KC-97 Stratotanker

General characteristics

- Crew: 6 (aircraft commander, copilot, navigator, flight engineer, radio operator, boom operator)
- Capacity: 9,000 US gal (7,500 imp gal; 34,000 L) deliverable fuel
- Length: 117 ft 5 in (35.79 m)
- Wingspan: 141 ft 2 in (43.03 m)
- Height: 38 ft 4 in (11.68 m)
- Wing area: 1,734 sq ft (161.1 m^{2})
- Airfoil: root: Boeing 117 (22%); tip: Boeing 117 (9%)
- Empty weight: 82,500 lb (37,421 kg)
- Gross weight: 153,000 lb (69,400 kg)
- Max takeoff weight: 175,000 lb (79,379 kg)
- Powerplant: 4 × Pratt & Whitney R-4360-59 Wasp Major 28-cylinder air-cooled radial piston engines, 3,500 hp (2,600 kW) each
- Powerplant: 2 × General Electric J47-GE-23 turbojet engines, 5,790 lbf (25.8 kN) thrust each in pylon mounted pods
- Propellers: 4-bladed Hamilton Standard constant-speed fully-feathering propellers

Performance

- Maximum speed: 400 mph (640 km/h, 350 kn)
- Cruise speed: 230 mph (370 km/h, 200 kn)
- Range: 2,300 mi (3,700 km, 2,000 nmi)
- Service ceiling: 30,000 ft (9,100 m)

== See also ==
Related development

- Boeing C-97 Stratofreighter
- Boeing B-50 Superfortress
- Boeing 377 Stratocruiser
- Aero Spacelines Pregnant Guppy
- Aero Spacelines Super Guppy

Aircraft of comparable role, configuration, and era

- Douglas C-124 Globemaster II
- Lockheed C-121 Constellation
- Lockheed L-1249 Super Constellation (R7V-2/YC-121F)

Related lists

- List of military aircraft of the United States
- List of United States military aerial refueling aircraft
