= 307th Air Refueling Squadron =

Inactive US Air Force unit

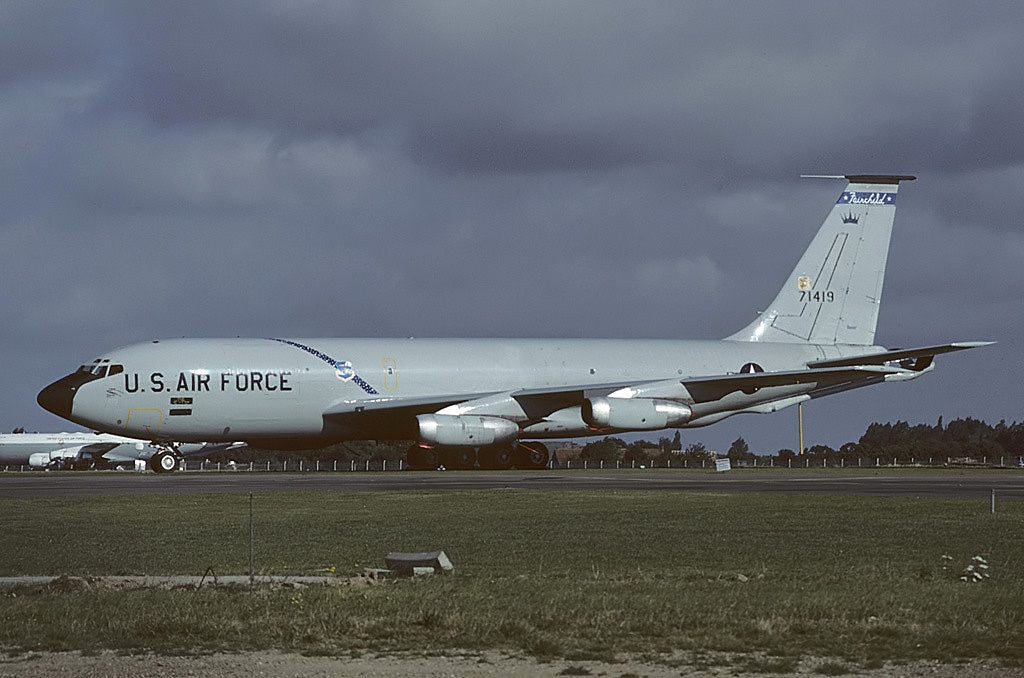
- KC-135A Stratotanker in SAC markings
- Active: 1950–1953; 1954–1966; 1985–1990
- Country: United States
- Branch: United States Air Force
- Role: Aerial refueling
- Motto: Anytime Anyplace (1961–1990)
- Decorations: Air Force Outstanding Unit Award

Insignia
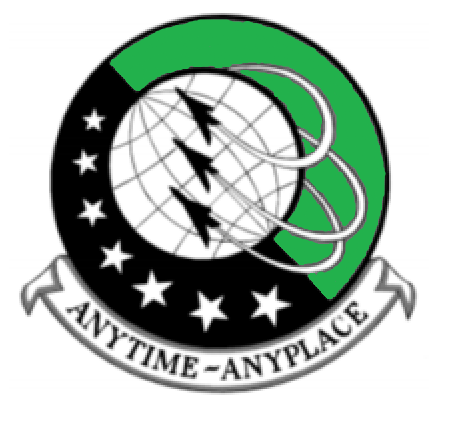
- 307th Air Refueling Squadron emblem (approved 12 May 1961)

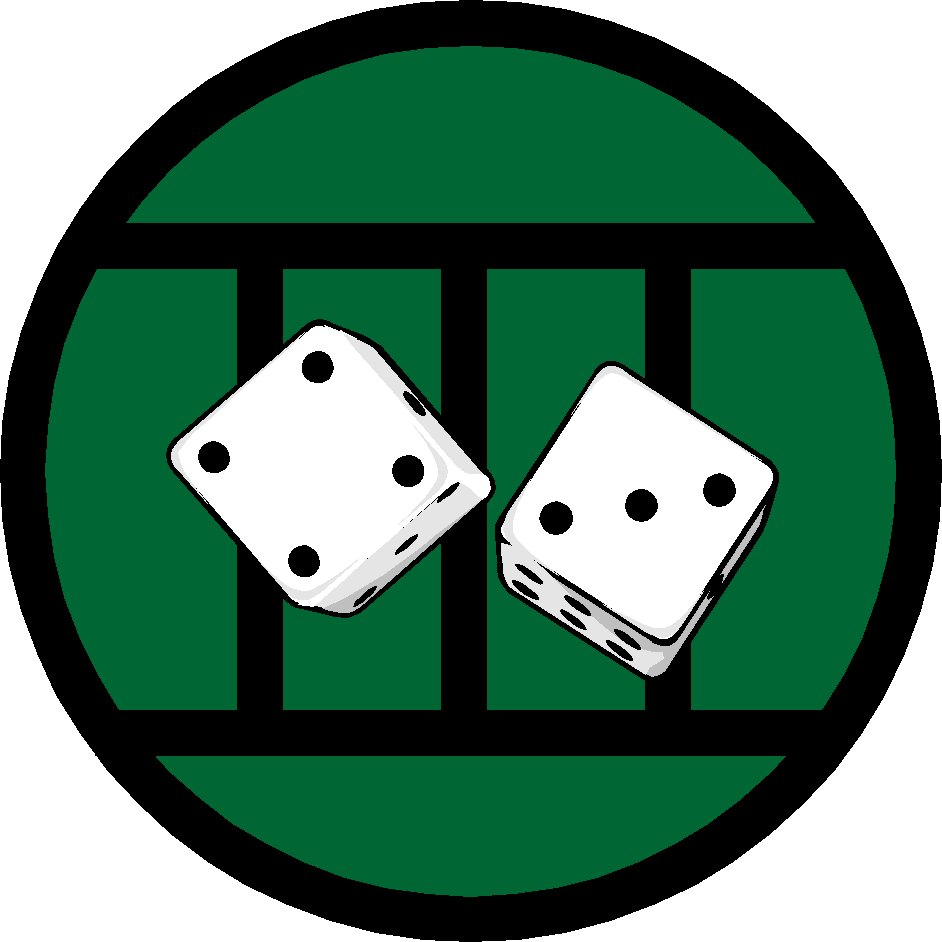
- 307th Air Refueling Squadron emblem (1950–1961)

The 307th Air Refueling Squadron is an inactive United States Air Force unit. It was last assigned to the 410th Bombardment Wing, stationed at K.I. Sawyer AFB, Michigan. It was inactivated on 1 August 1990.

== History ==
The 307th ARS was first activated in June 1950 and attached to the 307th Bombardment Wing at MacDill Air Force Base, Florida. The unit, however, was located at Davis–Monthan Air Force Base, Arizona for flying. The 307th gained its crews and equipment from the inactivated 2d Air Refueling Squadron (which later started up again at Hunter Air Force Base, Georgia). 307th crews flew the KB-29M Superfortress, a British grappling hose-type refueling aircraft. On 1 August 1951, the people and equipment inactivated and stayed at Davis–Monthan to form the 9th Air Refueling Squadron.

In August 1951, upon relocating to Walker Air Force Base, New Mexico, the 307th refueled other aircraft by using the KB-29P Superfortress, a boom type refueling system developed by Boeing. It was at Walker that the squadron performed the first U.S. Air Force over-water fighter refueling mission. Many people assigned to the squadron during this time participated in Project Ivy, the atomic tests in the Pacific.

After relocating to Bergstrom Air Force Base, Texas, the unit performed refueling missions for the 27th Fighter-Escort Wing F-84 Thunderjet aircraft within the 42d Air Division. However, when everyone but one officer and one airman were reassigned, the squadron was inactivated on 18 November 1953.

Just six months later, the unit was reactivated and flew out of Maxwell Air Force Base, Alabama, with KC-97 Stratofreighter aircraft. Another six months later, after being a tenant unit, the squadron was happy to move to Lincoln Air Force Base, Nebraska, and rejoin the 307th Bombardment Wing. From 1955 to 1960 the 307th deployed to numerous bases outside the United States, providing tanker support for Strategic Air Command (SAC) forces.

In June 1960 the unit moved once again to Selfridge Air Force Base, Michigan. After performing, for ten years, refueling commitments on a global scale, the squadron was inactivated on 25 June 1966. On 30 September 1985, the 307th was reactivated at a formal ceremony at K.I. Sawyer Air Force Base, Michigan. The squadron, assigned to the 410th Bombardment Wing at Sawyer, was flying for the first time, the KC-135A Stratotanker. The unit inactivated on 1 August 1990.

== Lineage ==
- Constituted as the 307th Air Refueling Squadron, Medium on 5 May 1950

Activated on 16 June 1950
Inactivated on 18 November 1953

- Reactivated on 18 May 1954

Discontinued and inactivated 25 June 1966

- Redesignated 307th Air Refueling Squadron, Heavy
- Activated on 30 September 1985

Inactivated on 1 August 1990

=== Assignments ===
- 307th Bombardment Group, 16 June 1950 (attached to 307th Bombardment Wing, c. 1 August 1950, 43d Bombardment Group, 15 September 1950, 43d Bombardment Wing, 9 February 1951, 6th Bombardment Wing after 1 August 1951)
- 307th Bombardment Wing, 16 June 1952 (attached to 47th Air Division, until 2 February 1953, then to 42d Air Division)
- 42d Air Division, 1 July 1953 – 18 November 1953 (attached to 27th Strategic Fighter Wing, 6 June–25 October 1953)
- Second Air Force, 18 May 1954 (attached to 321st Bombardment Wing after 28 September 1954)
- 307th Bombardment Wing, 8 November 1954 (attached to 98th Bombardment Wing to 1 February 1955)
- 4045th Air Refueling Wing, 1 June 1960
- 500th Air Refueling Wing, 1 January 1963
- 40th Air Division 15 December 1964 – 25 June 1966
- 410th Bombardment Wing, 30 September 1985 – 1 August 1990

=== Stations ===
- MacDill Air Force Base, Florida, 16 June 1950
- Davis–Monthan Air Force Base, Arizona, 16 September 1950
- Walker Air Force Base, New Mexico, 1 August 1951
- Bergstrom Air Force Base, Texas, 1 July 1953 – 18 November 1953
- Maxwell Air Force Base, Alabama, 18 May 1954
- Lincoln Air Force Base, Nebraska, 8 November 1954
- Selfridge Air Force Base, Michigan, 1 June 1960 – 25 June 1966
- K.I. Sawyer AFB, Michigan, 30 September 1985 – 1 August 1990

=== Aircraft ===
- KB-29M Superfortess, 1950–1951
- KB-29P Superfortress, 1951–1953
- KC-97G Stratotanker, 1954–1966
- KC-135A Stratotanker, 1985–1990
