= 321st Air Refueling Squadron =

Inactive US Air Force unit

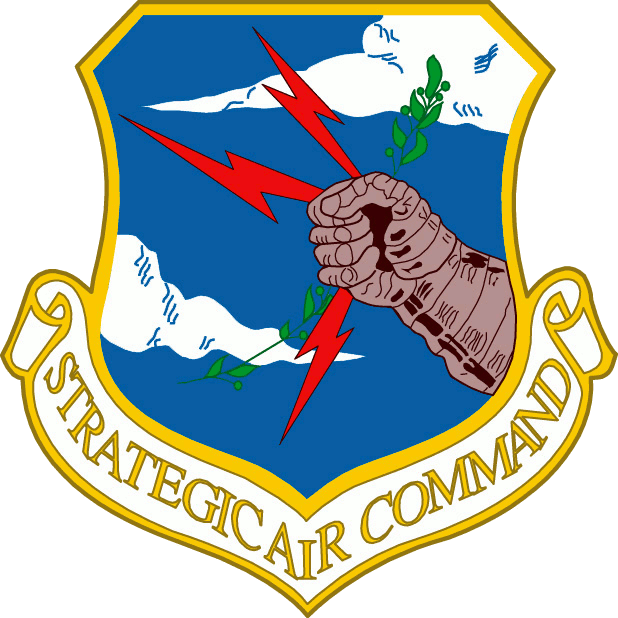
321st Refueling Squadron

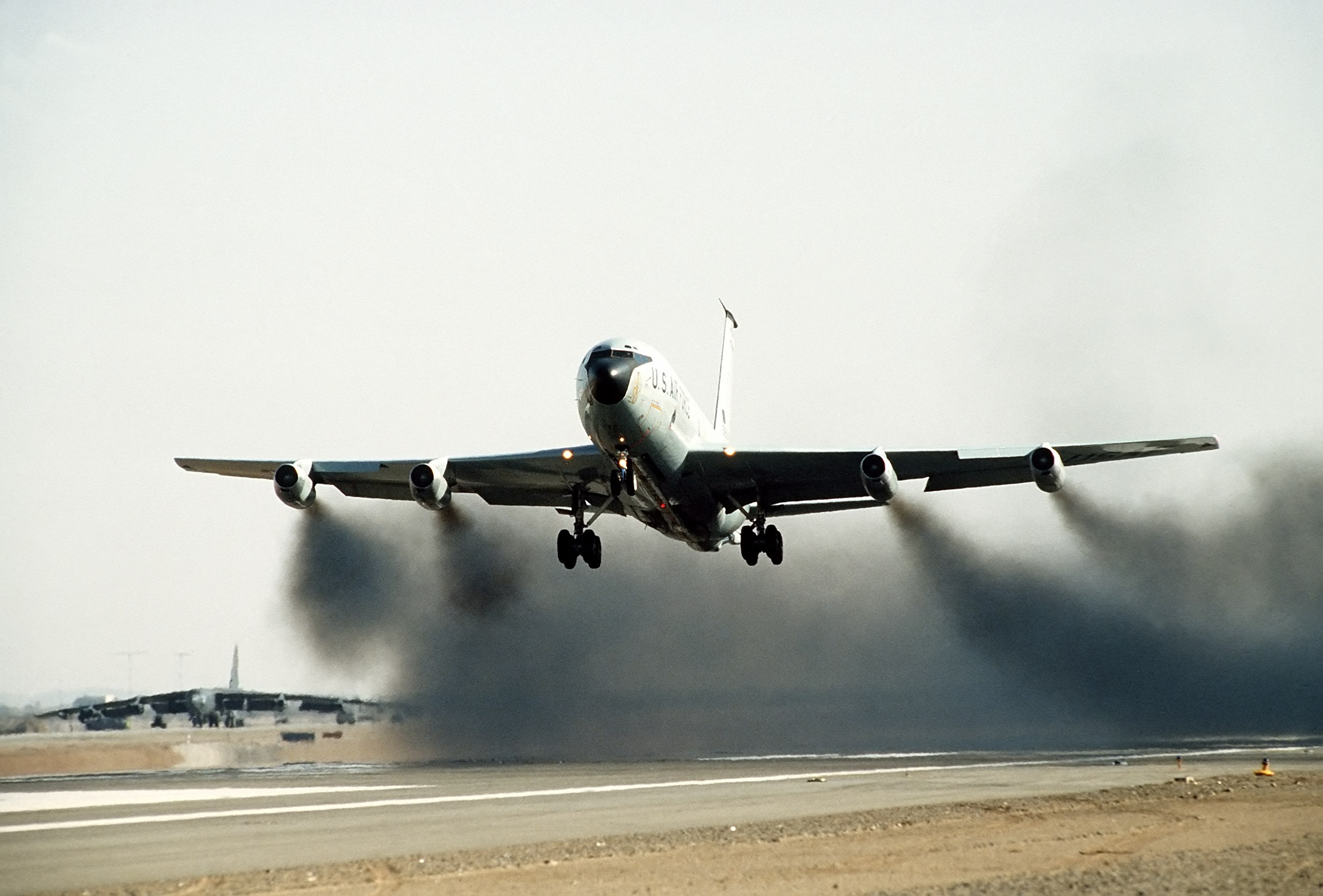
- KC-135A taking off
- Active: 1953–1965
- Country: United States
- Branch: United States Air Force
- Role: Aerial refueling
- Part of: Strategic Air Command

Insignia
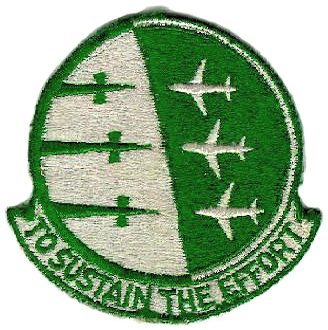
- 321st Refueling Squadron emblem

- 321st Air Refueling Squadron emblem (vector)

The 321st Air Refueling Squadron is an inactive United States Air Force unit. It was last assigned to the 301st Bombardment Wing at Lockbourne Air Force Base, Ohio, where it was inactivated on 15 March 1965.

The squadron was first active during World War II as the 321st Transport Squadron, operating a courier service from the United Kingdom and France until it was disbanded in 1945.

The 321st Air Refueling Squadron was activated as a Boeing KC-97 Stratofreighter squadron in 1953. In 1962, the unit converted to Boeing KC-135 Stratotankers, which it flew until it was inactivated in 1965 and replaced by the 32d Air Refueling Squadron.

The two squadrons were consolidated into a single unit in September 1985.

== History ==
=== World War II ===
The 321st Transport Squadron was one of five squadrons activated in November 1943 and assigned to the 27th Air Transport Group. It was located Northern Ireland and operated a courier service in the British Isles. In 1944 it moved to France and conducted the same duties on the European continent until it was disbanded in November 1945.

=== Cold War ===
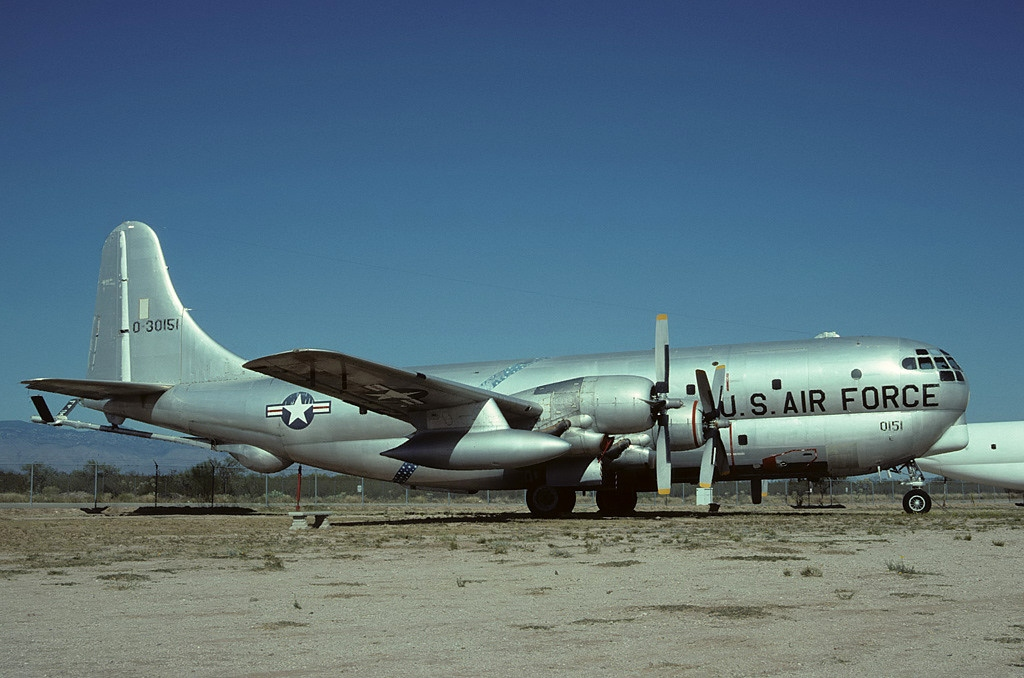
Boeing KC-97 Stratofreighter

Strategic Air Command (SAC) activated the 321st Air Refueling Squadron at Sheppard Air Force Base, Texas in late 1953 as a Boeing KC-97 Stratofreighter squadron. At Sheppard, the squadron was a tenant of Air Training Command's 3750th Air Base Group, the host organization at Sheppard, but was attached to the 96th Bombardment Wing at Biggs Air Force Base after July 1954. Four months later, it was assigned to the 321st Bombardment Wing at Pinecastle Air Force Base, Florida, but remained a tenant organization, moving to Maxwell Air Force Base, Alabama as a tenant of the 3800th Air Base Wing of Air University. It was not until August 1956, when the squadron moved to Lockbourne Air Force Base, Ohio, that it was stationed with its parent wing.

The squadron flew the KC-97 Stratofreighter, providing air refueling to USAF units, from 1953 until 1963. The squadron converted to Boeing KC-135 Stratotankers that year and was inactivated in 1965 and its mission, personnel and equipment were transferred to the 32d Air Refueling Squadron.

The 321st Transport Squadron and the 321st Air Refueling Squadron were consolidated into a single unit on 19 September 1985

== Lineage ==
321st Transport Squadron

- Constituted as the 321st Transport Squadron (Cargo and Mail) c. 26 October 1943

Activated 1 November 1943

- Disbanded 15 November 1945
- Reconstituted 19 September 1985 and consolidated with the 321st Air Refueling Squadron as the 321st Air Refueling Squadron

321st Air Refueling Squadron

- Constituted as the 321st Air Refueling Squadron, Medium on 17 September 1953

Activated on 8 December 1953

- Redesignated 321st Air Refueling Squadron, Heavy on 1 April 1963
- Discontinued and inactivated on 15 March 1965
- Consolidated on 19 September 1985 with the 321st Transport Squadron

=== Assignments ===
- 27th Air Transport Group, 1 November 1943
- Unknown, 11 November 1944 – 15 November 1945
- Eighth Air Force, 8 December 1953 (attached to 96th Bombardment Wing after 3 July 1954)
- 321st Bombardment Wing, 8 November 1954 (attached to 26th Strategic Reconnaissance Wing after 16 August 1956)
- 26th Strategic Reconnaissance Wing, 10 September 1956
- 301st Bombardment Wing (later 301st Air Refueling Wing), 15 April 1958 – 15 March 1965 (detached 11 April 1960 – 13 July 1960, 3 October 1961 – January 1962)

=== Stations ===
- Maghaberry (Station 239), Northern Ireland, 1 November 1943
- Langford Lodge (Station 597), Northern Ireland, May 1944
- RAF Grove, England (Station 519), September 1944
- Le Bourget Airport (Station 385, A-54), France, September 1944
- Villacoublay Airfield (A-42), March 1945 – 15 November 1945
- Sheppard Air Force Base, Texas, 8 December 1953
- Maxwell Air Force Base, Alabama, 8 November 1954
- Lockbourne Air Force Base, Ohio, 18 August 1956 – 15 March 1965

=== Aircraft ===
- Douglas C-47 Skytrain, 1943–1945
- Boeing KC-97 Stratofreighter, 1954–1963
- Boeing KC-135A Stratotanker, 1963–1965
