= 303rd Air Refueling Squadron =

Inactive US Air Force unit

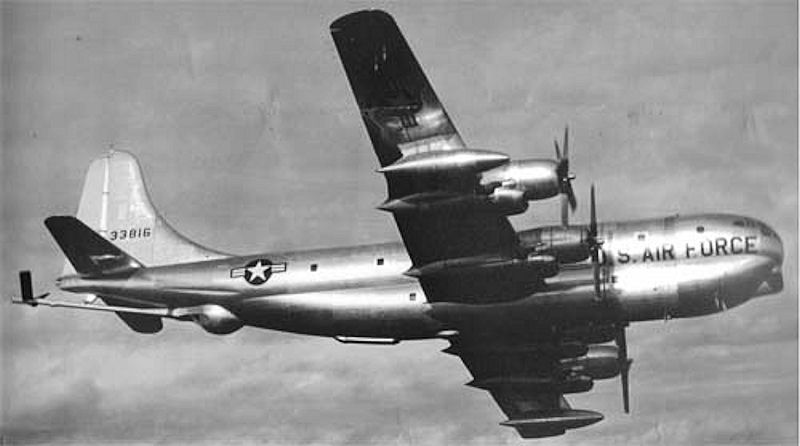
- Boeing KC-97G Stratofreighter as flown by the squadron
- Active: 1943; 1943-1946; 1951-1952; 1953-1963
- Country: United States
- Branch: United States Air Force
- Role: Aerial refueling
- Motto: Every Man a Tiger
- Engagements: China Burma India Theater; Pacific Ocean theater of World War II
- Decorations: Distinguished Unit Citation

Insignia
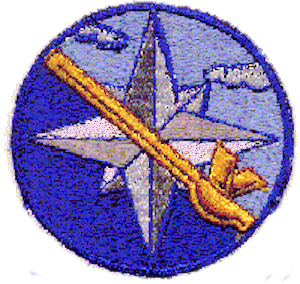
- Patch with later 303rd Air Refueling Squadron emblem

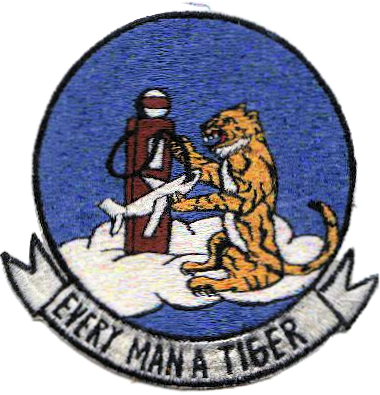
- Patch with early 303rd Air Refueling Squadron emblem

The 303rd Air Refueling Squadron is an inactive United States Air Force unit. It was last assigned to the 499th Air Refueling Wing at Kindley Air Force Base, Bermuda, where it was inactivated on 15 June 1963.

The squadron's first predecessor was active as the 303rd Transport Squadron, an airlift element of the India-China Wing, Air Transport Command. The 303rd flew missions over the Hump before being disbanded when Air Transport Command abandoned the traditional squadron and group organization for its operations in the China Burma India Theater.

The second predecessor of the squadron was the 483rd Bombardment Squadron, a very heavy Boeing B-29 Superfortress bomber squadron that, after training in the United States, moved to Tinian and engaged in the strategic bombing campaign against Japan from Tinian, earning two Distinguished Unit Citations for its combat actions. It then moved to the Philippines, where it was inactivated in 1946.

The unit's third predecessor is the 303rd Air Refueling Squadron, which served during the Cold War to support Strategic Air Command bombers. For most of its active life, the squadron operated from a forward base in the middle Atlantic to support Operation Reflex deployments and maintained readiness to support Emergency War Order missions.

In 1985, the United States Air Force consolidated three squadrons, but they have not been active since the consolidation.

== History ==
=== Flying the Hump ===
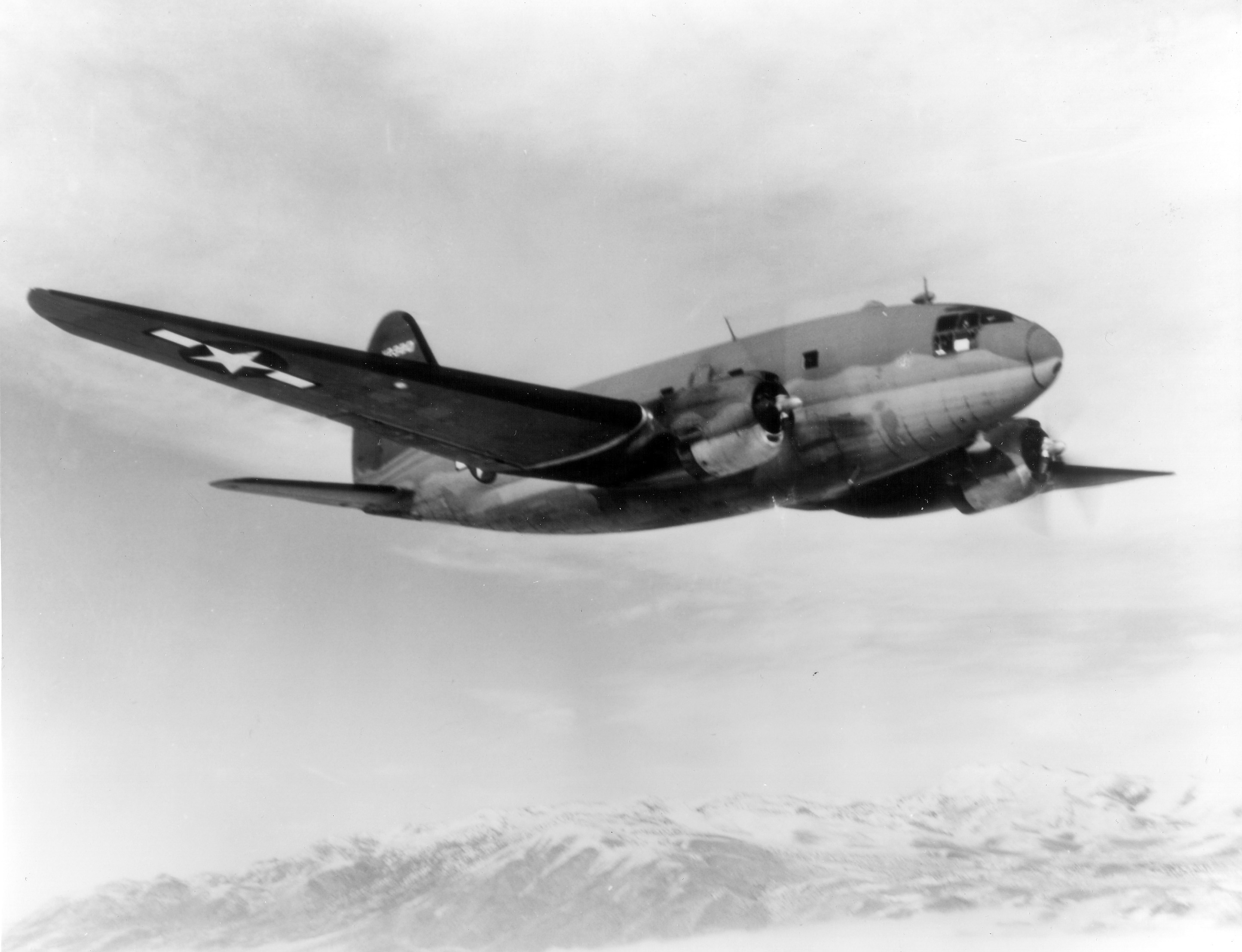
C-46 over the Hump

The 303rd Transport Squadron was activated in India in June 1943 at Mohanbari Airport, India, where it was assigned to the 30th Transport Group. The squadron drew its cadre from the 6th Transport Squadron. It operated Douglas C-47 Skytrain and Curtiss C-46 Commando transports in the China-Burma-India theater for the India-China Wing, Air Transport Command. It flew supplies, equipment and personnel over the Hump from the Assam Valley of India to airfields in southeast China, primarily to support Fourteenth Air Force combat operations. It was a short-lived organization for it was disbanded in December 1943 and replaced, along with other elements of the 30th Transport Group, by Station 9, India-China Wing, Air Transport Command.

=== B-29 Superfortress operations against Japan ===
==== Organization and training ====
The second 483rd Bombardment Squadron was activated at Dalhart Army Air Field, Texas in March 1944 as a Boeing B-29 Superfortress very heavy bombardment squadron, drawing its initial cadre from the 9th Bombardment Group. It moved to Harvard Army Air Field, Nebraska the following day, where the squadron began training with Boeing B-17 Flying Fortresses on 1 July until B-29s became available.

The squadron's ground echelon sailed from the Seattle Port of Embarkation for the Pacific on 14 November. The air echelon staged through Hamilton Field and Mather Field, California with its B-29s.

==== Combat Operations ====
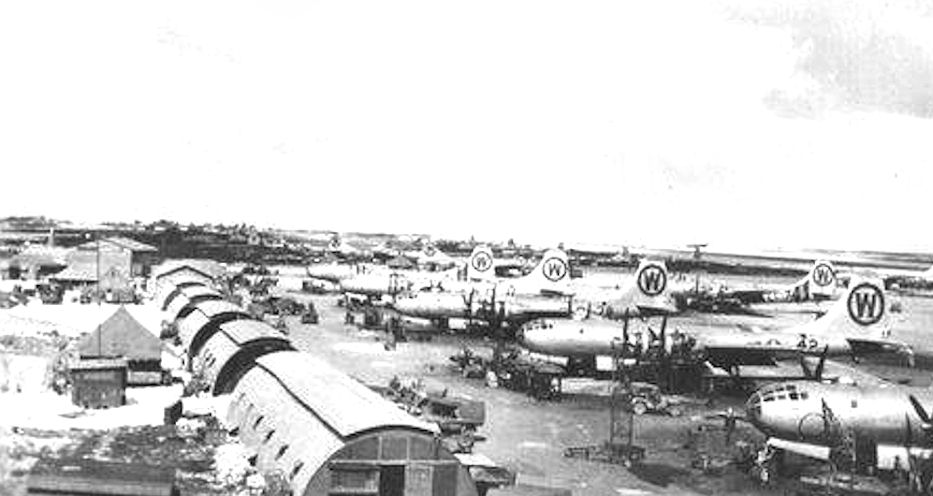
505th Bombardment Group B-29 Superfortresses at North Field, Tinian

The squadron arrived at its combat station, North Field, Tinian in the Mariana Islands on 24 December 1944. Three days later, it began flying training missions, including an attack on Moen Airfield in January. It flew its first combat mission on 24 January 1945 against targets on Iwo Jima and the Truk Islands. It began operations flying high altitude daylight missions, engaging in the strategic bombing campaign against Japan. On 10 February, it flew a strike on the Nakajima Aircraft Company factory at Ota, for which it was awarded a Distinguished Unit Citation (DUC). The 505th Group lost eight B-29s on the mission, but most were lost due to operational problems, rather than enemy action. However, The results of high altitude B-29 raids on Japan were disappointing. From 19 January, no mission had been able to bomb visually, and radar bombing results were generally unsatisfactory. Low altitude night area attacks with incendiaries promised better results, for XXI Bomber Command. The switch in tactics began with the launch of a raid against Tokyo on 9 March 1945.

The squadron conducted area raids with incendiaries until August 1945. During April 1945, the squadron was diverted from the strategic campaign against Japan to support Operation Iceberg, the invasion of Okinawa. It struck Miyazaki Airfield and Kanoya Airfield, bases from which kamikaze attacks were being launched. These bases were located on Kyushu, only 300 miles from Okinawa. The attacks directly impacted kamikaze launches, but also forced the Japanese military to retain fighter aircraft to defend the Japanese Special Attack Units that otherwise might have been used to challenge air superiority over Okinawa. (Note: 75% of Twentieth Air Force's missions in April and May 1945 were flown to support Operation Iceberg. Cate & Olson p. 631.)

The squadron also conducted aerial mining operations against Japanese shipping. The 505th was the only group in XXI Bomber Command to carry out these missions, which began on 27 March. On 17 June, the squadron concentrated its efforts on the mining campaign. It received a second DUC for mining the Shimonoseki Strait and harbors in the Inland Sea between 17 June and 1 July 1945. The squadron flew its last mission on the night of 14 and 15 August 1945. Following V-J Day its B-29s carried relief supplies to Allied prisoner of war camps. It also flew show of force flights and conducted bomb damage assessment flights over Japan. It moved to Clark Field in the Philippines in March 1946, and was inactivated there on 15 June 1946.

=== Strategic Air Command ===
The 303rd Air Refueling Squadron was activated in April 1951 at Davis-Monthan Air Force Base, Arizona and assigned to the 303rd Bombardment Group, but attached to the 303rd Bombardment Wing. it was nominally a KB-29 Superfortress unit, but never became operational and was inactivated seven months later.

The squadron was activated again in February 1953, again at Davis Monthan, where it was assigned to the 303rd Bombardment Wing and equipped with Boeing KC-97 Stratofreighters. The following month the wing's first Boeing B-47 Stratojets arrived and the squadron trained to refuel these jet bombers. The squadron deployed with the wing to RAF Greenham Common from 4 March to 28 April 1954, moving to RAF Fairford until 5 June 1954, when Greenham Common's runway was closed for repair. During the deployment with the wing, the squadron's aircraft also served as transports, carrying extra air crew, support personnel, and spare parts. In November 1954, it participated in Operation Green Point, which tested the 303rd Wing's air refueling capability. From February through April 1955, the squadron deployed to a Harmon Air Force Base in Operation Sand Truck.

SAC had begun to include refueling in its war plans, and decided to deploy its KC-97s to forward locations, placing them ahead of the faster B-47 Stratojets they would refuel. In February 1956, the squadron moved from Davis-Monthan to Kindley Air Force Base, Bermuda and was assigned to Second Air Force. At Kindley, it received administrative and logistic support from the 1604th Air Base Wing of Military Air Transport Service, which also supported additional KC-97s deployed to Kindley on temporary rotations. It supported B-47 Stratojets deploying to Europe and Morocco on Operation Reflex and provided forward refueling in the event of war. While stationed at Kindley the squadron was assigned to several headquarters located in the United States. The 303rd performed supported SAC and USAF operations on a worldwide basis until it was inactivated in 1963.

== Lineage ==
303rd Transport Squadron

- Constituted as 303rd Transport Squadron, c. 4 June 1943

Activated on 21 June 1943
Disbanded on 1 December 1943

- Reconstituted 19 September 1985 and consolidated with the 483rd Bombardment Squadron and the 303rd Air Refueling Squadron as 303rd Air Refueling Squadron (remained inactive)

483rd Bombardment Squadron

- Constituted as 483rd Bombardment Squadron, Very Heavy on 28 Feb 1944

Activated on 11 Mar 1944
Inactivated on 30 Jun 1946

- Consolidated on 19 September 1985 with the 303rd Transport Squadron and the 303rd Air Refueling Squadron as 303rd Air Refueling Squadron (remained inactive)

303rd Air Refueling Squadron

- Constituted as 303rd Air Refueling Squadron, Medium on 4 April 1951

Activated on 4 September 1951
Inactivated 8 April 1952

- Activated on 18 February 1953

Inactivated on 15 June 1963

- Consolidated on 19 September 1985 with the 483rd Bombardment Squadron and the 303rd Transport Squadron as the 303rd Air Refueling Squadron, Heavy (remained inactive)

=== Assignments ===
- 30th Transport Group, 21 June 1943 – 1 December 1943
- 505th Bombardment Group, 11 March 1944 – 30 June 1946
- 303rd Bombardment Group, 4 April 1951 – 8 April 1952 (attached to 303rd Bombardment Wing)
- 303rd Bombardment Wing, 18 February 1953 (detached 19 April – 2 June 1955)
- Second Air Force, 1 February 1956
- 38th Air Division, 1 January 1959
- 823rd Air Division, 1 October 1959
- 19th Bombardment Wing, 1 November 1959
- 4050th Air Refueling Wing, 1 April 1961
- 499th Air Refueling Wing, 1 January–15 June 1963

=== Stations ===
- Mohanbari Airport, Assam, India, 21 June 1943 – 1 December 1943
- Dalhart Army Air Field, Texas, 11 March 1944
- Harvard Army Air Field, Nebraska, 12 March 1944 – 6 November 1944
- North Field, Tinian, Mariana Islands, 24 December 1944 – 5 March 1946
- Clark Field, Luzon, Philippines, 14 March 1946 – 30 June 1946
- Davis-Monthan Air Force Base, Arizona, 4 April 1951 – 8 April 1952
- Davis-Monthan Air Force Base, Arizona, 18 February 1953
- Kindley Air Force Base, Bermuda, 6 February 1956 – 15 June 1963

=== Aircraft ===
- Douglas C-47 Skytrain, 1943
- Curtiss C-46 Commando, 1943
- Boeing B-17 Flying Fortress, 1944
- Boeing B-29 Superfortress, 1944–1946
- KB-29 Superfortress, 1951–1952
- Boeing KC-97F Stratofreighter, 1953-1956
- Boeing KC-97G Stratofreighter, 1956–1959; 1959–1963

=== Awards and campaigns ===
Award streamer	Award	Dates	Notes
	Distinguished Unit Citation	10 February 1945	Ota, Japan 303rd Bombardment Squadron
	Distinguished Unit Citation	17 June 1945 – 1 July 1945	Japan 303rd Bombardment Squadron

Campaign streamer	Campaign	Dates	Notes
	India-China	21 June 1943 – 1 December 1943	303rd Transport Squadron
	Air Offensive, Japan	24 December 1944–2 September 1945	303rd Bombardment Squadron
	Eastern Mandates (Air)	7 December 1943–14 April 1944	303rd Bombardment Squadron (Note: Campaign credit awarded for combat operations in the area, although outside the official period of the campaign.)
	Western Pacific (Air)	17 April 1945–2 September 1945	303rd Bombardment Squadron

== Notes ==
Explanatory notes

Citations

== Bibliography ==
- Craven, Wesley F; Cate, James L, eds. (1953). The Army Air Forces in World War II (PDF). Vol. V, The Pacific: Matterhorn to Nagasaki. Chicago, IL: University of Chicago Press. LCCN 48003657. OCLC 704158.

Cate, James L.; Olson, James C. (1953). "Strategic Bombardment from Pacific Bases, Chapter 17, Precision Bombardment Campaign". In Craven, Wesley F.; Cate, James L. (eds.). The Army Air Forces in World War II (PDF). Vol. V, The Pacific: Matterhorn to Nagasaki. Chicago, IL: University of Chicago Press. LCCN 48003657. OCLC 704158.
Cate, James L.; Olson, James C. (1953). "Strategic Bombardment from Pacific Bases, Chapter 19, Urban Area Attacks". In Craven, Wesley F.; Cate, James L. (eds.). The Army Air Forces in World War II (PDF). Vol. V, The Pacific: Matterhorn to Nagasaki. Chicago, IL: University of Chicago Press. LCCN 48003657. OCLC 704158.

- Maurer, Maurer, ed. (1983) [1961]. Air Force Combat Units of World War II (PDF) (reprint ed.). Washington, DC: Office of Air Force History. ISBN 0-912799-02-1. LCCN 61060979. Archived from the original (PDF) on 20 December 2016.
- Maurer, Maurer, ed. (1982) [1969]. Combat Squadrons of the Air Force, World War II (PDF) (reprint ed.). Washington, DC: Office of Air Force History. ISBN 0-405-12194-6. LCCN 70605402. OCLC 72556. Archived from the original (PDF) on 20 December 2016.
- Mueller, Robert (1989). Air Force Bases, Vol. I, Active Air Force Bases Within the United States of America on 17 September 1982 (PDF). Washington, DC: Office of Air Force History. ISBN 0-912799-53-6.
- Ravenstein, Charles A. (1984). Air Force Combat Wings, Lineage & Honors Histories 1947-1977 (PDF). Washington, DC: Office of Air Force History. ISBN 0-912799-12-9.
- Smith, Richard K. (1998). Seventy-Five Years of Inflight Refueling: Highlights, 1923-1998 (PDF). Air Force History and Museums Program. Washington, DC: Government Printing Office. ISBN 978-0160497797. Archived from the original (PDF) on 24 August 2017.
- "AF Pamphlet 900-2, Unit Decorations, Awards and Campaign Participation Credits" (PDF). Washington, DC: Department of the Air Force Index. 15 June 1971. Archived from the original (PDF) on 4 August 2015. (renumbered AF Pamphlet 36-2801, Vol. I)
