= 802d Air Division =

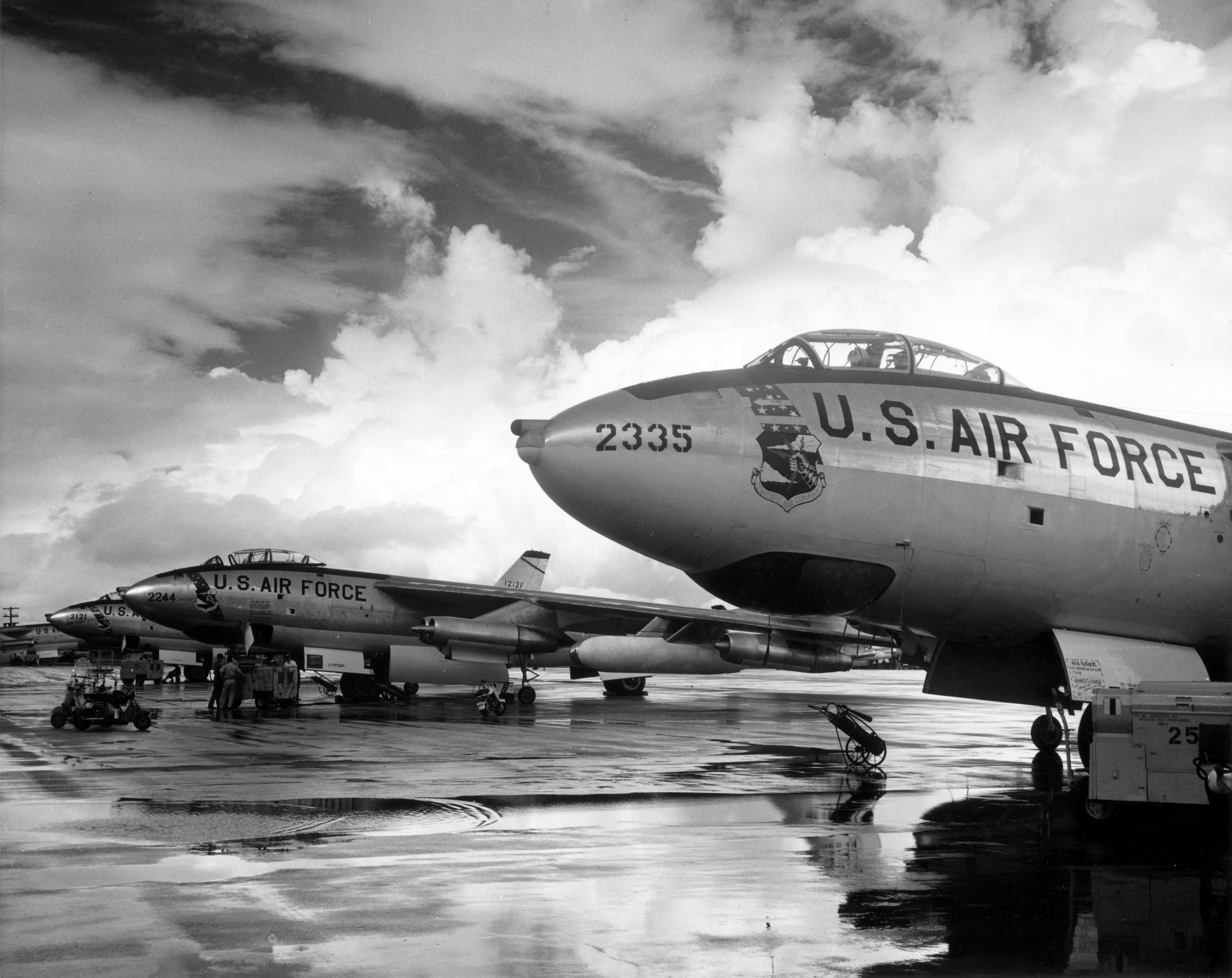
- Strategic Air Command Boeing B-47 Stratojets as flown by the 802d Air Division wings
- Active: 1952–1960
- Country: United States
- Branch: United States Air Force
- Role: Bombardment

Insignia
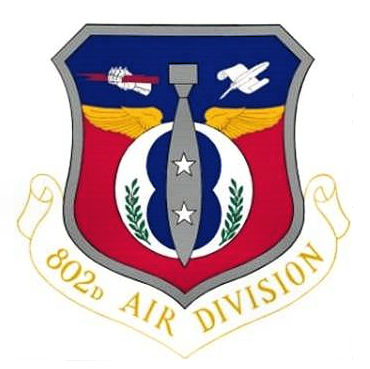
- 810th Strategic Aerospace Division emblem (Note: Approved 27 August 1954. Description: Per fess reverse arched and enhanced azure and gules, on a plate winged to chief or two hurts conjoined palewise between two olive branches vert, in pale overall a falling bomb gray tarnished with two mullets palewise argent, in chief in dexter a dexter mailed hand of the last [color mentioned] grasping a lightning flash fesswise of the second [color mentioned] and in sinister a scroll surmounted by a quill pen saltirewise of the sixth [color mentioned] all within a diminished border of the fifth [color mentioned].)

The 802d Air Division is a discontinued United States Air Force organization. Its last assignment was with Strategic Air Command, assigned to Fifteenth Air Force at Schilling Air Force Base, where it was inactivated on 20 June 1960.

Through most of its existence the division controlled bombardment wings flying Boeing B-47 Stratojets and based at Schilling. When its second wing was moved to another base as the B-47 was withdrawn from the United States Air Force inventory, only one SAC wing remained at Schilling and the division was inactivated.

== History ==
The 802d Air Division was activated at Smoky Hill Air Force Base, Kansas in 1952 when Strategic Air Command (SAC) departed from the wing base organization system and created air divisions as the headquarters on bases with two operational wings. The division's components, the 40th Bombardment Wing, 310th Bombardment Wing, and 802d Air Base Group, were all activated the same day as the division. The 310th wing was activated at Forbes Air Force Base, Kansas, where it trained with the Boeing B-29 Superfortress under the supervision of the 90th Bombardment Wing. It moved to Smoky Hill in September.

The 40th wing was not manned until early February 1953, when it began receiving personnel from the Tactical and Maintenance Squadron, Provisional, 40th at Davis Monthan Air Force Base, Arizona. This squadron had been formed as a holding organization for personnel surplus to the needs of the 43d Bombardment Wing. Once its personnel arrived at Smoky Hill, they began training with the 310th wing.

The division monitored and coordinated the manning, equipping, and training of its assigned wings for global strategic air warfare, including bombardment and air refueling operations and participated in exercises. In 1954, both of the division's wings transitioned into the Boeing B-47 Stratojet. Once the wings became combat ready in the B-47, they periodically deployed to advanced bases in England. During these deployments the wings came under the operational control of the 7th Air Division.

In March 1957 Smoky Hill was renamed Schilling Air Force Base in honor of Col. David C. Schilling, who had died in an automobile accident the previous year. In June 1960 the 40th wing moved on paper to Forbes Air Force Base, where it assumed the personnel and B-47s of the 90th Strategic Reconnaissance Wing, which was inactivated. With only a single wing remaining at Schilling, the 802d was inactivated and the 310th wing became the base host organization.

== Lineage ==
- Constituted as 802 Air Division on 9 May 1952

Activated on 28 May 1952
Discontinued on 20 June 1960

=== Assignments ===
- Fifteenth Air Force, 28 May 1952
- Eighth Air Force, 1 July 1955
- Fifteenth Air Force, 1 January 1959 – 20 June 1960

=== Stations ===
- Smoky Hill Air Force Base (later Schilling Air Force Base), Kansas, 28 May 1952 – 20 June 1960

=== Components ===
Wings

- 40 Bombardment Wing: 28 May 1952 – 20 June 1960 (attached to 310th Bombardment Wing 6 February – 1 May 1953; 7th Air Division 9 June 1955 – 9 September 1955 and c. 1 July 1957 – c. 1 October 1957)
- 310th Bombardment Wing: 28 May 1952 – 20 June 1960 (attached to 21st Air Division until 4 September 1952; 7th Air Division 10 March 1955 – 8 June 1955 and 3 October 1956 – 9 January 1957)

=== Groups ===
- 802d Air Base Group (later 802d Combat Support Group), 28 May 1952 – 20 June 1960
- 802d Medical Group, 1 February 1959 – 20 June 1960

=== Squadrons ===
- 310th Air Refueling Squadron, 1 March 1954 – 28 March 1954
- 550th Aviation Squadron, 1 March 1954 – 1 July 1954 (attached to 802d Air Base Group)

=== Other ===
- 4166th USAF Hospital, 15 February 1954 – 1 February 1959 (attached to 802d Air Base Group after April 1954)

=== Aircraft ===
- Boeing B-29 Superfortress, 1953 – 1954
- Boeing KC-97 Stratofreighter, 1953 – 1960
- Boeing B-47 Stratojet, 1954 – 1960

=== Commanders ===
- Col John H. de Russy, 11 June 1952
- Maj Gen Wiley D. Ganey, 25 November 1952
- Brig Gen John R. Sutherland, 24 April 1954
- Brig Gen James W. Wilson, 21 February 1956
- Col Harold W. Ohlke, 24 March 1958
- Col George Y. Jumper, 7 July 1959 – 20 June 1960

== See also ==
- List of United States Air Force air divisions
- List of USAF Bomb Wings and Wings assigned to Strategic Air Command
- List of B-29 Superfortress operators
- List of B-47 units of the United States Air Force
