= 45th Bombardment Squadron =

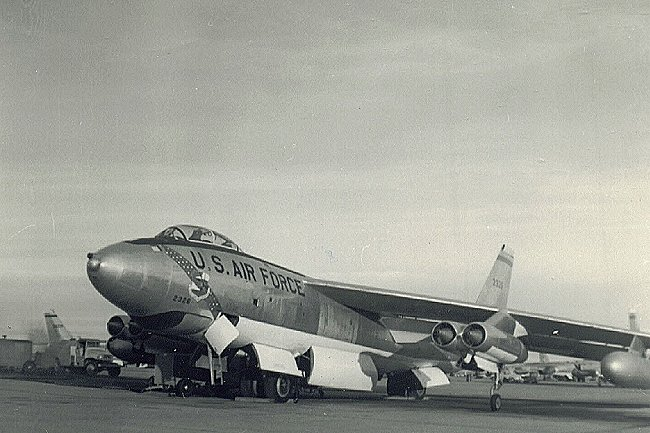
- 40th Bombardment Wing B-47 Stratojet at Smoky Hill Air Force Base
- Active: 1941–1946; 1952–1964
- Country: United States
- Branch: United States Air Force
- Role: Bombardment
- Engagements: China-Burma-India Theater; Pacific Theater
- Decorations: Distinguished Unit Citation

Insignia
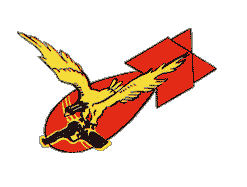
- 45th Bombardment Squadron emblem (Note: Approved 6 March 1942.)

The 45th Bombardment Squadron is an inactive United States Air Force unit. Its last assignment was with the 40th Bombardment Wing, based at Forbes Air Force Base, Kansas. It was inactivated on 1 September 1964.

== History ==
=== World War II ===
==== Antisubmarine Warfare ====
The 45th Bombardment Squadron was formed at Borinquen Field, Puerto Rico, on 1 April 1941, and assigned to the newly formed 40th Bombardment Group (Medium). Its initial mission was the aerial defense of Puerto Rico and the Antilles chain of islands. Equipped with Douglas B-18 Bolos.

After the Japanese Attack on Pearl Harbor, the unit was placed on full alert and all aircraft were kept armed and "bombed-up" at all times. On many occasions, the units' B-18's got off following a "scramble" on only 15 minutes notice. As the strength of Air Corps units in the Antilles grew and was augmented by Army Air Forces Antisubmarine Command and Navy air assets, it became possible to re-deploy the 45th to Panama to aid the hard-pressed Pacific and Caribbean approaches patrol forces there. Accordingly, on 7 June 1942 (following its redesignation as the 45th Bombardment Squadron (Heavy) on 7 May 1942) the Squadron departed for Panama by ship, arriving at France Field on 17 June where it was assigned LB-30 aircraft and later B-24s. Anti-submarine patrols were made over the Pacific.

On 18 February 1943 the 45th Bomb Squadron was transferred to Seymour Field, Galapagos Islands. In May it moved back to Panama, being assigned to Howard Field, Panama Canal Zone. With the general wind-down in action in the Caribbean, the Squadron was moved back to the United States in May 1943.

==== B-29 Superfortress ====
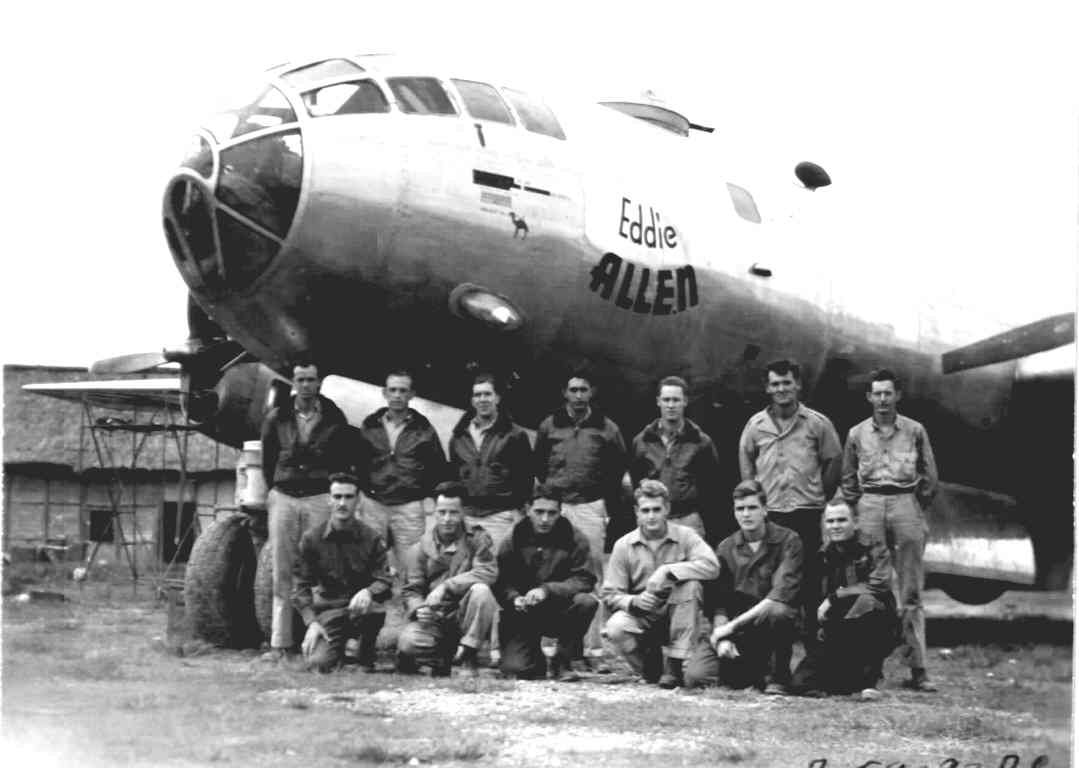
45th Bombardment Squadron B-29 Superfortress (Note: Aircraft is Boeing B-29-40-BW Superfortress, serial 42-24579 Eddie Allen. Photo taken in India or China, summer 1944. This plane was named after Eddie Allen, a chief test pilot at Boeing Aircraft Co., who built and presented the plane to the Army Air Forces, The test pilot was killed in the second experimental B-29.)

Moved to Pratt Army Air Field, Kansas in July 1943, being re-manned with new personnel. Received prototype and early production-model B-29 Superfortress very heavy bombers. Trained under Second Air Force for an extended period due to Boeing technicians making modifications of B-29 aircraft. Deployed to the new XX Bomber Command as part of the 58th Bombardment Wing in the China-Burma-India Theater, flying to bases in India via South Atlantic Transport route; across central Africa, Arabia to Karachi. Additional modifications of B-29s were necessary in India to accommodate very high ground temperatures of 115 °F (46 °C).

From airfields in eastern India, engaged in very long range bombardment raids on Japan. The squadron participated in the first American Air Force attack on the Japanese Home Islands since the 1942 Doolittle Raid on 15/16 June 1944, attacking the Imperial Iron and Steel Works at Yawata on Kyushu by using its forward staging base at Hsinching Airfield (A-1), China, for refueling. Performed a total of nine missions to Japan, also engaged in very long range attacks against enemy targets in Thailand, Manchuria, Borneo, Formosa, Burma, Malaya, Japanese-occupied China, Singapore, Saigon and Cam Rahn Bay, French Indochina. Also engaged in aerial mining of Japanese-occupied seaports in Thailand Malaya and French Indochina.

Advance of American forces in the Central Pacific though the Northern Mariana Islands made new airfields available within the effective bombing range of Japan. Moved to West Field on Tinian in April 1945, becoming part of the new XXI Bomber Command. From the Marianas, engaged in very long range strategic attacks on Japan, its first mission being on 5 May 1945 against the Hiro Naval Aircraft Factory in Kure. Air attacks over Japan were initially high-altitude daylight bombing missions against industrial, transportation and military targets, largely ineffective due to high upper-level winds dispersing bombs over a wide area. By July, began low-level large area night incendiary raids on urban areas, and dropped mines in Japanese shipping lanes. Continued aerial assaults until the Japanese Capitulation in August 1945, final combat mission taking place on 9/10 August attacking the Hikari Naval Arsenal.

After V-J Day, the squadron dropped food and supplies to Allied prisoners in Japan, Korea, and Formosa, and took part in show-of-force missions. Demobilized on Tinian in 1946, aircraft being returned to the United States for storage. Inactivated as a paper unit in October.

=== Strategic Air Command ===
Reactivated in 1953 under Strategic Air Command (SAC), receiving then second-line B-29s for training and organization. Replaced the propeller-driven B-29s with new Boeing B-47E Stratojet swept-wing medium bombers in 1954, capable of flying at high subsonic speeds and primarily designed for penetrating the airspace of the Soviet Union. In the late 1950s, the B-47 was considered to be reaching obsolescence, and was being phased out of SAC's strategic arsenal. Began sending aircraft to other B-47 wings as replacements in early 1964, being one of the last SAC squadrons equipped with the Stratojet. Inactivated in September when the last aircraft was retired.

=== Operations ===
- Combat Operations: Antisubmarine patrols, Dec 1941 – May 1943. Combat in CBI, 5 June 1944 – 29 March 1945, and Western Pacific, 5 May-14 Aug 1945.
- Campaigns: Antisubmarine, American Theater; India-Burma; Air Offensive, Japan; China Defensive; Western Pacific; Central Burma.

== Lineage ==
- Constituted as the 45th Bombardment Squadron (Medium) on 22 November 1940

Activated on 1 April 1941
Redesignated: 45th Bombardment Squadron (Heavy) on 7 May 1942
Redesignated: 45th Bombardment Squadron, Very Heavy on 20 November 1943
Inactivated on 1 October 1946
Redesignated: 45th Bombardment Squadron, Medium on 9 May 1952 (not operational until 30 September 1953)
Activated on 28 May 1952
Inactivated on 1 September 1964 (not operational after 15 August 1964)

=== Assignments ===
- 40th Bombardment Group, 1 April 1941 – 1 October 1946
- 40th Bombardment Wing (later 40th Strategic Aerospace Wing), 28 May 1952 – 1 September 1964

=== Stations ===
- Borinquen Field, Puerto Rico, 1 April 1941
- France Field, Panama Canal Zone, 17 June 1942
- David Field, Panama, 13 November 1942
- Seymour Island Airfield, Baltra, Galápagos Islands, 18 February 1943
- Howard Field, Panama Canal Zone, c. 22 May-15 June 1943
- Pratt Army Air Field, Kansas, 1 July 1943 – 12 March 1944
- Chakulia Airfield, India, c. 11 April 1944 – April 1945
- West Field Tinian), Mariana Islands, April-7 November 1945
- March Field, California, 27 November 1945
- Davis–Monthan Field, Arizona, c. 13 May-1 October 1946
- Smoky Hill Air Force Base, Kansas, 28 May 1952
- Forbes Air Force Base, Kansas, 20 June 1960 – 1 September 1964

=== Aircraft ===
- Douglas B-18 Bolo, 1941–1942
- Consolidated LB-30 Liberator, 1942–1943
- Consolidated B-24 Liberator, 1943
- Martin B-26 Marauder, 1943
- Boeing YB-17 Flying Fortress, 1943–1944
- Boeing YB-29 Superfortress, 1943–1944
- Boeing B-29 Superfortress, 1944–1946; 1953–1954
- Boeing B-47 Stratojet, 1954–1964
