= 44th Bombardment Squadron =

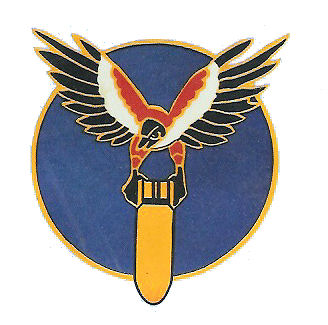
- Emblem of the 44th Bombardment Squadron (Note: Approved 7 February 1942. On and over a blue disc edged in gold a falcon affronte in red, white, and black, outlined in yellow, with wings displayed and carrying a yellow aerial bomb.)
- Active: 1940–1946; 1952–1964
- Country: United States
- Branch: United States Air Force
- Role: Bombardment
- Engagements: China-Burma-India theater

The 44th Bombardment Squadron is an inactive United States Air Force unit. Its last assignment was with the 40th Bombardment Wing, based at Forbes Air Force Base, Kansas. It was inactivated on 1 September 1964.

== History ==
=== World War II ===
==== Antisubmarine Warfare ====
Established in Puerto Rico, the unit was activated 1 April 1941 as the 44th Bombardment Squadron (Medium) and assigned to the 40th Bombardment Group. It trained with borrowed Douglas B-18 Bolo medium bombers and slowly received its own equipment.

Following the Japanese Attack on Pearl Harbor, the Squadron was ordered to Panama, and arrived at Balboa, Panama Canal Zone, on 5 June 1942. On 2 July 1942, the unit was redesignated as the 44th Bombardment Squadron (Heavy), following the air echelon's move to Guatemala City Air Base, Guatemala on 23 June. There the unit transitioned onto Boeing B-17E Flying Fortresses and, following familiarization with the much larger and complex aircraft, were almost immediately tasked with antisubmarine patrols duties between Guatemala City and the Galapagos Islands, the third-longest patrol route ever assigned any unit of the Air Corps to that time.

By 7 March 1943, still at Guatemala City, the Squadron had a mix of five B-17Es and three Consolidated B-24D Liberators. By 11 April, all of the B-17Es were transferred out and replaced by B-24Ds. The unit was moved to Howard Field, Panama Canal Zone on 19 May 1943 in preparation for its return to the United States, as the need for such a large number of bomber squadrons on the Pacific patrol routes had diminished. The unit left the Sixth Air Force on 15 June 1943.

==== B-29 Superfortress era ====
Moved to Pratt Army Air Field, Kansas in July 1943, being re-manned with new personnel. Received prototype and early production-model Boeing B-29 Superfortress very heavy bombers. Trained under Second Air Force for an extended period due to Boeing technicians making modifications of B-29 aircraft. Deployed to the new XX Bomber Command as part of the 58th Bombardment Wing in the China-Burma-India Theater, flying to bases in India via South Atlantic Transport route; across central Africa, Arabia to Karachi. Additional modifications of B-29s were necessary in India to accommodate very high ground temperatures of 115 °F (46 °C).

From airfields in eastern India, engaged in very long range bombardment raids on Japan. The squadron participated in the first American Air Force attack on the Japanese Home Islands since the 1942 Doolittle Raid on 15/16 June 1944, attacking the Imperial Iron and Steel Works at Yawata on Kyushu by using its forward staging base at Hsinching Airfield (A-1), China, for refueling. Performed a total of nine missions to Japan, also engaged in very long range attacks against enemy targets in Thailand, Manchuria, Borneo, Formosa, Burma, Malaya, Japanese-occupied China, Singapore, Saigon and Cam Rahn Bay, French Indochina. Also engaged in aerial mining of Japanese-occupied seaports in Thailand Malaya and French Indochina.

Advance of American forces in the Central Pacific though the Northern Mariana Islands made new airfields available within the effective bombing range of Japan. Moved to West Field on Tinian in April 1945, becoming part of the new XXI Bomber Command. From the Marianas, engaged in very long range strategic attacks on Japan, its first mission being on 5 May 1945 against the Hiro Naval Aircraft Factory in Kure. Air attacks over Japan were initially high-altitude daylight bombing missions against industrial, transportation and military targets, largely ineffective due to high upper-level winds dispersing bombs over a wide area. By July, began low-level large area night incendiary raids on urban areas, and dropped mines in Japanese shipping lanes. Continued aerial assaults until the Japanese Capitulation in August 1945, final combat mission taking place on 9/10 August attacking the Hikari Naval Arsenal.

After V-J Day, the squadron dropped food and supplies to Allied prisoners in Japan, Korea, and Formosa, and took part in show-of-force missions. Demobilized on Tinian in 1946, aircraft being returned to the United States for storage. Inactivated as a paper unit in October.

=== Strategic Air Command ===
Reactivated in 1953 under the Strategic Air Command (SAC), the unit initially received second-line B-29s for training and organizational purposes. In 1954, it replaced these propeller-driven B-29s with Boeing B-47E Stratojet medium bombers, which featured swept wings and were capable of high subsonic speeds, primarily designed to penetrate Soviet airspace. By the late 1950s, the B-47 was nearing obsolescence and began to be phased out of SAC's strategic fleet. Starting in early 1964, the unit transferred its aircraft to other B-47 wings as replacements, becoming one of the last SAC squadrons to operate the Stratojet. It was inactivated in September upon the retirement of its final aircraft.

=== Operations and decorations ===
- Combat Operations: Antisubmarine patrols, Dec 1941 – May 1943. Combat in CBI, 5 June 1944 – 29 March 1945, and Western Pacific, 5 May-14 Aug 1945.
- Campaigns: Antisubmarine, American Theater; India-Burma; Air Offensive, Japan; China Defensive; Western Pacific; Central Burma.
- Decorations: Distinguished Unit Citations: Yawata, Japan, 20 August 1944; Japan, 5–14 May 1945; Japan, 24 July 1945.

=== Lineage ===
- Constituted as the 44th Bombardment Squadron (Medium) on 22 November 1940

Activated on 1 April 1941
Redesignated 44th Bombardment Squadron (Heavy) on 7 May 1942
Redesignated 44th Bombardment Squadron, Very Heavy on 20 November 1943
Inactivated on 1 October 1946

- Redesignated 44th Bombardment Squadron, Medium on g May 1952

Activated on 28 May 1952
Inactivated on 1 September 1964

=== Assignments ===
- 40th Bombardment Group, 1 April 1941 – 1 October 1946
- 40th Bombardment Wing, 28 May 1952 – 1 September 1964

=== Stations ===
- Borinquen Field, Puerto Rico, 1 April 1941
- Howard Field, Panama Canal Zone, 16 June 1942
- Guatemala City AB, Guatemala, 6 July 1942
- Howard Field, Panama Canal Zone, C. 4–15 June 1943
- Pratt Army Air Field, Kansas, 1 July 1943 – 12 March 1944
- Chakulia Airfield, India, c. 11 April 1944 – April 1945
- West Field, Tinian, April-7 November 1945
- March Field, California, 27 November 1945
- Davis–Monthan Field, Arizona, c. 13 May-1 October 1946
- Smoky Hill Air Force Base, Kansas, 28 May 1952
- Forbes Air Force Base, Kansas, 20 June 1960 – 1 September 1964

=== Aircraft ===
- Douglas B-18 Bolo, 1941–1942
- Boeing B-17 Flying Fortress, 1942–1944
- Consolidated B-24 Liberator, 1942–1943
- Martin B-26 Marauder, 1943–1944
- Boeing YB-29 Superfortress, 1943–1944
- Boeing B-29 Superfortress, 1944–1946; 1953–1954
- Boeing B-47 Stratojet, 1954–1964
