= 40th Air Expeditionary Wing =

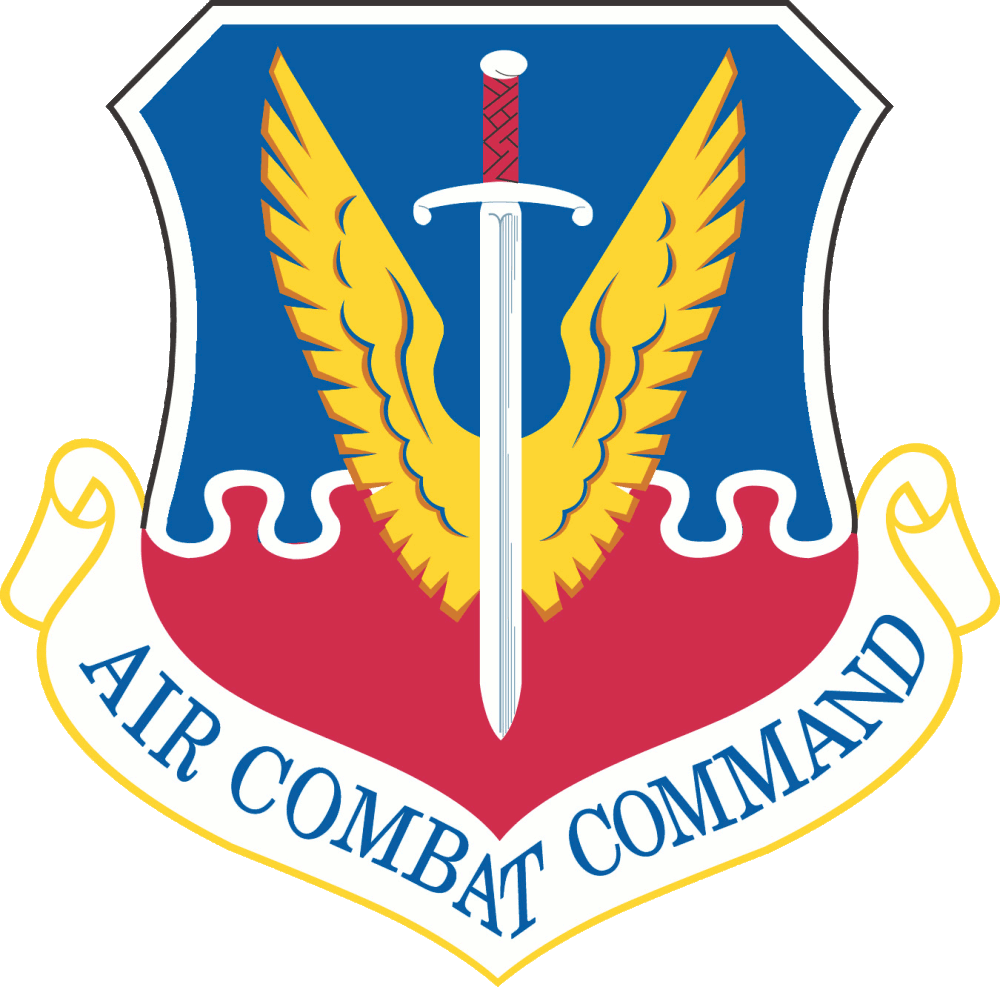
40th Air Expeditionary Wing

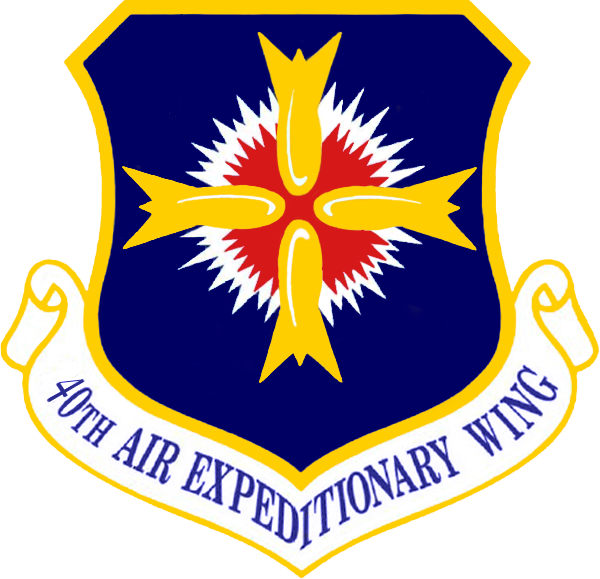
- 40th Air Expeditionary Wing emblem
- Active: 1940–1946; 1952–1954; 1966–1992; 2002–2006(?)
- Country: United States
- Branch: United States Air Force
- Part of: Air Combat Command
- Engagements: World War II; American Campaign (1941–1944) Asiatic-Pacific Campaign (1944–1945): Global War on Terrorism; Afghanistan Service (Dates TBA)

Commanders
- Notable commanders: David A. Burchinal

The United States Air Force's 40th Air Expeditionary Wing is a provisional unit assigned to Air Combat Command to activate or inactivate as needed. It was most recently located at Diego Garcia, in the Indian Ocean, from 2002 to c. 2006. The 40 AEW's mission was to support combat forces in Afghanistan and other combat areas supporting Operation Enduring Freedom. Operations began in October 2001.

Its predecessor unit, the United States Army Air Forces 40th Bombardment Group was part of Twentieth Air Force during World War II. The unit served primarily in the Pacific Ocean theater and China Burma India Theater of World War II. The 40th Bomb Group's aircraft engaged in very heavy bombardment Boeing B-29 Superfortress operations against Japan. Its aircraft were identified by Triangle "S".

The 40th Bombardment Group was one of the original ten USAAF bombardment groups assigned to Strategic Air Command (SAC) on 21 March 1946; however, it was inactivated due to budget constraints on 1 August 1946. it was rReactivated as the 40th Tactical Group, the host unit at Aviano Air Base, Italy in 1966 to provide support to Tactical Air Command deployed rotational elements until 1992.

The 40th Bombardment Wing was activated in 1952 as a SAC B-47 Stratojet organization until the phaseout of the aircraft in 1964. It was consolidated with the group in 1984.

== Second World War ==
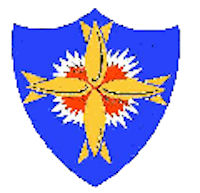

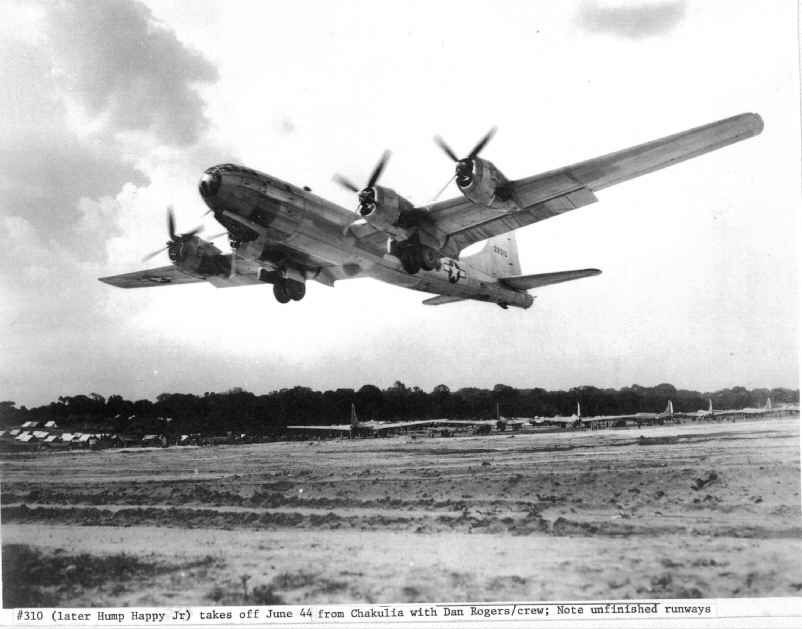
42-6310 taking off from Chakulia, India, June 1944

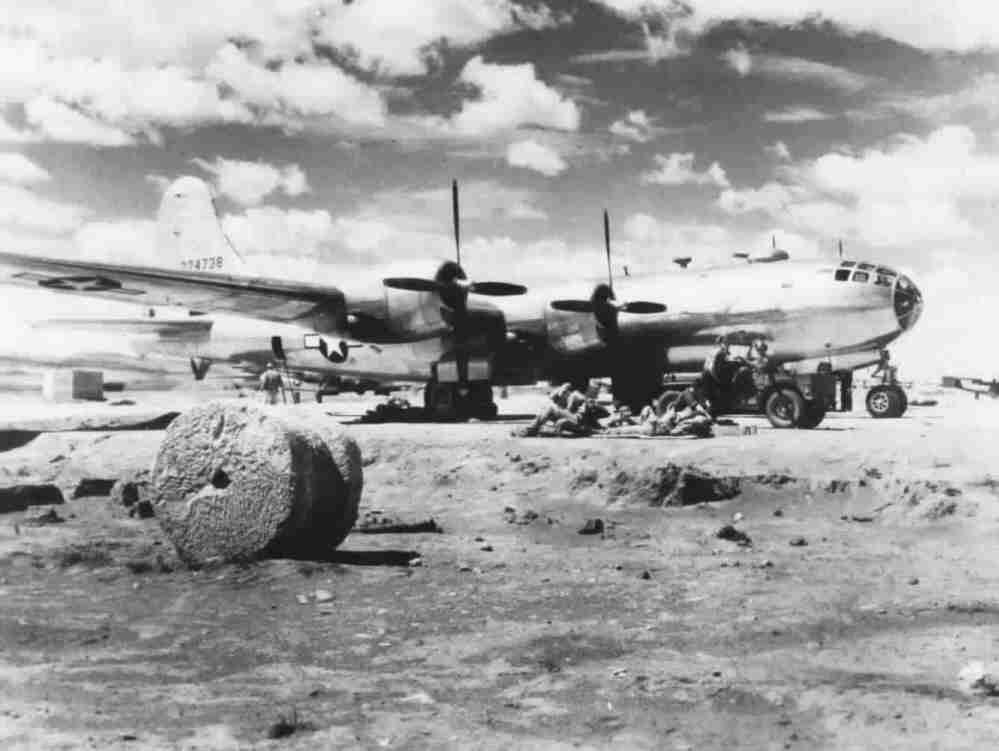
42-74738 on an unfinished airfield in China, 1944

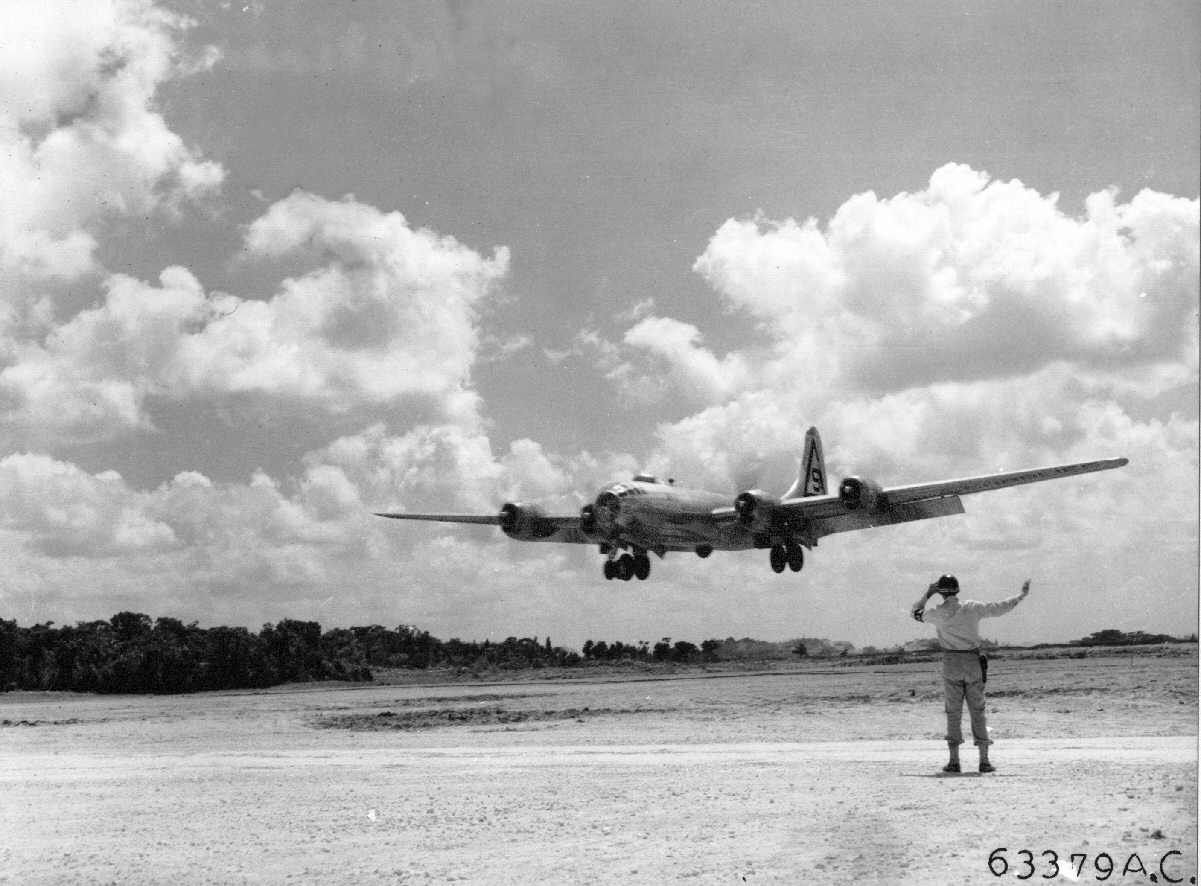
42-42795 landing on Tinian, 1945

The 40th Bombardment Group was constituted in Puerto Rico on 22 November 1940 and activated on 1 April 1941. The unit's operational squadrons (29th, 44th and 45th) were equipped with Douglas B-18 Bolos then early Boeing B-17 Flying Fortresses and Martin B-26 Marauder aircraft to train, and patrol the Caribbean area, later to provide air defense of the Panama Canal after the Japanese attack on Pearl Harbor.

With the diminished need for defenses in the Caribbean, the 40th was reassigned back to the United States and redesignated the 40th Bombardment Group (Very Heavy) in November 1943, being assigned to Pratt Army Airfield, Kansas and to the first B-29 Superfortress wing, the 58th Bombardment Wing. At Pratt, the group's squadrons (25th 44th, 45th, and 395th) began transition training on the new aircraft and its new mission.

In March 1944, the group left the United States and deployed to a former B-24 Liberator airfield at Chakulia, India. In India, the group was assigned to the XX Bombardment Command of the new Twentieth Air Force. During the week of 15–22 April, no less than five 58th Bomb Wing B-29s crashed near Karachi all from overheated engines. The entire Wing had to be grounded en route until the cause was found. The cause was traced to the fact that the B-29's R-3350 engine had not been designed to operate at ground temperatures higher than 115 °F (46 °C), which were typically exceeded in India. Modifications had also to be made to the aircraft and after these modifications, B-29 flights to India were resumed.

From India, the 40th Bomb Group planned to fly missions against Japan from airfields in China. However, all the supplies of fuel, bombs, and spares needed to support the forward bases in China had to be flown in from India over "The Hump" (the name given by Allied pilots to the eastern end of the Himalayan Mountains), since Japanese control of the seas around the Chinese coast made seaborne supply of China impossible. Many of the supplies had to be delivered to China by the B-29s themselves. For this role, they were stripped of nearly all combat equipment and used as flying tankers and each carried seven tons of fuel. The Hump route was so dangerous and difficult that each time a B-29 flew from India to China it was counted as a combat mission,

The first combat mission by the group took place on 5 June 1944 when the group's squadrons took off from India to attack the Makasan railroad yards at Bangkok, Thailand. This involved a 2261-mile round trip, the longest bombing mission yet attempted during the war.

On 15 June the group participated in the first Army Air Forces attack on the Japanese Home Islands since the Doolittle Raid in 1942 when it took part in the bombing of Yawata. Operating from bases in India, and at times staging through fields in China, the group struck such targets as transportation centers, naval installations, iron works, and aircraft plants in Burma, Thailand, China, Japan, Indonesia, and Formosa, receiving a Distinguished Unit Citation for bombing iron and steel works at Yawata, Japan, on 20 August 1944. From a staging field in Ceylon, the 40th mined waters near the port of Palembang, Sumatra, in August 1944.

The group was reassigned to Tinian, in the Marianas February–April 1945, for further operations against Japan with the XXI Bomb Command. The 40th made daylight attacks from high altitude on strategic targets, participated in incendiary raids on urban areas, and dropped mines in Japanese shipping lanes. Received a Distinguished Unit Citation for attacking naval aircraft factories at Kure, oil storage facilities at Oshima, and the industrial area of Nagoya, in May 1945. Raided light metal industries in Osaka in July 1945, being awarded another DUC for this mission.

After V-J Day, the group dropped food and supplies to Allied prisoners in Japan, Korea, and Formosa, and took part in show-of-force missions.

== Strategic Air Command ==
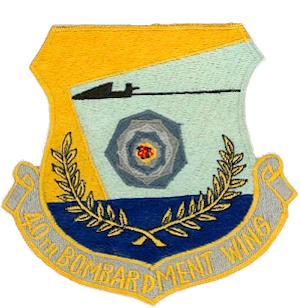
Emblem of the 40th Bombardment Wing

The group returned to the United States in November 1945, being assigned to March Field, California. It was assigned to the Fourth Air Force of Continental Air Forces. Continental Air Forces would later evolve into the Strategic Air Command on 21 March 1946.

The 40th Bombardment Group was one of the ten existing bombardment groups assigned to SAC when it was first formed. The group was relocated to Davis–Monthan Field, Arizona and had the 25th, 44th, 45th, 343d and 395th Bomb Squadrons, equipped with B-29s. Demobilization, however, was in full swing and the group turned in its aircraft and was inactivated on 1 October 1946. Many of the wing's personnel and aircraft were reassigned to the 43d Bombardment Wing, which was reactivated at Davis–Monthan on 1 October 1946 as part of the re-established Eighth Air Force.

The unit was reactivated as the 40th Bombardment Wing, Medium at Smoky Hill Air Force Base, Kansas on 28 May 1952. Although activated, it was not manned until early February 1953, when it gained personnel and equipment from the 40th Tactical and Maintenance Squadron (Provisional) established at Davis–Monthan AFB, Arizona as a holding unit for people and equipment surplus to the 303d Bombardment Wing being formed at Davis–Monthan. Once activated, the wing received control and guidance from the 310th Bombardment Wing at Smoky Hill until 1 May 1953.

The new wing was initially assigned to the 802d Air Division, Fifteenth Air Force. By October 1953, all tactical squadrons were minimally operational. Flew second-line Boeing B-29 Superfortresses in 1953–1954 which had returned from Kadena AB, Okinawa and the Korean War while becoming operational. In 1953, the wing gained KC-97 Stratofreighters and took on a refueling mission.

Replaced the propeller-driven B-29s with new B-47E Stratojet swept-wing bomber medium bombers in 1954, capable of flying at high subsonic speeds and primarily designed for penetrating the airspace of the Soviet Union and became combat ready in April 1955. Reassigned to Eighth Air Force, 802d Air Division on 1 July 1955 after becoming operationally ready with the B-47. It carried out bombardment training and air refueling operations to meet SAC's global commitments. Attached to the 7th Air Division From 9 June to 9 September 1955 while deployed to RAF Lakenheath, England. Deployed to RAF Greenham Common, England July–October 1957.

In 1959, the Department of Defense began a major renovation of Schilling AFB. During the next year, millions of dollars were spent preparing the runways and taxiways for the next generation of bombers and tankers, namely the B-52 and KC-135. The 40th Bomb Wing was reassigned to Fifteenth Air Force along with the 802d AD on 1 January 1959. With Schilling under construction, the wing was reassigned to Forbes AFB, Kansas on 20 June 1960 and the Second Air Force, 21st Air Division.

In the early 1960s, the B-47 was considered to be reaching obsolescence, and was being phased out of SAC's strategic arsenal. At Forbes, the 40th Bomb Wing gained an Atlas missile squadron in January 1964, and was redesignated the 40th Strategic Aerospace Wing on 1 February 1964. Began phasing down for inactivation with the retirement of its B-47s during the spring of 1964 and was designated as non-operational from 15 August, to 1 September 1964.

The wing was discontinued and inactivated on 1 September 1964.

== United States Air Forces in Europe ==
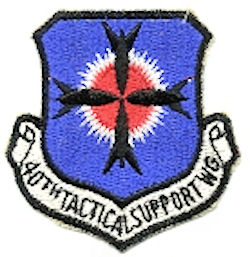
Emblem of the 40th Tactical Support Wing

On 1 April 1966, the 40th Tactical Group was activated at Aviano Air Base, Italy, and replaced the 7227th Combat Support Group to handle the Tactical Air Command rotational units from the United States deploying a permanent basis. The redesignation was part of the USAFE takeover of the base and its support functions. On 30 July 1990, the USAF redesignated the MAJCOM group the AFCON 40th Tactical Support Wing and formally consolidated the unit with the historical 40th Bombardment Wing and 40th Bombardment Group which gave the host unit at Aviano a unit with a combat lineage.

With the closure of USAF operations at Torrejon Air Base, Spain on 4 May 1992, the 401st Tactical Fighter Wing moved to Aviano AB without personnel or equipment and administratively replaced the 40th TSW, which inactivated the same day.

== Wars in Afghanistan and Iraq ==
The wing was reactivated after January 2002 as an Air Expeditionary Wing to bomb targets and provide aerial refueling during the United States invasion of Afghanistan.

Years afterwards, in 2007, Globalsecurity.org listed its flying units as including the 9th Expeditionary Air Refueling Squadron; the 28th Expeditionary Air Refueling Squadron; the 40th Expeditionary Bomb Squadron; wing support organizations included the 40th Expeditionary Logistics Group; and also reported that it parented the 60th Air Expeditionary Group; the 321st Air Expeditionary Group, for a time located at Jacobabad in Pakistan, and the 462d Air Expeditionary Group.

It is known that the 40 AEW B-52 Stratofortresses dropped about 58 percent of the munitions used during Operation Anaconda and had flown more than 80 sorties; releasing more than 2,000 bombs supporting Operation Enduring Freedom.

It is not known when the wing was inactivated or if it is still operational. However, it is known that bomber operations from Diego Garcia concluded on 15 August 2006.

== Lineage, assignments, components, stations ==
=== Lineage ===
40th Air Expeditionary Wing

- Constituted as the 40th Bombardment Group (Medium) on 22 November 1940

Activated on 1 April 1941
Redesignated 40th Bombardment Group (Heavy) on 25 May 1942
Redesignated 40th Bombardment Group, Very Heavy on 20 November 1943
Inactivated on 1 October 1946
Redesignated 40th Tactical Group and activated on 14 March 1966 (not organized)
Organized on 1 April 1966
Consolidated on 31 January 1984 with the 40th Strategic Aerospace Wing
Redesignated 40th Tactical Support Wing on 30 July 1990
Inactivated on 4 May 1992.
Redesignated 40th Air Expeditionary Wing, and converted to provisional status on 31 January 2002

40th Strategic Aerospace Wing

- Constituted as the 40th Bombardment Wing, Medium on 9 May 1952

Activated on 28 May 1952
Redesignated 40th Strategic Aerospace Wing on 1 February 1964
Discontinued and inactivated on 1 September 1964
Consolidated on 31 January 1984 with the 40th Tactical Group as the 40th Tactical Group

=== Assignments ===
- Panama Canal Air Force, 1 April 1940

13 Composite Wing,1 May 1941
VI Bomber Command, 25 October 1941

- Sixth Air Force, 13 June – 1 July 1943
- Second Air Force

II Bomber Command, 1 July 1943

- Second Air Force, 6 October 1943
- Twentieth Air Force

XX Bomber Command

58th Bombardment Wing, 19 November 1943

XX Bomber Command, 1 October – 7 November 1945

- Continental Air Forces

Fourth Air Force, 27 November 1945 – 8 May 1946

- Strategic Air Command, 21 March – 1 October 1946; 25 May 1952

Fifteenth Air Force

802d Air Division, 28 May 1952

Attached to: 310th Bombardment Wing, Medium, 6 February – 1 May 1953
Attached to: 7th Air Division, 9 June – 9 September 1955

Eighth Air Force

802d Air Division, 1 July 1955

Attached to: 7th Air Division, 1 July, – 1 October 1957

Fifteenth Air Force

802d Air Division, 1 January 1959

Second Air Force
21st Air Division, June 120, 1960 – 1 September 1964

- United States Air Forces in Europe, 1 April 1966 – 4 May 1992
- United States Central Command Air Forces, 2001–TBD

=== Bases stationed ===
- Borinquen Field, Puerto Rico, 1 April 1941
- Howard Field, Panama Canal Zone, 16 June 1942
- Albrook Field, Panama Canal Zone, 16 September 1942
- Howard Field, Panama Canal Zone, 3–15 June 1943
- Pratt Army Air Field, Kansas, 1 July 1943 – 12 March 1944
- Chakulia Airfield, India, 2 April 1944 – 25 February 1945

Hsinching Airfield (A-1), China designated as forward staging base.

- West Field, Tinian, Mariana Islands, 4 April – 7 November 1945
- March Field, California, 27 November 1945
- Davis–Monthan Field, Arizona, 8 May – 1 October 1946
- Smoky Hill Air Force Base (later Schilling Air Force Base, Kansas, 28 May 1952
- Forbes Air Force Base, Kansas, 20 June 1960 – 1 September 1964
- Diego Garcia, Indian Ocean (since 2001)

=== Components ===
==== Second World War ====
- 25th Bombardment Squadron: 12 May 1943 – 1 October 1946; 28 May 1952 – 1 September 1964 (not operational, 28 May 1952 – c. 3 April 1953 and 15 August – 1 September 1964)
- 29th Bombardment Squadron: 1 April 1941 – 12 May 1943
- 44th Bombardment Squadron: 1 April 1941 – 1 October 1946; 28 May 1952 – 1 September 1964 (not operational, 28 May 1952 – 31 May 1953 and 15 August-1 September 1964)
- 45th Bombardment Squadron: 1 April 1941 – 1 October 1946; 28 May 1952 – 1 September 1964 (not operational, 28 May 1952 – 30 September 1953 and 15 August-1 September 1964)
- 74th Bombardment Squadron: 9 August 1942 – 12 May 1943
- 343d Bombardment Squadron: 10 November 1945 – 27 March 1946
- 345th Bombardment Squadron: 10 November 1945 – 27 March 1946
- 5th Reconnaissance Squadron (Medium) (later 395th Bombardment Squadron): 25 February-9 August 1942; 12 May 1943 – 20 October 1944
- 1st Bombardment Maintenance Squadron
- 2d Bombardment Maintenance Squadron
- 3d Bombardment Maintenance Squadron
- 4th Bombardment Maintenance Squadron
- 11th Photographic Laboratory Squadron

==== United States Air Force ====
- 40th Air Refueling Squadron: 8 July 1952 – 1 June 1960 (not operational, 8 July-7 September 1952; detached 8 September 1952 – 30 April 1953, 1–10 March 1954, 4 May – 27 June 1954, 25 June-5 September 1956, c. 1 July—c. 1 October 1957, c. 1 October 1958 – 10 January 1959)
- 90th Air Refueling Squadron: 20 June 1960 – 15 November 1962
- 548th Strategic Missile Squadron: 1 January-1 September 1964 (detached 1 August-1 September 1964)
- 660th Bombardment Squadron: 1 February 1959 – 1 January 1962.

=== Aircraft and missiles operated ===
United States Army Air Forces

- Douglas B-18 Bolo
- Boeing B-17 Flying Fortress
- Boeing B-29 Superfortress
- Martin B-26 Marauder

United States Air Force

- Boeing KC-135 Stratotanker
- Boeing B-47 Stratojet
- Convair SM-65 Atlas-E Missile
- Rockwell International B-1 Lancer
- Boeing B-52 Stratofortress

== See also ==
- List of B-29 Superfortress operators
