= 60th Expeditionary Reconnaissance Squadron =

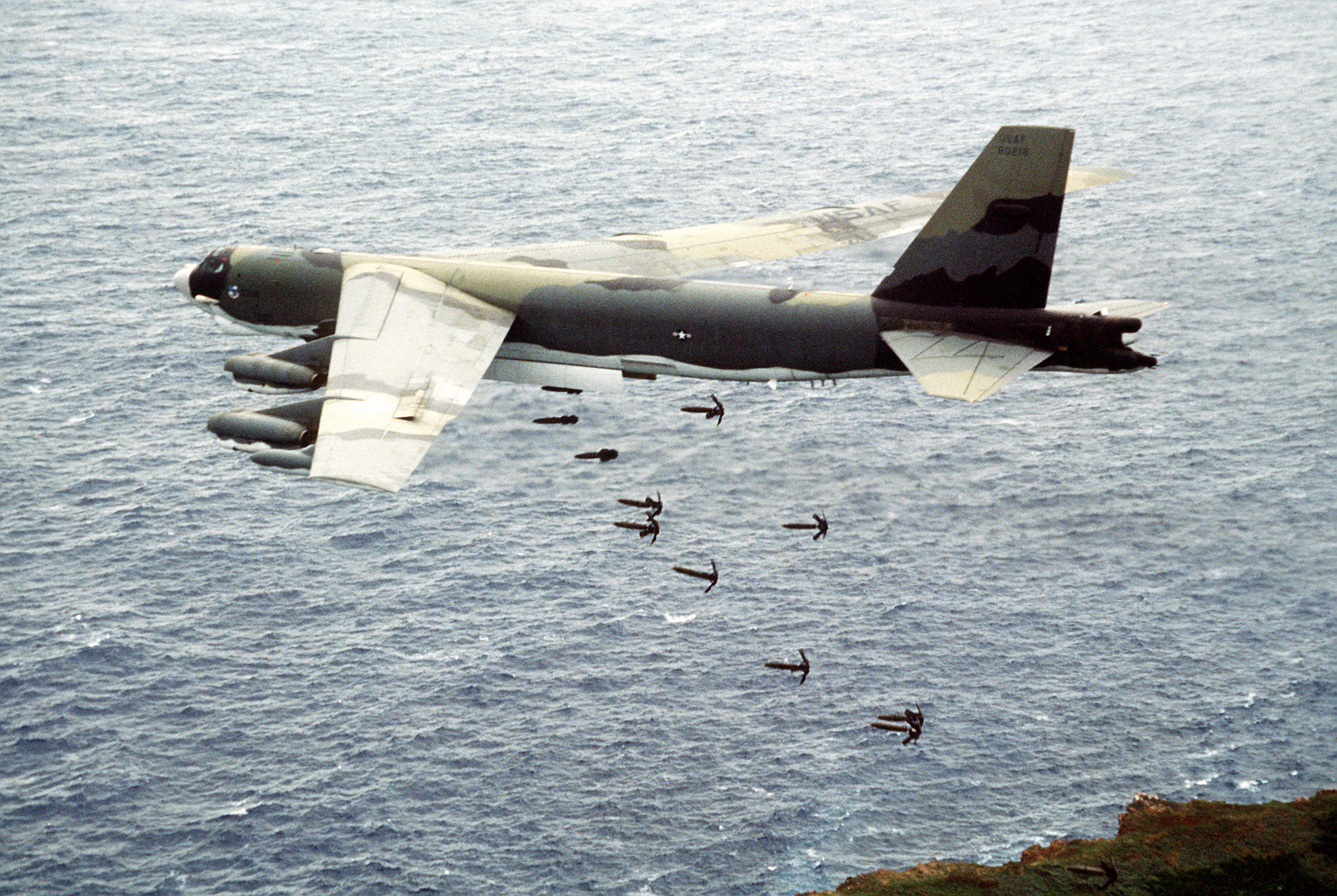
- 60th Bombardment Squadron B-52G Stratofortress dropping Mark 82 bombs
- Active: 1947–1990; unknown–2015
- Country: United States
- Branch: United States Air Force
- Role: Reconnaissance
- Part of: Air Combat Command
- Motto(s): Sic Itur Ad Astra Latin
- Engagements: Vietnam War
- Decorations: Air Force Outstanding Unit Award with Combat "V" Device; Air Force Outstanding Unit Award; Vietnam Gallantry Cross with Palm

Insignia
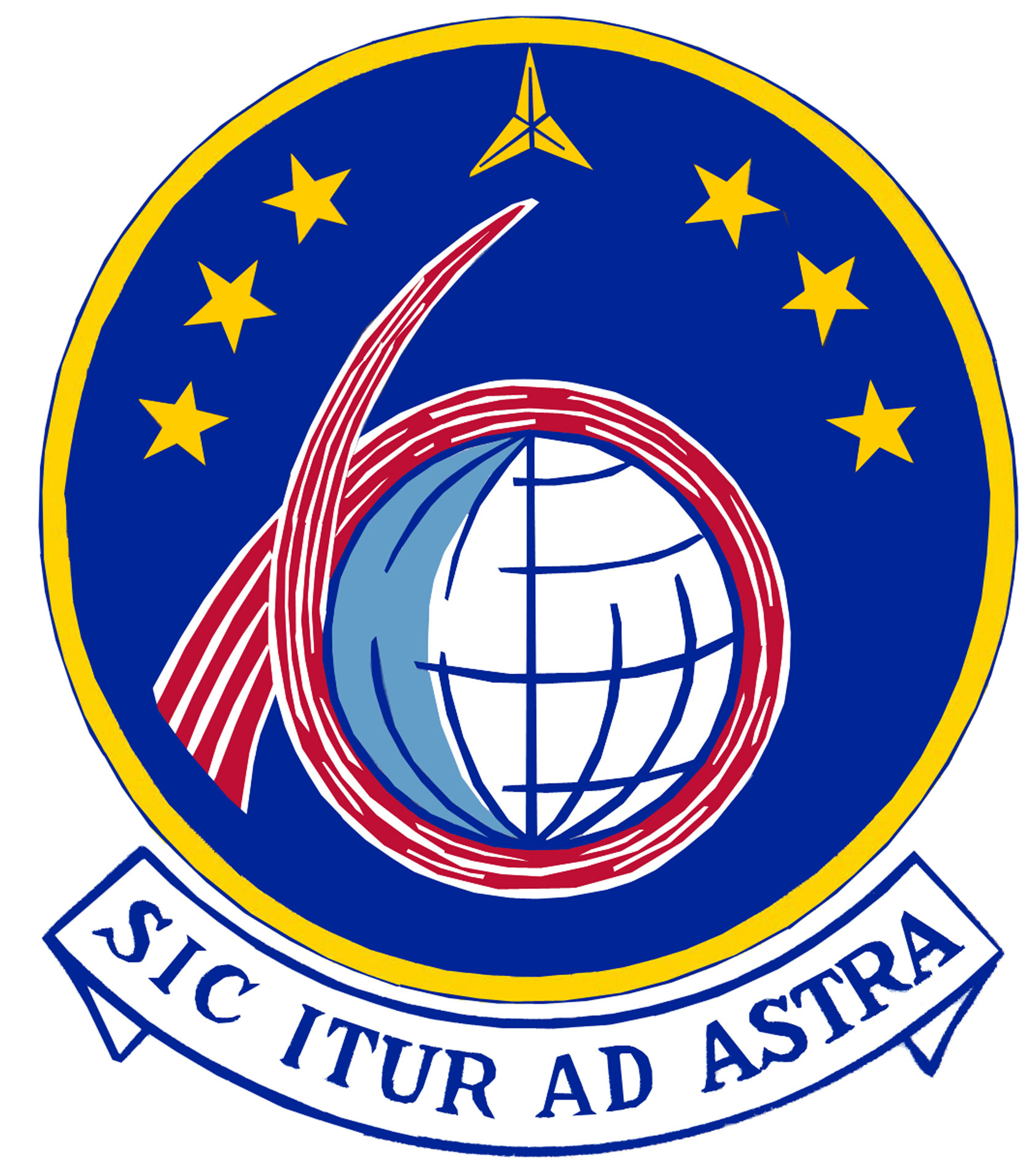
- 60th Expeditionary Reconnaissance Squadron emblem (approved 7 August 1962)

Aircraft flown
- Reconnaissance: General Atomics MQ-1 Predator, General Atomics MQ-9 Reaper

The 60th Expeditionary Reconnaissance Squadron is a provisional United States Air Force unit, assigned to Air Combat Command to activate or inactivate as needed. Its last known activation was as an unmanned aerial vehicle unit, inactivated on 7 October 2015 at Camp Lemonnier, Djibouti.

The squadron was first activated in 1947 at Hamilton Air Force Base as the 60th Reconnaissance Squadronin the reserve, but it is not clear whether it was operational before it was inactivated in 1949, when budget reductions and a reorganization of USAF reserve forces cut the number of units in the reserve.

The squadron was reactivated as a Strategic Air Command unit in 1952 at Ramey Air Force Base, Puerto Rico and equipped with Convair RB-36 Peacemakers. In 1955, its mission changed to strategic bombardment and it became the 60th Bombardment Squadron. In 1958, it replaced B-36s with Boeing B-52 Stratofortresses. The squadron moved to Andersen Air Force Base, Guam, when Ramey was transferred to Military Airlift Command and was inactivated at Anderson on 30 April 1990. It was converted to provisional status and received its current name in July 2010.

== History ==
=== Air Force reserve ===
The squadron was first activated in July 1947 as the 60th Reconnaissance Squadron, a reserve unit assigned to the 72d Reconnaissance Group at Hamilton Field, California. The squadron's training was supervised by the 415th Army Air Forces Base Unit (later the 2346th Air Force Reserve Training Center), an Air Defense Command (ADC) regular unit. It is not clear whether or not the squadron was fully staffed or equipped. In 1948 Continental Air Command assumed responsibility for training reserve and Air National Guard units from ADC. The 60th was inactivated when Continental Air Command reorganized its reserve units under the wing base organization system in June 1949. At the same time, President Truman's reduced 1949 defense budget required reductions in the number of units in the Air Force, and the 60th was inactivated. The squadron's personnel and equipment were transferred to elements of the 349th Troop Carrier Wing.

=== Strategic reconnaissance ===
Reactivated in 1952 as a Strategic Air Command Convair RB-36 Peacemaker strategic reconnaissance squadron; flew very long range intelligence gathering missions until 1959 when it became a Boeing B-52G Stratofortress heavy bomber squadron.

=== Long range bombardment operations ===
Stood nuclear alert between 1959–1971 with the B-52G, was equipped with the AGM-28 Hound Dog cruise missile. Squadron moved to Andersen Air Force Base, Guam in 1971 when Ramey Air Force Base was transferred to Military Airlift Command and reassigned to the 43d wing and re-equipped with the B-52D, configured for conventional bombing. From Andersen AFB, the squadron engaged in combat operations over Indochina flying Arc Light, Linebacker I and Linebacker II bombing missions over North Vietnam until 1973.

Squadron remained on alert after the Vietnam War on Guam; re-equipped with B-52Gs in 1983. Remained on alert throughout the balance of the Cold War, inactivating in 1990 and the cessation of permanent aircraft stationing on Guam. Redesignated as the 60th Expeditionary Reconnaissance Squadron, and converted to provisional status, on 22 July 2010.

=== Expeditionary operations ===
The 60th was converted to an expeditionary unit and returned to a modern version of its original mission as the 60th Expeditionary Reconnaissance Squadron in July 2010. Although its activation date is not known, it was inactivated on 7 October 2015 at Camp Lemonnier, Djibouti, according to an announcement by the 380th Air Expeditionary Wing.

Squadron flight operations began at Camp Lemonnier, but moved to Chabelley Airport, which is about seven miles from the main part of Camp Lemonnier, in 2013. Drone operations were moved from Dhibouti's civilian airport next to the camp following a series of crashes of unmanned aerial vehicles that had been flying from the airport starting as early as 2010. UAVs operating from Chabelly had "neutralized" nearly 70 enemy fighters, including five "high value" individuals. It was not clear if the squadron's inactivation marked the end of UAV operations in the Horn of Africa, or if another unit assumed the mission from the 60th.

== Lineage ==
- Constituted as the 60th Reconnaissance Squadron, Weather Scouting on 13 May 1947

Activated in the reserve on 12 July 1947
Inactivated on 27 June 1949

- Redesignated 60th Strategic Reconnaissance Squadron, Heavy on 4 June 1952

Activated on 16 June 1952
Redesignated 60th Bombardment Squadron, Heavy on 1 October 1955
Inactivated on 30 April 1990

- Redesignated 60th Expeditionary Reconnaissance Squadron and converted to provisional status, on 22 July 2010

Activated Unknown
Inactivated 7 October 2015

=== Assignments ===
- 72d Reconnaissance Group, 12 July 1947 – 27 June 1949
- 72d Strategic Reconnaissance Wing (later 72d Bombardment Wing), 16 June 1952
- 43d Strategic Wing (later 43d Bombardment Wing), 30 June 1971 – 30 April 1990
- Air Combat Command to activate or inactivate at any time on or after 22 July 2010

Unknown to 7 Oct 2015

=== Stations ===
- Hamilton Field (later Hamilton Air Force Base), California, 12 July 1947 – 27 Jun 1949
- Ramey Air Force Base, Puerto Rico, 16 June 1952
- Andersen Air Force Base, Guam, 30 Jun 1971 – 30 April 1990
- Camp Lemonnier, Djibouti, 2013
- Chabelley Airport, Djibouti, c. September 2013 – 7 October 2015

=== Aircraft ===
- Unknown, 1947–1949
- Convair RB-36 Peacemaker, 1952–1955
- Convair B-36 Peacemaker, 1955–1958
- Boeing B-52 Stratofortress, 1959–1971, 1972–1990
- General Atomics MQ-1B Predator, 2013–2015
- General Atomics MQ-9A Reaper, 2013–2015

== See also ==
- List of B-52 Units of the United States Air Force
