= David A. Burchinal =

United States Air Force general

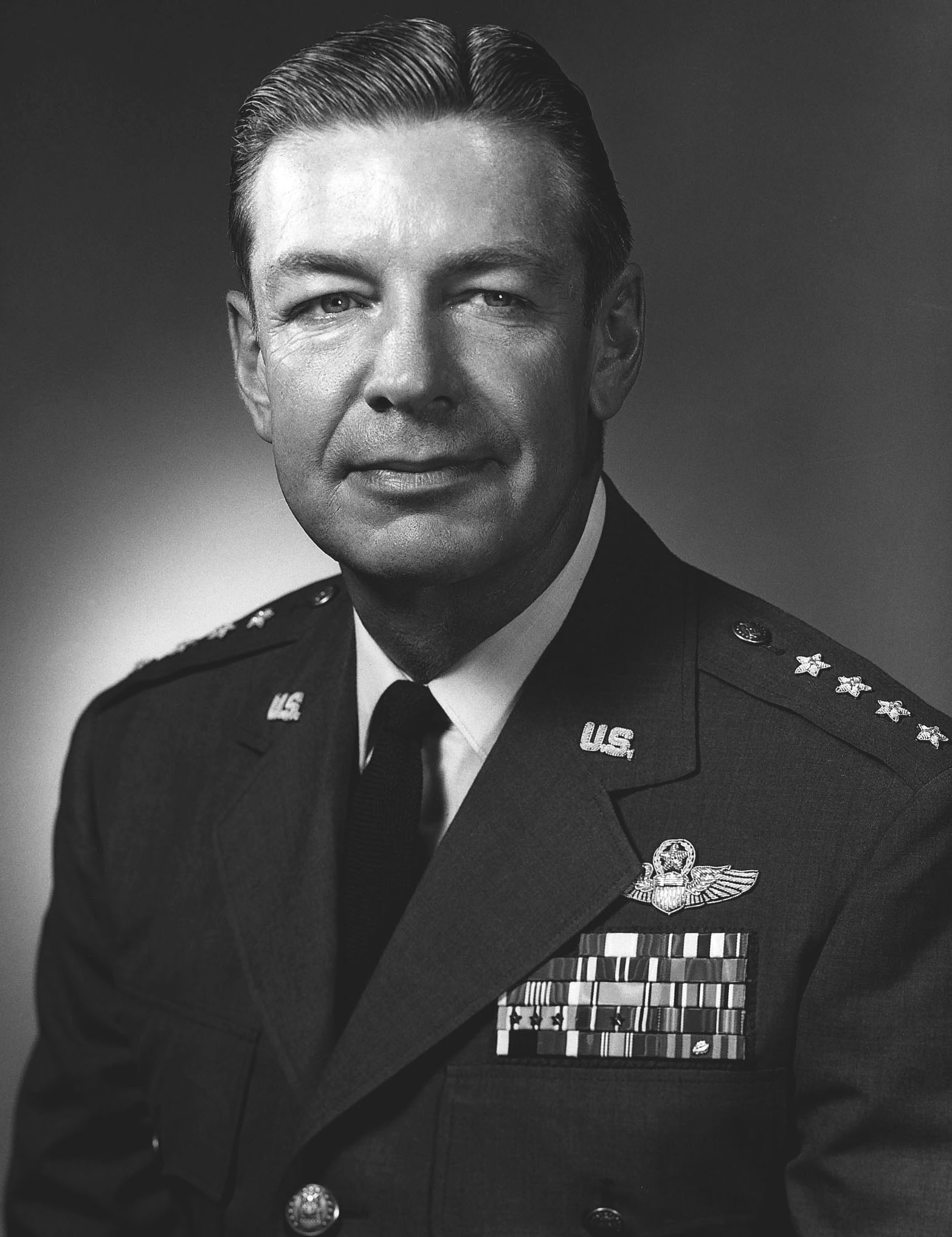
- General David A. Burchinal
- Born: April 17, 1915; Washington, Pennsylvania
- Died: August 17, 1990 (aged 75); Middletown, Pennsylvania
- Military career
- Allegiance: United States
- Branch: United States Air Force
- Service years: 1939–1973
- Rank: General
- Commands: United States European Command; 43d Bombardment Wing; 40th Bombardment Wing
- Conflicts: World War II; Korean War
- Awards: Air Force Distinguished Service Medal (2); Silver Star; Legion of Merit (2); Distinguished Flying Cross

David Arthur Burchinal (April 17, 1915 – August 17, 1990) was a United States Air Force four-star general who served as Deputy Commander in Chief, United States European Command from 1966 to 1973.

== Early life ==
Burchinal was born in Washington, Pennsylvania, on April 17, 1915. He received his Bachelor of Arts degree in 1938 from Brown University in Providence, Rhode Island, where he was elected a member of Phi Beta Kappa. He entered pilot training at Randolph Field, Texas, in June 1939, and graduated in 1940 with a commission as second lieutenant and his pilot wings. In June 1965 he was awarded an honorary doctorate of laws degree by Brown University. In August 1968 Burchinal was presented an honorary Doctor of Laws degree from the University of Utah at England's University of Cambridge.

== Military career ==
Burchinal's first military assignment was as an observer of army field exercises at Fort Benning, Georgia. He then became an instructor at Brooks Field, Texas. From May 2, 1940, until July 28, 1941, Burchinal served successively as an engineering officer, transport pilot, test pilot, and assistant adjutant at the San Antonio Air Depot, Duncan Field, Texas.

Burchinal then assumed duties as aide to the commanding general of the Air Service Command at Patterson Field, Ohio, in Washington, D.C., and in London, England. In February 1943 Burchinal became operations officer and later, deputy commander for the 330th Bombardment Group at Alamogordo, New Mexico, and Biggs Field, Texas.

Remaining at Biggs Field, Burchinal was reassigned in July 1943 to the XX Bomber Command as assistant A-3 for the 16th Bombardment Operations Training Wing. He was on this job only six months when, in December 1943, he was named military air attaché at Ottawa, Canada. Culminating six months of attaché duty, Burchinal returned to the United States in June 1944 for duties as Wing A-3 at Headquarters 313th Bombardment Wing, Peterson Field, Colorado.

Six months later Burchinal was en route to the Pacific area as A-3 for-the 313th Bombardment Wing based on Tinian. He later became deputy chief of staff for operations of the wing and in March 1945, became deputy A-3 Headquarters XXI Bomber Command on Guam in the Marianas Islands. In September 1945 Burchinal became A-3 for the Twentieth Air Force and, in November the same year, assumed duties as military analyst, United States Strategic Bombing Survey in Tokyo, Japan. One month later he returned to the United States.

Burchinal stayed with the War Department in Washington, D.C., until June 1946, working as research analyst, United States Strategic Bombing Survey, and then moved to Maxwell Field, Alabama, as student and instructor on the first faculty of the Air War College. He later became assistant chief of the air strategy division in the Air War College, a job he held until called back to Washington, D.C., in March 1949.

Upon his return to Washington, D.C., Burchinal became chief of the Program Analysis Division in the Directorate of Program Standards and Cost Control in the Office of the Comptroller, Headquarters United States Air Force. In April 1951 he was transferred to the Air Force Council, also in Washington, D.C., as the first secretary of the unit.

Two years later, in May 1953, Burchinal went to Smoky Hill Air Force Base, Kansas, as commander of the 40th Bombardment Wing. In January 1954 he moved to Davis-Monthan Air Force Base, Arizona, as commander of the 43d Bombardment Wing. In August 1955 Burchinal became chief of staff for Headquarters Eighth Air Force, Strategic Air Command, Westover Air Force Base, Massachusetts.

In November 1958 Burchinal returned to Washington, D.C., as deputy director, J-3 (operations), for the Joint Staff in the Organization of the Joint Chiefs of Staff. He was transferred to Headquarters United States Air Force and was assigned to the Office of the Deputy Chief of Staff, Plans and Programs, as deputy director of plans in September 1960, advanced to the director of plans in January 1961, and became deputy chief of staff for plans and programs in August 1962. He held this position, which was later redesignated deputy chief of staff for plans and operations, until February 1964. He then became director of the Joint Staff, Organization of the Joint Chiefs of Staff.

Burchinal assumed duties as deputy commander in chief, United States European Command in July 1966 and served in that capacity until he retired from the air force on March 1, 1973. He died of cancer on August 17, 1990.

== Awards and decorations ==
Burchinal's awards and decorations included the Air Force Distinguished Service Medal with oak leaf cluster, Silver Star, Legion of Merit with oak leaf cluster, Distinguished Flying Cross, Air Medal, and the Army Commendation Medal, with two oak leaf clusters.

== Effective dates of promotion ==
| Insignia | Rank | Date |
|---|---|---|
| | General | July 31, 1966 |
| | Lieutenant general | August 1, 1962 |
| | Major general | August 1, 1959 |
| | Brigadier general | December 13, 1955 |
| | Colonel | April 5, 1945 |
| | Lieutenant colonel | September 11, 1943 |
| | Major | August 4, 1942 |
| | Captain | March 30, 1942 |
| | First lieutenant | November 2, 1941 |
| | Second lieutenant | March 23, 1940 |
