= 310th Air Refueling Squadron =

US Air Force unit

310th Air Refueling Squadron (later 310th Expeditionary Air Refueling Flight)
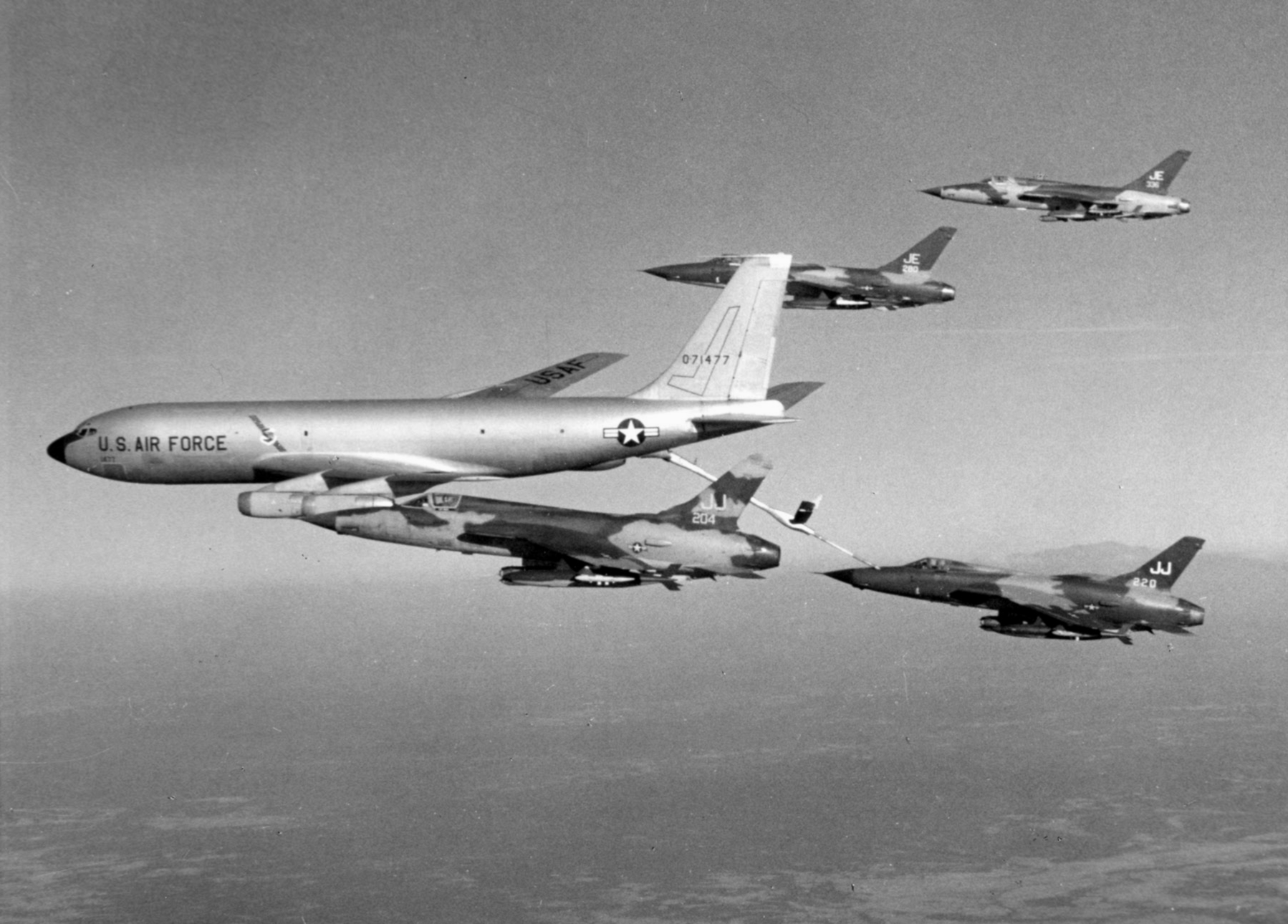
- A deployed KC-135A refueling fighters on a strike against North Vietnam
- Active: 1943–1944; 1952–1994
- Country: United States
- Branch: United States Air Force
- Part of: Air Mobility Command
- Motto: When – Where – How Much
- Decorations: Air Force Outstanding Unit Award

Insignia
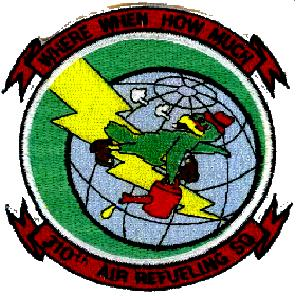
- Patch with 310th Expeditionary Air Refueling Flight Emblem (Note: Approved 8 August 1956.)

The 310th Expeditionary Air Refueling Flight is a provisional United States Air Force unit. The flight was last active as the 310th Air Refueling Squadron in October 1994, when it was assigned to the 380th Air Refueling Wing at Plattsburgh Air Force Base.

The first predecessor of the flight is the 610th Bombardment Squadron, which served from 1943 to 1944 as an Operational Training Unit, preparing other heavy bomber units for combat, then as a Replacement Training Unit, training aircrews for Consolidated B-24 Liberator aircraft.

The flight's second predecessor, the 310th Air Refueling Squadron was activated in the fall of 1952 and equipped with Boeing KC-97 Stratofreighters. The squadron's tankers frequently deployed to England and Newfoundland to support Strategic Air Command's Boeing B-47 Stratojet force. In 1964, the squadron converted to the Boeing KC-135 Stratotanker and supported Boeing B-52 Stratofortress, then General Dynamics FB-111s. During the Vietnam War, the squadron deployed crews and aircraft to support combat operations. The two squadrons were consolidated in 1985. The unit continued to support USAF operations until it was inactivated in 1994. In 2004, it was converted to provisional status as the 310th Expeditionary Air Refueling Flight.

== History ==
=== World War II ===
The first predecessor of the flight, the 610th Bombardment Squadron, was activated at Pyote Army Air Base, Texas on 1 March 1943 as one of the original four squadrons of the 400th Bombardment Group. The squadron's cadre was training at Orlando Army Air Base, Florida until about 2 May 1943 and few personnel were located with the squadron at Pyote or at Davis–Monthan Field, Arizona. Once its cadre had returned from Orlando, the squadron moved to Pueblo Army Air Base, Colorado and began training with Consolidated B-24 Liberators, moving to Smoky Hill Army Air Field, at the end of July to continue aircrew training.

The squadron became an Operational Training Unit (OTU) and moved to Alamogordo Army Air Field, New Mexico in September 1943. The OTU program involved the use of an oversized parent unit to provide cadres to "satellite groups." With most Army Air Forces (AAF) heavy bomber units activated, the squadron changed its mission and became a Replacement Training Unit (RTU) in December 1943 and moved to Charleston Army Air Field, South Carolina. Like OTUs, RTUs were oversized units, but their mission was to train individual pilots or aircrews.

However, the AAF was finding that standard military units, based on relatively inflexible tables of organization were proving poorly adapted to the training mission. Accordingly, in the spring of 1944, it adopted a more functional system in which each base was organized into a separate numbered unit. As a result of this reorganization, the 610th, along with the remaining elements of the 400th Group, was disbanded on 10 April 1944 and its mission, personnel and aircraft were transferred to the 113th AAF Base Unit (Bombardment, Heavy).

=== Air refueling operations ===
==== Strategic Air Command KC-97 operations ====
The second predecessor of the flight is the 310th Air Refueling Squadron, which was activated on 8 October 1952 at Smoky Hill Air Force Base, Kansas as part of the 310th Bombardment Wing. It was not until January 1953, however, that the squadron received its first Boeing KC-97 Stratofreighters. Although the squadron focused on refueling the Boeing B-29 Superfortresses, and after 1954, the Boeing B-47 Stratojets of its parent 310th Wing, it provided air refueling support with for Strategic Air Command (SAC) bombers through the 1950s and early 1960s.

The squadron deployed with its parent 310th Wing to England on two occasions. The first was to RAF Upper Heyford from March to June 1955 and the second to RAF Greenham Common from October 1956 to January 1957. During deployments with the 310th Wing, the squadron's aircraft also served as transports, carrying extra air crew, support personnel, and spare parts.

Later, the squadron made deployments with its KC-97s to forward locations, placing it ahead of the faster Stratojets it would refuel, and on their programmed route. The squadron deployed to England on detached duty at RAF East Kirkby from November until December 1957. SAC also deployed the squadron to Ernest Harmon Air Force Base, Newfoundland from 1 to 28 March 1954 and 28 December 1955 to 28 February 1956 and to Goose Air Base, Newfoundland from 25 March to 8 July 1958 to provide air refueling support in the North Atlantic area. The squadron began to phase out its KC-97s in October 1961, losing its final airplane in November 1963, when it became non-operational.

During the Cuban Missile Crisis, SAC assumed DEFCON 3 status on 23 October, The 310th Wing dispersed a portion of its aircraft to other bases to reduce their vulnerability. By November, SAC had returned to its normal readiness status.

==== Conversion to KC-135s ====
Unlike most refueling squadrons assigned to B-47 wings, the squadron began to convert to the Boeing KC-135 Stratotanker while still assigned to the 310th Wing. It received its first KC-135 on 3 March 1964 and had a full complement of jet tankers and combat ready aircrews by June. In April 1965, as the 310th Wing was preparing for inactivation as the B-47 left the SAC inventory, the squadron moved to Walker Air Force Base, New Mexico, where it was attached to the 6th Strategic Aerospace Wing, which flew Boeing B-52 Stratofortresses. When the 310th Wing inactivated in June, the attachment to the 6th Wing became a reassignment. The squadron began to deploy crews and tankers to Southeast Asia to refuel combat aircraft and also regularly refueled tactical aircraft deploying to the Pacific and Southeast Asia. At home station, it maintained half of its aircraft on ground alert status, fully fueled and ready to take off. The squadron's stay at Walker was brief, however, as that base closed in 1967, after Robert S. McNamara, Secretary of Defense directed a phaseout program that reduced SAC's bomber force, retiring older B-52 models.

On 25 January 1967, the squadron moved to Plattsburgh Air Force Base, New York, where it was assigned to the 380th Strategic Aerospace Wing, another B-52 unit. From Plattsburgh, the squadron supported tanker task forces in Europe and Alaska and made with temporary deployments of planes and crews to operational theaters. In October 1973, it deployed aircraft and crews to Lajes Field in the Azores, to refuel Lockheed C-141 Starlifters and Lockheed C-5 Galaxys transporting war materiel to Israel during Yom Kippur War. Missions supporting combat in Southeast Asia ended in 1976, but the squadron deployed crews and aircraft as part of tanker task forces in the Pacific area.

The 380th Wing bomber force converted to the General Dynamics FB-111 in 1971. The squadron supported the new bomber, and participated in SAC and USAF exercises worldwide. In 1985, the Air Force consolidated the 310th with the World War II 610th Bombardment Squadron. The consolidated squadron refueled aircraft of all major commands, the Air National Guard, Air Force Reserve, and other military services until it was inactivated on 1 October 1994.

== Lineage ==
610th Bombardment Squadron

- Constituted as the 610th Bombardment Squadron (Heavy) on 15 February 1943

Activated on 1 March 1943

- Disbanded on 10 April 1944
- Reconstituted on 19 September 1985 and consolidated with the 310th Air Refueling Squadron as the 310th Air Refueling Squadron

310th Expeditionary Air Refueling Flight

- Constituted as the 310th Air Refueling Squadron, Medium on 20 August 1952

Activated on 8 October 1952
Redesignated 310th Air Refueling Squadron, Heavy on 1 November 1963

- Consolidated with the 610th Bombardment Squadron on 19 September 1985

Redesignated 310th Air Refueling Squadron on 1 September 1991
Inactivated on 1 October 1994

- Redesignated 310th Expeditionary Air Refueling Flight and converted to provisional status on 29 September 2004

=== Assignments ===
- 400th Bombardment Group: 1 March 1943 – 10 April 1944
- 310th Bombardment Wing (later 310th Strategic Aerospace Wing): 8 October 1952 (attached to 802d Air Division, 1–28 March 1954, Eighth Air Force, 28 December 1955 – 5 February 1956, 25 November–10 December 1957, 25 March–8 July 1958, 6th Strategic Aerospace Wing after 15 April 1965)
- 6th Strategic Aerospace Wing: 25 June 1965
- 380th Strategic Aerospace Wing (later 380th Bombardment Wing, 380th Air Refueling Wing), 25 January 1967
- 380th Operations Group: 1 September 1991 – 1 October 1994

=== Stations ===
- Pyote Army Air Base, Texas, 1 March 1943
- Davis–Monthan Field, Arizona, 11 April 1943
- Pueblo Army Air Base, Colorado, ca. 2 May 1943
- Smoky Hill Army Air Field, Kansas, 31 July 1943
- Alamogordo Army Air Field, New Mexico, 19 September 1943
- Charleston Army Air Base, South Carolina, 15 December 1943 – 10 April 1944
- Smoky Hill Air Force Base (later Schilling Air Force Base), Kansas, 8 October 1952 (deployed to Ernest Harmon Air Force Base, Newfoundland, 1–28 March 1954, 28 December 1955 – 28 February 1956; RAF Brize Norton, England, 10 March–8 June 1955; RAF Upper Heyford, Enblend, 3 October 1956 – 9 January 1957; RAF East Kirkby, England, 25 November–10 December 1957; Goose Air Base, Newfoundland, 25 March–8 July 1958)
- Walker Air Force Base, New Mexico, 25 June 1965 (deployed from 15 April 1965)
- Plattsburgh Air Force Base, New York, 25 January 1967 – 1 October 1994

=== Aircraft ===
- Consolidated B-24 Liberator, 1943–1944
- Boeing KC-97F Stratotanker, 1953–1962
- Boeing KC-97G Stratotanker, 1953–1963
- Boeing KC-135 Stratotanker, 1963–1995

=== Awards and campaigns ===
Award streamer	Award	Dates	Notes
	Air Force Outstanding Unit Award	1 January 1956-1 January 1959	310th Air Refueling Squadron
	Air Force Outstanding Unit Award	1 January 1958-31 May 1959	310th Air Refueling Squadron
	Air Force Outstanding Unit Award	1 July 1974-30 June 1975	310th Air Refueling Squadron
	Air Force Outstanding Unit Award	1 July 1979-30 June 1980	310th Air Refueling Squadron
	Air Force Outstanding Unit Award	1 July 1980-30 June 1981	310th Air Refueling Squadron
	Air Force Outstanding Unit Award	1 July 1983-30 June 1985	310th Air Refueling Squadron
	Air Force Outstanding Unit Award	1 July 1986-30 June 1988	310th Air Refueling Squadron

Campaign Streamer	Campaign	Dates	Notes
	American Theater without inscription	1 March 1943 – 10 April 1944	610th Bombardment Squadron

== See also ==
- List of United States Air Force air refueling squadrons
- B-24 Liberator units of the United States Army Air Forces
