= 43rd Airlift Wing =

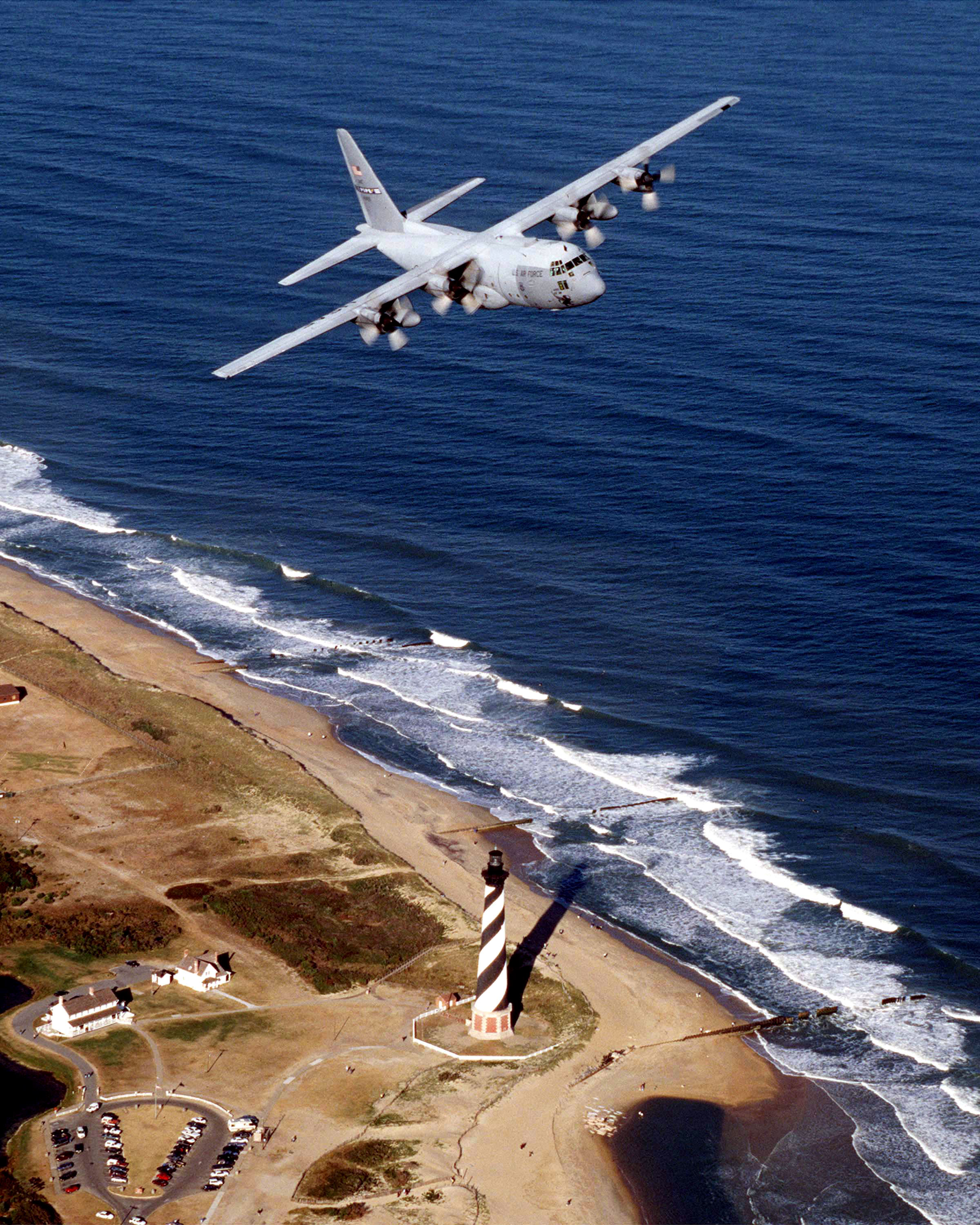
- A 43rd Operations Group C-130 flies over the Cape Hatteras lighthouse along the North Carolina coast
- Active: 1947-1970; 1970-1990; 1992-1996; 1997-2011
- Country: United States
- Branch: United States Air Force
- Role: Airlift
- Mottos: Willing, Able, Ready
- Decorations: Air Force Outstanding Unit Award with V Device; Republic of Vietnam Gallantry Cross with Palm

Commanders
- Notable commanders: David A. Burchinal; Jack J. Catton

Insignia
- 43rd Airlift Wing emblem (Note: Approved 18 November 1993.)

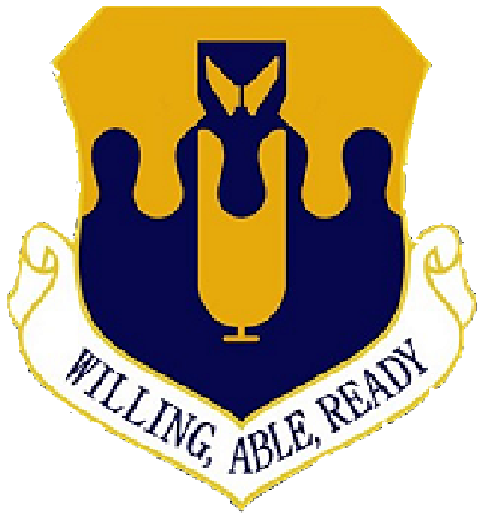
- 43rd Bombardment Wing emblem (Note: Approved 14 May 1968.)

The 43rd Airlift Wing is an inactive United States Air Force unit last stationed at Pope Army Airfield, part of Fort Bragg, North Carolina, where it was inactivated in March 2011. The wing performed en route operations support at Pope to include mission command & control, aircrew management, aircraft maintenance, aircraft loading, aircraft fueling and supply. Since the wing's inactivation, the 43rd Air Mobility Operations Group has carried out airlift, maintenance, and base support at Pope.

The wing provided strategic, enroute airlift support and Lockheed C-130 Hercules tactical airlift support to the Army's XVIII Airborne Corps and 82nd Airborne Division.

Active for over 60 years, the wing was a component wing of Strategic Air Command's deterrent force throughout the Cold War.

== History ==
=== Cold War ===
==== Operations at Davis-Monthan Air Force Base ====
On 17 November 1947, the 43rd Bombardment Wing, Very Heavy was organized at Davis-Monthan Field, Arizona as part of the United States Air Force's wing base reorganization, in which combat groups and all supporting units on a base were assigned to a single wing. The 43rd Bombardment Group, flying Boeing B-29 Superfortresses became its operational component. When the wing base organization was made permanent in 1948, the wing was redesignated as the 43rd Bombardment Wing, Medium on 1 August.

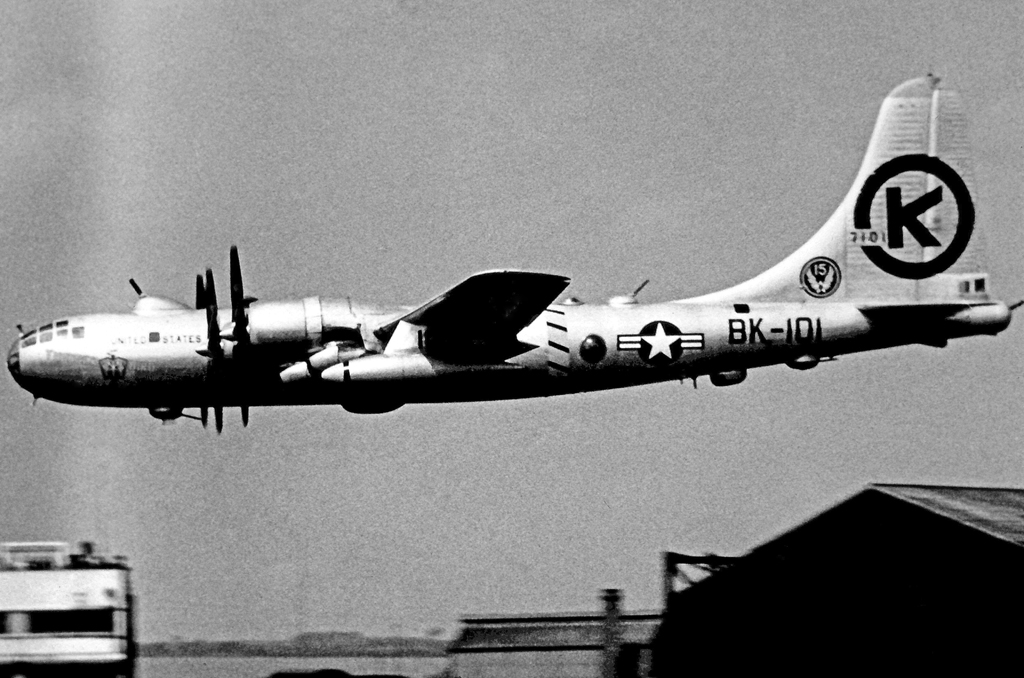
A 43rd Bombardment Wing Boeing B-50D on rotation to England 1953

On 20 February 1948, a wing crew picked up a Boeing B-50 Superfortress at the factory, and the wing became the first in SAC to fly the B-50, with regular deliveries beginning in June. However, due to maintenance and supply problems, the wing did not achieve operational capability until 1949, despite the fact that it was one of the few units in the Air Force that was authorized manning at wartime levels due to its nuclear-bombing mission. These deficiencies were demonstrated in November when the wing deployed four B-50s to Alaska. One of the planes crashed, and, the others were grounded pending the results of the aircraft investigation.

On 2 March 1949, a wing B-50A, the Lucky Lady II, (Note: Lucky Lady II carried Air Force Serial Number 46-10.) commanded by Capt. James Gallagher, completed the first nonstop, around-the-world flight. The flight departed from and ended at Carswell Air Force Base, Texas. Boeing KB-29s of the wing's 43rd Air Refueling Squadron refueled the Lucky Lady II four times on this mission. The mission received both the Mackay Trophy from the National Aeronautical Association and the Vandenberg Trophy from the Air Force Association for this mission. (Note: At the time, the Vandenberg Trophy was known as the Air Age Trophy. Both awards were made annually.)

The wing conducted strategic-bombardment training from 1946 to 1960, and air refueling from 1949 to 1960, to meet Strategic Air Command's (SAC) global commitments.

Replaced the propeller-driven B-29s and B-50s with new Boeing B-47E Stratojet swept-wing medium bombers in 1954, capable of flying at high subsonic speeds, primarily designed for penetrating the airspace of the Soviet Union. The 43rd set a new, jet endurance record in 1954 by keeping a B-47 airborne for 47:35 hours. Flew numerous training missions and participated in various SAC exercises and deployments with the Stratojet during the 1950s. In the late 1950s, the B-47 was considered to be reaching obsolescence, and was being phased out of SAC's strategic arsenal. The 43rd began reassigning its Stratojets to other wings as replacement aircraft beginning in 1959.

==== Hustler operations at Carswell Air Force Base ====
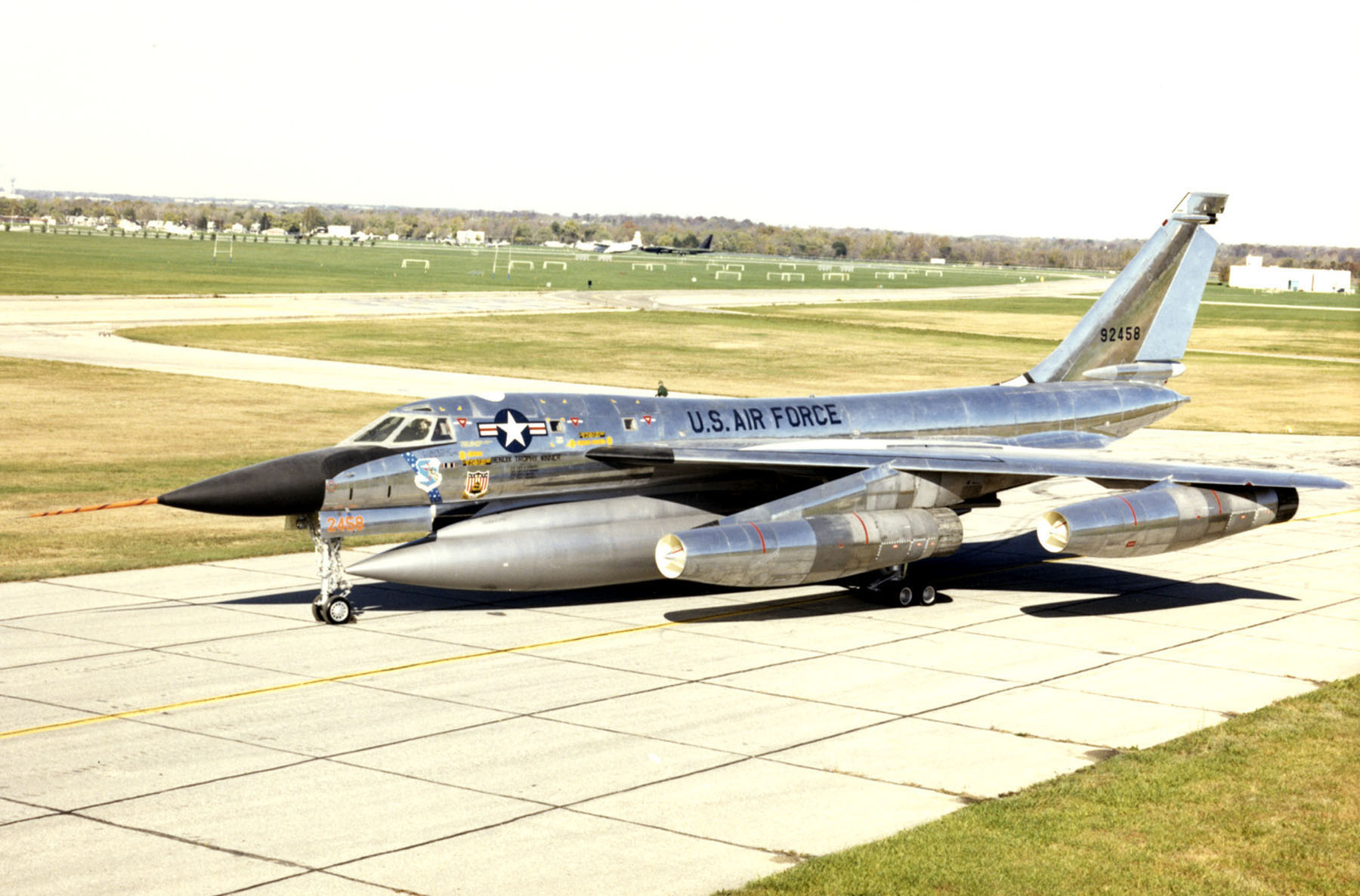
Convair B-58A Hustler (59-2458), formerly of the 43rd Bombardment Wing (Note: Shown at its permanent location at the National Museum of the United States Air Force at Wright-Patterson Air Force Base, Ohio. While assigned to the 43rd, this aircraft set a transcontinental speed record by flying nonstop from Los Angeles to New York and back again. The first leg was at an average speed of 1214.71 mph; the return leg was at an average speed of 1081.77 mph. The return leg was the first transcontinental flight that moved across the country faster than the rotational speed of the earth.)

The 43rd Bombardment Wing moved to Carswell Air Force Base without personnel or equipment on 15 April 1960. At Carswell, it was manned and equipped from the 3958th Operational Test and Evaluation Group and the 6592nd Test Squadron of Air Research and Development Command, which were discontinued.

The wing immediately began training crews on the Convair B-58 Hustler, the world's first supersonic bomber, and, it began participating in Category III testing (operational testing) of the Hustler in August. The 43rd was the first USAF B-58 wing.

Aircraft number 59-2436, the first fully operational Hustler equipped with all tactical systems, was delivered to the 43rd on 15 March. On 23 March a test-unit B-58A (55–0671), remained airborne for 18 hours 10 minutes while averaging an airspeed of 620 mph over 11,000 miles. This was apparently the longest-lasting single flight ever by a B-58 and crewed by Lt Col. Leonard M. Legge, Pilot, Capt. R.R. Wagner, defensive systems operator and Capt. Andrew Rose, navigator. The 43rd received deliveries of new aircraft from Convair throughout the year, the last being in December 1960.

From March 1960 to July 1961, the 43rd operated a combat-crew training school for B-58 aircrews, and, from July 1962 until late 1969 it served as one of two SAC B-58 wings with a strategic-bombardment mission. During the 1960s the wing established world-flight speed records in the B-58, beginning on 12 January 1961, when it set six international speed and payload records on a single flight, five of which were held by the Soviet Union. Three of these records lasted only two days, when they were broken by another 43rd Hustler, which flew over a 1,000 km closed course with a payload of 2,000 kg at an average speed of 1284.73 mph, simultaneously breaking the 1,000 kg and no payload records. (Note: This was 222.9 mph faster than the flight two days earlier. Knaack, p. 394.) The crew on the second flight was awarded the Thompson Trophy.

On 29 May 1961, a wing B-58 flew from New York to Paris in 3 hours, 14 minutes, and 45 seconds, establishing a new transatlantic speed record of 1,089.36 mph, earning the crew the MacKay Trophy. On 5 March 1962, a wing B-58 flew from Los Angeles to New York at an average speed of 1,214.65 mph. It flew from Los Angeles to New York and back in 4 hours, 41 minutes, and 15 seconds. This earned the crew another MacKay Trophy and the Bendix Trophy.

The wing, which had been prevented from being declared combat-ready by the B-58's teething problems, was finally declared as such in August 1962. In response to the Cuban Missile Crisis, the wing was placed on alert in October 1962.

By the mid-1960s, the B-58 had become a fairly effective weapons system. By the end of 1962, USAF crews had made over 10,500 flights and logged 53,000 hours (1150 of them supersonic, including 375 at Mach 2). Initially, all B-58 training was conducted by the 43rd's combat-crew training school. From 1960 through 1964, this unit fulfilled the requirements of both its parent 43rd Bomb Wing and the second B-58 wing, the 305th Bomb Wing. In August 1964, the 305th activated its own CCTS. The wing also controlled an air-refueling squadron from August 1964.

==== Hustler operations at Little Rock Air Force Base ====
In September 1964, the 43rd Bomb Wing relocated to Little Rock Air Force Base, Arkansas.

The active service life of the B-58 was destined to be rather short. Phaseout of the B-58 fleet was ordered by Secretary of Defense Robert McNamara in December 1965, since it was felt that the high-altitude performance of the B-58 could no longer guarantee success against increasingly sophisticated Soviet air defenses. Although SAC had never been happy with the relatively limited range of the B-58 and felt that the Air Force, through congressional pressure, had forced the B-58 on them, the aircraft had gone through a long gestation period during which many bugs had been wrung out of the system, and it was now thought to be a valuable and effective weapons system. Consequently, SAC pressed the Defense Department for the retention of the B-58, at least until 1974. However, the decision of 1965 was to stand.

Another factor was the B-58's relatively high cost as compared to the B-52 and B-47. The unit cost of the B-58 was 33.5-million dollars as compared to nine-million for the B-52 and three-million for the B-47. In addition, the B-58 was quite costly to maintain. The cost of maintaining and operating two B-58 wings equaled the cost of maintaining six B-52 wings.

The first B-58 to go to the "boneyard" was 59-2446 which flew to Davis-Monthan Air Force Base on 5 November 1969. Once underway, the B-58 retirement program moved relatively rapidly. The retirement was completed on 16 January 1970.

=== Vietnam War ===
==== 3960th Strategic Wing ====
Once their B-58s were in storage, the 43rd was temporarily inactivated, but was immediately reactivated with the assets of the 3960th Strategic Wing (SW) at Andersen Air Force Base on Guam. The 3960th had been established at Andersen as the 3960th Air Base Wing when the base transferred from Pacific Air Forces to SAC on 1 April 1955.

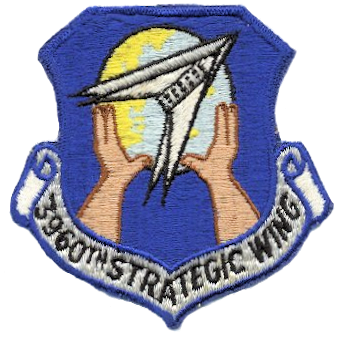
3960th Strategic Wing Emblem

The 3960th supported SAC Boeing B-47 Stratojet deployments to Andersen over the years the wing designation (Note: The wing became the 3960th Air Base Group on 1 July 1956, the 3960th Combat Support Group on 1 July 1959 and the 3960th Strategic Wing on 1 November 1963, with a brief return to the 3960th Combat Support Group designation on 1 August 1964. See Fletcher, pp. 1-5.) and its mission changed to supporting deployed Boeing B-52 Stratofortress aircraft forming the Andersen Task Force, Provisional.

On 1 April 1965 the wing once again was redesignated the 3960th Strategic Wing and its mission changed to support B-52 elements from SAC CONUS-based units engaged in combat operations over Southeast Asia on a daily basis during the Vietnam War as the 320th Bombardment Wing from Mather Air Force Base California and the 454th Bombardment Wing at Columbus Air Force Base, Mississippi

==== Operations at Andersen Air Force Base ====
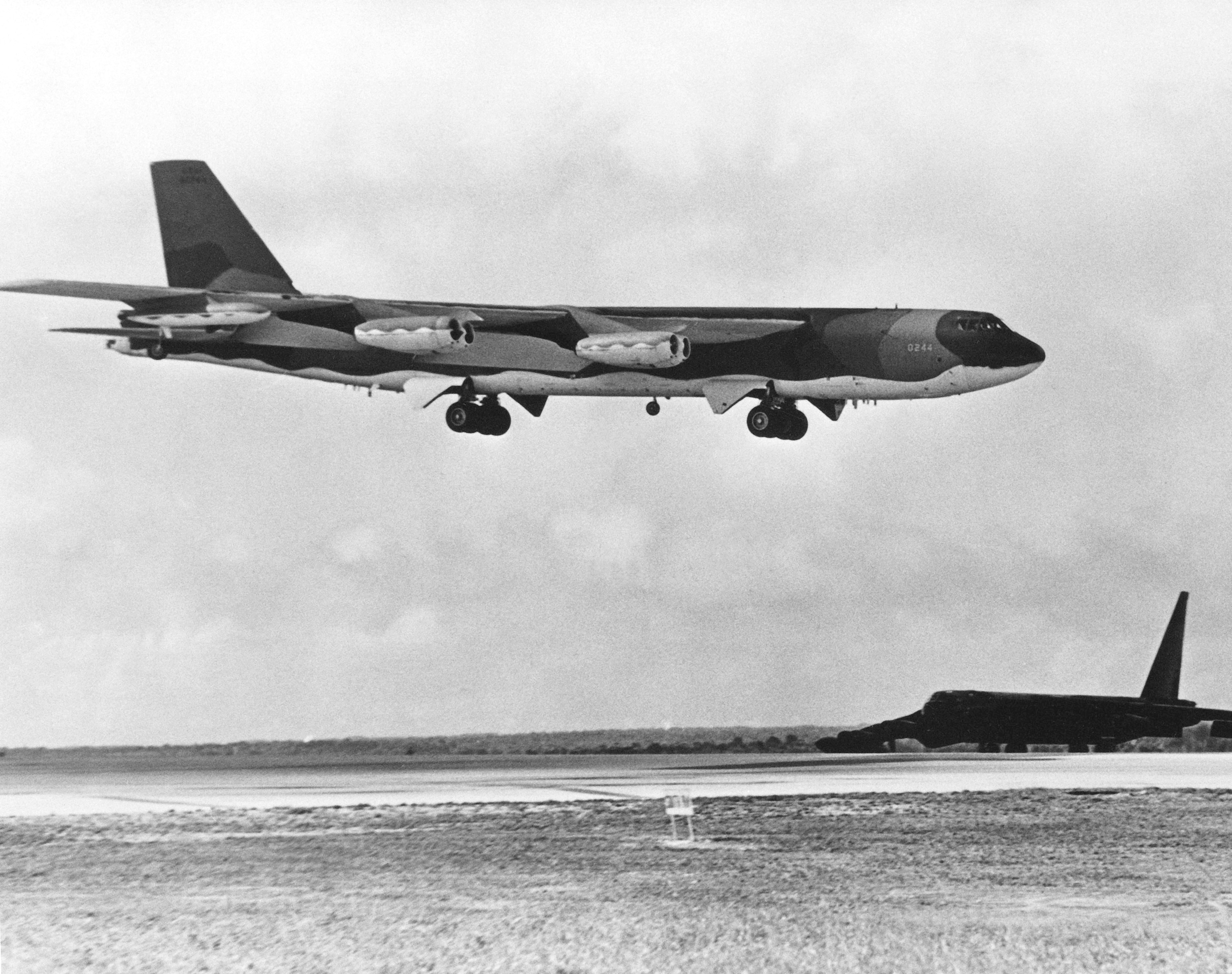
B-52G landing at Andersen AFB after an Operation Linebacker mission

In 1970, in order to retain the lineage of the 43rd Bomb Wing, Headquarters SAC received authority from Headquarters USAF to discontinue its MAJCON 3960th SW and activate a regular AFCON wing which was inactive at the time which could carry a lineage and history of the mission at Anderson.

On 1 April 1970, the 3960th was discontinued and replaced by the 43rd Bomb Wing, which became the 43rd Strategic Wing. In July, it also assumed resources and mission of the Bombardment Wing, Provisional, 4133rd, which had operational control over B-52s striking targets in Southeast Asia. The 43rd employed attached aircraft and aircrews of other SAC units that were deployed from bases in the United States to participate in Operation Arc Light combat missions in Southeast Asia from 1 July to mid-August 1970, and again from February 1972 to August 1973.

Following the end of combat operations, the 43rd provided routing training and ground alert with B-52 and KC-135 aircraft, the latter provided by other SAC units on loan. During 1975 the wing provided logistical and medical support to thousands of Vietnamese refugees evacuated from their homeland and located temporarily at Guam awaiting resettlement in the United States.

The wing trained to remain proficient in long-range nuclear bombing and conventional warfare capabilities. Beginning in 1974 it controlled temporary duty tankers and crews participating in the Pacific (formerly Andersen) Tanker Task Force that supported SAC operations in the western Pacific Ocean. The 60th Bombardment Squadron was the wing's primary flying unit during the 1980s. However, in July 1986 the 65th Strategic Squadron was activated to control the Temporary Duty air refueling aircraft.

=== Since 1990 ===
Since 1990 the 43rd has been inactivated, redesignated and activated on several occasions. In 1989 Andersen was transferred from Strategic Air Command to Pacific Air Forces. The 633rd Air Base Wing was activated on 1 October 1989, assuming the personnel and equipment of the 43rd Bombardment Wing, which was inactivated.

The wing was redesignated as the 43rd Air Refueling Wing, and activated, on 1 June 1992 at Malmstrom Air Force Base, Montana where it conducted refueling operations under Air Combat Command (ACC) before moving to MacDill Air Force Base, Florida when flight operations ended at Malmstrom.

At MacDill it was redesignated as the 43rd Air Refueling Group and operated until 1 October 1996 when it was inactivated and replaced by the 6th Air Refueling Wing when Air Mobility Command (AMC) assumed the airrefueling mission from ACC.

It was brought back into active service in 1997 when the unit was redesignated the 43rd Airlift Wing on 31 March and activated on 1 April 1997 at Pope Air Force Base, North Carolina under AMC.

Crews and aircraft deployed to Europe and Southwest Asia for expeditionary rotations and contingency operations such as the enforcement of no-fly zones over Iraq. It also took part in humanitarian airlift operations and training exercises, often with U.S. Army airborne organizations stationed at nearby Fort Bragg, North Carolina. After terrorist attacks on the United States on 11 September 2001, elements deployed in support of the Global War on Terror.

The 2005 Base Realignment and Closure Commission mandated the distribution of the assigned 43rd Airlift Wing C-130s and the 23rd Fighter Group A-10s to meet Air Force requirements at other locations; established a Reserve/Active Duty 16 C-130H organization; established a Medical Squadron; established an Air Force Group to provide mission execution, planning, and management of efficient load-out of Fort Bragg assets; and transferred Real Property accountability to the Army at Fort Bragg. The 2005 BRAC Law directed that the mandates be completed no later than 15 September 2011.

The 440th Airlift Wing stood up at Pope Air Force Base in June 2007, and the active-duty squadrons (the 2nd Airlift Squadron and the 43rd Aeromedical Evacuation Squadron) were associated in June 2008. The transfer of the Pope-assigned 23rd Fighter Group A-10s was completed in December 2007, and, the 43rd Airlift Wing C-130s was completed in June 2008.

The wing was inactivated on 1 March 2011, and, its 43rd Operations Group redesignated as the 43rd Airlift Group.

== Lineage ==
- Designated as 43rd Bombardment Wing, Very Heavy on 3 November 1947 (Note: The 1947 organization was a table of distribution unit organized as part of the Air Force's experimental wing base organization reorganization. It was replaced by a table of organization unit in July 1948. Ravenstein, pp. xxi, 128. The two wings were later formally consolidated. Department of the Air Force/MPM Letter 539q, 31 January 1984, Subject: Consolidation of Units.)

Organized on 17 November 1947
Redesignated 43rd Bombardment Wing, Medium on 1 August 1948
Inactivated on 31 January 1970
Redesignated 43rd Strategic Wing on 4 February 1970
Activated on 4 February 1970.
Organized on 1 April 1970
Redesignated 43rd Bombardment Wing, Heavy on 4 November 1986
Inactivated on 30 September 1990
Redesignated 43rd Air Refueling Wing and activated, on 1 June 1992
Redesignated 43rd Air Refueling Group on 1 July 1994
Inactivated on 1 October 1996
Redesignated 43rd Airlift Wing on 31 March 1997
Activated on 1 April 1997
Inactivated on 1 March 2011

=== Assignments ===
- Eighth Air Force, 17 November 1947
- Fifteenth Air Force, 1 April 1950
- 36th Air Division, 4 September 1951 (attached to 7th Air Division, c. 10 March-5 June 1953 and 5 September-10 December 1954 and to 3rd Air Division, 1 July-1 October 1957
- 19th Air Division, 15 March 1960 (attached to 825th Strategic Aerospace Division, after 19 August 1964)
- 825th Strategic Aerospace Division, 1 September 1964
- 42nd Air Division, 1–31 January 1970
- Eighth Air Force, 1 April 1970 (attached to Air Division, Provisional, 57, 1 June 1972 – 14 November 1973)
- 3rd Air Division, 1 January 1975 – 30 September 1990
- Fifteenth Air Force, 1 June 1992 – 1 October 1996
- Twenty-First Air Force, 1 April 1997
- Eighteenth Air Force, 1 October 2003
- United States Air Force Expeditionary Center, 7 January 2011 – 1 March 2011

=== Components ===
Groups

- 43rd Bombardment (later, 43rd Operations) Group: 17 November 1947 – 16 June 1952 (detached 16 August – 16 November 1949; not operational, 10 February 1951 – 16 June 1952); 1 June 1992 – 1 July 1994; 1 April 1997 –
- 453rd Operations Group: 1 June 1992 – 1 July 1994
- 459th Bombardment Group: attached 27 June 1949 – 16 June 1951
- 2nd Bombardment Group: attached 17 November 1947 – 31 December 1948 (not operational).

Squadrons

- 2nd Airlift Squadron: 1 April 1997 – present
- 2nd Air Refueling Squadron: attached c. 30 April 1949 – 16 September 1950 (not operational, 30 April – 30 June 1949; further attached to 43 Bombardment Group, 1 July 1949 – 16 September 1950);attached 1 July 1949 – 16 September 1950
- 9th Air Refueling Squadron: attached 1 August 1951 – 15 January 1952 and 6 October – 14 November 1952
- 28th Air Refueling Squadron: 1 June 1992 – 15 May 1994
- 41st Airlift Squadron: 1 April 1997 – 23 February 2007
- 43rd Aeromedical Evacuation Squadron: 1 April 1997 – present
- 43rd Air Refueling Squadron

Attached: 10 February 1951 – 15 June 1952
Assigned: 19 July 1948 – 15 March 1960 (detached 18 October – 28 December 1955); 19 July 1948 – 16 June 1952 (detached 10 February 1951 – 16 June 1952)

- 60th Bombardment Squadron: 1 July 1971 – 30 April 1990 (not operational, 1 July 1971 – c. February 1972)
- 63rd Bombardment Squadron: 1 October 1946 – 31 January 1970 (detached 10 February 1951 – 16 June 1952)
  - Bombardment Squadron Provisional, 63rd: attached 15 June 1972 – 30 June 1975 (not operational, c. November 1973 – 30 June 1975)
- 64th Bombardment Squadron: 1 October 1946 – 31 January 1970 (detached 10 February 1951 – 16 June 1952)
- 65th Bombardment Squadron (later, 65th Strategic Squadron): attached 10 February 1951 – 15 June 1952, assigned 16 June 1952 – 31 January 1970 (not operational, 15 March – August 1960); 1 July 1986 – 1 July 1990
- 70th Air Refueling Squadron: attached 19 August–31, 1964, assigned 1 September 1964 – 1 January 1970
- 91st Air Refueling Squadron: 1 July 1994 – 1 October 1996; 1 June 1992 – 1 July 1994
- 97th Air Refueling Squadron: 1 October 1992 – 1 April 1994
- 307th Air Refueling Squadron: attached 16 September 1950 – 1 August 1951 (further attached to 43rd Bombardment Group, 16 September 1950 – 9 February 1951); attached 16 September 1950 – 9 February 1951
- 350th Air Refueling Squadron: 1 October 1993 – 1 July 1994.
- 403rd Bombardment Squadron: 15 January 1941 – 29 April 1946; 1 December 1958 – 15 March 1960; 15 May 1960 – 1 January 1961 (not operational)
- 905th Air Refueling Squadron: 1 July – 1 October 1993
- 906th Air Refueling Squadron: 1 June 1992 – 30 January 1994
- 4182nd Bombardment Squadron: 1 April 1970 – 1 January 1971 (not operational)

=== Stations ===
- Davis-Monthan Field (later Davis-Monthan Air Force Base), Arizona, 17 November 1947 (deployed to RAF Brize Norton, England, c. 10 March – 5 June 1953, RAF Fairford, England, 5 September – 10 December 1954, Andersen Air Force Base, Guam, 1 July – 1 October 1957)
- Carswell Air Force Base, Texas, 15 March 1960
- Little Rock Air Force Base, Arkansas, 1 September 1964 – 31 January 1970
- Andersen Air Force Base, Guam, 1 April 1970 – 30 September 1990
- Malmstrom Air Force Base, Montana, 1 June 1992 – 1 July 1994
- MacDill Air Force Base, Florida, 1 October 1996
- Pope Air Force Base (later Pope Army Airfield), North Carolina, 1 April 1997 – 1 March 2011

=== Aircraft ===
- B-29 Superfortress, 1944–1950
- KB-29 (tanker), 1949–1953
- B-50 Superfortress, 1948–1954
- KC-97 Stratofreighter, 1953–1955, 1955–1960; 1970–1972
- B-47 Stratojet, 1954–1960
- YRB-58, B/TB-58 Hustler, 1960–1970
- TF-102 Delta Dagger, 1960–1962
- KC-135 Stratotanker, 1964–1972; 1973–1980; 1992–1996
- B-52 Stratofortress, 1970–1990

B-52D, 1970–1983; B-52G, 1983–1990

- KC-10 Extender, 1986–1990
- C-118 Liftmaster, 1973–1974
- C-12 Huron, 1994
- C-130 Hercules, 1997–2011

=== Awards ===
- Mackay Trophy: 1949, 1961, 1962
- Air Age (Vandenberg) Trophy: 1949
- Thompson Trophy: 1961
- Bendix Trophy: 1962

=== Expeditions ===
- Operation Joint Endeavour
- Operation Southern Watch

== See also ==
- List of B-50 units of the United States Air Force
- List of B-47 units of the United States Air Force
