= Xinjin Airport =

Xinjin Airport 新津机场
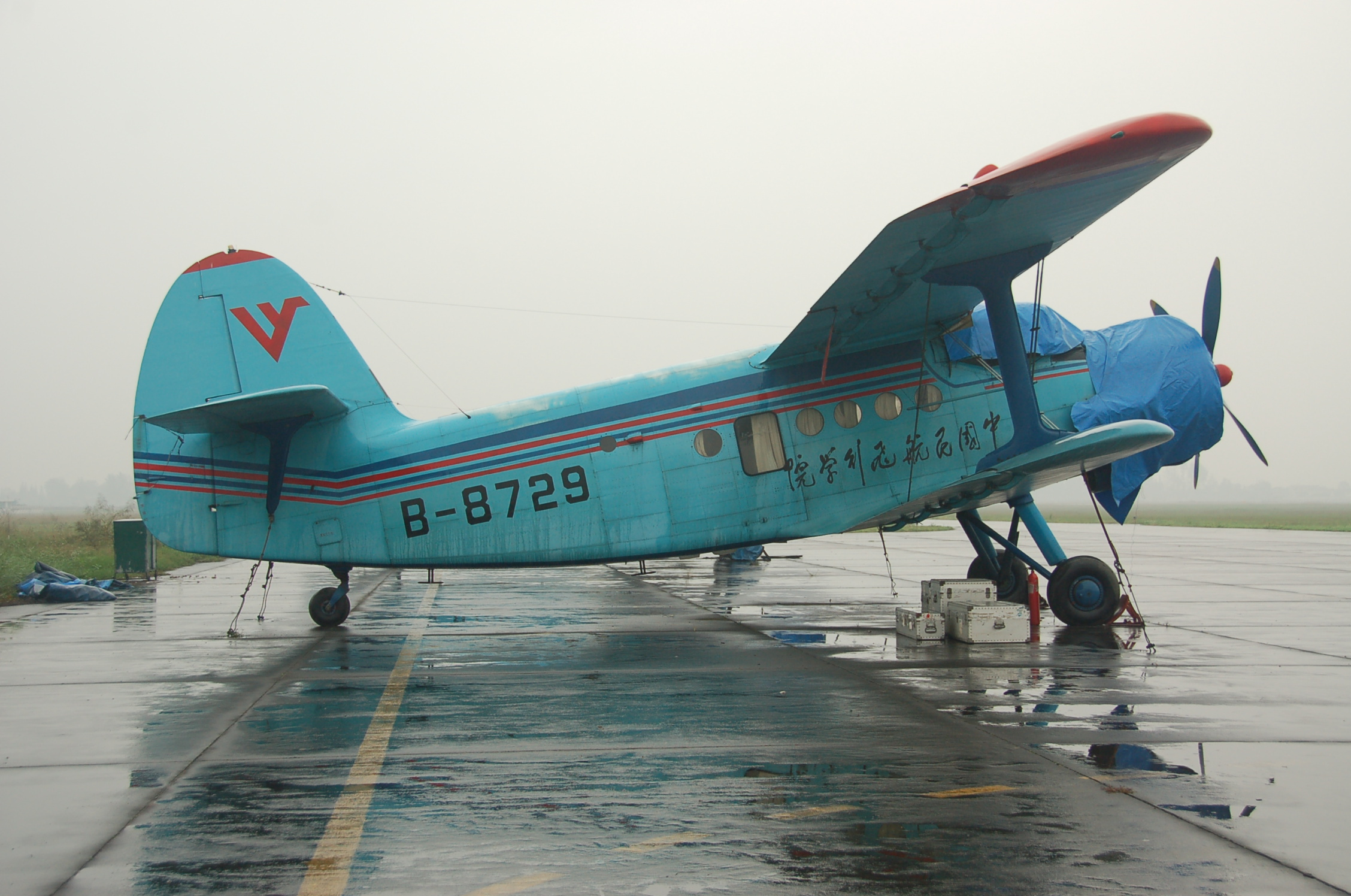
- Shijiazhuang Y-5 of Civil Aviation Flight University of China at Xinjin Airport
- IATA: none; ICAO: ZUXJ

Summary
- Airport type: Former military
- Operator: Civil Aviation Flight University of China
- Location: Xinjin District, Chengdu, Sichuan, China
- Built: 1928
- Coordinates: 30°25′13″N 103°50′41″E

Map
- Location of airport in Sichuan

Xinjin Airport (ICAO: ZUXJ) is an airport in Xinjin District, in the southwestern part of Chengdu, in Sichuan province of China. The airfield is located approximately 2 km east of the Xinjin District seat, just east of the China National Highway 108. A former military airfield, it is now used by Civil Aviation Flight University of China for pilot training.

== History ==
The airfield was first constructed in 1928, served as a base for Republic of China Air Force Polikarpov I-15 and I-16 fighters in defense of Chengdu and Chongqing against Imperial Japanese aerial raids during the War of Resistance-World War II, and then upgraded in 1940 and again in 1943 after the U.S. entered the war following the Pearl Harbor attack. The facility was them operated by the United States Army Air Force XX Bomber Command beginning in March 1944. It was then known as Hsinching Airfield (A-1), and was the forward staging base for the 40th Bombardment Group, which carried out B-29 Superfortress raids on the Japanese Home Islands. It was one of four B-29 bases established by the Americans in China.

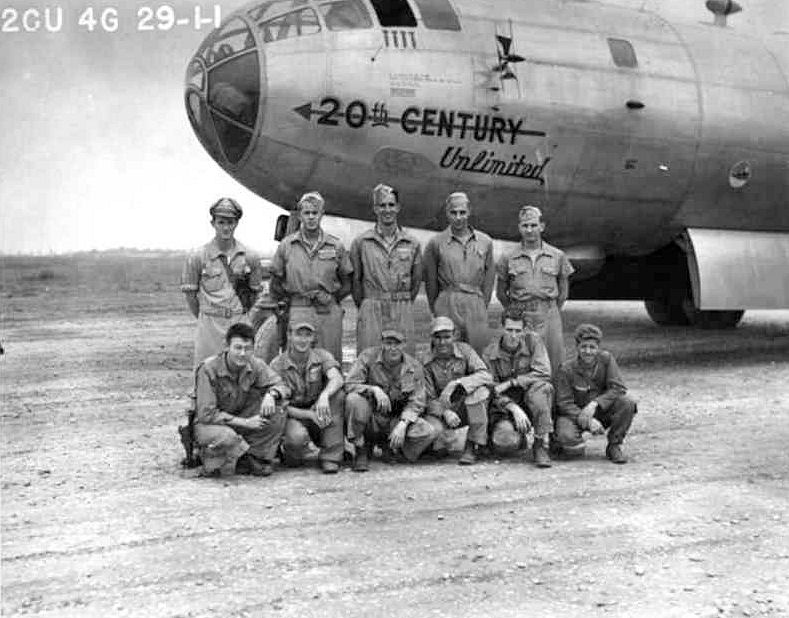
40th Bombardment Group Boeing B-29-5-BW Superfortress 42-6281 "20th Century Unlimited" at Hsinching Airfield (A-1), China, advanced China Base of the 40th Bomb Group after completion of a raid on Anshan, Manchuria. Mission #4, 29 July 1944

Staging through Hsinching from its base at Chakulia, India, on June 15 the group participated in the first American Air Force attack on the Japanese Home Islands since the Doolittle Raid in 1942. Operating from bases in India, and at times staging through fields in China, the group struck such targets as transportation centers, naval installations, iron works, and aircraft plants in Burma, Thailand, China, Japan, Indonesia, and Formosa, receiving a Distinguished Unit Citation for bombing iron and steel works at Yawata, Japan, on August 20, 1944.

Effective 6 April 1944, Hsinching Airfield was also the forward headquarters of XX Bomber Command while its rear echelon remained at Kharagpur Airfield in India. When the B-29 bombers were moved from India in February 1945 to the newly captured bases in the Mariana Islands, the B-29 use of Hsinching Airfield ended.

The Tenth Air Force 24th Combat Mapping Squadron established a detachment at the airfield in March 1944 to photograph bombing targets both before and after XX Bomber Command missions. In December 1944, the unit was replaced by Flight "C", 1st Photographic Reconnaissance Squadron (Very Long Range), which remained until May 1945.

From 2nd WRS Squadron History obtained from Air Force Historical Research Agency At the request of the XX Bomber Command, preparations for sending a 2nd Weather Reconnaissance Squadron flight to China began during the latter part of November (1944). It was decided that "C" Flight, with Capt Jean W Dixon as flight commander would undertake the initial assignment in the forward area. The flight consisted of Capt Dixon and crew, 1st Lt Joseph Shannon and crew, and 1st Lt James R Malin and crew with B-25D aircraft nos. 673, 674 and 675. On 22 November, key ground personnel of "C" flight arrived at Hsing Ching Army Air Base, while the squadron aircraft arrived 25 November. "C" flight operations were so arranged as to provide weather recon of the North China sectors several days prior to the first B-29 raid in each of the series of missions run by the XX Bomber Command from the Chengtu area. Recon to the North continued a day prior to the actual running of the B-29 missions. Our aircraft provided a route weather coverage within a 700-statute-mile (1,100 km) radius of action, with particular attention given to icing conditions, cloud levels, and turbulence and winds, together with a visual check of the predetermined rendezvous area.

Also the Fourteenth Air Force 1st Combat Cargo Squadron performed special operation cargo drops from the airfield during the spring (January-March) 1945 with C-47s.

The Americans used the airfield as a communications station for the remainder of the war, and turned over the airfield to the Chinese government on 29 August 1945.

== See also ==
- Operation Matterhorn
