= 508th Aerospace Sustainment Wing =

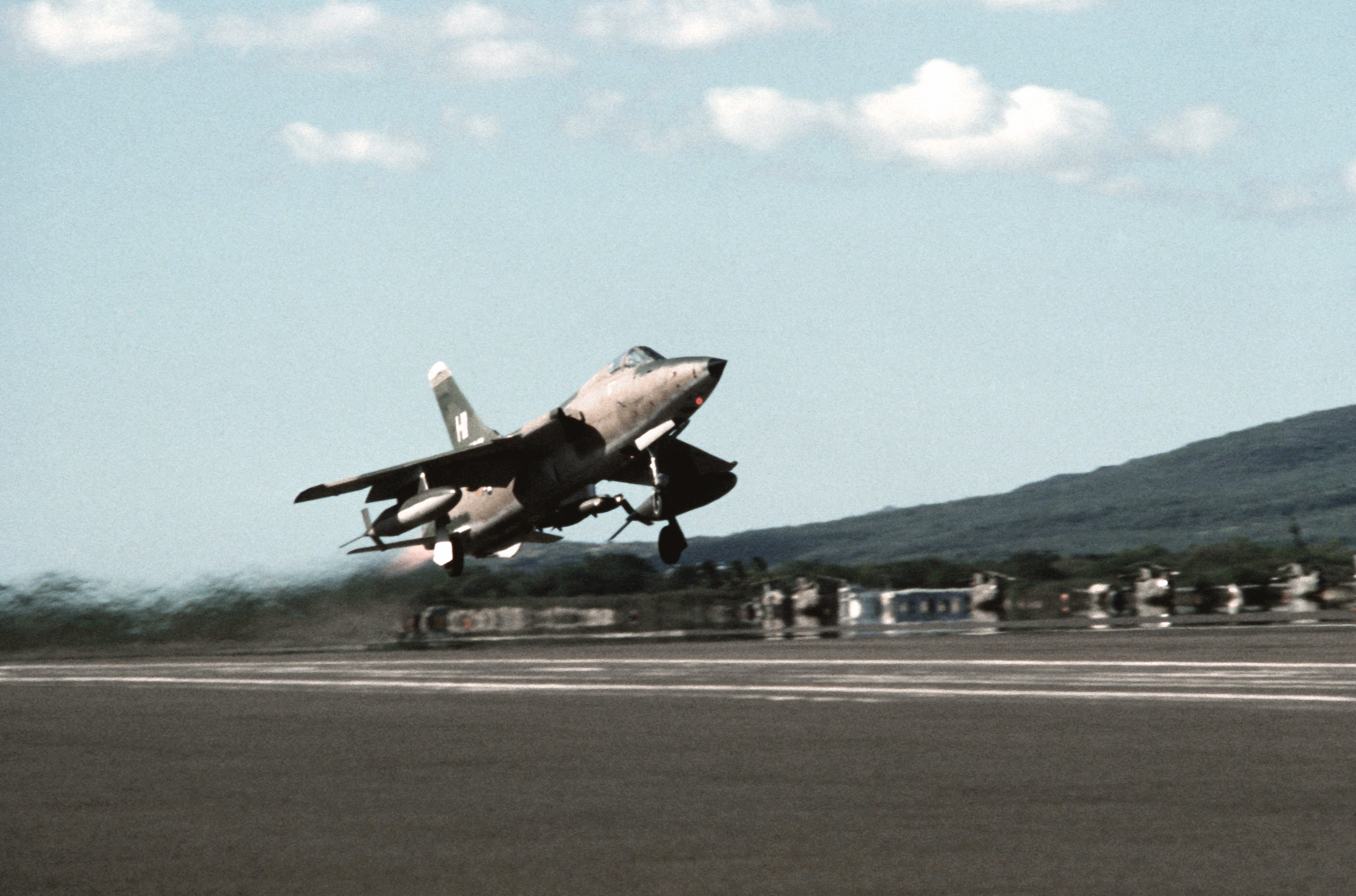
- 508th Fighter Group F-105 Thunderchief
- Active: 1944–1945; 1952–1956; 1973; 1975–1982; 2005–2010
- Country: United States
- Branch: United States Air Force
- Type: Aircraft Support
- Mottos: Knowledge and Courage

Commanders
- Notable commanders: Lt Gen Gerald W. Johnson

Insignia
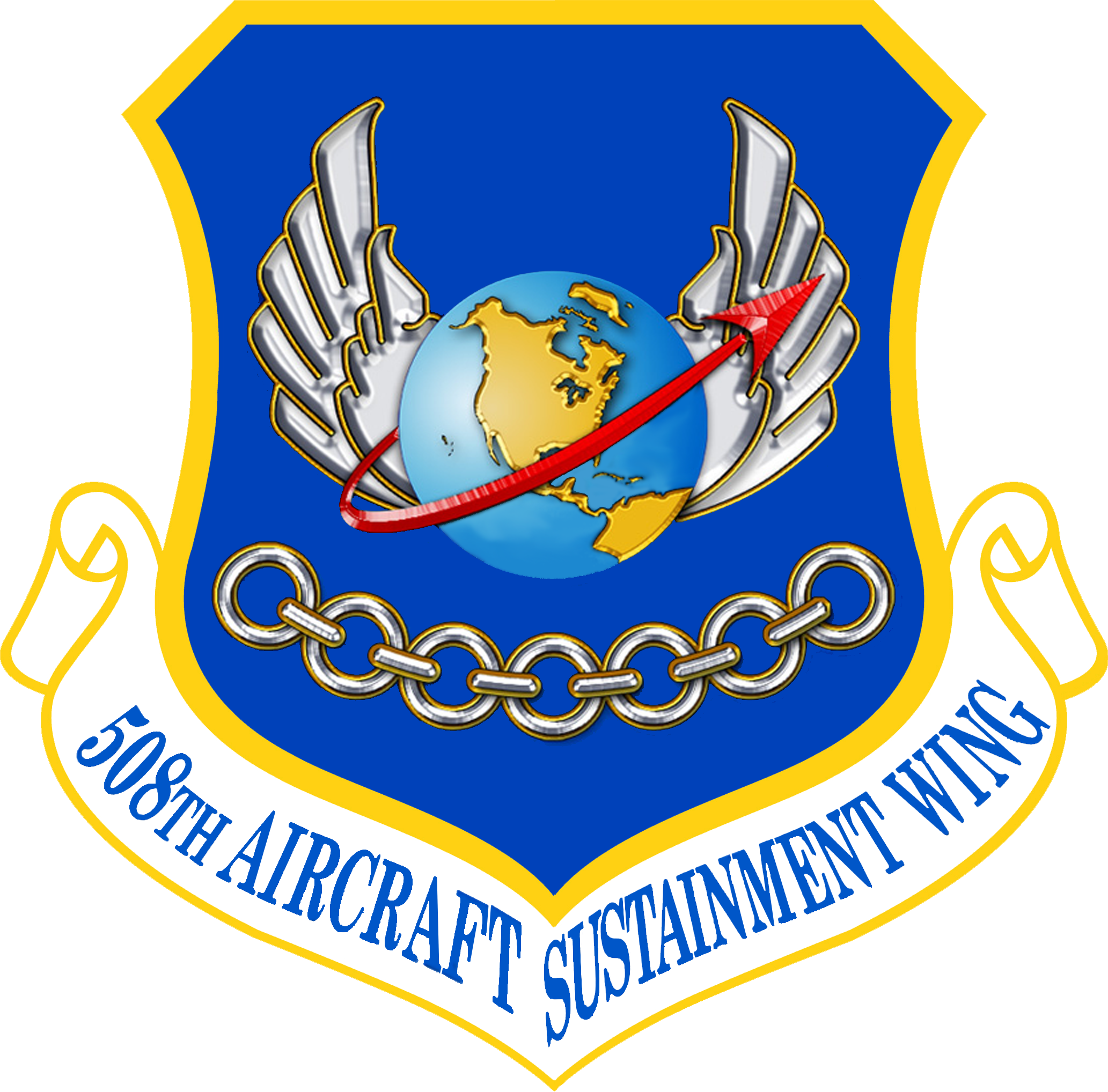
- 508th Aircraft Sustainment Wing emblem

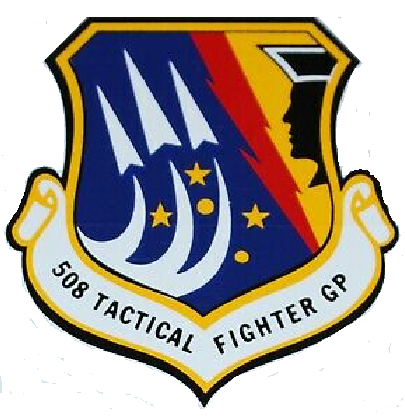
- 508th Tactical Fighter Group emblem

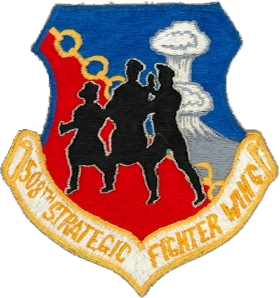
- Patch with 508th Strategic Fighter Wing emblem (Note: Approved 14 September 1952.)

The 508th Aerospace Sustainment Wing was a wing of the United States Air Force based at Hill Air Force Base, Utah. It was activated in 2005, after being formed by the consolidation of two units in 1984.

The 508th Fighter Group was activated late in World War II. The group was designed as a long range fighter escort unit, but when Japanese fighter defenses weakened, the group instead provided air defense of the Hawaiian Islands and training for other fighter units in the Pacific. It was inactivated in late 1945 and its personnel and equipment were used to form the 15th Fighter Group. The group was redesignated the 508th Tactical Fighter Group and activated in the Air Force Reserve, in 1973. It trained pilots in fighter tactics until 1982, when its resources were used to form the 419th Tactical Fighter Wing.

The 508th Fighter Escort Wing was formed in Strategic Air Command (SAC) in 1951 to provide fighter escort for SAC bombers and conduct long range penetration missions. It deployed to Japan to provide air defense of northern Japan and to fly escort missions for reconnaissance missions in the area. The wing was inactivated in 1956 and some of its personnel were used to form the cadre for the 4080th Strategic Reconnaissance Wing. In January 1984, it was consolidated with the 508th Tactical Fighter Group.

== History ==
Media related to 508th Aerospace Sustainment Wing (United States Air Force) at Wikimedia Commons

=== World War II ===
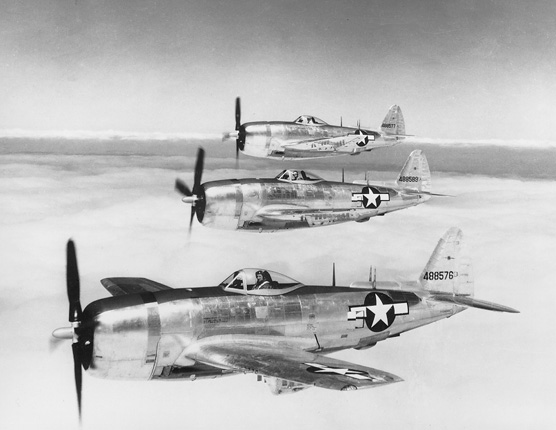
Long range Republic P-47Ns

The 508th Fighter Group was activated on 12 October 1944 at Peterson Field, Colorado with the 466th, 467th and 468th Fighter Squadrons assigned as its first operational units. Its cadre moved to Pocatello Army Air Field, Idaho two weeks later to begin training. The group trained with late model Republic P-47 Thunderbolt aircraft to provide very-long-range escort for Boeing B-29 Superfortresses in the Pacific Theater of Operations.

The lack of significant Japanese fighter defense by late 1944 caused a change of mission and the group's destination was changed to Hawaii, where it arrived in January 1945. The 508th acted as part of the defense force for the Hawaiian Islands. In Hawaii, the group also trained replacement pilots for other organizations, repaired P-47s and North American P-51 Mustangs of fighter units engaged in combat, and ferried aircraft to forward areas.

The unit was inactivated in Hawaii on 25 November 1945 and replaced by the 15th Fighter Group, which moved on paper from Iwo Jima and assumed the 508th's mission, personnel and equipment.

=== Strategic Air Command ===
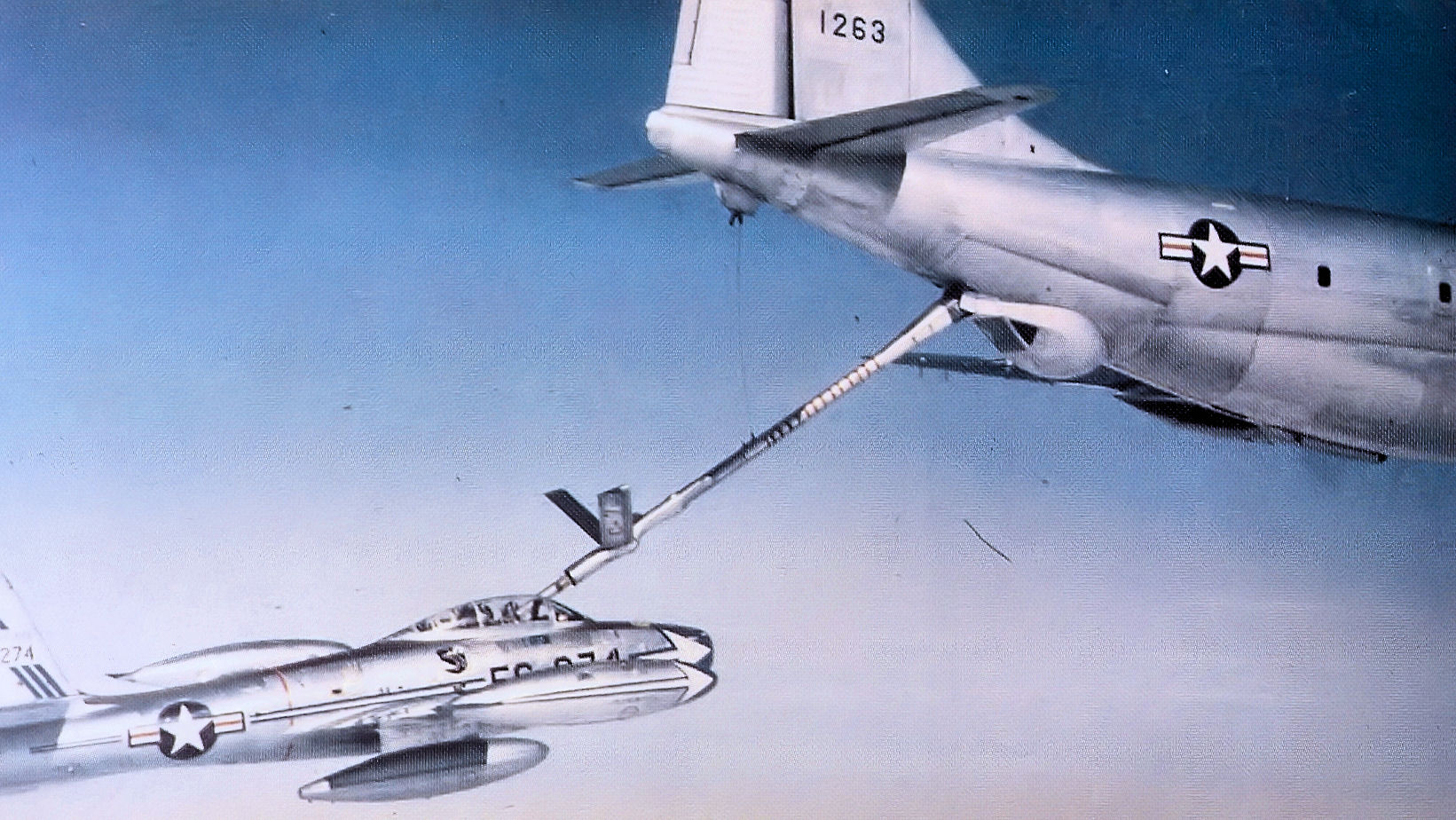
508th Wing F-84 being refueled by a KC-97 (Note: Aircraft are Republic F-84G-20-RE Thunderjet serial 51-1274 and Boeing KC-97F-55-BO Stratofreighter serial 51-263. Taken in 1953.)

The 508th Fighter-Escort Wing was activated at Turner Air Force Base, Georgia by Strategic Air Command in July 1952, drawing its initial personnel and equipment from the 31st Fighter-Escort Wing, which was already stationed at Turner. Its mission was to provide fighter escort for Strategic Air Command (SAC) bombers and to provide point defense, particularly for areas of strategic importance. It had a secondary mission of conducting long range offensive intruder missions.

Little more than six months after its activation, the wing became the 508th Strategic Fighter Wing, emphasizing that its mission went beyond escorting bombers. In Operation Long Stride, the wing performed what at the time was the longest nonstop flight by single engine jet aircraft in history. In August 1953, twenty wing aircraft flew from its home base at Turner to RAF Lakenheath in England, returning in September.

Strategic Air Command fighter wings had been deployed to augment the air defenses of the Far East Air Forces since the Korean War. In 1953 and 1954, the wing twice deployed to Misawa Air Base, Japan, to augment the 39th Air Division, which was responsible for air defense in northern Japan. SAC fighters deployed to Japan also provided escort for reconnaissance aircraft flying missions in the area. (Note: This duty was shared with the 31st Wing at Turner and the 12th and 27th Strategic Fighter Wings at Bergstrom Air Force Base. Texas. Ravenstein, pp. 27, 50, 55, 275. It also included fighter escort for reconnaissance aircraft flying missions in the area. AFHRA Factsheet, 39 Air Division.)

The wing was inactivated on 11 May 1956 in Project Black Knight. Its 508th Tactical Hospital was transferred to the 4080th Strategic Reconnaissance Wing, which activated at Turner on 1 May, and a number of its personnel were transferred to form the cadre for the 4080th Wing. The 506th's commander, Col Gerald W. Johnson became the first commander of the 4080th.

=== Air Force Reserve ===
In 1972 the Air Force Reserve began to receive Republic F-105 Thunderchiefs, which were becoming surplus to Air Force needs in Southeast Asia. To operate these fighters, it formed three tactical fighter groups, the last of which was the 508th Tactical Fighter Group at Hill Air Force Base, Utah, which was activated in January 173. Hill was selected because the 945th Military Airlift Group there was slated to lose its Douglas C-124 Globemaster IIs, which were being removed from the inventory. The transition from four reciprocating engine transports to supersonic jet fighters was one of the most difficult the reserves had faced.

Less than four months later the Reserve reassigned its tactical fighter squadrons directly to the 301st Tactical Fighter Wing. During the period the group was inactive, its place was taken by Detachment 508, 301st Fighter Wing. After two years the group was once again activated. The group trained in fighter tactics, upgrading to the F-105D and F-105F in 1980. The unit was inactivated, and its mission, personnel and equipment were absorbed by the activating 419th Tactical Fighter Wing.

=== Air Force Materiel Command ===
The 508th Aerospace Sustainment Wing was activated in February 2005 as the Air Force Materiel Command reorganized its management offices into a structure of wings, groups and squadrons. It sustained existing weapons and support systems and assisted with the acquisition new systems. It served all United States military services, civil agencies, and a number of foreign countries. Its support included acquisition, engineering and technical modification, modernization, as well as maintenance, repair, and planning. Wing functions included acquisition, modification, modernization and maintenance and repair of the systems it supported.

Its 508th Aircraft Sustainment Group acted in concert with the General Dynamics F-16 Fighting Falcon System Program Office at Wright-Patterson Air Force Base to direct F-16 "production, sustainment, engineering and manufacturing development, modification and worldwide deployment" for F-16 aircraft for units of the United States Air Force and the air arms of 18 foreign nations. This included foreign co-production and is still among the most complex acquisition program in the Department of Defense.

Its 508th Mature Aircraft and Simulator Sustainment Group, and later, the 558th Aircraft Sustainment Group was responsible for acquiring improved capabilities and sustainment for 36 different aircraft weapon systems. "Mature aircraft" are out of production but still active in the Air Force inventory. The largest programs were associated with the Fairchild A-10 Thunderbolt II, Cessna T-37 Tweet and Northrop T-38 Talon. The groups also supported aircraft not in the active Air Force inventory that were flown by foreign countries or other agencies of the United States. This group included the McDonnell F-4 Phantom II, Northrop F-5 Freedom Fighter, Douglas C-47 Skytrain and others.

Its 508th Attack Sustainment Squadron executed programs to sustain and improve the A-10 aircraft. Responsibilities include planning, programming and budgeting for modification and structural upgrade programs for the Thunderbolt II.

In addition, the wing managed sustainment programs for aerial targets and training devices for aircraft and for space systems and control and air traffic control towers. The wing is also prepared for sustainment programs for the Lockheed Martin F-22 Raptor and Lockheed Martin F-35 Lightning II aircraft.

The wing was inactivated in 2010 when Air Force Materiel Command returned to its traditional directorate system for program and maintenance management.

== Lineage ==
508th Aerospace Sustainment Wing

- Constituted as the 508th Fighter Group on 5 October 1944

Activated on 12 October 1944
Inactivated on 25 November 1945

- Redesignated 508th Tactical Fighter Group

Activated in the reserve on 1 January 1973
Inactivated on 25 March 1973
Activated in the reserve on 17 October 1975
Inactivated on 1 October 1982

- Consolidated with the 508th Strategic Fighter Wing on 31 January 1984
- Redesignated 508th Aircraft Sustainment Wing on 31 January 2005

Activated on 24 February 2005

- Redesignated 508th Aerospace Sustainment Wing on 13 August 2007

Inactivated on 30 June 2010

508th Strategic Fighter Wing

- Established as the 508th Fighter-Escort Wing on 19 June 1952

Activated on 1 July 1952
Redesignated 508th Strategic Fighter Wing on 20 January 1953
Inactivated on 11 May 1956

- Consolidated with the 508th Tactical Fighter Group as the 508th Tactical Fighter Group on 31 January 1984

=== Assignments ===
- 72d Fighter Wing, 12 October 1944
- VII Fighter Command, 6 January – 25 November 1945 (attached to 7th Fighter Wing)
- 40th Air Division, 1 July 1952 – 11 May 1956 (attached to 39th Air Division, 8 February – 13 May 1953; 12 February – 7 May 1954)
- 301st Fighter Wing, 1 January 1973 – 25 March 1972
- 301st Fighter Wing, 17 October 1975 – 1 October 1982
- Ogden Air Logistics Center, 24 February 2005 – 30 June 2010

=== Components ===
Groups

- 508th Fighter Sustainment Group (later 508th Aircraft Sustainment Group): 24 February 2005 – 30 June 2010
- 508th Mature Aircraft and Simulator Sustainment Group: 24 February 2005 – 28 April 2006
- 508th Medical Group (later 508th Tactical Hospital): 1 July 1952 – 11 May 1956
- 526th ICBM Systems Group: 13 August 2007 – 30 May 2008
- 538th Aircraft Sustainment Group: 30 July 2007 – 30 June 2010
- 558th Aircraft Sustainment Group: 28 April 2006 – 30 June 2010

Squadrons

- 466th Fighter Squadron (later 466th Strategic Fighter Squadron, 466th Tactical Fighter Squadron): 12 October 1944 – 25 November 1945; 1 July 1952 – 11 May 1956 (not operational until September 1952), 1 January 1973 – 25 March 1973, 17 October 1975 – 1 August 1982
- 467th Fighter Squadron (later 467th Strategic Fighter Squadron): 12 October 1944 – 25 November 1945; 1 July 1952 – 11 May 1956
- 468th Fighter Squadron (later 468th Strategic Fighter Squadron): 12 October 1944 – 25 November 1945; 1 July 1952 – 11 May 1956 (not operational until September 1952)
- 508th Air Refueling Squadron: 25 November 1953 – 11 May 1956 (detached 10 February – 1 June 1954; 4 July – 15 October 1954)
- 508th Armament and Electronics Maintenance Squadron: 1 July 1952 – 11 May 1956
- 508th Attack Sustainment Squadron (later 508th Aircraft Sustainment Squadron): 24 February 2005 – 30 July 2007
- 508th Combat Support Squadron: 1 January 1973 – 25 March 1973, 17 October 1975 – 1 August 1982
- 508th Field Maintenance Squadron (later 508th Consolidated Aircraft Maintenance Squadron): 1 July 1952 – 11 May 1956, 1 January 1973 – 25 March 1973, 17 October 1975 – 1 August 1982
- 508th Periodic Maintenance Squadron: 1 July 1952 – 11 May 1956

=== Stations ===
- Peterson Field, Colorado, 12 October 1944
- Pocatello Army Air Field, Idaho, 25 October 1944
- Bruning Army Air Field, Nebraska, 15 November – 18 December 1944
- Kahuku Army Air Field, Hawaii, 6 January 1945
- Mokuleia Field, Hawaii, 25 February 1945
- Bellows Field, Hawaii, 16 September – 25 November 1945
- Turner Air Force Base, Georgia, 1 July 1952 – 11 May 1956
- Hill Air Force Base, Utah, 1 January 1973 – 25 March 1972
- Hill Air Force Base, Utah, 17 October 1975 – 1 October 1982
- Hill Air Force Base, Utah, 24 February 2005 – 30 June 2010

=== Aircraft ===
- Republic P-47 Thunderbolt, 1944–1945
- Republic F-84 Thunderjet, 1952–1956
- Boeing KB-29 Superfortress, 1953–1956
- Republic F-105B Thunderchief, 1973–1980
- Republic F-105D Thunderchief, 1980–1982
- Republic F-105F Thunderchief, 1980–1982

=== Campaign ===
Campaign Streamer	Campaign	Dates	Notes
	Asiatic-Pacific Theater without inscription	6 January 1945 – 25 November 1945	508th Fighter Group
