= 467th Strategic Fighter Squadron =

467th Tactical Fighter Squadron
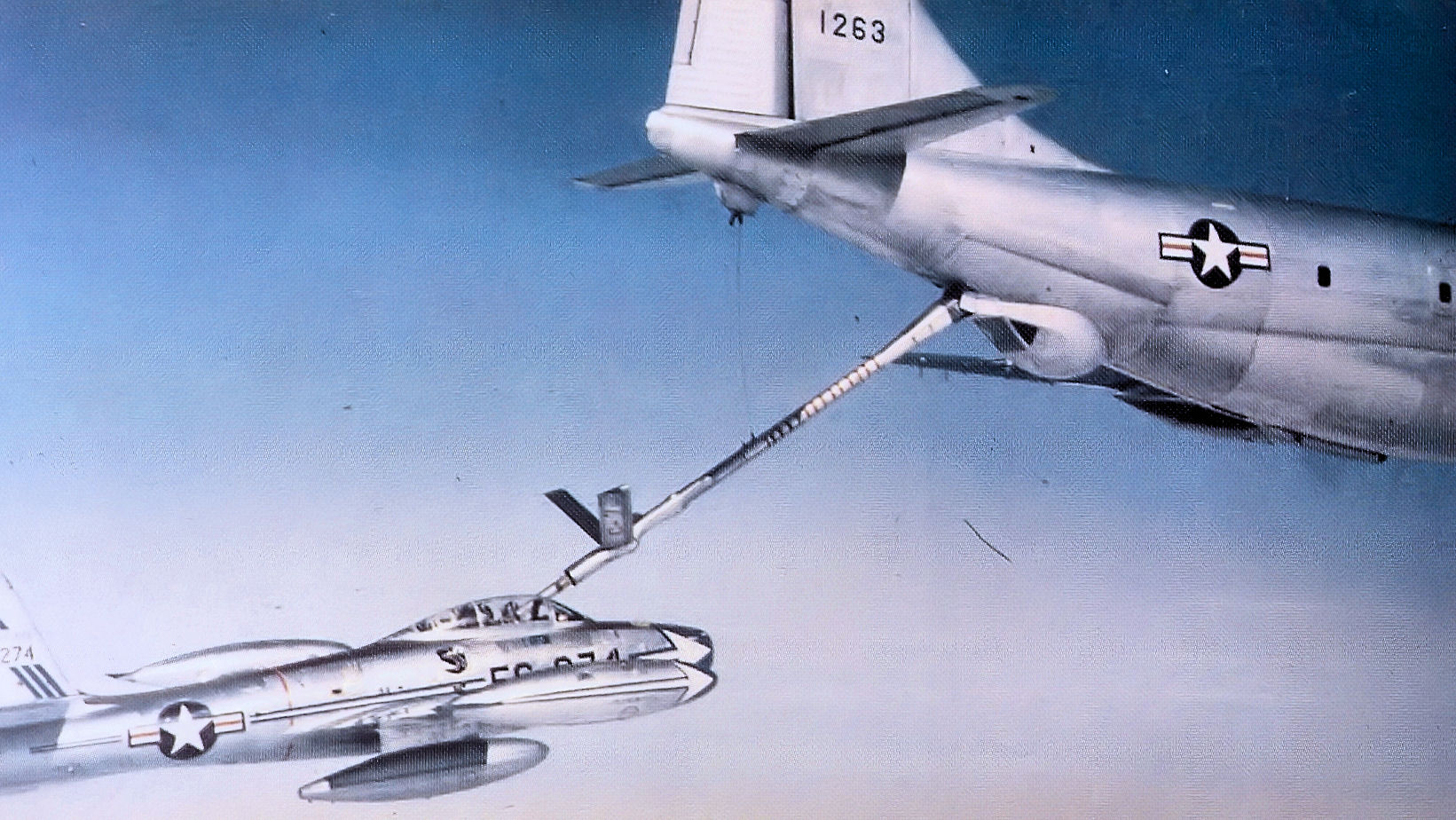
- 508th Strategic Fighter Wing F-84 Thunderjet refueling from a KC-97 Stratofreighter (Note: Aircraft is Republic F-84G-20-RE Thunderjet, serial 51-1274 refueling from Boeing KC-97F-55-BO Stratofreighter, serial 51-263 in 1953.)
- Active: 1944–1945; 1952–1956
- Country: United States
- Branch: United States Air Force
- Role: Fighter
- Engagements: Asiatic-Pacific Theater without inscription

Insignia
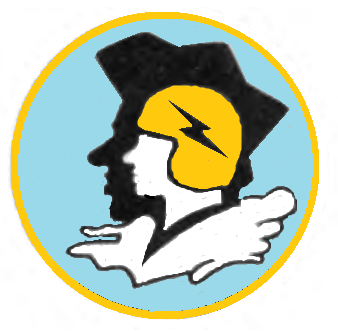
- 467 Strategic Fighter Sq emblem (Note: Approved 11 January 1956.)

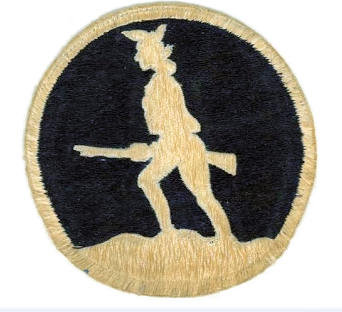
- 467th Fighter-Escort Squadron emblem

The 467th Strategic Fighter Squadron is an inactive United States Air Force unit. Its last assignment was with the 508th Strategic Fighter Wing at Turner Air Force Base, Georgia, where it was inactivated on 11 May 1956.

== History ==
=== World War II ===
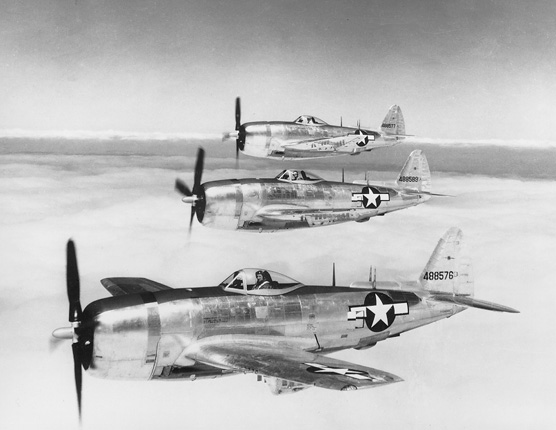
P-47N Thunderbolt as flown by the squadron

Formed in late 1944 under Second Air Force as one of the last Republic P-47 Thunderbolt fighter squadrons, programmed for deployment to Western Pacific theater with long-range P-47Ns for Boeing B-29 Superfortress escort missions. Arrived in Hawaii in early 1945, assigned to Seventh Air Force. Lack of a serious fighter defense over Japan at high altitudes and reprogramming of B-29 raids over Japan to night low-level fast attacks led to reassignment as a replacement training unit based in Hawaii; also performed air defense of the islands until inactivation in November 1945.

=== Strategic Air Command ===
Reactivated as Strategic Air Command fighter-escort squadron for Boeing B-50 Superfortress and Convair B-36 Peacemaker bombers. Performed fighter-escort training throughout the 1950s, inactivated in 1956 with the phaseout of the escort mission and retirement of the B-36.

== Lineage ==
- Constituted as the 467th Fighter Squadron on 5 October 1944

Activated on 12 October 1944.
Inactivated on 25 November 1945

- Redesignated 467th Fighter-Escort Squadron on 19 June 1952

Activated on 1 July 1952
Redesignated 467th Strategic Fighter Squadron on 20 January 1953
Inactivated on 11 May 1956

=== Assignments ===
- 508th Fighter Group, 12 October 1944 – 25 November 1945
- 508th Fighter-Escort Wing (later 508th Strategic Fighter Wing), 1 July 1952 – 11 May 1956

=== Stations ===
- Peterson Field, Colorado, 12 October 1944
- Pocatello Army Air Field, Idaho, 25 October 1944
- Bruning Army Air Field, Nebraska, 15 November – 18 December 1944
- Kahuku Army Air Field, Hawaii, 6 January 1945
- Mokuleia Airfield, Hawaii, 3 March 1945
- Bellows Field, Hawaii, 16 September – 25 November 1945
- Turner Air Force Base, Georgia, 1 July 1952 – 11 May 1956

=== Aircraft ===
- Republic P-47 Thunderbolt, 1944–1945
- Republic F-84 Thunderjet, 1952–1956
