= 466th Fighter Squadron =

466th Fighter Squadron

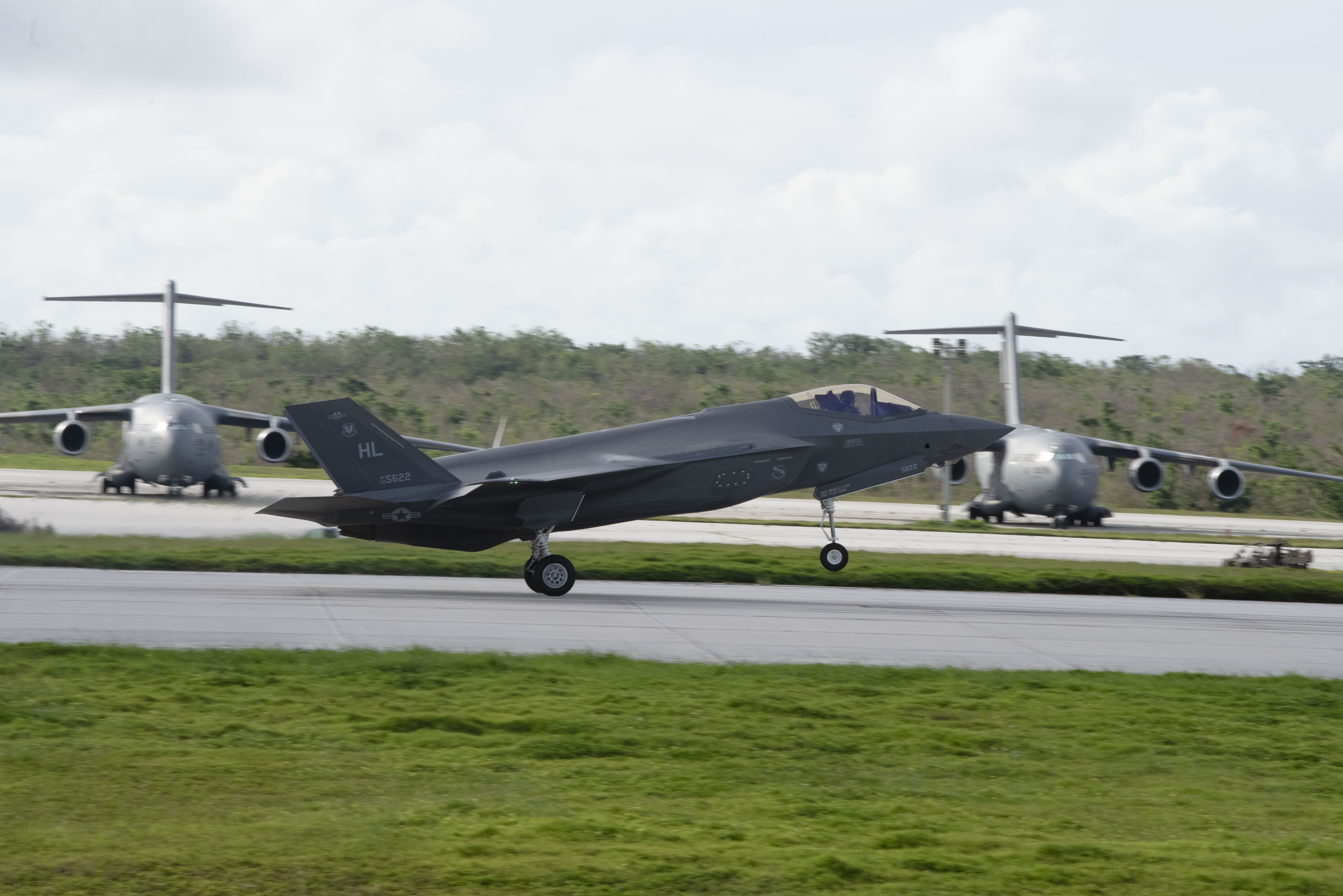
- Squadron F-35A lands at Andersen Air Force Base in July 2023
- Active: 1944–1945; 1952–1956; 1972–present
- Country: United States
- Branch: United States Air Force
- Role: Fighter
- Part of: Air Force Reserve Command
- Garrison/HQ: Hill Air Force Base
- Nickname: Diamondbacks
- Decorations: Air Force Outstanding Unit Award

Commanders
- Current commander: Lt. Col. Daniel Ficklin

Insignia
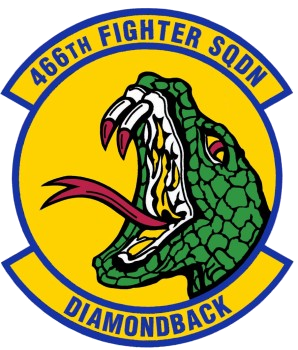
- 466th Fighter Squadron emblem (approved 29 March 1995)

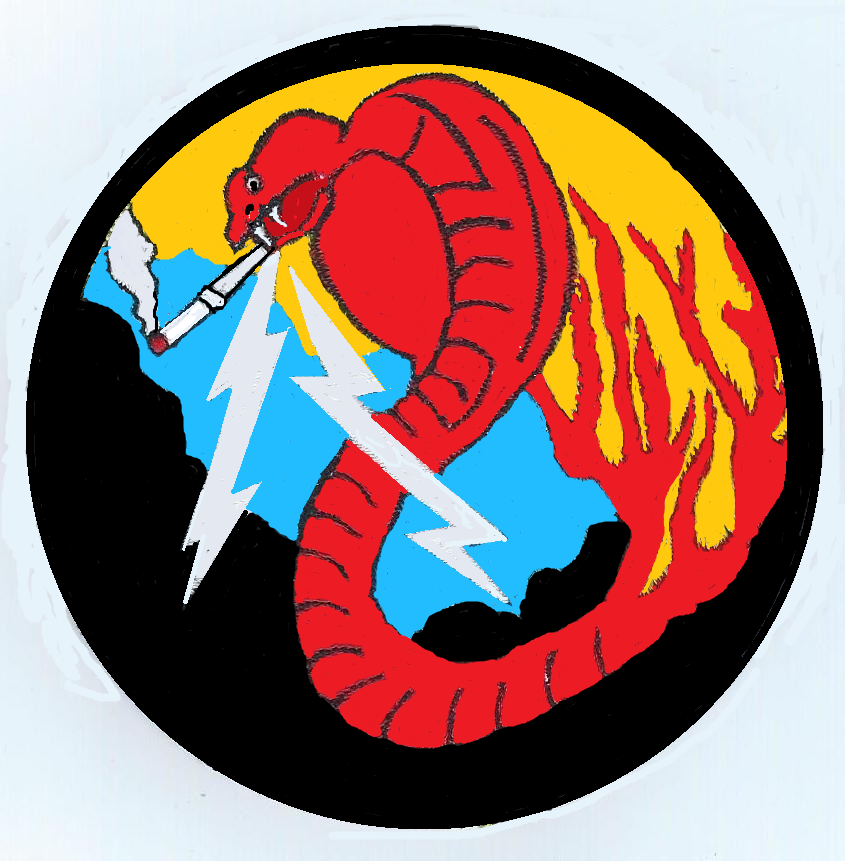
- 466th Strategic Fighter Squadron emblem (approved 23 September 1953)

The 466th Fighter Squadron is the 419th Fighter Wing's operational flying squadron. It is located at Hill Air Force Base, Utah.

The squadron was activated late in World War II. Intended as a long-range escort unit, it deployed to the Pacific, but remained in Hawaii until it was inactivated after VJ Day. The squadron was reactivated in 1952 as the 466th Fighter-Escort Squadron, but was inactivated in 1956, when the concept of fighters escorting formations of bombers no longer jibed with United States military thinking.

== Overview ==
The 419th formerly flew 15 F-16C/D model aircraft, which are light, air-to-air daytime fighters. In September of 2015 the 466th received its first F35A, which is a multi-role, combat capable fighter. The 466th Fighter Squadron first saw action in 1998, participating in Exercise Cope Tiger. This is a drill which puts reserve pilots shoulder to shoulder with members of the Thailand and Singapore Air Forces. Later that year, the 466th was deployed to Kuwait in time for Operation Southern Watch. The 466th was part of a unit attempting to hold off Iraqi movements toward Kuwaiti and Saudi Arabia.

== History ==
=== World War II ===
Formed in late 1944 under Second Air Force as one of the last Republic P-47 Thunderbolt fighter squadrons, programmed for deployment to Western Pacific theater with long-range P-47N for Boeing B-29 Superfortress escort missions. Arrived in Hawaii in early 1945, assigned to Seventh Air Force. Lack of a serious fighter defense over Japan at high altitudes and reprogramming of B-29 raids over Japan to night low-level fast attacks led to reassignment as an air defense and training unit in Hawaii.

=== Early Cold War fighter escort ===
Reactivated as the 466th Fighter-Escort Squadron to accompany formations of Strategic Air Command Boeing B-50 Superfortress and Convair B-36 Peacemaker bombers. Twice deployed to Japan to augment air defense forces there. Inactivated in 1956 with the phaseout of the escort mission and retirement of the B-36.

=== Reserve fighter operations ===
Activated again in the reserve as the 466th Tactical Fighter Squadron in 1972 as a Republic F-105 Thunderchief squadron, being equipped with aircraft returned from inactivated Vietnam War squadrons. Since 1984 has trained to fly interdiction, close air support, and counter-air missions. Deployed periodically for contingency operations, or for training exercises with other units.

The 466th Fighter Squadron transitioned in 1983, becoming the first Air Force Reserve Unit to fly and maintain the F-16. The squadron went on to earn top-honors at Gunsmoke (aerial gunnery competition) shortly after.

In 1994, the squadron deployed to Incirlik Air Base, Turkey to support Operation Northern Watch. In 1998, the unit deployed to Ahmad al-Jaber Air Base in support of Operation Southern Watch. During this deployment, the Diamondback's became the first F-16 squadron to employ precision-guided munitions in combat, and during Operation Northern Watch in 1999, they became the first F-16 squadron to utilize the AN/AAQ-28 Litening targeting pod in a combat theater.

In 2007, the implementation of the Air Force's Total Force Integration initiative would lead to the merging of the 388th Fighter Wing and 419th Fighter Wing's F-16s, aiming to cost-effectively enhance the strength of both the active duty wing and the reserve wing.

Following the implementation of TFI, the 466th Fighter Squadron has trained regularly with the squadrons of the 388th Fighter Wing. The two wings have deployed on numerous Operation Iraqi Freedom, Operation Enduring Freedom, and Operation Freedom's Sentinel, and Resolute Support Missions. The two wings regularly frequent Theater Security Package deployments to Kunsan Air Base.

The first F-35A arrived at the unit in September 2015. In 2017, following a deployment to Spain, the Diamondback's F-16s were moved to Holloman Air Force Base. During the transition, the wing deployed to Norway in partnership with the 388th Fighter Wing. The F-35 transition was completed in September 2017.

== Lineage ==
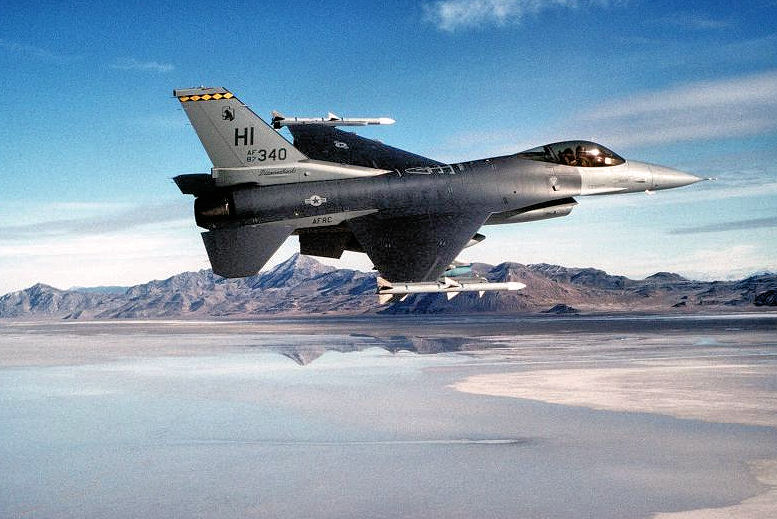
466th Fighter Squadron F-16C Fighting Falcon over the Great Salt Lake (Note: Aircraft is General Dynamics F-16C Block 30J Fighting Falcon serial 87-340 flying a training mission. The 466th is the only Air Force reserve fighter squadron in Utah. This image was used in the April 2000 Airman Magazine article, "High-fivin' 'n' Huggin'" and was taken on 1 April 2000)

- Constituted as the 466th Fighter Squadron on 5 October 1944

Activated on 12 October 1944
Inactivated on 25 November 1945

- Redesignated 466th Fighter-Escort Squadron on 19 June 1952

Activated on 1 July 1952
Redesignated 466th Strategic Fighter Squadron on 20 January 1953
Inactivated on 11 May 1956

- Redesignated 466th Tactical Fighter Squadron on 23 June 1972

Activated in the reserve on 1 January 1973
Redesignated 466th Fighter Squadron on 1 February 1992

=== Assignments ===
- 508th Fighter Group, 12 October 1944 – 25 November 1945
- 508th Fighter-Escort Wing (later 508th Strategic Fighter Wing), 1 July 1952 – 11 May 1956 (not operational until September 1952)
- 508th Tactical Fighter Group, 1 January 1973
- 301st Tactical Fighter Wing, 25 March 1973
- 508th Tactical Fighter Group, 17 October 1975
- 419th Tactical Fighter Wing (later 419th Fighter Wing), 1 October 1982
- 419th Operations Group, 1 August 1992 – present

=== Stations ===
- Peterson Field, Colorado, 12 October 1944
- Pocatello Army Air Field, Idaho, 25 October 1944
- Bruning Army Air Field, Nebraska, 15 November – 18 December 1944
- Kahuku Army Air Base, Hawaii, 6 January 1945
- Mokuleia Army Air Base, Hawaii, 25 February 1945
- Bellows Field, Hawaii, 16 September – 25 November 1945
- Turner Air Force Base, Georgia, 1 July 1952 – 11 May 1956 (deployed to Misawa Air Base, Japan, 8 February – 5 May 1953 and 16 February – 16 May 1954)
- Hill Air Force Base, Utah, 1 January 1973 – present

=== Aircraft ===
- Republic P-47 Thunderbolt, 1944–1945
- Republic F-84 Thunderjet, 1952–1956
- Republic F-105 Thunderchief, 1973–1984
- Lockheed T-33 T-Bird, 1973–1980
- General Dynamics F-16 Fighting Falcon 1984–2017
- Lockheed Martin F-35A Lightning II 2015–present
