= 468th Strategic Fighter Squadron =

468th Tactical Fighter Squadron
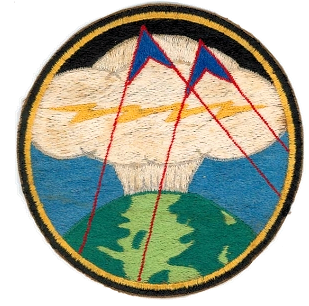
- Emblem of the 468th Strategic Fighter Squadron
- Active: 1944–1956
- Country: United States
- Branch: United States Army Air Forces
- Role: Fighter

The 468th Strategic Fighter Squadron is an inactive United States Air Force unit. Its last assignment was with the 508th Strategic Fighter Wing, based at Turner AFB, Georgia. It was inactivated on 11 May 1956.

== History ==
Formed in late 1944 under Second Air Force as one of the last P-47 Thunderbolt Fighter Squadrons, programmed for deployment to Western Pacific theater with long-range P-47N for B-29 Superfortress escort missions. Arrived in Hawaii in early 1945, assigned to Seventh Air Force. Lack of a serious fighter defense over Japan at high altitudes and reprogramming of B-29 raids over Japan to night low-level fast attacks led to reassignment as a replacement training unit based in Hawaii; also performed air defense of the islands until inactivation in November 1945.

Reactivated as Strategic Air Command fighter-escort squadron for B-50 Superfortress and B-36 Peacemaker bombers. Performed fighter-escort training throughout the 1950s, inactivated in 1956 with the phaseout of the escort mission and retirement of the B-36.

=== Lineage ===
- Constituted 468th Fighter Squadron on 5 October 1944

Activated on 12 October 1944.
Inactivated on 25 November 1945

- Redesignated 468th Fighter-Escort Squadron on 19 June 1952.

Activated on 1 July 1952
Redesignated 468th Strategic Fighter Squadron on 20 January 1953
Inactivated on 11 May 1956

=== Assignments ===
- 508th Fighter Group, 12 October 1944 – 25 November 1945
- 508th Fighter-Escort (later Strategic Fighter) Wing, 1 July 1952 – 11 May 1956 (not operational, 1 July–September 1952)

=== Stations ===
- Peterson Field, Colorado, 12 October 1944
- Pocatello Army Airfield, Idaho, 25 October 1944
- Bruning Army Airfield, Nebraska, 15 November-18 December 1944
- Kahuku Army Airfield, Hawaii Territory, 6 January 1945
- Mokuleia Army Airfield, Hawaii Territory, 25 February 1945
- Bellows Field, Hawaii Territory, 16 September-25 November 1945
- Turner AFB, Georgia, 1 July 1952 – 11 May 1956

=== Aircraft ===
- P-47 Thunderbolt, 1944–1945
- F-84 Thunderjet, 1952–1956
