= 508th Air Refueling Squadron =

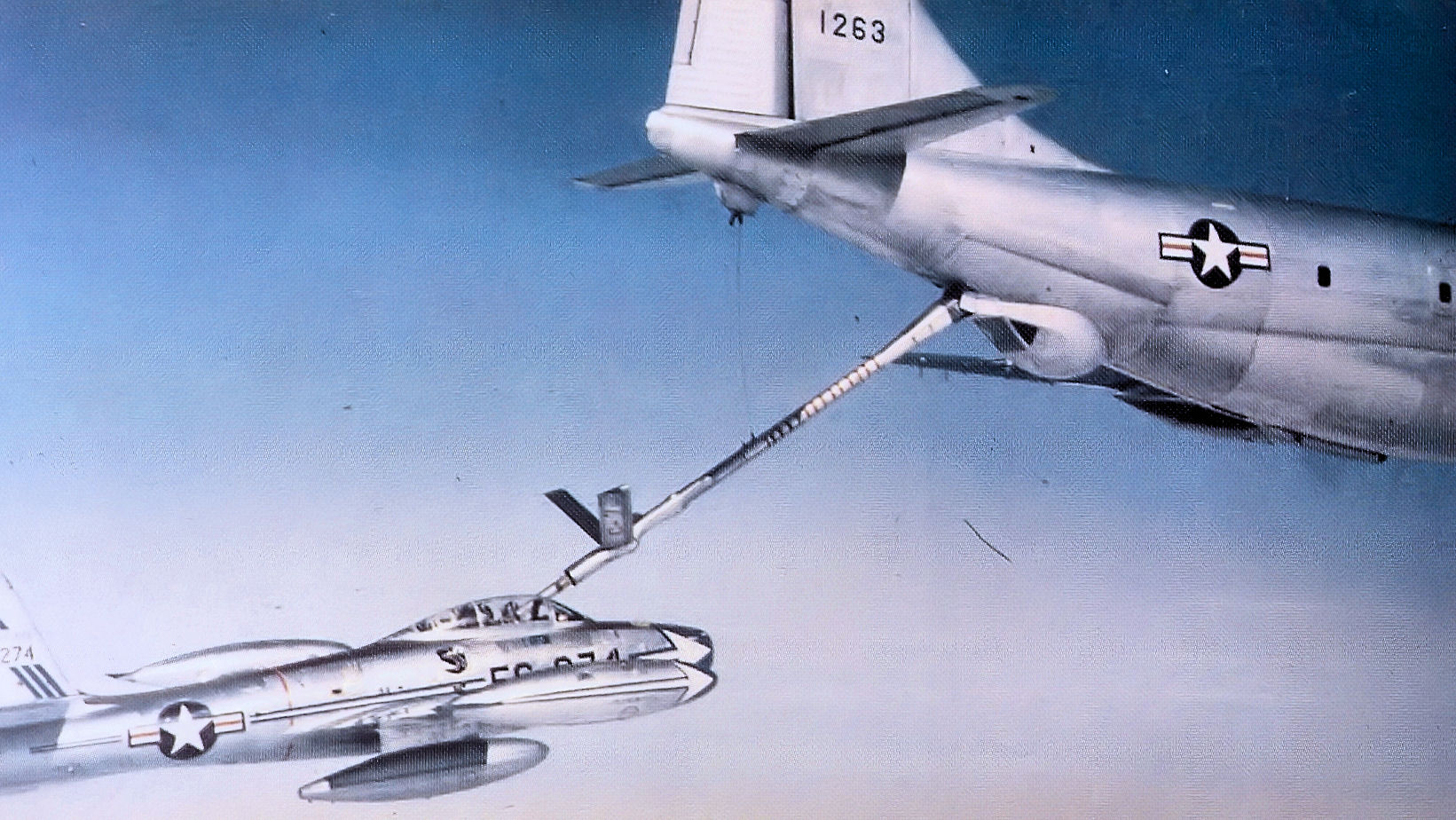
- 508th Strategic Fighter Wing F-84 and KC-97 refeuling (Note: Fighter is Republic F-84G-20-RE Thunderjet, serial 51-1274. Tanker is Boeing KC-97F-55-BO Stratofreighter, serial 51-263. Taken in 1953.)
- Active: 1943–1944; 1953–1957
- Country: United States
- Branch: United States Air Force
- Role: Aerial refueling

Insignia
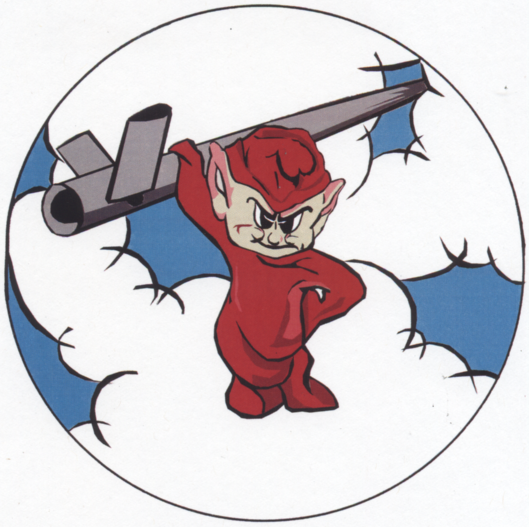
- 508th Air Refueling Squadron emblem

The 508th Air Refueling Squadron is an inactive United States Air Force unit. It was an air refueling unit that operated the Boeing KB-29 and Boeing KC-97 from at Turner Air Force Base, Georgia from 1953 to 1957.

In 1985, the squadron was consolidated with the 608th Bombardment Squadron, a World War II training unit of the Army Air Forces (AAF). The 608th was active from 1943 to 1944 training heavy bomber crews until it was disbanded in a general reorganization of AAF training and support units.

== History ==
=== World War II ===
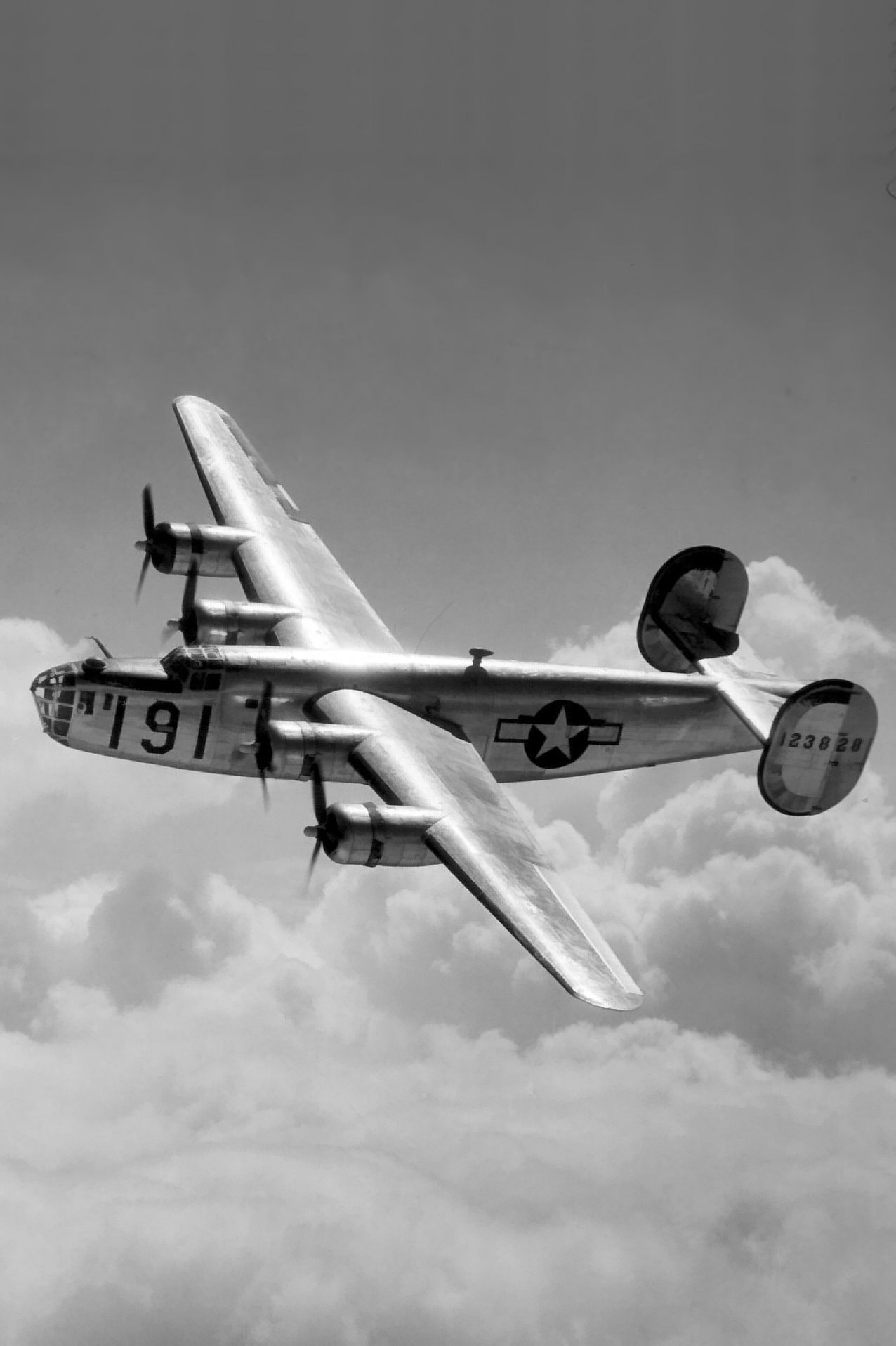
B-24 Liberator as flown by the 605th Squadron

The squadron's first predecessor was the 608th Bombardment Squadron, which was activated at Pyote Army Air Base, Texas on 1 March 1943, but made four moves before the end of the year. The squadron was one of the four original squadrons of the 400th Bombardment Group. It served as an Operational Training Unit (OTU) for Consolidated B-24 Liberator units until December. The OTU program involved the use of an oversized parent unit to provide cadres to "satellite groups"

In December, the squadron moved to Charleston Army Air Base, South Carolina, where it became a Replacement Training Unit (RTU). Like OTUs, RTUs were oversize units, however their mission was to train individual pilots and aircrews. With this mission change, the 400th Group and its components were reassigned from Second Air Force to First Air Force.

However, the Army Air Forces was finding that standard military units like the 605th, which were assigned personnel and equipment based on relatively inflexible tables of organization were not proving well adapted to the training mission. Accordingly, it adopted a more functional system in which each base was organized into a separate numbered unit, which was manned and equipped based on the station's requirements. The 608th Squadron was disbanded, and along with operational and supporting units at Charleston was used to form the 113th AAF Base Unit (Bombardment (Heavy)).

=== Air refueling ===
The squadron was established in 1953 to provide strategic air refueling for the 508th Strategic Fighter Wing. In 1956, the 508th Wing was inactivated and the squadron transferred to SAC's other fighter wing at Turner, the 31st Strategic Fighter Wing. In April 1957, the 31st Wing transferred to Tactical Air Command, which moved the 431st Air Refueling Squadron to Turner. The 508th began transferring its planes to the 431st as it prepared for it inactivation in July.

== Lineage ==
608th Bombardment Squadron

- Constituted as the 608th Bombardment Squadron (Heavy) on 15 February 1943

Activated on 1 March 1943

- Disbanded on 10 April 1944
- Reconstituted on 19 September 1985 and consolidated with the 508th Air Refueling Squadron as the 508th Air Refueling Squadron

508th Air Refueling Squadron

- Constituted as the 508th Air Refueling Squadron, Strategic Fighter ca 4 November 1953

Activated on 25 November 1953
Inactivated 1 July 1957

- Consolidated with the 608th Bombardment Squadron on 19 September 1985 as the 508th Air Refueling Squadron, Heavy (remained inactive)

=== Assignments ===
- 400th Bombardment Group: 1 March 1943 – 10 April 1944
- 508th Strategic Fighter Wing: 25 November 1953 (attached to 31st Strategic Fighter Wing 10 February 1954 – 1 June 1954, unknown 4 July 1954 – 15 October 1954)
- 31st Strategic Fighter Wing: 11 May 1956
- 4050th Air Refueling Wing: 1 April 1957 – 1 July 1957

=== Stations ===
- Pyote Army Air Base, Texas, 1 March 1943
- Davis–Monthan Field, Arizona, 11 April 1943
- Pueblo Army Air Base, Colorado, c. 2 May 1943
- Smoky Hill Army Air Field, Kansas, 31 July 1943
- Alamogordo Army Air Field, New Mexico, 14 September 1943
- Charleston Army Air Base, South Carolina, 15 December 1943 – 10 April 1944
- Turner Air Force Base, Georgia, 25 November 1953 – 1 July 1957

=== Aircraft ===
- Consolidated B-24 Liberator, 1943–1944
- Boeing KB-29 Superfortress, 1953-unknown
- Boeing KC-97 Stratofreighter, unknown-1957

=== Awards and campaigns ===
Campaign Streamer	Campaign	Dates	Notes
	American Theater without inscription	1 March 1943 – 10 April 1944	608th Bombardment Squadron
