= 400th Bombardment Group =

400th Bombardment Group (later 400th Tactical Missile Wing)
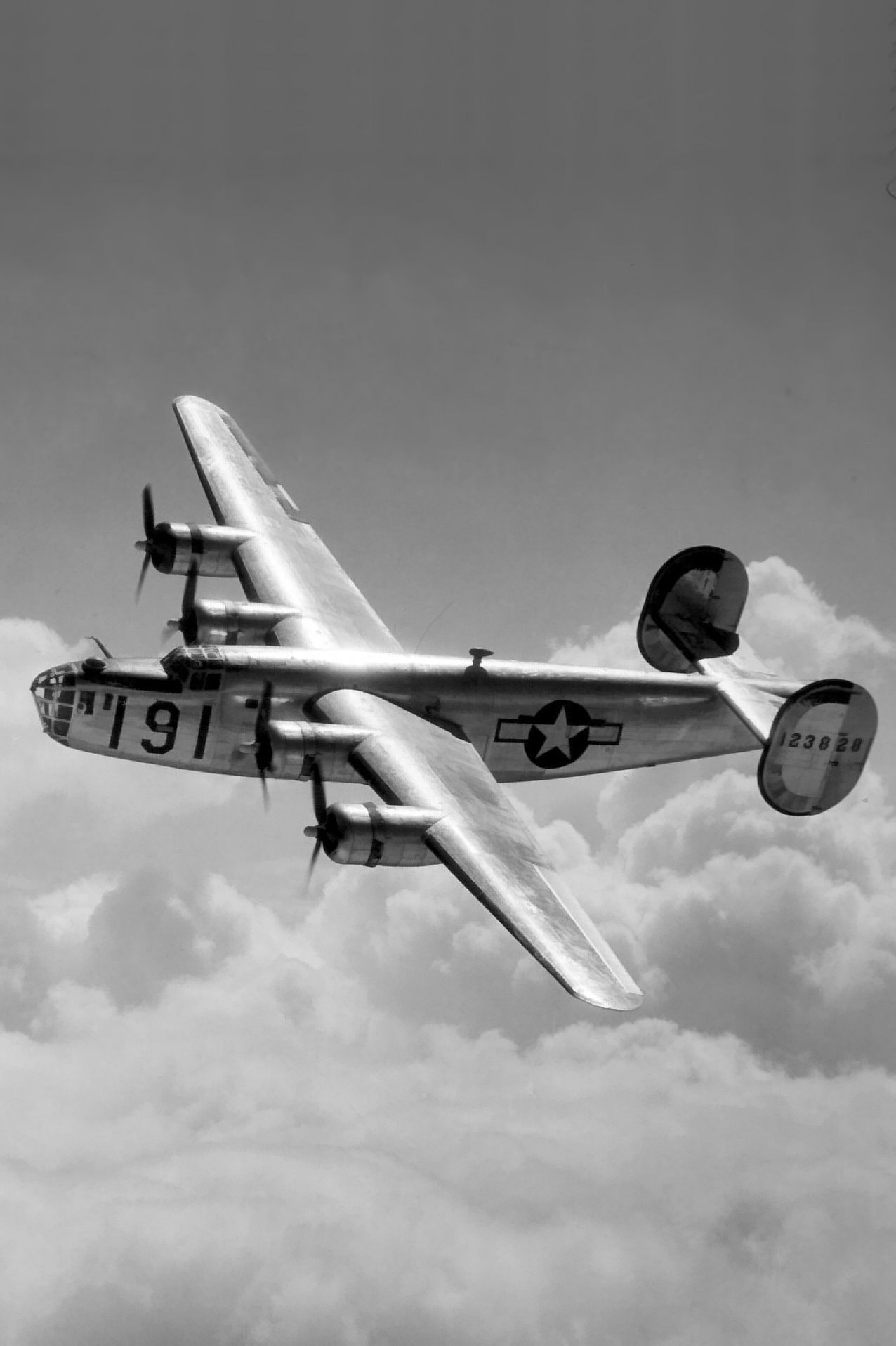
- B-24 Liberator as flown by the 400th Group
- Active: 1943–1944
- Country: United States
- Branch: United States Air Force
- Role: heavy bomber training

Insignia
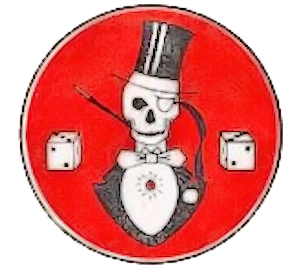
- 400th Bombardment Group emblem "Duke the Spook"

The 400th Tactical Missile Wing is an inactive United States Air Force unit. It was last active as the 400th Bombardment Group, a World War II Consolidated B-24 Liberator Replacement Training Unit. The unit was disbanded in 1944 in a general reorganization of Army Air Forces training units. It was reconstituted as a missile wing in 1985, but has not been active since then.

== History ==
The group was activated as the 400th Bombardment Group, at Pyote Army Air Base, Texas on 1 March 1943, but made four moves before the end of the year. it was composed of the 608th, 609th, 610th and 611th Bombardment Squadrons. It served as an Operational Training Unit (OTU) for Consolidated B-24 Liberator units until December.

The OTU program involved the use of an oversized parent unit to provide cadres to “satellite groups" The OTU program was patterned after the unit training system of the Royal Air Force. It then assumed responsibility for training these new groups and oversaw their expansion with graduates of Army Air Forces Training Command schools to become effective combat units. Phase I training concentrated on individual training in crewmember specialties. Phase II training emphasized the coordination for the crew to act as a team. The final phase concentrated on operation as a unit.

In December, the group moved to Charleston Army Air Base, South Carolina, where it became a Replacement Training Unit (RTU). Like OTUs, RTUs were oversize units, however their mission was to train individual pilots and aircrews. By the beginning of 1944, most (90%) of the AAF's combat units had been activated and almost three quarters of them had deployed overseas. With the exception of special programs, like forming Boeing B-29 Superfortress units, training “fillers” for existing units became more important than unit training. With this mission change, the 400th Group and its components were reassigned from Second Air Force to First Air Force.

However, the Army Air Forces was finding that standard military units like the 400th, which were assigned personnel and equipment based on relatively inflexible tables of organization were not proving well adapted to the training mission. Accordingly, it adopted a more functional system in which each base was organized into a separate numbered unit, which was manned and equipped based on the station's requirements. Groups like the 400th Group serving as RTUs disbanded, and along with operational and supporting units at Charleston, was used to form the 113th AAF Base Unit (Bombardment (Heavy)).

The group was reconstituted in July 1985 as the 400th Tactical Missile Wing, but has not been active since.

== Lineage ==
- Constituted as the 400th Bombardment Group (Heavy) on 15 February 1943

Activated on 1 March 1943
Disbanded on 10 April 1944

- Reconstituted and redesignated 400th Tactical Missile Wing on 31 July 1985

=== Assignments ===
- Second Air Force, 1 March 1943
- First Air Force, 15 December 1943 – 10 April 1944

=== Components ===
- 608th Bombardment Squadron: 1 March 1943 – 10 April 1944
- 609th Bombardment Squadron: 1 March 1943 – 10 April 1944
- 610th Bombardment Squadron: 1 March 1943 – 10 April 1944
- 611th Bombardment Squadron: 1 March 1943 – 10 April 1944

=== Stations ===
- Pyote Army Air Base, Texas, 1 March 1943
- Davis-Monthan Field, Arizona, April 1943
- Pueblo Army Air Field, Colorado, c. 2 May 1943
- Salina Army Air Field, Kansas, 31 July 1943 – 19 September 1943
- Alamogordo Army Airfield, New Mexico, 19 September 1943
- Charleston Army Air Field, South Carolina, 15 December 1943 – 10 April 1944

=== Aircraft ===
- Consolidated B-24 Liberator, 1943–1944

=== Awards and campaigns ===
Campaign Streamer	Campaign	Dates	Notes
	American Theater without inscription	1 March 1943 – 10 April 1944	400th Bombardment Group
