= 509th Weapons Squadron =

509th Weapons Squadron

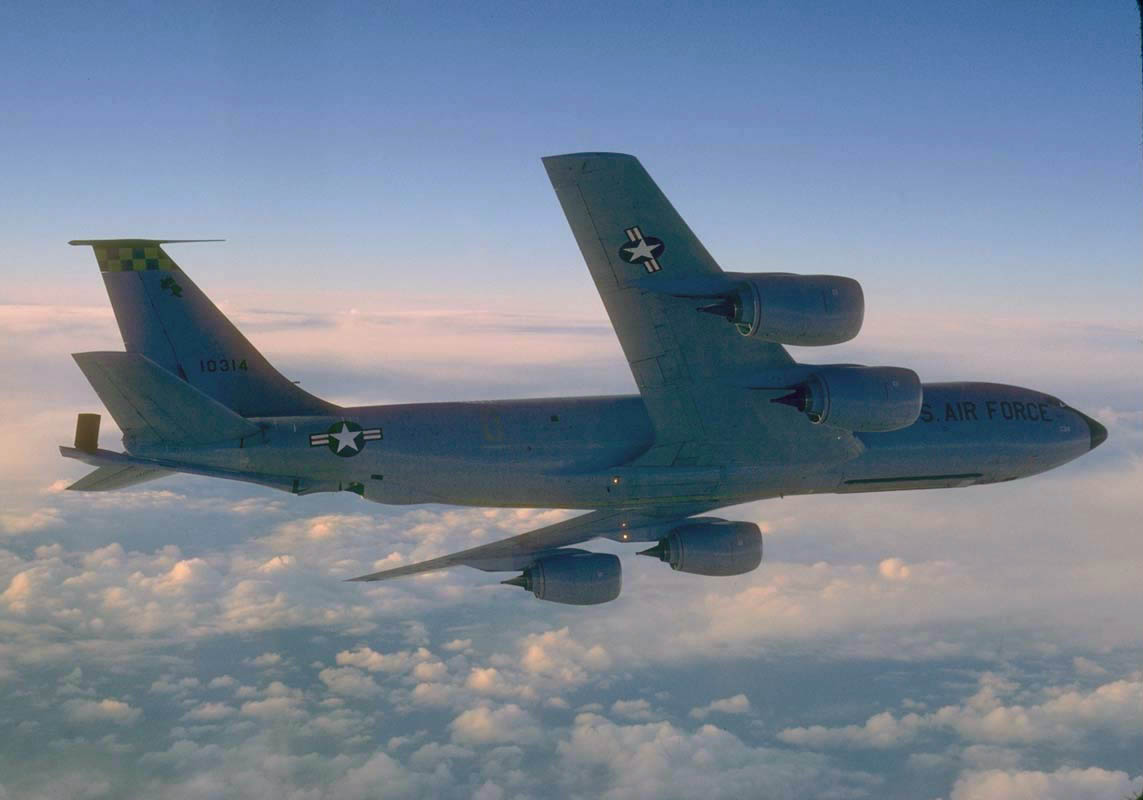
- KC-135 Stratotanker stationed at Fairchild AFB
- Active: 1943–1944; 1948–1965; 1966–1994; 2003 – present
- Country: United States
- Branch: United States Air Force
- Type: Squadron
- Role: Advanced air refueling training
- Part of: Air Combat Command
- Garrison/HQ: Fairchild Air Force Base, Washington
- Engagements: World War II (American Theater); Gulf War (Defense of Saudi Arabia; Liberation of Kuwait)
- Decorations: Air Force Outstanding Unit Award with Combat "V" Device; Air Force Outstanding Unit Award; Republic of Vietnam Gallantry Cross with Palm

Insignia
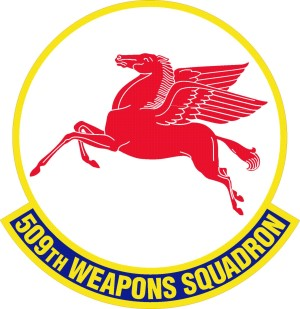
- 509th Weapons Squadron emblem

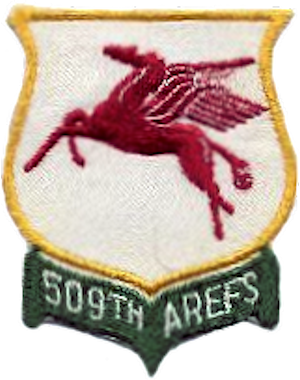
- 509th Air Refueling Squadron emblem (Note: Approved 15 September 1957.)

The 509th Weapons Squadron is a United States Air Force unit. It is assigned to the USAF Weapons School at Fairchild Air Force Base, Washington. The squadron is a geographically separated unit of the 57th Wing at Nellis Air Force Base, Nevada.

The squadron's first predecessor is the 609th Bombardment Squadron, which served as a heavy bomber training unit during World War II until it was disbanded in a general reorganization of Army Air Forces training and support units in the United States in 1944. The second predecessor is the 509th Air Refueling Squadron, which was one of the first refueling units in the Air Force and deployed planes and Aircrews to support strike forces in the Vietnam War and during Desert Storm.

== Mission ==
The mission of the squadron is to provide Boeing KC-135 Stratotanker instructional flying.

== History ==
=== World War II ===
The squadron was first activated as the 609th Bombardment Squadron, one of the four original squadrons of the 400th Bombardment Group, at Pyote Army Air Base, Texas, in March 1943. The group was equipped with Consolidated B-24 Liberators and served under Second Air Force as an Operational Training Unit (OTU) at several bases in the southwestern United States until the end of the year. The OTU program involved the use of an oversized parent unit to provide cadres to "satellite groups".

The unit moved to Charleston Army Air Field, South Carolina in late December, where it became part of First Air Force and changed its mission to that of a Replacement Training Unit (RTU). RTUs units were likewise oversize units, but their mission was to train aircrews prior to their deployment to combat theaters. However, the Army Air Forces found that standard military units, based on relatively inflexible tables of organization, were proving less well adapted to the training mission. Accordingly, it adopted a more functional system in which each base was organized into a separate numbered unit. while the groups and squadrons acting as RTUs were disbanded or inactivated. This resulted in the 609th, along with other units at Charleston, being disbanded in April 1944 and being replaced by the 113th AAF Base Unit (Bombardment (Heavy)), which assumed the squadron's mission, personnel, and equipment.

=== Cold War ===
The 509th Air Refueling Squadron was activated at Roswell Air Force Base, New Mexico and assigned to the 509th Bombardment Group. The squadron was one of two air refueling units in the United States Air Force, activated on 12 July 1948. The 509th Air Refueling Squadron and 43rd Air Refueling Squadron were the first air refueling squadrons in the Air Force. The squadron initially equipped with Boeing KB-29M Superfortress tankers. These aircraft carried a system of hoses, reels, winches and fuel pumps to transfer fuel to the receiver aircraft. A power-driven reel for the refueling hose was installed in the rear fuselage at the position where the lower aft turret had been located prior to its removal. The KB-29M also had a cable and associated winch (known as the contact line) that was used to assist in the setup of the connection between the two aircraft.

Although the hose refueling system proved to be feasible, in practice the system had the disadvantage in taking a long time to make the contact and engage the hoses. Once contact was made, the rate of fuel transfer was slow, and the hoses provided a lot of aerodynamic drag which limited the airspeed. Consequently, the hose system was used for only a few years before it was replaced by the Boeing-developed flying boom system installed on the KB-29L. While flying the KB-29 the squadron deployed to RAF Upper Heyford, England from June to September 1952.

In 1954, the squadron converted to the Boeing KC-97 Stratofreighter, deploying once again to the United Kingdom with the KC-97 for most of the first four months of 1956, this time to RAF Lakenheath. The squadron moved to Pease Air Force Base, New Hampshire in January 1958, but was not joined there by the rest of the 509th Bombardment Wing until July. The squadron was inactivated in 1965 as the 509th phased down in preparation for inactivation. (Note: Although the decision to inactivate the wing was reversed and it instead converted from B-47s to B-52s, a new KC-135 squadron became the wing's refueling element. Ravenstein, pp. 276–277.)

The squadron was activated again in June 1966, with Boeing KC-135 Stratotankers, when the 509th wing expanded its refueling capability by adding a second squadron of tankers to those of the 34th Air Refueling Squadron at Pease. It continued to fly the KC-135 until inactivated in 1994 at Griffiss Air Force Base, New York.

=== Weapons training ===
The squadron was reactivated in 1999 at Fairchild Air Force Base, Washington, initially as the KC-135 Combat Employment School of Air Mobility Command's Air Mobility Warfare Center based at McGuire Air Force Base, New Jersey. Its first student class began in June 2000. In 2006, the Air Force consolidated all weapons squadrons under the United States Air Force Weapons School under the 57th Wing at Nellis Air Force Base, Nevada. In six months of training, weapons upgrade students receive graduate-level training in air refueling core competencies and learn to integrate and plan for joint operations. The students went to Nellis three times to receive "core" classes with the rest of the weapons school. They deployed on temporary duty assignments for terminal approach tactics at Roswell, New Mexico; participated in United States Strategic Command integration at Offutt Air Force Base, Nebraska; certify in special operations air refueling at Hurlburt Field, Florida; and exercise with Northrop Grumman B-2 Spirits at Whiteman Air Force Base, Missouri; and plan and execute a mission employment exercise from Nellis two weeks before graduation.

== Lineage ==
609th Bombardment Squadron

- Constituted as the 609th Bombardment Squadron (Heavy) on 15 February 1943

Activated on 1 March 1943
Disbanded on 10 April 1944

- Reconstituted and consolidated with the 509th Air Refueling Squadron as the 509th Air Refueling Squadron, Medium on 19 September 1985

509th Weapons Squadron

- Constituted the 509th Air Refueling Squadron, Medium on 12 June 1948

Activated on 12 July 1948
Discontinued and inactivated on 25 June 1965

- Redesignated 509th Air Refueling Squadron, Heavy and activated, on 8 August 1966 (not organized)

Organized on 2 October 1966

- Consolidated with the 609th Bombardment Squadron on 19 September 1985

Redesignated 509th Air Refueling Squadron on 1 September 1991
Inactivated on 1 October 1994

- Redesignated 509th Weapons Squadron on 30 May 2003

Activated on 1 June 2003

=== Assignments ===
- 400th Bombardment Group, 1 March 1943 – 10 April 1944
- 509th Bombardment Group, 12 July 1948
- 509th Bombardment Wing, 16 June 1952
- 817th Air Division, 5 January 1958
- 509th Bombardment Wing, 8 July 1958 – 25 June 1965
- Strategic Air Command 8 August 1966 (not organized)
- 509th Bombardment Wing, 2 October 1966
- 416th Bombardment Wing, 1 July 1990
- 416th Operations Group, 1 September 1991
- 380th Operations Group, 1 June 1992 – 1 October 1994
- USAF Mobility Weapons School, 1 June 2003
- USAF Weapons School, 5 July 2006 – present

=== Stations ===
- Pyote Army Air Base, Texas, 1 March 1943
- Davis–Monthan Field, Arizona, 11 April 1943
- Pueblo Army Air Base, Colorado, c. 2 May 1943
- Smoky Hill Army Air Field, Kansas, 31 July 1943
- Albuquerque Army Air Base, New Mexico, 19 September 1943
- Charleston Army Air Field, South Carolina, 15 December 1943 – 10 April 1944
- Roswell Air Force Base (later Walker Air Force Base), New Mexico, 12 July 1948 (deployed at RAF Upper Heyford, England, 4 June – 3 September 1952, at RAF Lakenheath, England, 26 January – 1 May 1956)
- Pease Air Force Base, New Hampshire, 5 January 1958 – 25 June 1965
- Pease Air Force Base, New Hampshire, 2 October 1966
- Griffiss Air Force Base, New York, 1 July 1990 – 1 October 1994
- Fairchild Air Force Base, Washington, 1 June 2003 – present

=== Aircraft ===
- Consolidated B-24 Liberator, 1943–1944
- Boeing KB-29L/M Superfortress, 1948–1954
- Boeing KC-97F/G Stratotanker, 1954-1965-
- Boeing KC-135A/R/RT Stratotanker, 1966–1994
- Boeing KC-135R/T Stratotanker, 2003–present

=== Awards and campaigns ===
Award streamer	Award	Dates	Notes
	Air Force Outstanding Unit Award with Combat "V" Device	5 March 1969-2 June 1969	509th Air Refueling Squadron
	Air Force Outstanding Unit Award	1 April 1968-1 October 1968	509th Air Refueling Squadron
	Air Force Outstanding Unit Award	1 July 1979-30 June 1980	509th Air Refueling Squadron
	Air Force Outstanding Unit Award	1 July 1981-30 June 1982	509th Air Refueling Squadron
	Air Force Outstanding Unit Award	1 July 1982-30 June 1984	509th Air Refueling Squadron
	Air Force Outstanding Unit Award	1 July 1985-30 June 1987	509th Air Refueling Squadron
	Air Force Outstanding Unit Award with Combat "V" Device	1 July 1989-30 June 1991	509th Air Refueling Squadron
	Vietnamese Gallantry Cross with Palm	5 March 1969-2 June 1969	509th Air Refueling Squadron

Campaign Streamer	Campaign	Dates	Notes
	American Theater without inscription	1 March 1943 – 10 April 1944	609th Bombardment Squadron
	Defense of Saudi Arabia	2 August 1990 – 16 January 1991	509th Air Refueling Squadron
	Liberation and Defense of Kuwait	17 January 1991 – 11 April 1991	509th Air Refueling Squadron
