= Mokulēʻia, Hawaii =

Census-designated place in Hawaii, United States

Mokulēʻia
- Census-designated place
- Location in Honolulu County and the state of Hawaii
- Coordinates: 21°34′38″N 158°9′32″W
- Country: United States
- State: Hawaii
- Counties: Honolulu

Area
  - Total: 3.94 sq mi (10.21 km^{2})
  - Land: 2.71 sq mi (7.01 km^{2})
  - Water: 1.24 sq mi (3.20 km^{2})
- Elevation: 15 ft (4.6 m)

Population (2020)
  - Total: 1,816
  - Density: 670.8/sq mi (258.99/km^{2})
- ZIP code: 96791
- Area code: 808
- FIPS code: 15-52550

Mokulēʻia (Hawaiian pronunciation: [mokuleːˈʔijə]) is a North Shore community and census-designated place (CDP) in the Waialua District on the island of Oʻahu, City & County of Honolulu, Hawaiʻi, United States. Mokulēʻia means "isle [of] abundance" in Hawaiian. As of the 2020 census, the CDP had a population of 1,816. Features of interest here include Mokulēʻia Beach, Mokulēʻia Polo Field, and Dillingham Airfield, west of the town.

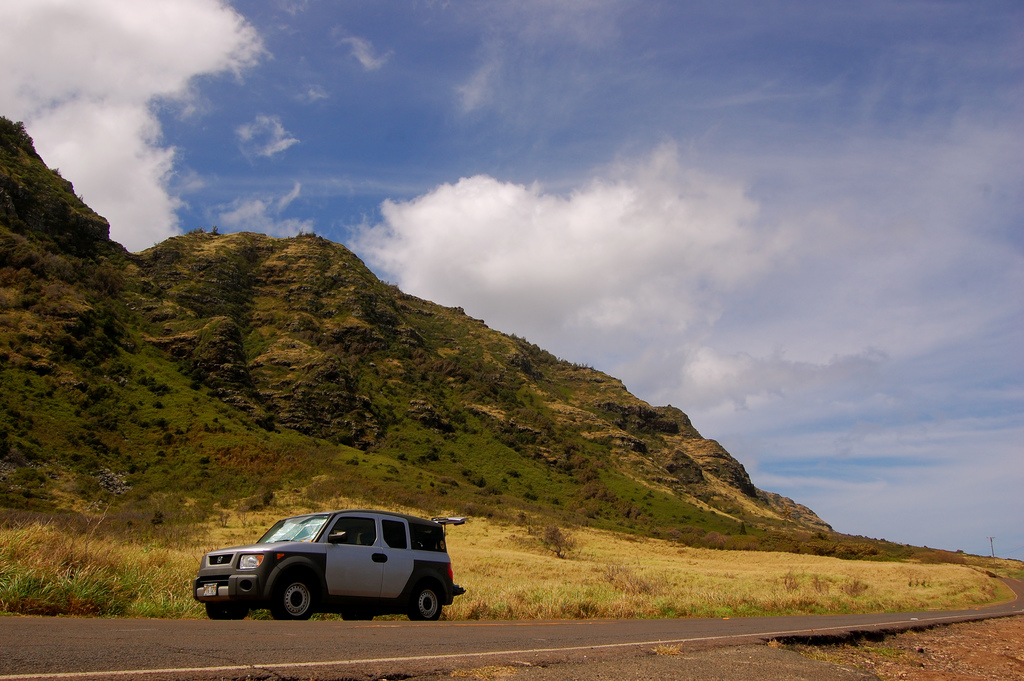
Mokuleia, Hawaii

At the western end of Farrington Highway, approximately 1-mile (1.6 km) beyond Dillingham Airfield entrance, begins the track (trail) to Kaʻena Point, the westernmost tip of Oʻahu.

The U.S. postal code for Mokulēʻia is 96791.

== Geography ==
Mokulēʻia is located at 21°34′38″N 158°9′32″W, immediately west of Waialua along Farrington Highway and State Rte. 82 (Waialua Beach Road).

According to the United States Census Bureau, the CDP has an area of 2.7 square miles (7.0 km^{2}), of which 1.5 square miles (3.8 km^{2}) is land and 1.2 square miles (3.2 km^{2}), or 45.86%, is water.

== Demographics ==
Historical population
Census	Pop.	Note	%±
2020	1,816		—
U.S. Decennial Census

At the 2000 census, there were 1,839 people, 709 households, and 384 families residing in Mokulēʻia. The population density was 923.2 inhabitants per square mile (356.4/km^{2}). There were 883 housing units at an average density of 443.3 per square mile (171.2/km^{2}). The racial makeup of the CDP was 57.21% White, 1.47% Black or African American, 0.27% Native American, 11.36% Asian, 5.60% Pacific Islander, 0.60% from other races, and 23.49% from two or more races. 7.29% of the population were Hispanic or Latino of any race.

Of the 709 households 25.7% had children under the age of 18 living with them, 37.8% were married couples living together, 11.4% had a female householder with no husband present, and 45.7% were non-families. 31.3% of households were one person and 2.5% were one person aged 65 or older. The average household size was 2.38 and the average family size was 3.04.

The age distribution was 21.5% under the age of 18, 16.1% from 18 to 24, 36.1% from 25 to 44, 20.3% from 45 to 64, and 6.0% 65 or older. The median age was 30. For every 100 females there were 134.0 males. For every 100 females age 18 and over, there were 139.7 males.

The median household income was $50,100 and the median family income was $57,917. Males had a median income of $36,458 versus $27,317 for females. The per capita income was $24,643. 10.7% of the population and 10.5% of families were below the poverty line. Of the total population, 15.1% of those under 18 and 7.8% of those 65 and older were living below the poverty line.
