= Boeing KB-29 Superfortress =

US heavy tanker aircraft with 4 piston engines, 1948

KB-29
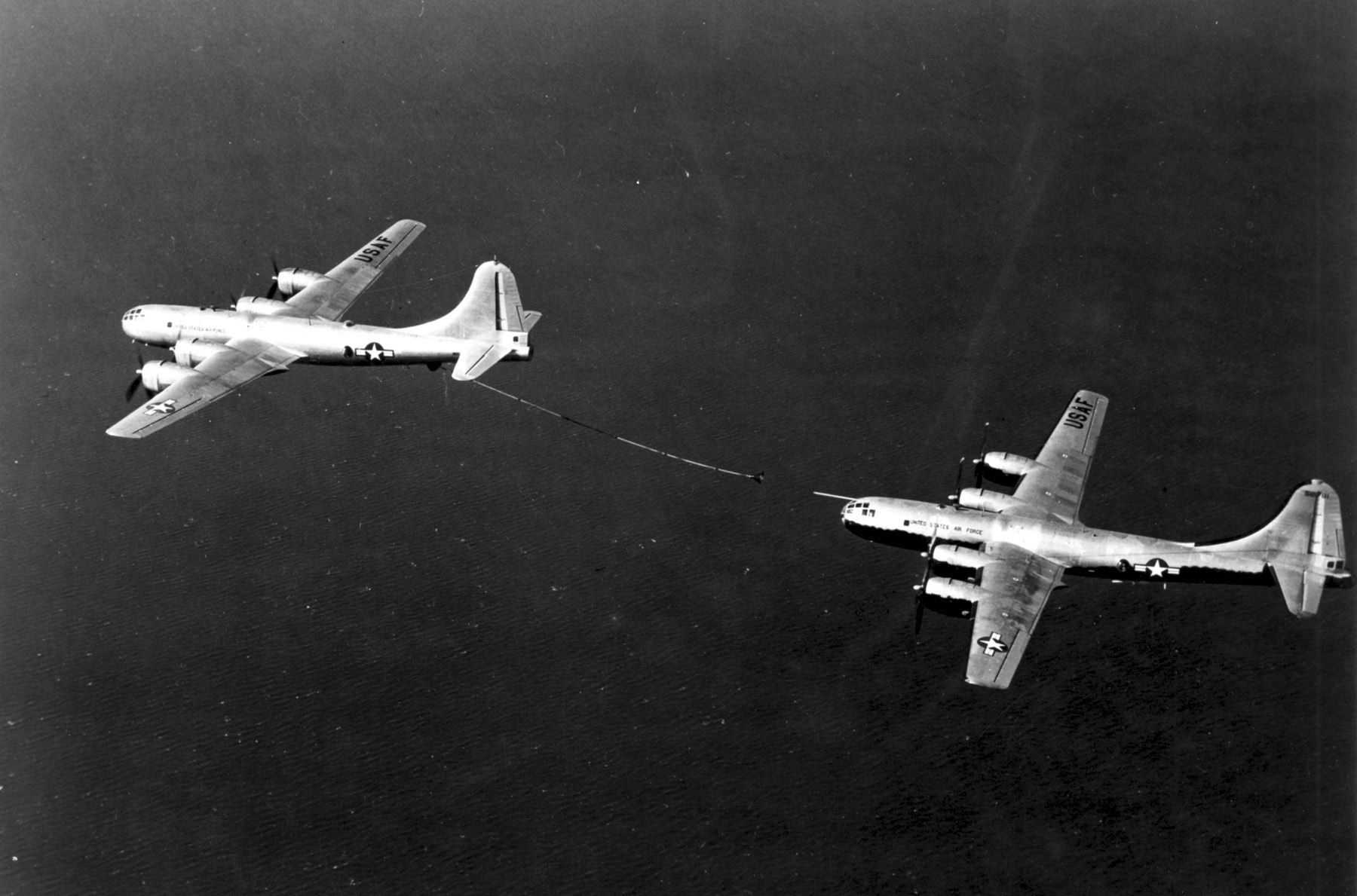
- KB-29M refueling KB-29MR

General information
- Type: Strategic Tanker
- Manufacturer: Boeing
- Status: retired
- Primary user: United States Air Force
- Number built: 282 total conversions

History
- Manufactured: 92 KB-29M, 74 KB-29MR, 116 KB-29P
- Introduction date: 1948
- Developed from: B-29 Superfortress

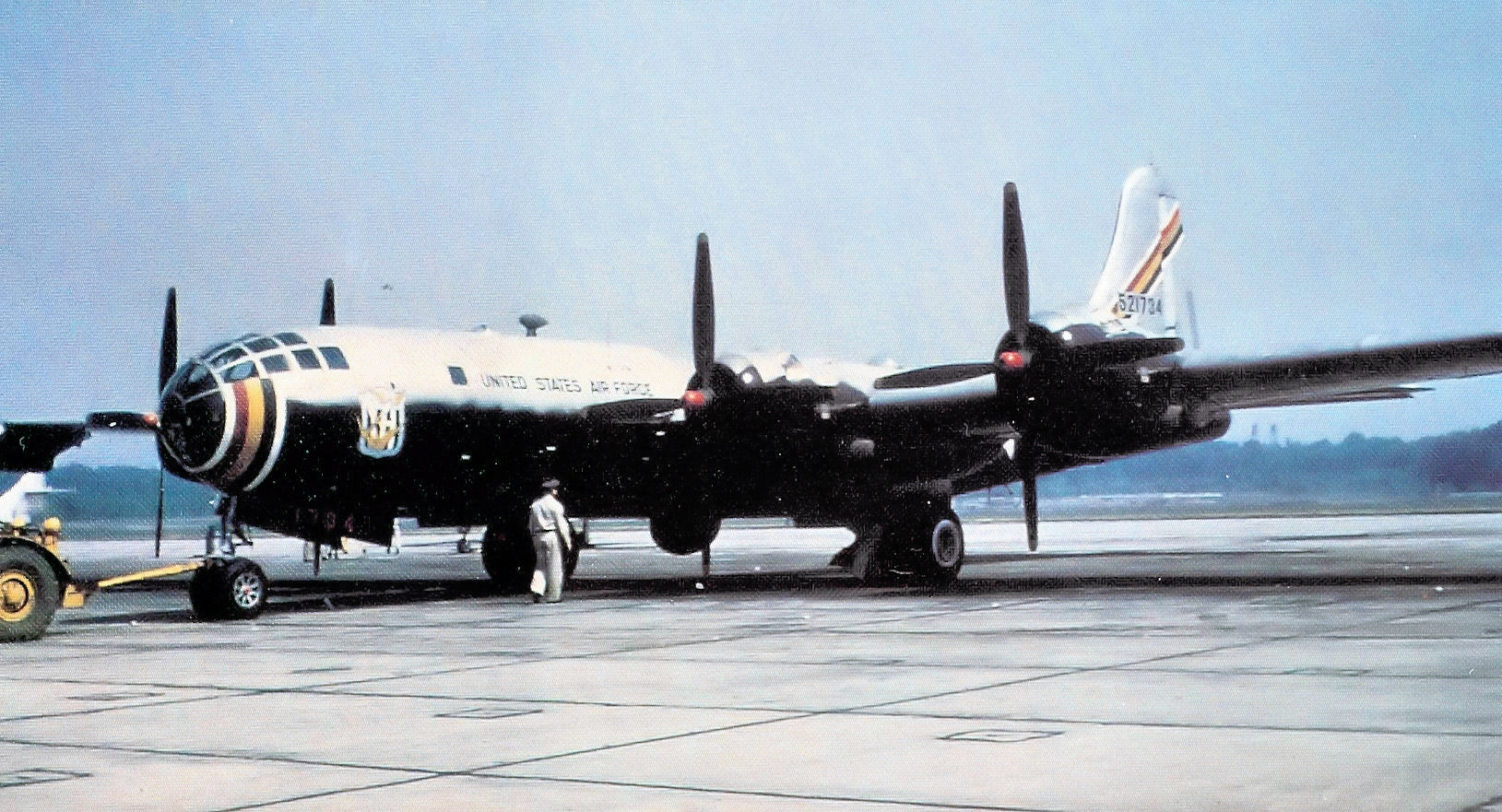
Experimental Boeing YKB-29T Superfortress (Boeing B-29-90-BW Superfortress) 45–21734, assigned to the 421st Air Refueling Squadron, Yokota Air Base, Japan, 1954 Returned to United States and retired to AMARC, Feb 1955.

The Boeing KB-29 was a modified Boeing B-29 Superfortress for air refueling needs by the USAF. Two primary versions were developed and produced: KB-29M and KB-29P.

The 509th and 43d Air Refueling Squadrons (Walker AFB, NM and Davis-Monthan AFB, AZ respectively) were created in 1948 to operate the KB-29M tankers. The 303d Bombardment Wing at Davis-Monthan AFB flew B-29s and KB-29s from 1951 to 1953 that provided training for strategic bombardment and air refueling operations to meet SAC's global commitments. Deployed at Sidi Slimane AB, French Morocco, 5 Oct – 6 November 1952.

== Variants ==
=== KB-29M ===
Section source: Baugher and National

The B-29 played an important role in developing the effective use of aerial refueling during the late 1940s. The first aircraft involved in this programme were the KB-29M tanker and B-29MR receiver. At first, a grappling system, known as the looped hose method, was used; the tanker would enter formation flight behind, above and to the left of the receiver. It would then unreel a hauling cable attached to a 55-pound (25 kg) weight to make it dangle near vertically. The receiver would trail a hauling cable ending in a drag cone (to make this trail near horizontally) and a grapnel. With both cables trailed, the tanker would cross to the right of the receiver so the two cables snagged each other. With cables snagged, the tanker hauled both into its fuselage where the receiver's cable was connected to the tanker's hose. This was then hauled into the receiver. After connecting with internal fuel compartments pumping would begin. When the receiver was full the process was reversed allowing the tanker to recover its hose and the receiver its hauling cable. While this system was clumsy, it was often used in the late 1940s before a better system was developed. It was most notably used to refuel the Lucky Lady II during her famous circumnavigation of the globe in 1949. This helped sway the argument as to whether the USAF or US Navy should provide the US's nuclear delivery capability. The USAF won with the consequential massive expansion of the USAF's Strategic Air Command and cancellation of the US Navy's super carriers.

The looped hose method was only of use with large multi-crew planes since crew members were required to assist in the hauling in. A modified method known as the probe and drogue system was developed to allow single seat aircraft to be refuelled in the air. With jet fighters suffering from short range there was a need for these to be refuelled in the air and several KB-29Ms were modified to use 'probe-and-drogue' systems, in which the refueling hose has a torus-shaped para-drogue attached to the end, and the receiving aircraft has a probe on its nose or wing, which the pilot manoeuvers into the drogue to link the hose.

One KB-29M, redesignated YKB-29T, was modified to have another two refueling hoses on its wingtip. It served as the prototype for the KB-50D.

The refuelling systems were developed and installed by Flight Refuelling Ltd, at Tarrant Rushton in the United Kingdom.

=== KB-29P ===
Section source: Baugher and National

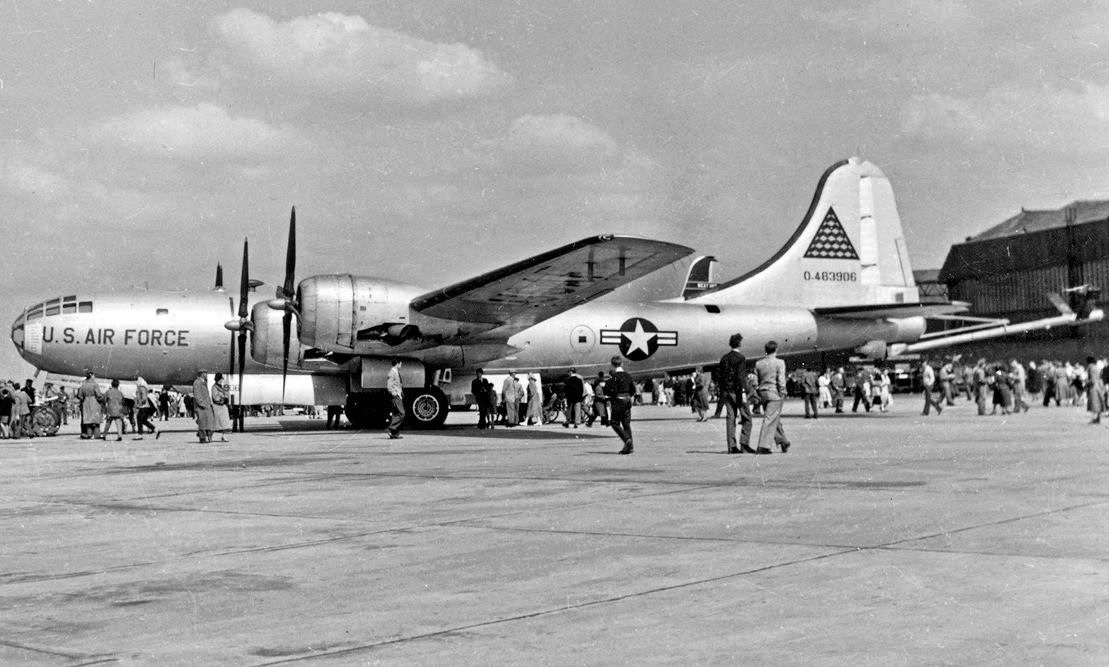
KB-29P tanker of 420th Air Refueling Squadron based at RAF Sculthorpe Norfolk in 1956

In an effort to improve on the probe-and-drogue system, Boeing developed a rigid flying boom system, which was first used on the KB-29P. The boom was mounted on the aftmost end of the KB-29P, and used a V-tail-like set of control surfaces for stabilization at its far end. With the V-tail-style surfaces, still used on most USAF tanker aircraft in the 21st century, the boom could be manoeuvered by the operator. The flying boom system was selected by SAC as the preferred method for refuelling their bombers and, because of the massive size attained by SAC, it became the most common method for in-flight refueling in the USAF and was used on KC-97s and also on modern tankers such as the KC-135 Stratotanker, the KC-10 Extender, and the KC-46 Pegasus. The KB-29P was operated by 420th Air Refueling Squadron based at RAF Sculthorpe Norfolk during the mid-1950s. From 1954 to 1957, the 407th Air Refueling Squadron was based at Great Falls Air Force Base. Later the base name was changed to Malmstrom Air Force Base.

== Specifications (KB-29P) ==
Data from United States Military Aircraft since 1909

General characteristics

- Length: 120 ft 1 in (36.60 m)
- Wingspan: 141 ft 3 in (43.05 m)
- Height: 29 ft 7 in (9.02 m)
- Wing area: 1,736 sq ft (161.3 m^{2})
- Empty weight: 69,011 lb (31,303 kg)
- Gross weight: 138,500 lb (62,823 kg)
- Powerplant: 4 × Wright R-3350 radial engines, 2,200 hp (1,600 kW) each

Performance

- Maximum speed: 400 mph (640 km/h, 350 kn) at 30,000 ft (9,150 m)
- Cruise speed: 315 mph (507 km/h, 274 kn)
- Range: 2,300 mi (3,700 km, 2,000 nmi)
- Service ceiling: 38,000 ft (12,000 m)
- Rate of climb: 500 ft/min (2.5 m/s)

Armament

- None

== See also ==
- Boeing B-29 Superfortress Survivors
- B-29 Superfortress variants
- Tupolev Tu-4 – Soviet copy was also used as tanker

Related development

- Boeing KB-50

Aircraft of comparable role, configuration, and era

- KC-97 Stratofreighter

Related lists

- List of tanker aircraft
- List of United States military aerial refueling aircraft
- List of military aircraft of the United States
- List of B-29 Superfortress operators
