= Kahuku Army Air Field =

Former wartime airfield in Hawaii

Kahuku Army Air Field
- Part of Seventh Air Force
- Oʻahu, Hawaii

Site information
- Type: Military airfield
- Controlled by: United States Army Air Forces

Location
- Coordinates: 21°42′15″N 157°58′02″W (Approximate)

Kahuku Army Air Field is a former wartime airfield in Hawaii. It was located in the northern part of the Island of Oʻahu.

== History ==
=== World War II ===
Possibly developed as an emergency field dating to the 1930s, but it was not until the United States entered World War II that the airfield was developed. Kahuku Army Air Field was classified as an auxiliary field and had a very short life span, from 1942 until it was closed in the late 1940s.

Ground troops were stationed in the area to protect the airfield and man the shoreline fortifications. The northern tip of Oʻahu had three airfields in close proximity during World War II. The Kahuku Point Airfield was located near the tip of Kahuku Point, and was evidently the most elaborate.

The Kahuku Army Airfields were used for training of pilots from Wheeler Army Air Field for instrument flying on different types of aircraft. The airfield was ideal for training because it had a good approach, runway length, and take off clearance. This field was not over populated like Hickam or Wheeler. It is documented that the 18th Air base Group, 47th Pursuit Squadron was stationed there along with B-24s and B-17s that were based at Kahuku for short periods of time during World War II. At the end of World War II, the 27th Bombardment Squadron used the airfield for training with B-24's until March 1946. Afterwards the USAAF closed the airfields and returned the Kahuku property to its owners.

=== Postwar history ===
No airfields at Kahuku were depicted on the October 1954 Hawaiian Islands Sectional Chart. In the early 1960s prior to the opening of the Campbell Race Course, the Kahuku airfield runways were used for both drag racing and the first Hawaii Grand Prix sports car race.

At some point between 1954 and 1977 the former Kahuku Point airfield was apparently reused as a private civil airfield. It was depicted as having a single 2,700-foot (820 m) hard-surface runway.

=== Current use ===
Very little remains of the three Kahuku airfields. The Turtle Bay Resort golf courses absorbed two of the runways. This site is typical of a former airfield converted into a golf course. The long runways are ideal for golf fairways.

The northwestern portion has been covered by aquaculture equipment built on the runway by a lease tenant. Very little evidence of Kahuku's World War II fortifications remain except one bunker site that is keeping its past military secrets. The entrance to the bunker is buried in sand and brush leaving only two concrete structures exposed. Scattered concrete pillboxes covered by low brush and debris can be found in the surrounding jungle. No historical markers indicating the areas past could be found. As of 2005, a small privately owned heliport for daytime VFR use only was located at the Turtle Bay Resort next to the main hotel building.

The present day Waikane Store, located 17 miles southeast of Kuhuku Army Air Field, is built out of a mess hall that was previously a part of the Army installation. This mess hall was sold as surplus in 1949, disassembled and moved to its current location by private owners.

== See also ==
- Hawaii World War II Army Airfields
