= Dillingham Airfield =

Airport near Mokulēʻia, Hawaii, US

- IATA: HDH; ICAO: PHDH; FAA LID: HDH

Summary
- Airport type: Military/Public
- Owner: U.S. Army
- Operator: Hawaii Department of Transportation
- Location: Mokuleia, Hawaii
- Elevation AMSL: 14.2 ft (4.3 m)
- Coordinates: 21°34′46″N 158°11′50″W
- Website: hawaii.gov/hdh

Map
- Location of airport in Hawaii

Runways
Direction	Length		Surface
Direction	ft	m	Surface
8/26	9,007	2,745	Asphalt

Statistics (2015)
- Aircraft operations: 103/day
- Based aircraft: 47
- Source: AirNav (http://www.airnav.com/airport/phdh)

Dillingham Airfield (IATA: HDH, ICAO: PHDH, FAA LID: HDH) is a public and military use airport located two nautical miles (4 km) west of the central business district of Mokulēʻia, in Honolulu County on the North Shore of Oʻahu in the U.S. state of Hawaii. It is operated by the Hawaii Department of Transportation under a 50-year lease from the United States Army. The airport is primarily used for gliding and sky diving operations, and also houses Civil Air Patrol (CAP) glider aircraft. Military operations consist largely of night operations for night vision device training and orientation flights for the United States Air Force Auxiliary (CAP). This airport is included in the Federal Aviation Administration (FAA) National Plan of Integrated Airport Systems for 2017–2021, in which it is categorized as a basic general aviation facility.

== History ==
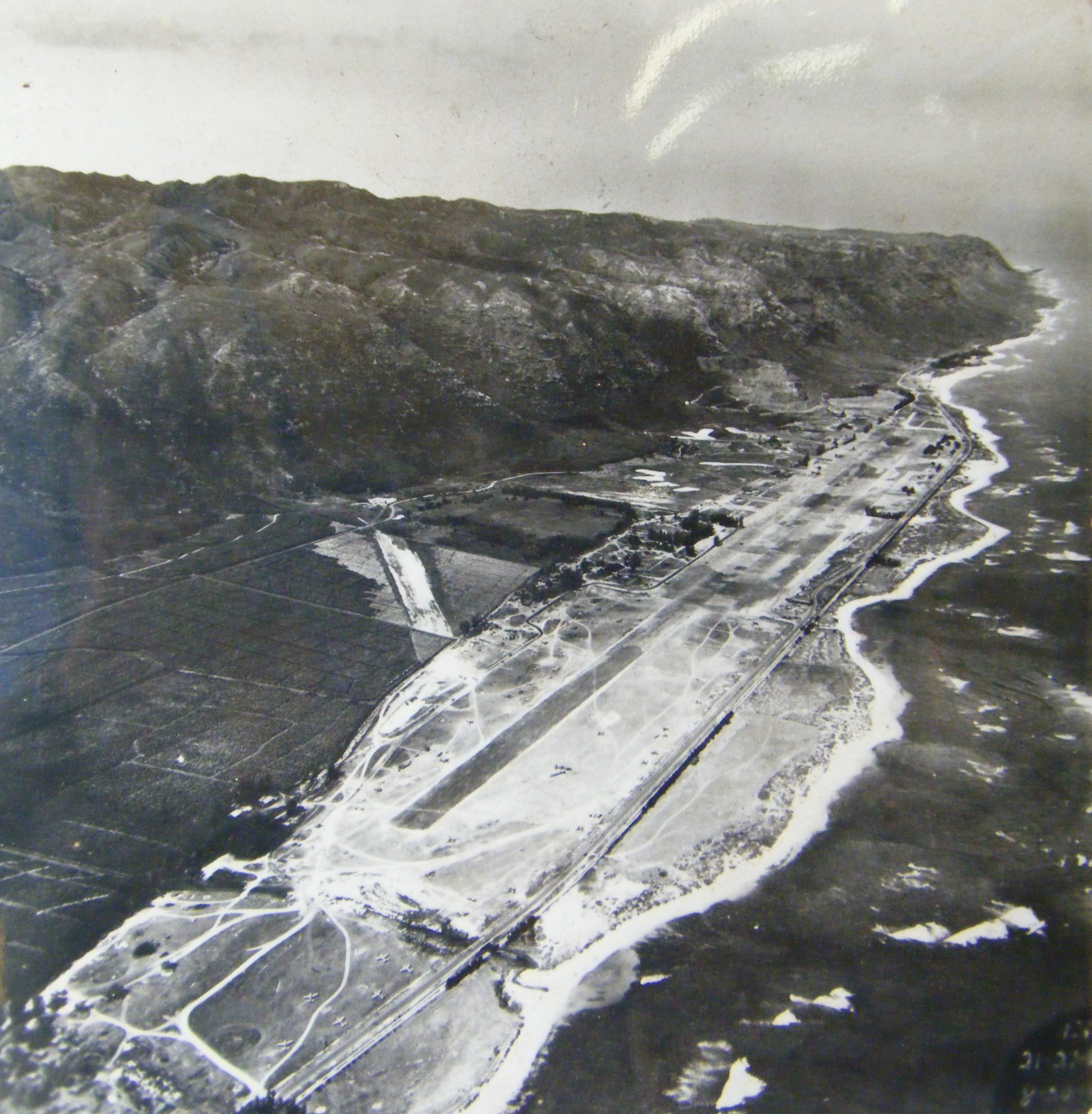
Dillingham Airfield soon after construction during World War II

A communications station called Camp Kawaihapai was established here in 1922 on 67 acres (27 ha) along the Oahu Railway and Land Company line. In the 1920s and 1930s, the railroad transported mobile coast artillery to the site. By 1941, the Army leased additional land and established Mokulēʻia Airstrip. Curtiss P-40 fighters were deployed at North Shore airstrips at Kahuku, Haleʻiwa and Mokulēʻia when the attack on Pearl Harbor took place. Aircraft taking off from nearby Haleʻiwa destroyed several attacking aircraft.

The runway was paved, extended to 9,000 feet (2,700 m) long, and a crosswind runway added from 1942 to 1945. By the end of World War II, Mokulēʻia Airfield could handle B-29 Superfortress bombers. In 1946, the Army acquired an additional 583 acres (236 ha). In 1948, the airfield was inactivated and renamed Dillingham Air Force Base in memory of Captain Henry Gaylord Dillingham, a B-29 airman who was killed in action over Kawasaki, Japan on July 25, 1945. Captain Dillingham was the son of Walter F. Dillingham and grandson of Benjamin Dillingham who founded the railroad which evolved into Hawaiian Dredging Company and the Dillingham Corporation.

Nike missiles were installed in the 1950s, but were obsolete by 1970.

In 1962, the State of Hawaii leased Dillingham for general aviation use. In the 1970s the base was transferred from the Air Force back to the Army. The state signed new leases with the Army in 1974, 1983, 2000 and 2024. In the 1980s, hangars, a control tower, and a fire station were built.

== Facilities and aircraft ==
Dillingham Airfield covers an area of 134 acres (54 ha) at an elevation of 14.2 feet (4.3 m) above mean sea level. It has one runway designated 8/26 with an asphalt surface measuring 9,007 by 75 feet (2,745 x 23 m).

As a general aviation joint-use facility, the airfield has one runway, a UNICOM tower, powered aircraft and glider hangars, and a tie down area for recreation aircraft. Jet-A and Avgas are available in a self-serve facility utilizing credit cards for payment. There were plans to extend the taxiway to the end of the 26 runway, but funding was delayed. Air traffic, unless approved prior by the US Army, is limited to daytime operations by general aviation and sport parachuting operations.

For the 12-month period ending June 30, 2015, the airport had 103 operators a day: 96% general aviation and 4% military. At that time there were 47 aircraft based at this airport: 24 single-engine, 20 glider, 1 helicopter, and 2 ultralight.

== Authority ==
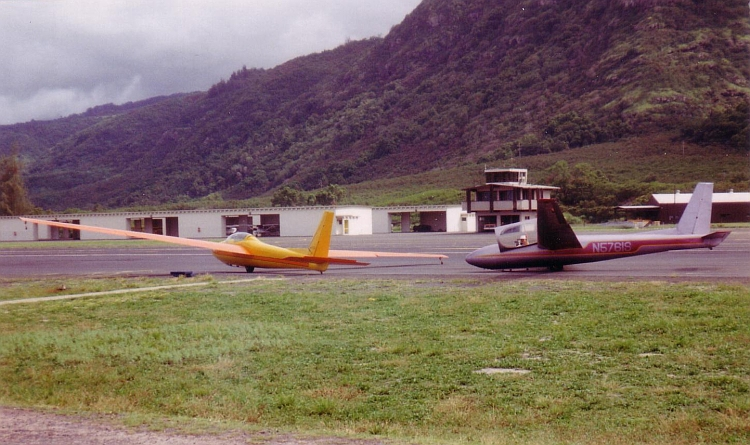
Two Schweizer SGS 2-32s used for tourist flights, Dillingham Airfield Oahu, 1993

Dillingham Airfield is part of a centralized state structure governing all of the airports and seaports of Hawaii. The official authority of Dillingham Airfield is the Governor of Hawaii. The governor appoints the Director of the Hawaii State Department of Transportation who has jurisdiction over the Hawaii Airports Administrator.

The Hawaii Airports Administrator oversees six governing bodies: Airports Operations Office, Airports Planning Office, Engineering Branch, Information Technology Office, Staff Services Office, Visitor Information Program Office. Collectively, the six bodies have authority over the four airport districts in Hawaii: Hawaii District, Kauaʻi District, Maui District and the principal Oʻahu District. Dillingham Airfield is a subordinate of the Oʻahu District officials.

== Filming location ==
The television series Lost filmed several scenes at Dillingham Airfield, due to its remote location close to the North Shore, where the series was primarily filmed. The fuselage from the fictional Oceanic Airlines flight 815 is also stored at Dillingham, and was transported to the beach when needed for filming.

== Accidents and incidents ==
- On June 21, 2019, a Beechcraft King Air operated by the Oahu Parachute Center crashed at Dillingham Airfield while taking off for a sunset skydiving flight, killing all 11 people on board.

== See also ==
- Hawaii World War II Army Airfields
- List of airports in Hawaii
