= 769th Bombardment Squadron =

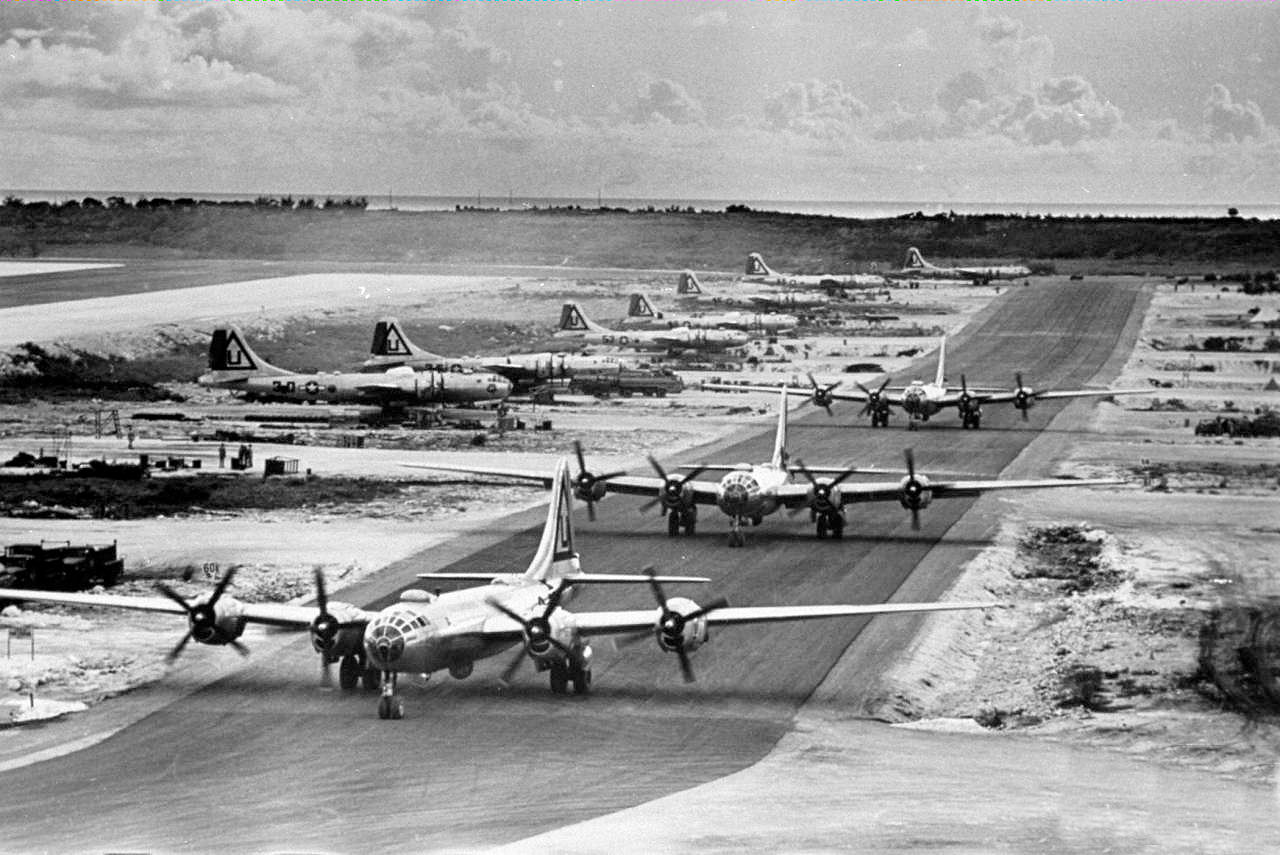
- B-29s of the 462d Bombardment Group on Tinian in 1945
- Active: 1943–1946
- Country: United States
- Branch: United States Air Force
- Role: Bombardment
- Engagements: China Burma India Theater; Pacific Theater of Operations
- Decorations: Distinguished Unit Citation

The 769th Bombardment Squadron is a former United States Army Air Forces unit. It was last assigned to the 462d Bombardment Group at MacDill Field, Florida, where it was inactivated on 31 March 1946. The squadron was first activated in 1943, and became one of the earliest Boeing B-29 Superfortress units. It moved to the China Burma India Theater in April 1944 and participated in the first attack on the Japanese Home Islands since the 1942 Doolittle Raid on 15 June 1944. It earned three Distinguished Unit Citations. The squadron moved to Tinian with the rest of the 58th Bombardment Wing in April 1945 and continued its participation in the strategic bombing campaign against Japan until V-J Day. In November 1945, it returned to the United States, where it was inactivated in April 1946.

== History ==
=== Training in the United States ===
The squadron was first activated on 1 July 1943 at Smoky Hill Army Air Field, Kansas as one of the four squadrons originally assigned to the 462d Bombardment Group. It was intended to be one of the first units to fly the Boeing B-29 Superfortress, but initially there were no B-29s available to equip the squadron. Instead, it moved to Walker Army Air Field, Kansas at the end of the month. Smoky Hill was one of four bases chosen for B-29 training based on their proximity to Boeing's factory at Wichita, Kansas, where most of the early Superfortresses would be produced. However, no B-29s were available to equip the squadron. It moved to Walker Army Air Field, Kansas at the end of the month.

At Walker, it received its initial cadre from elements of the 40th Bombardment Group and began to fly a mix of Martin B-26 Marauders and Boeing B-17 Flying Fortresses along with some service test (YB-29) models of the Superfortress. Delays in producing the B-29, labor disputes at the engine manufacturer, and modifications to the planes to make them ready for combat resulted in belated deliveries to combat units and it was close to the end of 1943 before aircrews could train in the new bomber in any number. Ground echelon personnel began shipping out in December 1943 to prepare the airfields for the bombers without completing their training in the United States. The air echelon of the squadron trained with the B-29 at Walker until March 1944, when it departed for its first overseas base, Piardoba Airfield, Bengal, India, to participate in Operation Matterhorn, which called for B-29 attacks from advanced bases in China, while the bombers' main bases were in India.

=== Operations from India and China ===
The air echelon ferried its planes to India via Canada, across north Africa then to India. Once all elements of the 462d Group had arrived at Piardoba in June, the squadron became part of Twentieth Air Force, which reported directly to Headquarters, Army Air Forces, bypassing theater command. Initially, the squadron's bombers were used to airlift supplies over the Hump to forward bases in China, primarily to Chengtu. It flew its first combat mission, an attack on rail targets in Bangkok, Thailand on 5 June 1944.

Ten days later, the squadron took part in the first attack on the Japanese Home Islands since the 1942 Doolittle Raid. Attacks on Japan required staging through forward bases in China, and it took twelve flights by the bombers to transport enough fuel and munitions to the forward bases to prepare for one attack sortie. (Note: The twelve to one statistic appears in various forms. This is how the statement appears in the unit history. Cate, however, states that the bombers consumed twelve gallons of fuel to transport one gallon that could be used for combat missions. Cate, p. 90.) This limited attacks on Japan to one in ten days. However, the squadron attacked iron plants, aircraft factories, naval installations, transportation centers and other targets in Japan. The squadron moved its available aircraft to the forward base at Chiung-Lai Airfield. Staging of B-29s, already armed and loaded with bombs began on 13 June and was only completed on the day of the raid, with only refueling needed at Chiung-Lai. The primary target for this mission was the Imperial Steel Works at Yawata.

The squadron also attacked targets in Burma, China, Formosa and Indonesia. In August 1944, operating from China Bay Airport in Ceylon (now Sri Lanka), where the Royal Air Force provided support for the mission, it mined the Musi River in Sumatra during Operation Boomerang, dropping down below a 1000-foot ceiling to sow the mines. On 20 August, the squadron again attacked iron and steel works in Yawata in a daylight raid for which it earned its first Distinguished Unit Citation (DUC). Fighter opposition on this attack included the first experience of a Japanese fighter plane intentionally ramming a B-29.

In October 1944, the 462d Bombardment Group was reorganized, along with other groups in XX Bomber Command. The squadron's strength was increased by three B-29s made available by the inactivation of the 771st Bombardment Squadron and maintenance personnel from the disbanding maintenance squadrons of the 462d. During its remaining time in the China-Burma-India Theater, the squadron found itself more frequently attacking tactical targets in Formosa and the Philippines to support of forces advancing in the Pacific.

=== Operations from the Marianas and return home ===
By the spring of 1945, Allied forces advancing in the Pacific had captured the Mariana Islands, and B-29 bases were being constructed there. In April, the squadron moved to the new West Field (Tinian), which was nearer to Japan and would permit direct strikes on the Home Islands without staging through advanced bases.

From Tinian, the squadron participated in the strategic bombing campaign against Japan, conducting mining operations and making night attacks against urban areas. Between 23 and 29 May 1945, it bombed industrial areas of Tokyo and Yokohama, for which it was awarded a second DUC. It earned a third DUC for an attack on an aircraft manufacturing plant at Takarazuka on 25 July.

The squadron flew its last mission of the war on 14 August 1945. Following V-J Day the squadron remained on Tinian until November 1945, when it moved to MacDill Field, Florida. It was only partially staffed while there, and it was inactivated at MacDill on 31 March 1946, shortly after the formation of Strategic Air Command.

== Lineage ==
- Constituted as the 769th Bombardment Squadron (Heavy) on 19 May 1943

Activated on 1 July 1943
Redesignated 769th Bombardment Squadron, Very Heavy on 20 November 1943
Inactivated on 31 March 1946

=== Assignments ===
- 462d Bombardment Group, 1 July 1943 – 31 March 1946

=== Stations ===
- Smoky Hill Army Air Field, Kansas, 1 July 1943
- Walker Army Air Field, Kansas, 28 July–c. 12 March 1944
- Piardoba Airfield, India, c. 19 April 1944 – April 1945
- West Field, Tinian, Mariana Islands April–5 November 1945
- MacDill Field, Florida, November 1945-31 March 1946

=== Aircraft ===
- Martin B-26 Marauder, 1943
- Boeing B-17 Flying Fortress, 1943
- Boeing YB-29 Superfortress, 1943
- Boeing B-29 Superfortress, 1944–1946

=== Awards and campaigns ===
Award streamer	Award	Dates	Notes
	Distinguished Unit Citation	20 August 1944	Yawata, Japan
	Distinguished Unit Citation	23, 25 and 29 May 1945	Tokyo and Yokohama, Japan
	Distinguished Unit Citation	24 July 1945	Takarazuka, Japan

Campaign Streamer	Campaign	Dates	Notes
	India-Burma	c. 16 April 1944 – 28 January 1945	
	China Defensive	c. 16 April 1944 – 4 May 1945	
	Air Offensive, Japan	15 June 1944 – 2 September 1945	
	Central Burma	29 January 1945 – April 1945	
	Western Pacific	17 April 1945 – 2 September 1945	

== See also ==
- List of B-29 Superfortress operators
- B-17 Flying Fortress units of the United States Army Air Forces
- List of Martin B-26 Marauder operators
