= Piardoba Airfield =

Abandoned airfield in India

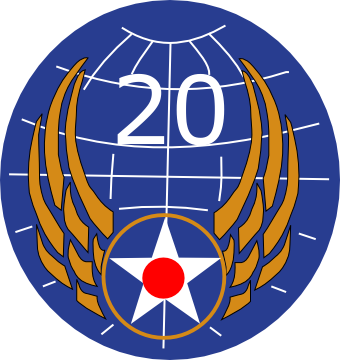
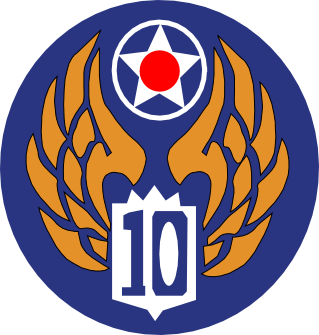
Piardoba Airfield
- Part of Twentieth Air Force; Tenth Air Force
- BANKURA DIST., WEST BENGAL, India
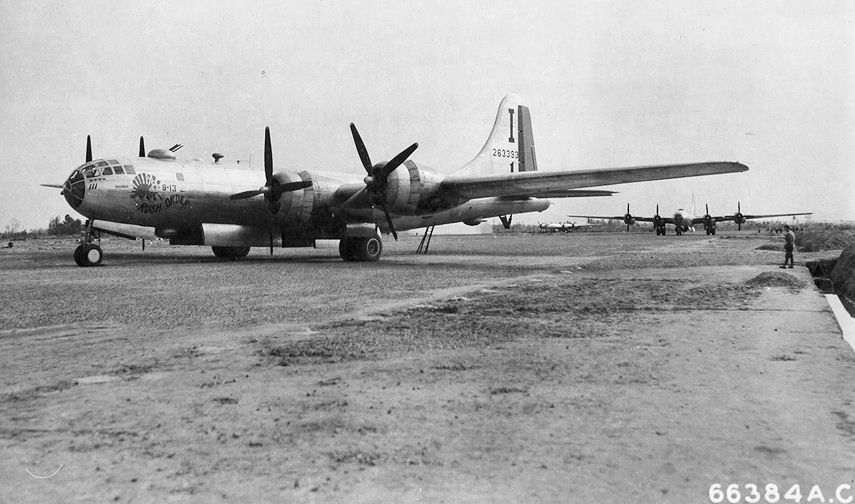
- Bell-Atlanta B-29-10-BA Superfortress at Piardoba Airfield

Site information
- Type: Military airfield
- Condition: Abandoned

Location
- Location within West Bengal Location within India
- Coordinates: 22°59′21.86″N 087°17′59.00″E

Site history
- Built: 1942
- In use: 1942–1945
- Battles/wars: World War II

Piardoba Airfield is an abandoned airfield in India, located 6.6 miles (10.7 km) S of Bishnupur, West Bengal, Bankura District, in the state of West Bengal, India.

== History ==
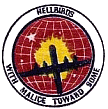
Emblem of the 462d Bombardment Group

During World War II, the airfield hosted the United States Army Air Force 462d Bombardment Group prior to its deployment to the Mariana Islands.

Piardoba was originally designed for Consolidated B-24 Liberator use. In 1943 it was designated as a Boeing B-29 Superfortress base for the planned deployment of the United States Army Air Forces XX Bomber Command to India. Advance Army Air Forces echelons arrived in India in December 1943 to organize the upgrading of the airfield and thousands of Indians labored to upgrade the facility for Superfortress operations. It was one of four B-29 bases established by the Americans in India.

Piardoba was designated to be the home of the 462d Bombardment Group, with initially four B-29 Squadrons 768th, 769th, 770th and 771st. Support elements of the group included the 9th, 10th, 11th and 12th Bomb Maintenance Squadrons; the 13th Photo Lab, and the 86th Air Service Group.

The 462d arrived at the base on 7 April 1944 after completing B-29 transition training at Walker AAF, Kansas. The deployment to India took almost three weeks, consisting of traveling to Morrison Field, Florida, then south through the Caribbean to Natal, Brazil. From Brazil the South Atlantic was crossed arriving in West Africa and re-assembling at Marrakesh, Morocco. The group then flew north and east from Morocco through Algeria and Egypt, before arriving at Karachi. By the time the group arrived at Piardoba, the month-long trip had taken its toll on the aircraft and personnel.

The 462dth was part of the Operation Matterhorn project of XX Bomber Command, the bombing of the Japanese Home Islands. In order to reach Japan, the B-29s of the group needed to stage operations from Kuinglai (Linqiong) Airfield (A-4), a forward base just to the southwest of Chendu in south-central China.

However, in order to stage missions and operate from Kuinglai, the group need to transport supplies of fuel, bombs, and spares needed 1,200 miles to the airfield. Six round trips were necessary to deliver enough fuel for one airplane to mount a combat mission from China - an impractical logistics concept for an aerial campaign.

Almost immediately upon arrival in India, engine fires caused the grounding of all of the groups B-29s. The cause was that the B-29's R-3350 engine had not been designed to operate at ground temperatures higher than 115 degrees F, which were typically exceeded in India. Modifications had also to be made to the aircraft and after these modifications, B-29 flights to India were resumed.

The first combat mission by the group took place on 5 June 1944, when squadrons of the 462d took off from India to attack the Makasan railroad yards at Bangkok, Thailand. This involved a 2261-mile round trip, the longest bombing mission yet attempted during the war.

On 15 June the group participated in the first American Air Force attack on the Japanese Home Islands since the Doolittle Raid in 1942, a raid on Yawata. Operating from bases in India, and at times staging through fields in India and China, the group struck transportation centers, naval installations, iron works, aircraft plants, and other targets in Japan, Thailand, Burma, China, Formosa, and Indonesia. From a staging base in Ceylon, the 462d mined the Moesi River on Sumatra in August 1944 during Operation Boomerang. Received a Distinguished Unit Citation for a daylight attack on iron and steel works at Yawata, Japan, in August 1944.

The 462d evacuated staging fields in China in January 1945 due to the Japanese offensive in South China which threatened the forward staging bases, but continued operations from India, bombing targets in Thailand and mining waters around Singapore. However, by late 1944 it was becoming apparent that B-29 operations against Japan staged out of the bases in Chengtu were far too expensive in men and materials and would have to be stopped. In December 1944, the Joint Chiefs of Staff made the decision that Operation Matterhorn would be phased out, and the B-29s would be moved to newly captured bases in the Marianas in the central Pacific.

On 26 February 1945, the 462d Bombardment Group flew south to Ceylon, then southeast across the Indian Ocean to Perth in Western Australia. Flying north through New Guinea, it reached its new home at West Field, Tinian, in the Mariana Islands on 4 April where it and its parent 58th Bombardment Wing came under the command of the new XXI Bomber Command.

With the departure of the B-29s to the Marianas, Piardoba Airfield was turned over to the Tenth Air Force. The 33d Fighter Group moved to the airfield on 5 May 1945 after being withdrawn from Combat. The group left its P-38s and P-47s at the airfield for disposal, with the personnel returning to the United States. The unit was inactivated in mid-November.

Also, Piardoba saw the arrival of Headquarters, Tenth Air Force from Myitkyina, Burma on 15 May. The headquarters echelon remained at the base until moving to Wujiaba Airport near Kunming, China effective 1 August.

Piardoba Airfield officially closed on 26 September 1945, being turned over to the British colonial government. The postwar history of the airfield is unclear, however today the large, sprawling wartime airfield is abandoned and in disrepair, with abandoned hardstands and taxiways visible on aerial images. Little no wartime structures still exist, although it appears that some small villages have taken over the former billeting areas.

== Gallery ==
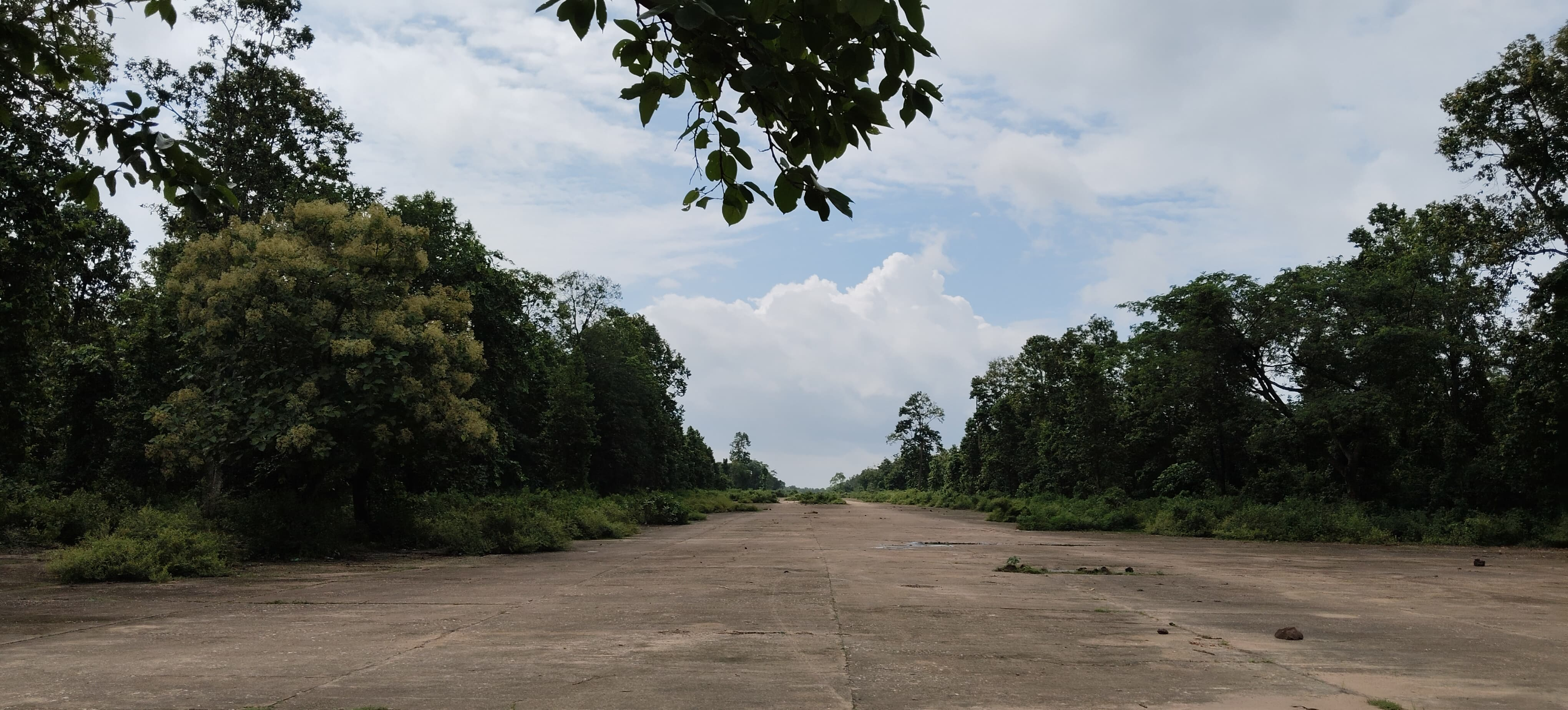
The view of the main runway of the Piardoba Airfield as on 26 July 2025. The air base is under the control of the Indian Ministry of Defence.

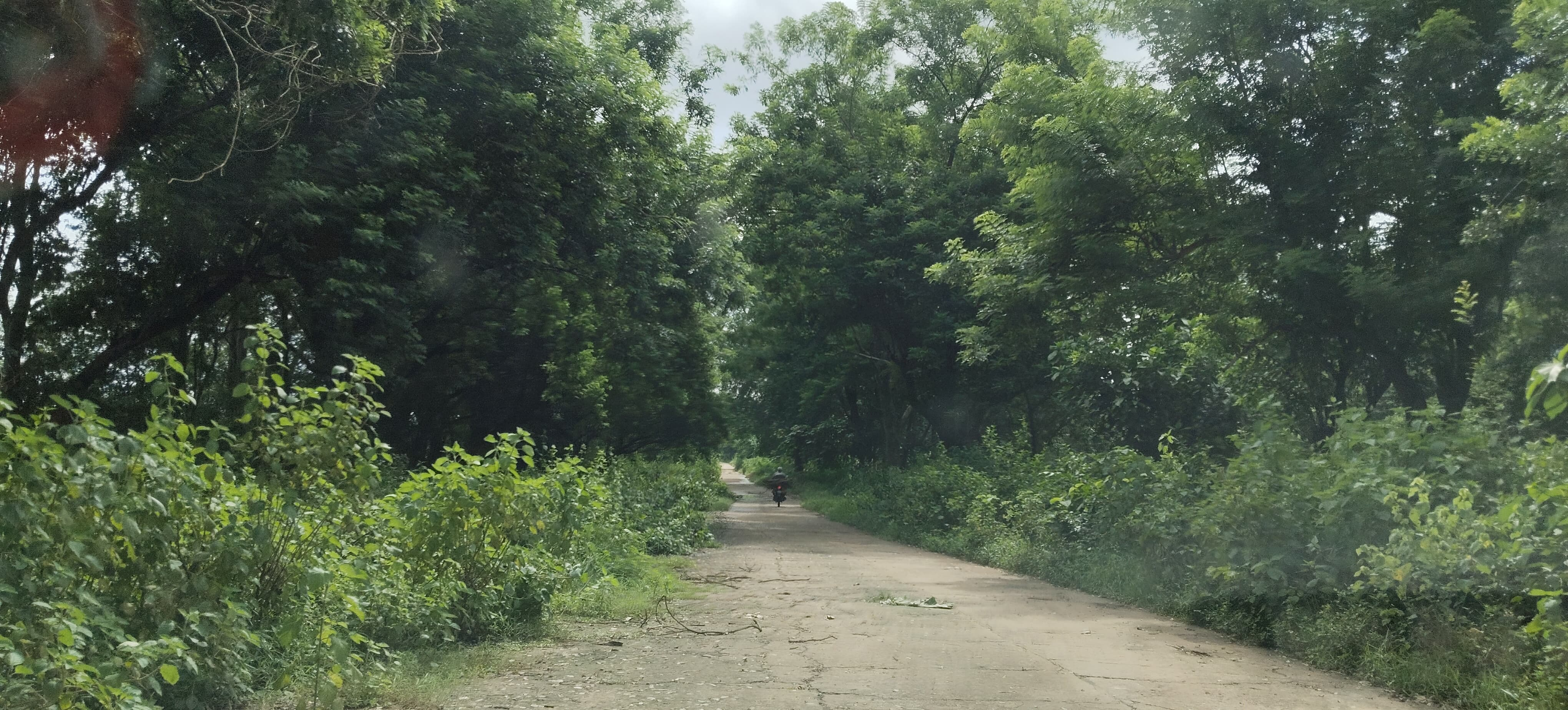
The original road that leads to the air base from State Highway 2.

== See also ==
- Operation Matterhorn
