= 327th Bombardment Squadron =

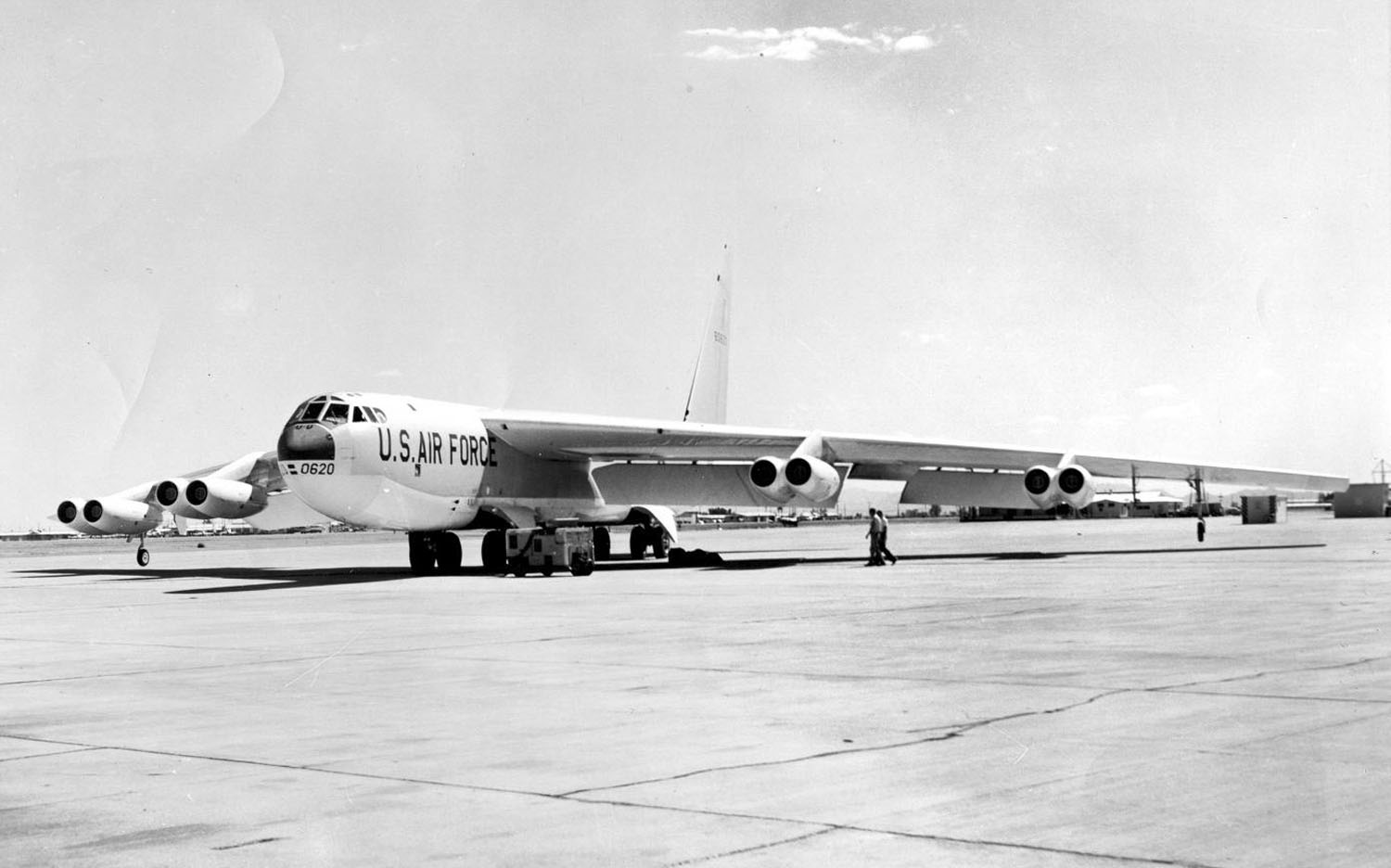
- B-52 Stratofortress, last plane flown by the squadron (Note: Aircraft is Boeing B-52D-80-BO Stratofortress, serial 56-0620. This plane was used for testing nuclear weapons in the Pacific as an NB-52D. It was scrapped on 25 October 1993. Baugher, Joe (15 February 2023). "1956 USAF Serial Numbers". Joe Baugher..)
- Active: 1942–1946; 1946–1963
- Country: United States
- Branch: United States Air Force
- Role: Strategic bomber
- Motto(s): Vigilamus Semperque Vigilabimus (Latin for 'We are Watchful, and We Shall Always be Watchful') (1962-1963)
- Engagements: European Theater of Operations; Korean War
- Decorations: Distinguished Unit Citation; Air Force Outstanding Unit Award; Korean Presidential Unit Citation

Insignia
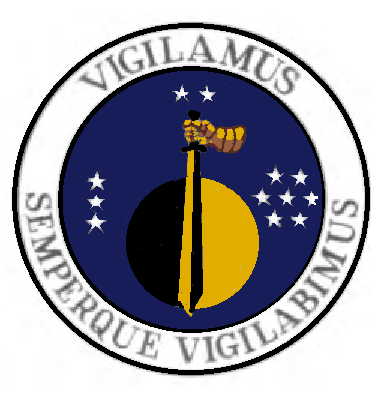
- 327th Bombardment Squadron emblem (Note: Approved 12 March 1962. Description: On an Air Force blue disc within a wide white border, fimbriated black, a disc per pale black and Air Force golden yellow, its center at nombril point, surmounted by a sword palewise, pointing downward, the blade per pale Air Force golden yellow and black, hilt and pommel black, grasped by a mailed hand fesswise in chief, Air Force golden yellow, outlines and shading golden brown; all between in dexter three stars, all white The motto inscribed on the border in black.)

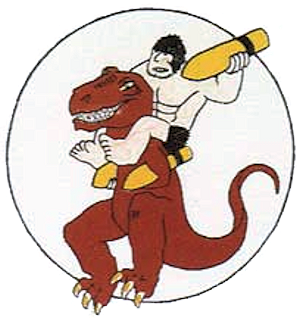
- Original 327th Bombardment Squadron emblem (Note: Approved 3 June 1943. The 4 World War II squadrons of the 92nd Bombardment Group all adopted emblems depicting Alley Oop wielding a bomb and riding a prehistoric animal. Cf. Maurer, Combat Squadrons, pp. 399, 402, 498.)
- World War II fuselage code: UX

The 327th Bombardment Squadron is an inactive United States Air Force unit. It was last assigned to the 4170th Strategic Wing at Larson Air Force Base, Washington, where it was inactivated on 1 February 1963.

The squadron was first activated in March 1942. After participating in the antisubmarine campaign while training, it moved to the United Kingdom in August 1942, where it became a training unit for heavy bombers. From May 1943, it participated in the strategic bombing campaign against Germany. It earned two Distinguished Unit Citations for its actions. After V-E Day, it moved to France, performing airlift missions until it was inactivated in February 1946.

The squadron was activated at Fort Worth Army Air Field, Texas the following August as a Strategic Air Command (SAC) long range bomber unit. It deployed to Japan in 1950, flying missions during the Korean War. It moved to Larson in une 1960, as part of a SAC program to disperse its strategic bomber forces to reduce vulnerability to a surprise attack. In February 1963 it was inactivated and its resources transferred to another squadron as part of a SAC program to replace its strategic wings with units with distinguished combat histories.

== History ==
=== World War II ===
==== Initial organization and training ====
The squadron was activated at Barksdale Field, Louisiana on 1 March 1942, as the 327th Bombardment Squadron, one of the four original squadrons of the 92nd Bombardment Group. Later that month it moved to MacDill Field, Florida and trained with Boeing B-17 Flying Fortresses. While training in Florida, the squadron also flew antisubmarine patrols off the Florida coast. The squadron's air echelon departed Sarasota Army Air Field for Westover Field, Massachusetts on 19 June 1942, flying on to Dow Field, Maine on 29 June. The squadron then ferried their B-17s across the North Atlantic via Newfoundland starting between 12 and 15 August. They flew directly from Newfoundland to Prestwick Airport, Scotland. The 92nd Group was the first to fly their bombers non-stop across the Atlantic. (Note: The 97th Bombardment Group had flown its planes across the Atlantic with stops in Greenland and Iceland. Freeman, pp. 6-7.) Meanwhile, the ground echelon left Bradenton on 18 July, arriving at Fort Dix, New Jersey in the New York Port of Embarkation two days later. It sailed aboard the USS West Point (AP-23) on 2 August and docked at Liverpool on 18 August, moving to Bovingdon the same day.

==== Operations in the European Theater ====
The buildup of Eighth Air Force in England required the establishment of a combat crew replacement and training center, but a lack of qualified personnel and aircraft hampered its development. As a result, the decision was made to use the 92nd Group and its squadrons as a temporary crew training unit, acting as the main component of what became the 11th Combat Crew Replacement Center Group. However, the 92d was the first group to arrive in England with improved B-17Fs, and with the training mission came an exchange of these newer models for the older B-17Es of the 97th Bombardment Group to use in training. On 6 September, to provide the squadron with combat experience, it flew its first combat mission against the Potez aircraft factory at Meaulte, France. Although remaining a replacement crew training unit until May 1943, the squadron initially flew occasional combat missions. In January 1943, he squadron moved to RAF Alconbury.

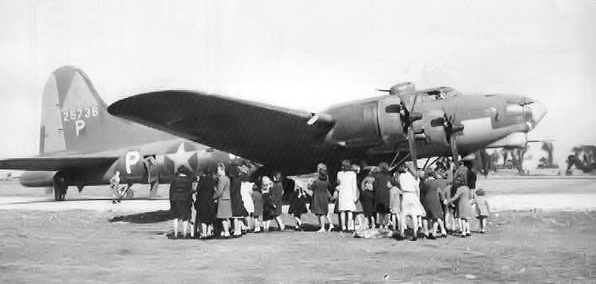
YB-40 gunship

In 1942 and 1943, there were no fighters capable of escorting bomber formations on deep strike missions. The Army Air Forces tested heavily armed bombers to act as escorts and protect the bomb-carrying aircraft from enemy fighters. As it ended its training duties, The 327th became the only squadron to be equipped with the experimental Boeing YB-40 Flying Fortress gunship from May through July 1943. Twelve of the YB-40s were dispatched to Alconbury for testing and evaluation. The first operational YB-40 sortie took place on 29 May 1943 against submarine pens at Saint-Nazaire, France. Very early on, it was found that the additional drag of the turrets and the extra weight of the guns, armor, and additional ammunition reduced the speed of the YB-40 to a point where it could not maintain formation with the standard B-17s on the way home from the target once they had released their bombs. The YB-40 could protect itself fairly well, but not the bombers it was supposed to defend. Consequently, the surviving YB-40s were converted back to standard B-17F configuration or used as gunnery trainers back in the United States. The squadron ended YB-40 operations after fewer than 10 missions on 29 July 1943.

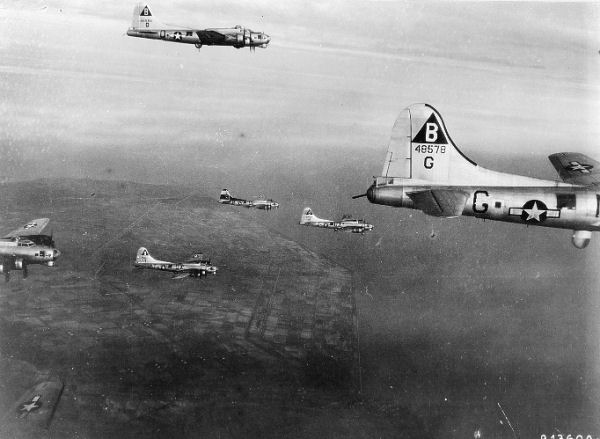
92nd Bombardment Group B-17s (Note: In the foreground is Lockheed Vega built Boeing B-17G-70-VE Flying Fortress, serial 44-8579. This plane survived the war and was sold for scrap in 1946. Baugher, Joe (11 February 2023). "1944 USAF Serial Numbers". Joe Baugher..)

In May 1943, the squadron's training mission was transferred and the 327th began flying combat missions. Through May 1944 its targets included shipyards at Kiel, ball bearing plants at Schweinfurt, submarine pens at Wilhelmshaven, a tire manufacturing plant at Hannover, airfields near Paris, an aircraft factory at Nantes and a magnesium mine in Norway.

The squadron earned a Distinguished Unit Citation (DUC) on 11 January 1944, when it successfully bombed aircraft manufacturing factories in Oschersleben Germany despite adverse weather, a lack of fighter protection and heavy flak. It participated in Big Week, the intensive attack against German aircraft industry in late February 1944. It took part in Operation Crossbow, attacks on launch sites for V-1 flying bombs and V-2 rockets. It struck airfields and industrial sites in France, Belgium, the Netherlands, and Germany. After October 1944 it concentrated on transportation and oil industry targets. On 11 September, it earned a second DUC for a mission against petroleum facilities at Merseburg.

In addition to its strategic bombing mission, the squadron flew interdiction and air support missions. During Operation Overlord, the Normandy invasion, it attacked coastal defenses, transportation junctions and marshalling yards near the beachhead. It provided air support for Operation Cobra, the Allied breakout at Saint Lo, It bombed bridges and gun positions to support Operation Market Garden, the airborne attacks in the Netherlands near Arnhem, to secure bridgeheads across the Rhine in September. During the Battle of the Bulge, from December 1944 to January 1945, it attacked bridges and marshalling yards near the target area. During Operation Varsity, the airborne assault across the Rhine, it provided cover by bombing airfields near the drop zone. It flew its last combat mission on 25 April 1945, when the 92nd Group led the entire Eighth Air Force formation in an attack on Plzeň.

Following V-E Day, the squadron moved to Istres Air Base, France, where it participated in the Green Project, transporting troops returning to the United States, flying them to Cazes Field in Morocco until September, returning French servicemen to France on return trips. During the winter it flew displaced Greek nationals from Munich to Athens. It was inactivated in France on 28 February 1946 and its remaining personnel were absorbed into elements of the 306th Bombardment Group at Lechfeld Air Base, Germany.

=== Strategic Air Command ===
==== B-29 Superfortress operations ====
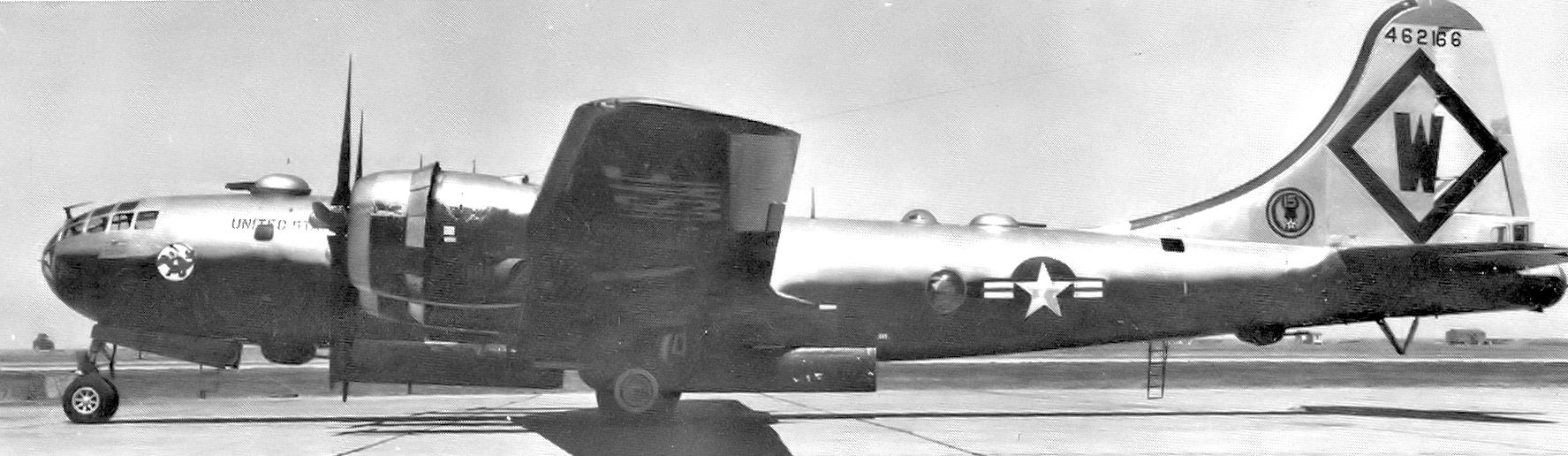
92nd Bombardment Group B-29 Superfortress (Note: Aircraft is Boeing B-29A-65-BN Superfortress, serial 44-62166 at Smoky Hill Army Air Field, Kansas. The plane crashed near Taegu, South Korea on 22 July 1952. Dirkx, Marco (21 June 2024). "1944 USAF Serial Numbers". Joe Baugher’s Serial Number List.)

The squadron was soon reactivated at Fort Worth Army Air Field, Texas as a Strategic Air Command (SAC) squadron in August 1946, when it absorbed the personnel and Boeing B-29 Superfortresses of the 714th Bombardment Squadron, which was simultaneously inactivated. In October, the squadron moved to Smoky Hill Army Air Field, Kansas, but its stay there was short, as it moved to Spokane Army Air Field in June 1947. It trained for strategic bombardment missions at all three locations. The squadron deployed to RAF Sculthorpe with other combat elements of the 92nd Group between April and February 1949. This deployment of B-29s, which were known to be capable of carrying nuclear weapons, was part of a show of force to support the Berlin Airlift. An element of bluffing was involved, for the squadron's B-29s had not been modified to be armed with nuclear weapons.

In July 1950, the squadron deployed to Yokota Air Base, Japan, where it came under the control of Far East Air Forces Bomber Command (Provisional). The squadron bombed factories, refineries, iron works, hydroelectric plants, airfields, bridges, tunnels, troop concentrations, barracks, marshalling yards, road junctions, rail lines, supply dumps, docks, vehicles and other strategic and interdiction targets. It returned to Fairchild Air Force Base in late October 1950.

==== B-36 Peacemaker operations ====
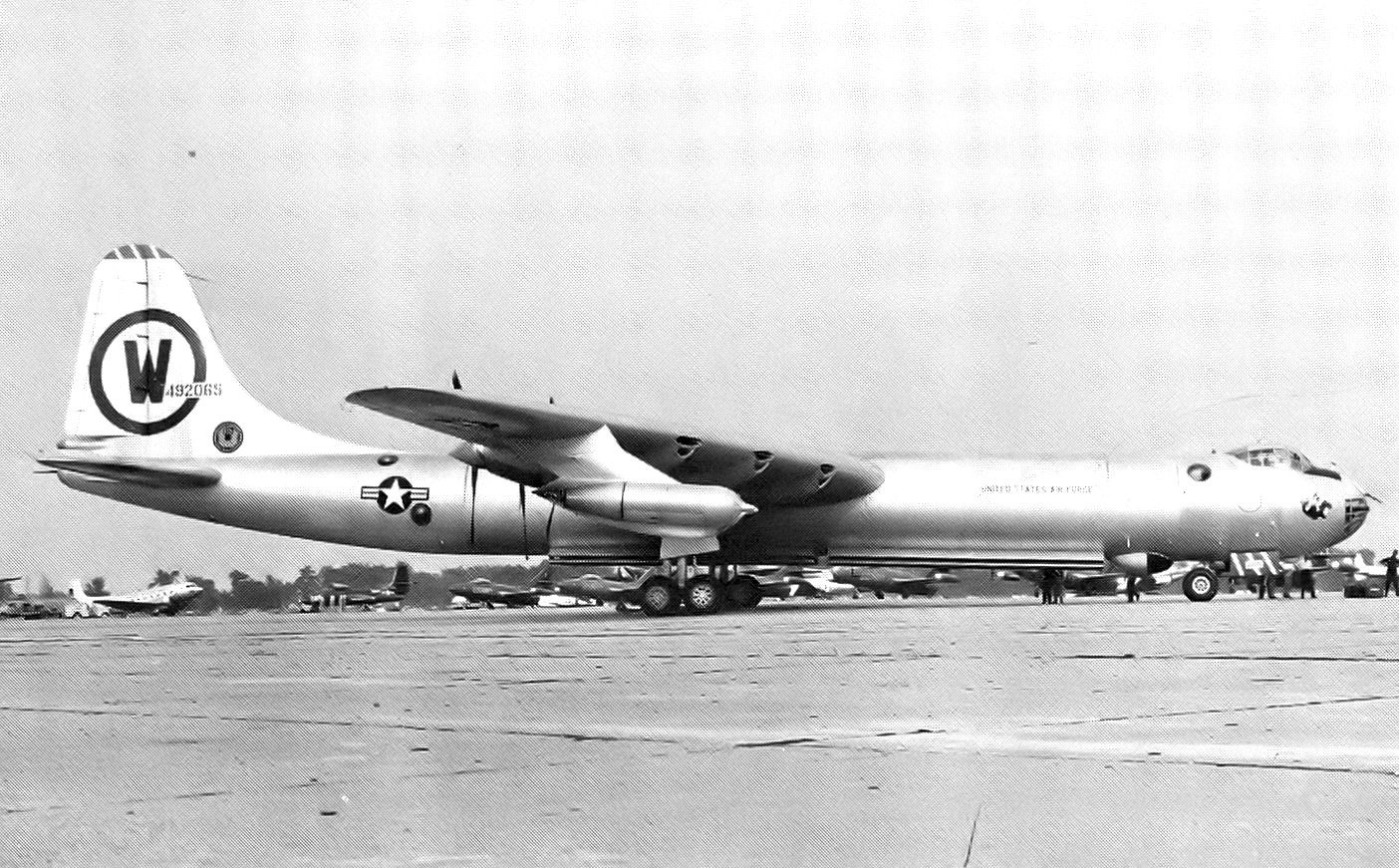
Squadron B-36 Peacemaker (Note: Aircraft is Consolidated B-36D-45-CF Peacemaker, serial 44-92065. Built as a B-36B-15-CF, later converted to B-36D by the addition of four jet engines. It was transferred to the Military Aircraft Storage and Disposition Center on 27 February 1957 and scrapped. Dirkx, Marco (18 August 2025). "1944 USAF Serial Numbers". Joe Baugher’s Serial Number List.)

In 1951, the squadron transitioned to the Convair B-36 Peacemaker intercontinental strategic bomber. The squadron participated in Operation Big Stick, a show of force in which the 92nd Wing deployed its B-36s to Japan. The squadron received the Air Force Outstanding Unit Award for its participation in this exercise. Along with other operational elements of the 92d Bombardment Wing, the squadron deployed to Andersen Air Force Base, Guam from 16 October 1954 to 12 January 1955 and again from 26 April to 5 July 1956. The squadron flew five sorties to support Operation Redwing, nuclear weapons tests in the Pacific, during this last deployment.

In the fall of 1956, the squadron assumed an alert status due to tensions in the Middle East. The requirement to maintain its B-36s ready for operations delayed the conversion of the squadron to Boeing B-52D Stratofortresses, which had been scheduled to begin in late 1956. It continued flying B-36s until 1957, when it began upgrading to the Stratofortress. (Note: This transition was nicknamed Operation Big Switch. A Legacy of Excellence, p. 14.)

==== B-52 Stratofortress operations ====
Delivery of new B-52s to the 92nd Wing was further paused in early 1957. As a result, the squadron became nonoperational from 5 February until deliveries resumed in June.

Large concentrations of bombers, like the 45 B-52s of the 92nd Wing at Fairchild, made attractive targets for an enemy strike. SAC decided to disperse its B-52 force to smaller wings with 15 bombers at other bases. This not only complicated Soviet targeting planning, but with more runways, it would take less time to launch the bomber force. In June 1960, the squadron moved to Larson Air Force Base, Washington, where it became the strike component of the 4170th Strategic Wing.

Starting in 1960, one third of the squadron's aircraft were maintained on fifteen minute alert, fully fueled and ready for combat to reduce vulnerability to a Soviet missile strike. This was increased to half the squadron's aircraft in 1962. SAC planners were looking into methods to protect their forces in addition to the ground alert program as early as 1957. Tests under the name Operation Head Start were precursors to Operation Chrome Dome. From 2 March to 30 June 1959, the 92nd Wing participated in Operation Head Start II, keeping five of its armed bombers in the air for the entire period. In January 1961, SAC disclosed it was maintaining an airborne force for "airborne alert training."

Soon after detection of Soviet missiles in Cuba, SAC brought all degraded and adjusted alert sorties up to full capability. On 20 October along with all B-52 units except those equipped with the B-52H, the squadron was directed to put two additional planes on alert. On 22 October, 1/8 of the squadron's B-52s were placed on airborne alert. Two days later, SAC went to DEFCON 2, placing all aircraft on alert. SAC returned to normal airborne alert posture on 21 November . On 27 November, SAC finally returned the squadron to its normal alert posture.

In February 1963, The 462d Strategic Aerospace Wing assumed the aircraft, personnel and equipment of the discontinued 4170th Wing. The 4170th was a Major Command controlled (MAJCON) wing, which could not carry a permanent history or lineage, and SAC wanted to replace it with a permanent unit. In this reorganization, the 326th was inactivated, and its mission, personnel and equipment were transferred to the 768th Bombardment Squadron, which was simultaneously activated.

== Lineage ==
- Constituted as the 327th Bombardment Squadron (Heavy) on 28 January 1942

Activated on 1 March 1942
Redesignated 327th Bombardment Squadron, Heavy on 29 September 1944
Inactivated on 28 February 1946

- Redesignated 327th Bombardment Squadron, Very Heavy on 15 July 1946

Activated on 4 August 1946
Redesignated 327th Bombardment Squadron, Medium on 28 May 1948
Redesignated 327th Bombardment Squadron, Heavy' on 16 June 1951
Discontinued and inactivated on 1 February 1963

=== Assignments ===
- 92nd Bombardment Group, 1 March 1942 – 28 February 1946
- 92nd Bombardment Group, 4 August 1946 (attached to 92d Bombardment Wing after 16 February 1951)
- 92nd Bombardment Wing, 16 June 1952
- 4170th Strategic Wing, 1 June 1960 – 1 February 1963

=== Stations ===
- Barksdale Field, Louisiana, 1 March 1942
- MacDill Field, Florida, 26 March 1942
- Sarasota Army Air Field, Florida, 18 May – 18 July 1942
- RAF Bovingdon (AAF-112), England, 18 August 1942
- RAF Alconbury (AAF-102), England, 6 January 1943
- RAF Podington (AAF-109), England, 15 September 1943
- Istres Air Base (AAF 196), (Y-17), France, 9 September 1945 – 28 February 1946
- Fort Worth Army Air Field, Texas, 4 August 1946
- Smoky Hill Army Air Field, Kansas, 25 October 1946
- Spokane Army Air Field (later Spokane Air Force Base; Fairchild Air Force Base), Washington, 20 June 1947 (deployed to Yokota Air Base, Japan, 9 July – 27 October 1950)
- Larson Air Force Base, Washington, 1 June 1960 – 1 February 1963

=== Aircraft ===
- Boeing B-17 Flying Fortress, 1942–1946
- Boeing B-29 Superfortress, 1946, 1947–1951
- Convair B-36 Peacemaker, 1951–1957
- Boeing B-52 Stratofortress, 1957–1963

== See also ==
- List of B-52 Units of the United States Air Force
- List of B-29 Superfortress operators
- B-17 Flying Fortress units of the United States Army Air Forces
