= Walker, Kansas =

Unincorporated community in Ellis County, Kansas

- Unincorporated community
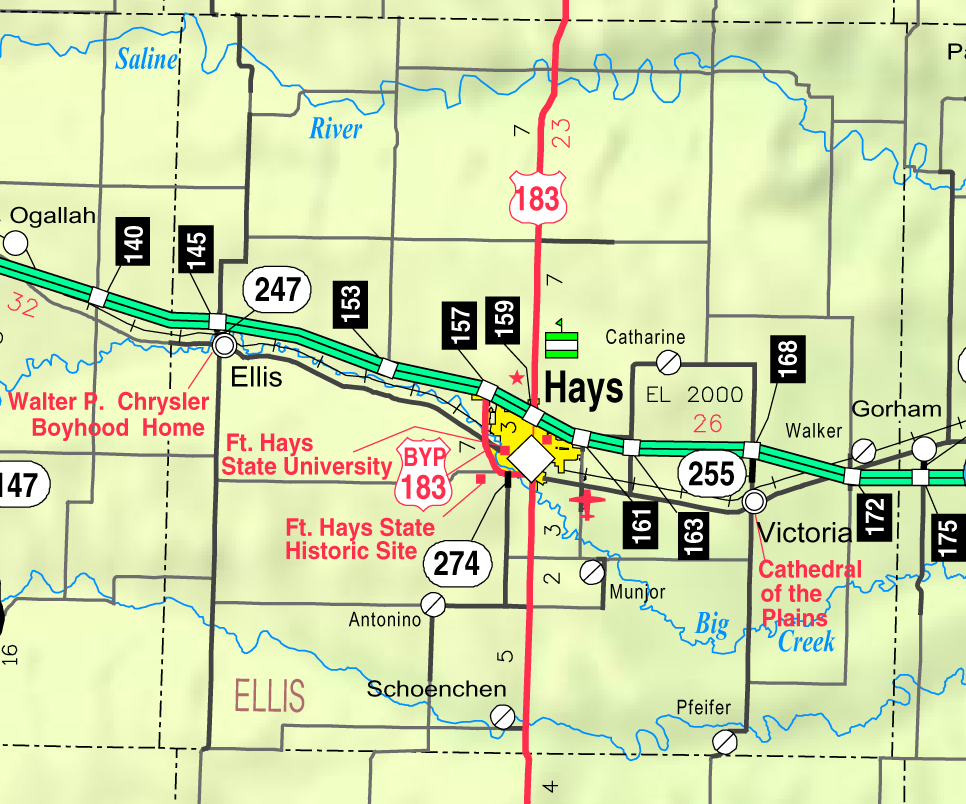
- KDOT map of Ellis County (legend)

- Location within Kansas Location within the United States
- Coordinates: 38°52′02″N 99°04′33″W
- Country: United States
- State: Kansas
- County: Ellis
- Founded: 1872
- Named for: Robert J. Walker
- Elevation: 1,942 ft (592 m)
- Time zone: UTC-6 (CST)
  - Summer (DST): UTC-5 (CDT)
- ZIP Code: 67674
- Area code: 785
- FIPS code: 20-74675
- GNIS ID: 475301

Walker is an unincorporated community in Herzog Township, Ellis County, Kansas, United States. It is located between Hays and Russell, along old Hwy 40 on the north side of I-70. Walker has a post office with ZIP Code 67674.

== History ==
Settlers from Ohio founded Walker in 1872. They likely named the settlement for Robert J. Walker, the 4th Territorial Governor of Kansas. From 1876 to 1878, they were joined by Volga German immigrants and Plattdeutsch-speaking Germans from Ohio and Kentucky who settled in the area.

The first post office in Walker opened in 1873, closed temporarily in 1876, and then reopened in 1878. St. Ann's Church was built and dedicated in 1905. The community's first school was built in 1893, followed by a second building in 1925. The school has since closed but remains in use as a community center.

In 1942, the U.S. Army built Walker Army Airfield northwest of Walker. During World War II, thousands were stationed at the airfield, mostly for training in operation of the Boeing B-29 Superfortress bomber aircraft. On August 31, 1944, a total of 5,936 personnel were stationed at the airfield. With victory over Japan in August 1945, the mission of the airfield was ramped down to a point where it was put on inactive status on Januar 31, 1946. The military closed and disposed of the base by the end of 1946.

Construction of Interstate 70 reached Walker in 1966, passing immediately south of the community.

== Geography ==
Walker is located approximately 1.5 miles (2.4 km) west of Walker Creek, part of the Smoky Hill River watershed, in the Smoky Hills region of the Great Plains. Walker is immediately north of Interstate 70, roughly 13 miles (21 km) east of Hays, the county seat.

== Transportation ==
Walker Avenue, a paved county road, runs north–south through Walker, intersecting Interstate 70 and U.S. Route 40, which run concurrently east-west, immediately south of town. The old alignment of U.S. 40, now a paved county road, runs northeast–southwest through Walker.

The Kansas Pacific (KP) line of the Union Pacific Railroad runs northeast–southwest through Walker, parallel to the old alignment of U.S. 40.

== See also ==
- Walker Army Airfield, an abandoned World War II airfield.
