= 771st Bombardment Squadron =

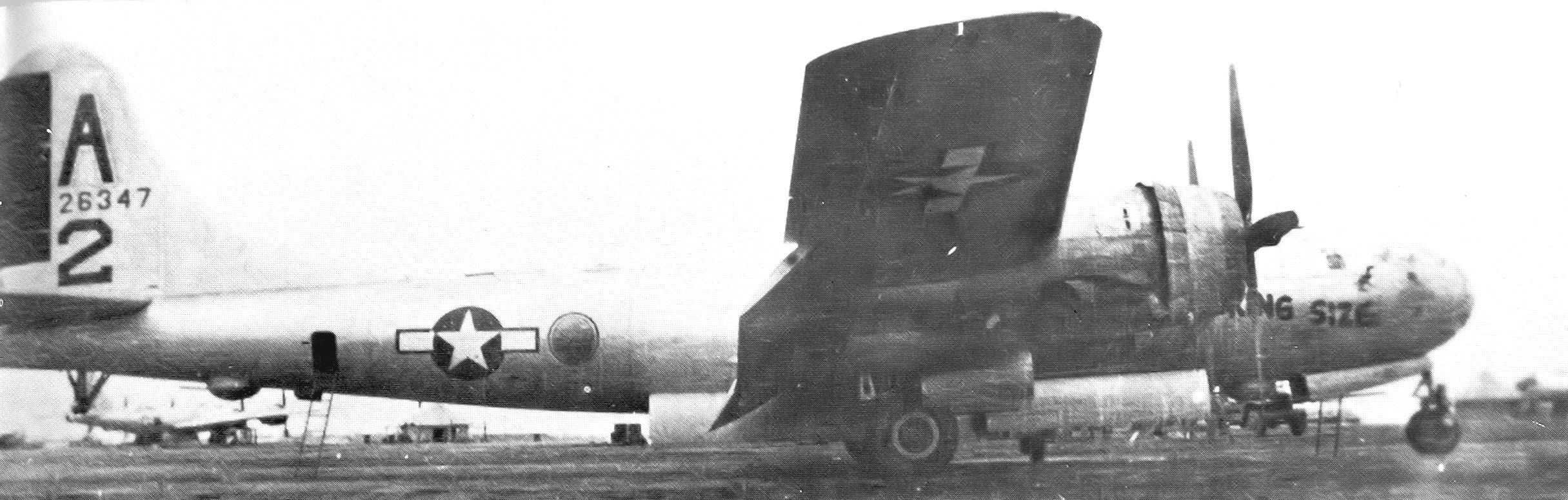
- 462d Bombardment Group B-29 Superfortress at Piardoba Airfield (Note: Aircraft is Boeing B-29-10-BW Superfortress, serial 42-6347, King Size. It was declared "war weary" on 20 January 1945 and returned to the US, where it was modified as a TB-29 trainer. It was salvaged on 21 December 1949. Baugher, Joe (2 June 2023). "1942 USAF Serial Numbers". Joe Baugher. Taken in June 1944. This was one of forty-seven B-29s that completed the first combat mission over Japan on 15 June 1944.)
- Active: 1943–1944
- Country: United States
- Branch: United States Air Force
- Role: Bombardment
- Engagements: China Burma India Theater
- Decorations: Distinguished Unit Citation

The 771st Bombardment Squadron is a former United States Army Air Forces unit. The squadron was activated in 1943, and became one of the earliest Boeing B-29 Superfortress units. It moved to the China Burma India Theater in April 1944 and participated in the first attack on the Japanese Home Islands since the 1942 Doolittle Raid in June 1944. In August 1944, it earned a Distinguished Unit Citation. It was inactivated on 12 October 1944, when the Army Air Forces reorganized its very heavy bomber groups to consist of three, rather than four squadrons.

== History ==
=== Training in the United States ===
The squadron was first activated on 1 July 1943 at Smoky Hill Army Air Field, Kansas as one of the four original squadrons of the 462d Bombardment Group, and was intended to be one of the first units to fly the Boeing B-29 Superfortress. Smoky Hill was one of four bases chosen for B-29 training based on their proximity to Boeing's factory at Wichita, Kansas, where most of the early Superfortresses would be produced. However, no B-29s were available to equip the squadron. It moved to Walker Army Air Field, Kansas at the end of the month.

At Walker, it received its initial cadre from elements of the 40th Bombardment Group and began to fly a mix of Martin B-26 Marauders and Boeing B-17 Flying Fortresses. Delays in producing the B-29, labor disputes at the engine manufacturer, and modifications to the planes to make them ready for combat resulted in belated deliveries to combat units and it was close to the end of 1943 before aircrews could train in the new bomber in any number. Ground echelon personnel began shipping out in December 1943 to prepare the airfields for the bombers without completing their training in the United States. The air echelon of the squadron trained with the B-29 at Walker until March 1944, when it departed for its first overseas base, Piardoba Airfield, Bengal, India, to participate in Operation Matterhorn, which called for B-29 attacks from advanced bases in China, while the bombers' main bases were in India.

=== Combat operations ===
The air echelon ferried its planes to India via Canada, across north Africa then to India. Once all elements of the 462d Group had arrived at Piardoba in June, the squadron became part of Twentieth Air Force, which reported directly to Headquarters, Army Air Forces, bypassing theater command. Initially, the squadron's bombers were used to airlift supplies over the Hump to forward bases in China, primarily to Chengtu. It flew its first combat mission, an attack on rail targets in Bangkok, Thailand on 5 June 1944 from its base in India.

Ten days later, the squadron took part in the first attack on the Japanese Home Islands since the 1942 Doolittle Raid. Attacks on Japan required staging through forward bases in China, and it took twelve flights by the bombers to transport enough fuel and munitions to the forward bases to prepare for one attack sortie. (Note: The twelve to one statistic appears in various forms. This is how the statement appears in the unit history. Cate, however, states that the bombers consumed twelve gallons of fuel to transport one gallon that could be used for combat missions. Cate, p. 90.) This limited attacks on Japan to one in ten days. However, the squadron attacked iron plants, aircraft factories, naval installations, transportation centers and other targets in Japan. The squadron moved its available aircraft to the forward base at Chiung-Lai Airfield. Staging of B-29s, already armed and loaded with bombs began on 13 June and was only completed on the day of the raid, with only refueling needed at Chiung-Lai. The primary target for this mission was the Imperial Steel Works at Yawata.

The squadron also attacked targets in Burma, China, Formosa and Indonesia. In August 1944, operating from China Bay Airport in Ceylon (now Sri Lanka), where the Royal Air Force provided support for the mission, it mined the Musi River in Sumatra, dropping down below a 1000 foot ceiling to sow the mines in Operation Boomerang. All petroleum products exported from the large refineries at Palembang were shipped via this stream. On 20 August, the squadron again attacked iron and steel works in Yawata, Japan in a daylight raid for which it earned the Distinguished Unit Citation (DUC). Fighter opposition on this attack included the first experience of a Japanese fighter plane intentionally ramming a B-29.

In October 1944, the 462d Bombardment Group was reorganized, along with other groups in XX Bomber Command. Although this reorganization increased the number of aircraft assigned to each squadron and to the group, it reduced the number of squadrons in the group from four to three. The squadron was inactivated in this reorganization and its crews and airplanes were distributed to the other three squadrons of the 462d Group.

== Lineage ==
- Constituted 771st Bombardment Squadron (Heavy) on 19 May 1943

Activated on 1 July 1943
Redesignated 771st Bombardment Squadron, Very Heavy in November 1943
Inactivated on 12 October 1944

=== Assignments ===
- 462d Bombardment Group, 1 July 1943 – 12 October 1944

=== Stations ===
- Smoky Hill Army Air Field, Kansas, 1 July 1943
- Walker Army Air Field, Kansas, 28 July 1943 – c. 12 March 1944
- Piardoba Airfield, India, c. 16 April–12 October 1944

=== Aircraft ===
- Martin B-26 Marauder, 1943
- Boeing B-17 Flying Fortress, 1943–1944
- Boeing B-29 Superfortress, 1944

=== Awards and campaigns ===
Award streamer	Award	Dates	Notes
	Distinguished Unit Citation	20 August 1944	Yawata, Japan

Campaign Streamer	Campaign	Dates	Notes
	India-Burma	c. 16 April 1944 – 12 October 1944	
	China Defensive	c. 16 April 1944 – 12 October 1944	
	Air Offensive, Japan	15 June 1944 – 12 October 1944	
	Western Pacific	17 April 1945––12 October 1944	

== See also ==
- List of B-29 Superfortress operators
- B-17 Flying Fortress units of the United States Army Air Forces
- List of Martin B-26 Marauder operators
