= 462d Air Expeditionary Group =

Provisional unit of the US Air Force

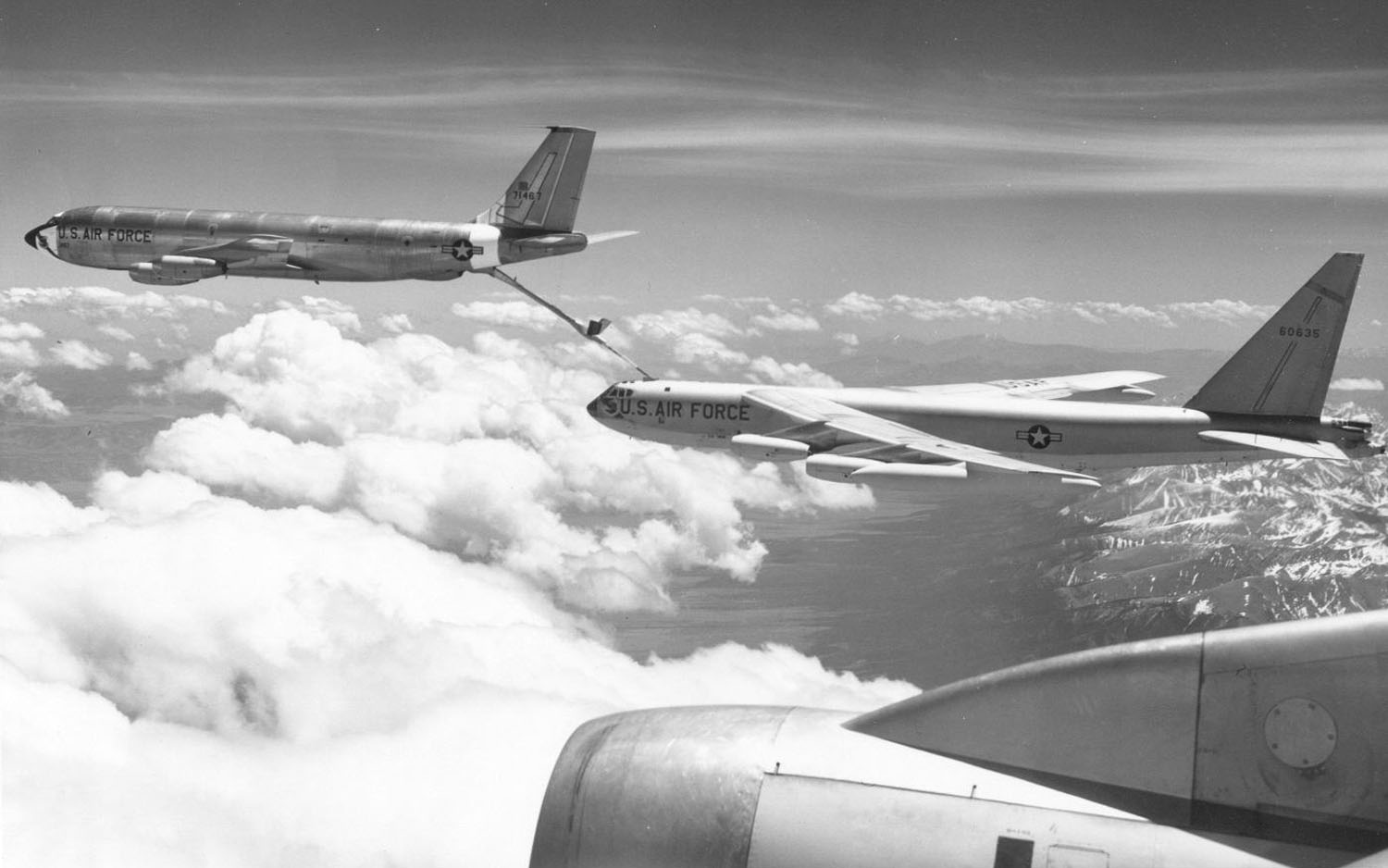
- SAC B-52 refueling from a KC-135A tanker (Note: Bomber Aircraft is Boeing B-52E-85-BO Stratofortress, serial 56-0635, Tanker aircraft is Boeing KC-135!-BN Stratotanker, serical 57-1467.)
- Active: 1943–1946, 1963–1966, 2002-unknown
- Country: United States
- Branch: United States Air Force
- Role: Mobility Support
- Part of: Air Mobility Command
- Nickname: Hellbirds (World War II)
- Motto: With Malice Toward Some (World War II)
- Engagements: Air raids on Japan (1943-45); War in Afghanistan (2001-2021)
- Decorations: Distinguished Unit Citation

Insignia
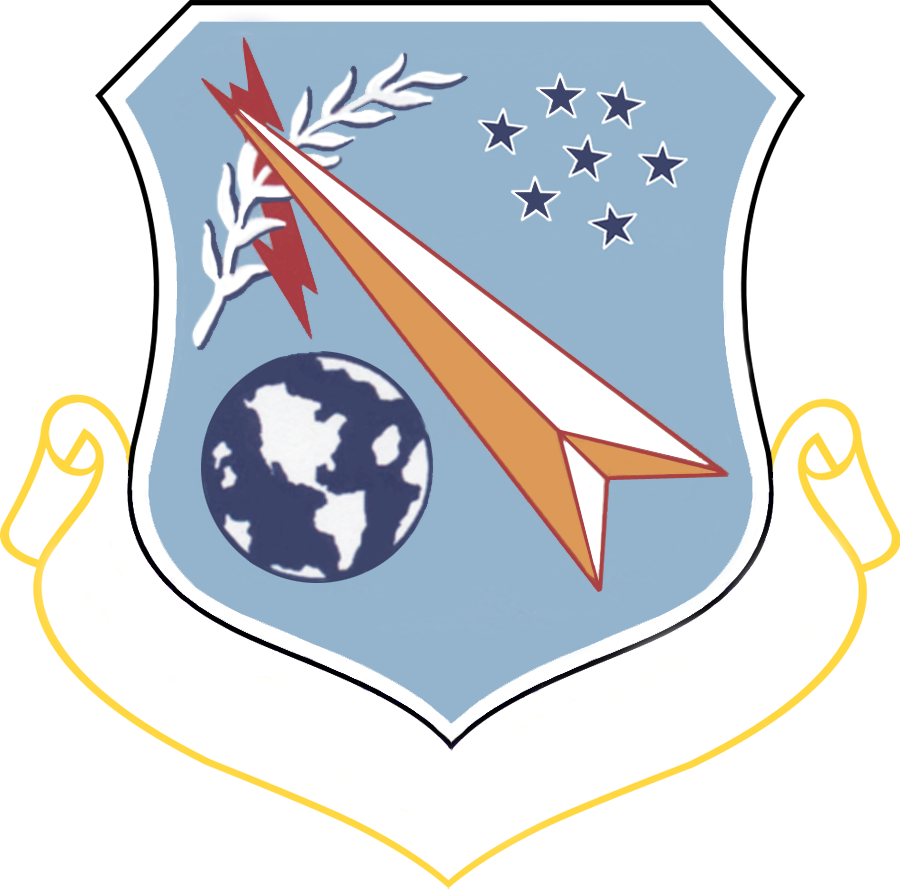
- 462d Strategic Aerospace Wing Emblem (Note: Approved 7 February 1963. This emblem was originally approved for the 4170th Strategic Wing.)

- Unofficial 462d Bombardment Group emblem

The 462d Air Expeditionary Group is a provisional unit of the United States Air Force. It is assigned to Air Mobility Command to activate or inactivate as needed to meet operational requirements. Its last assignment was at Naval Support Facility Diego Garcia, British Indian Ocean Territory.

The unit began during World War II when the United States Army Air Forces activated the 462d Bombardment Group as one of the first Boeing B-29 Superfortress units in 1943. It served in the Pacific Ocean Theater and China Burma India Theater of World War II as part of Twentieth Air Force. The group bombed Japan as part of the strategic bombing campaign. It earned three Distinguished Unit Citations. It returned to the United States in November 1945 and was inactivated in March 1946.

In 1962 the 462d Strategic Aerospace Wing was activated by Strategic Air Command (SAC) to perpetuate the lineage of inactive bombardment units with illustrious World War II records. It conducted strategic bombardment training operations flying Boeing B-52D Stratofortresses and maintained intercontinental ballistic missile readiness with LGM-25 Titan I missiles to meet SAC commitments. The wing served as a deterrent force and also supported SAC's global mission until inactivated in 1966 due to the closing of Larson Air Force Base.

The group and wing were consolidated into a single unit in 1984, remaining in inactive status. In 2002, the consolidated unit was converted to provisional status as the 462d Air Expeditionary Group and assigned to Air Mobility Command, which activated the group at Diego Garcia. Its inactivation date has not been determined.

== History ==
=== World War II ===
==== Training in the United States ====
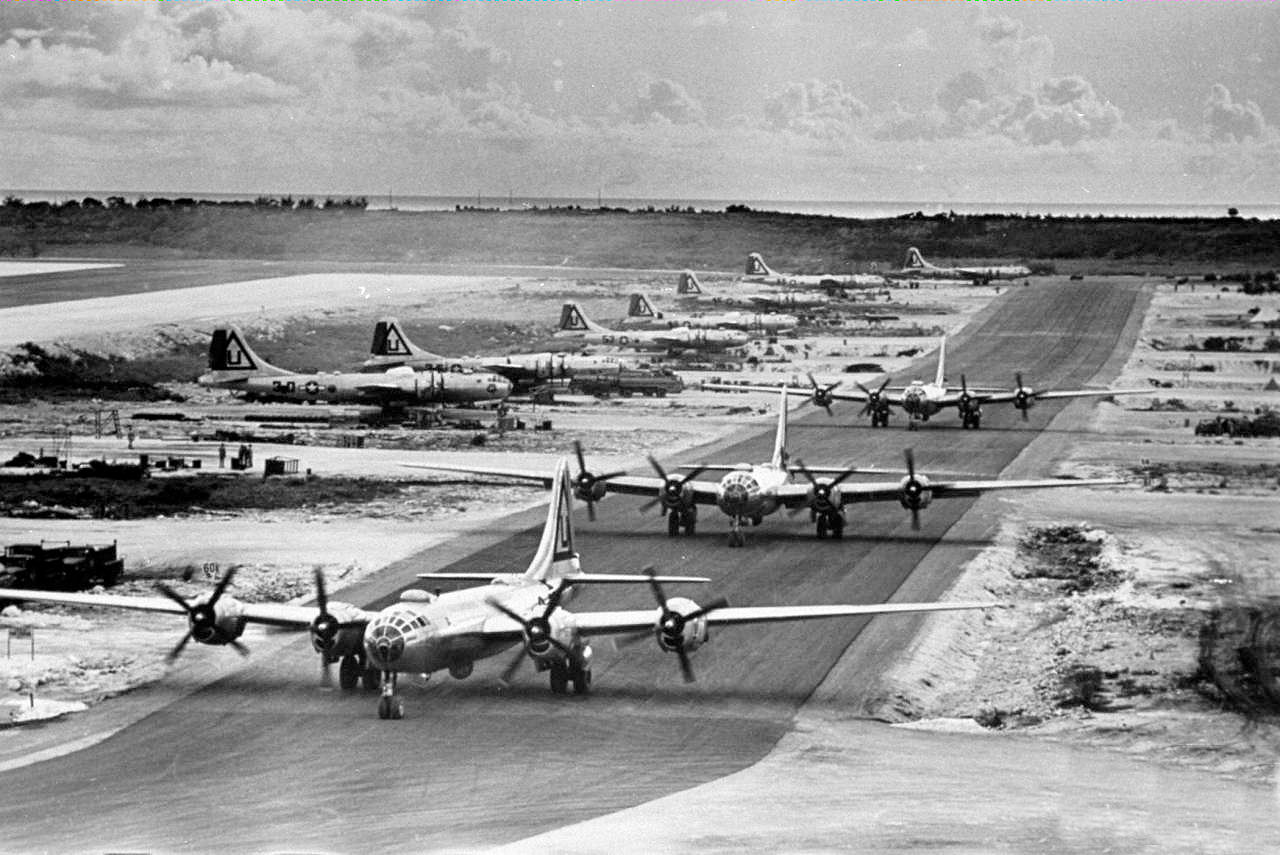
B-29s of the 462d at West Field Tinian 1945

The 462d Bombardment Group was constituted on 15 May 1943 as a Boeing B-29 Superfortress group and activated on 1 July at Smoky Hill Army Air Field near Salina, Kansas. It was originally assigned the 768th, 769th, 770th, and 771st Bombardment Squadrons. On 28 July it moved to Walker Army Air Field in Kansas where the group engaged in training on the new aircraft and its new mission. The 462d was assigned to the first Superfortress wing, the 58th Bombardment Wing.

==== Operations from India and China ====
In March 1944, the group left the United States and deployed via Africa to Piardoba Airfield, a former Consolidated B-24 Liberator airfield in India, arriving on 7 April. In India, the group was assigned to the XX Bomber Command of the new Twentieth Air Force. During the week of 15–22 April, no fewer than five 58th Bombardment Wing B-29s crashed near Karachi all from overheated engines. The entire wing had to be grounded en route until the cause was found. The cause was traced to the fact that the B-29's R-3350 engine had not been designed to operate at ground temperatures higher than 115 °F (46 °C), which were typically exceeded in India. Modifications had also to be made to the aircraft and after these modifications, B-29 flights to India were resumed.

From India, the 462d Bomb Group planned to fly missions against Japan from airfields in China. However, all the supplies of fuel, bombs, and spares needed to support the forward bases in China had to be flown in from India over The Hump (the name given by Allied pilots to the eastern end of the Himalayan Mountains), since Japanese control of the seas around the Chinese coast made seaborne supply of China impossible. Many of the supplies had to be delivered to China by the B-29s themselves. For this role, they were stripped of nearly all combat equipment and used as flying tankers and each carried seven tons of fuel. The Hump route was so dangerous and difficult that each time a B-29 flew from India to China it was counted as a combat mission.

The first combat mission by the group took place on 5 June 1944 when squadrons of the 462d took off from India to attack the Makasan railroad yards at Bangkok, Thailand. This involved a 2261-mile round trip, the longest bombing mission yet attempted during the war.

On 15 June the group participated in the first American Air Force attack on the Japanese Home Islands since the Doolittle Raid in 1942 when it took part in the bombing of Yawata. Operating from bases in India, and at times staging through fields in India and China, the group struck transportation centers, naval installations, iron works, aircraft plants, and other targets in Japan, Thailand, Burma, China, Formosa, and Indonesia. From a staging base in Ceylon, the 462d mined the Musi River in Sumatra in August 1944. The 462d received a Distinguished Unit Citation (DUC) for a nighttime attack on iron and steel works at Yawata, Japan, on 20 August 1944. In October 1944, the Twentieth Air Force reorganized its B-29 units. As a result, the 462d lost its 771st Bombardment Squadron and its four bombardment maintenance squadrons, absorbing their personnel into its remaining squadrons.

==== Operations from the Marianas and return home ====
The group moved to West Field (Tinian), in the Marianas between February and April 1945, for further operations against Japan with the XXI Bomber Command. Its first operation after the move was on 5 May 1945 against the Hiro Naval Aircraft Factory near Kure, Japan. It participated in the bombardment of strategic targets and incendiary raids on urban areas. It bombed industrial areas in Tokyo and Yokohama on 29 May 1945, being awarded a DUC for the action. The group received a third Distinguished Unit Citation for a daylight attack on an aircraft plant at Takarazuka on 24 July 1945.

The 462d returned to the United States, arriving at MacDill Field, Florida in November 1945. Demobilization, however, was in full swing and the group turned in its aircraft and was inactivated on 31 March 1946, never becoming an operational SAC unit. Many of the wing's personnel and aircraft were reassigned to the 307th Bombardment Group, which was activated at MacDill on 4 August 1946 as part of the re-established Fifteenth Air Force.

=== Strategic Air Command ===
==== 4170th Strategic Wing ====
The origins of the 462d Strategic Aerospace Wing date to 1 August 1958 when Strategic Air Command (SAC) established the 4170th Strategic Wing at Larson Air Force Base, Washington and assigned it to the 18th Air Division. as part of SAC's plan to disperse its Boeing B-52 Stratofortress strategic bombers over a larger number of bases, thus making it more difficult for the Soviet Union to knock out the entire fleet with a surprise first strike. The wing remained a headquarters only until 1 December 1959 when the 47th Aviation Depot Squadron and a combat defense squadron were activated to oversee and guard the wing's special weapons.

In January 1960, in anticipation of the 62d Troop Carrier Wing of Military Air Transport Service (MATS)'s impending move to McChord Air Force Base from Larson, MATS transferred Larson to SAC and the 4170th acquired a full set of support units, including the 829th Medical Group. In June, it added its first operational squadron, when the 327th Bombardment Squadron, consisting of 15 Boeing B-52 Stratofortresses moved to Larson from Fairchild Air Force Base, where it had been one of the three squadrons of the 92d Bombardment Wing. The wing became fully organized on 15 November 1960 when the 43d Air Refueling Squadron moved to Larson from Davis–Monthan Air Force Base, Arizona and re-equipped with Boeing KC-135 Stratotankers. One-third of the wing's aircraft were maintained on fifteen-minute alert, fully fueled, armed and ready for combat to reduce vulnerability to a Soviet missile strike. The wing's final operational squadron, the 568th Strategic Missile Squadron with SM-68 Titan I missiles, was activated in April 1961. The wing's aircraft alert commitment was increased to half the wing's aircraft in 1962. The 4170th (and later the 462d) continued to maintain an alert commitment until April 1966.

SAC responded to the Cuban Missile Crisis shortly after the detection of Soviet missiles on Cuba. On 20 October the wing was directed to put two additional bombers on alert. On 22 October 1/8 of SAC's B-52s were placed on airborne alert and additional KC-135 were placed on alert to replace tankers devoted to maintaining the B-52 bomber force on airborne alert. On 24 October SAC went to DEFCON 2, placing all aircraft on alert. The wing supported the increase in forward deployed Tanker Task Forces were in Spain, Alaska and in the Northeast. On 21 November, due to the strains on its maintenance and flying crews, SAC returned to its normal airborne alert posture. It also relaxed its readiness status to DEFCON 3 and on 27 November the wing returned to normal alert posture.

==== 462d Strategic Aerospace Wing ====
In 1962, in order to perpetuate the lineage of many currently inactive bombardment units with illustrious World War II records, Headquarters SAC received authority from Headquarters USAF to discontinue its Major Command controlled (MAJCON) strategic wings that were equipped with combat aircraft and to activate Air Force controlled (AFCON) units, most of which were inactive at the time, but could carry a lineage and history. (Note: MAJCON units could not carry a permanent history or lineage. Ravenstein, Guide to Air Force Lineage, p. 12. As a result, the 4170th wing was replaced by the newly constituted 462d Strategic Aerospace Wing, which assumed its mission, personnel, and equipment on 1 February 1963. Although the 462d wing was a new organization, it continued, through temporary bestowal, the history, and honors of the World War II 462d Bombardment Group. This temporary bestowal ended in January 1984, when the wing and group were consolidated into a single unit. It was also entitled to retain the honors (but not the history or lineage) of the 4170th.) The 768th Bombardment Squadron, one of the unit's World War II historical bomb squadrons, replaced the 327th Bombardment Squadron, which was inactivated. The 829th Medical Group, 47th Munitions Maintenance Squadron and the 43d Air Refueling Squadron were reassigned to the 462d. Component support units of the 4170th Wing were replaced by units with numerical designation of the newly established 462d Wing. Each of the new units assumed the personnel, equipment, and mission of its predecessor. Under the Dual Deputy organization, all flying and maintenance squadrons were directly assigned to the wing, so no operational group element was activated. (Note: Under this plan flying [and missile] squadrons reported to the wing Deputy Commander for Operations and maintenance squadrons reported to the wing Deputy Commander for Maintenance.)

The 462d Wing conducted training in strategic bombardment and air refueling operations and maintained intercontinental ballistic missile readiness to meet SAC commitments. Its 568th Strategic Missile Squadron served as a deterrent force until inactivating in March 1965. However, "[i]n December 1965, . . . Robert S. McNamara, Secretary of Defense [announced] another phaseout program that would further reduce SAC’s bomber force. Basically, this program called for . . . retirement of all B-52Cs and of several subsequent B-52 models." The wing became non-operational in April 1966 and was inactivated on 25 June 1966 with the closing of Larson.

=== Expeditionary operations ===
In June 2002, the consolidated unit was converted to provisional status and assigned to Air Mobility Command to activate or inactivate as needed. It was activated a few days later at the Naval Support Facility Diego Garcia, where it controlled KC-135R tankers deployed to support Operation Enduring Freedom.

A new approach radar system was brought into service with the group in August 2002.

== Lineage ==
462d Bombardment Group

- Constituted as 462d Bombardment Group (Heavy) (B-29) on 19 May 1943

Activated on 1 July 1943
Redesignated 462d Bombardment Group, Very Heavy 20 November 1943
Inactivated on 31 March 1946
Consolidated with 462d Strategic Wing on 31 January 1984 as 462d Strategic Wing

462d Wing

- Constituted as 462d Strategic Aerospace Wing and activated on 15 November 1962 (not organized)

Organized on 1 February 1963
Discontinued and inactivated on 25 June 1966
Consolidated with 462d Bombardment Group, Very Heavy on 31 January 1984

- Converted to provisional status and redesignated 462d Air Expeditionary Group on 12 June 2002

Activated c. 15 July 2002
Inactivated unknown

=== Assignments ===
- Second Air Force, 1 July 1943
- 58th Bombardment Wing, 1 August 1943
- Second Air Force, 3 November 1943
- 58th Bombardment Wing, 20 November 1943
- XX Bomber Command, 7 July 1944
- 58th Bombardment Wing, ca. 25 April 1945 – 31 March 1946
- Strategic Air Command (not organized), 15 November 1962
- 18th Strategic Aerospace Division, 1 February 1963 – 25 June 1966
- Air Mobility Command to activate or inactivate as needed, 12 July 2002

Attached to 40th Air Expeditionary Wing, c. 15 July 2002 – unknown

=== Components ===
Groups

- 462d Combat Support Group, 1 February 1963 – 2 April 1966
- 829th Medical Group, 1 February 1963 – 2 April 1966

Operational Squadrons

- 9th Expeditionary Air Refueling Squadron, 2002
- 43d Air Refueling Squadron, 1 February 1963 – 2 April 1966
- 345th Bombardment Squadron, 10 November 1945 – 31 March 1946
- 568th Strategic Missile Squadron (ICBM-Titan), 1 February 1963 – 25 March 1965
- 768th Bombardment Squadron 1 July 1943 – 31 March 1946, 1 February 1963 – 2 April 1966
- 769th Bombardment Squadron 1 July 1943 – 31 March 1946
- 770th Bombardment Squadron 1 July 1943 – 31 March 1946
- 771st Bombardment Squadron 1 July 1943 – 12 October 1944

Support Squadrons

- 9th Bombardment Maintenance Squadron, 20 November 1943 – 12 October 1944
- 10th Bombardment Maintenance Squadron, 20 November 1943 – 12 October 1944
- 11th Bombardment Maintenance Squadron, 20 November 1943 – 12 October 1944
- 12th Bombardment Maintenance Squadron, 20 November 1943 – 12 October 1944
- 47th Munitions Maintenance Squadron, 1 February 1963 – 2 April 1966
- 462d Armament & Electronics Maintenance Squadron, 1 February 1963 – 2 April 1966
- 462d Field Maintenance Squadron, 1 February 1963 – 2 April 1966
- 462d Organizational Maintenance Squadron, 1 February 1963 – 2 April 1966

Other units

- 13th Photographic Laboratory (Bombardment Group, Very Heavy), 20 November 1943 – unknown

=== Stations ===
- Smoky Hill Army Air Field, Kansas, 1 July 1943
- Walker Army Air Field, Kansas 28 July 1943 – 12 March 1944
- Piardoba Airfield, India 7 April 1944 – 26 February 1945
- Tinian West Field, Tinian, Mariana Islands 4 April 1945 – 5 November 1945
- MacDill Field, Florida, November 1945 – 31 March 1946
- Larson Air Force Base, Washington, 1 February 1963 – 25 June 1966
- Diego Garcia Naval Support Facility, British Indian Ocean Territory, 15 July 2002 – unknown

=== Aircraft ===
- Martin B-26 Marauder, 1943
- Boeing B-17 Flying Fortress, 1943–1944
- Boeing YB-29 Superfortress, 1943
- Boeing B-29 Superfortress, 1944–1946
- Boeing B-52 Stratofortress, 1963–1966
- Boeing KC-135 Stratotanker, 1963–1966, 2002-unknown
- Martin–Marietta SM-68 (later LGM-25) Titan I, 1963–1965

=== Awards and campaigns ===
Award streamer	Award	Dates	Notes
	Distinguished Unit Citation	20 August 1944	Yawata, Japan 462d Bombardment Group
	Distinguished Unit Citation	23, 25 and 29 May 1945	Tokyo and Yokohama, Japan 462d Bombardment Group
	Distinguished Unit Citation	24 July 1945	Takarazuka, Japan 462d Bombardment Group

Campaign Streamer	Campaign	Dates	Notes
	India-Burma	c. 16 April 1944 – 28 January 1945	462d Bombardment Group
	China Defensive	c. 16 April 1944 – 4 May 1945	462d Bombardment Group
	Air Offensive, Japan	15 June 1944 – 2 September 1945	462d Bombardment Group
	Central Burma	29 January 1945 – April 1945	462d Bombardment Group
	Western Pacific	17 April 1945 – 2 September 1945	462d Bombardment Group
	Global War on Terror Expeditionary Medal	15 July 2002-unknown	462d Air Expeditionary Group

== See also ==
- List of B-52 Units of the United States Air Force
- List of MAJCOM wings of the United States Air Force
