= West Field (Tinian) =

Former World War II airfield on Tinian in the Mariana Islands

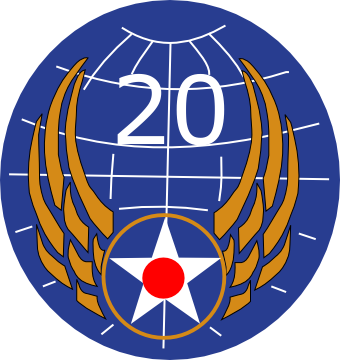
West Field Gurguan Point Airfield
- Part of Twentieth Air Force
- West Field, Tinian, 8 July 1945
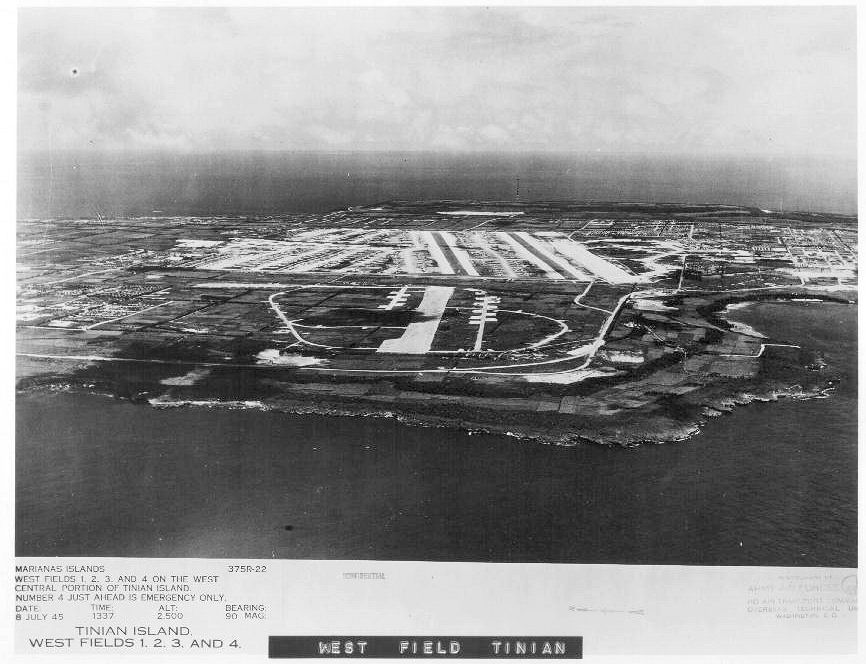

Site information
- Type: Military airfield
- Controlled by: United States Army Air Forces

Location
- Coordinates: 14°59′57″N 145°37′10″E

Site history
- Built: 1944
- In use: 1944–1946

West Field is a former World War II airfield on Tinian in the Mariana Islands. Today, West Field is used as the civilian Tinian International Airport. West Field at Tinian Naval Base was a base for Twentieth Air Force B-29 Superfortress operations against the Japanese Home Islands in 1944–45 and the base for the B-29 Superfortress 58th Bombardment Wing.

== History ==
Tinian, with its sister islands of the Marianas, had passed through Spanish and German hands prior to becoming a protectorate of Japan following World War I. Under Japanese administration, Tinian was largely a sugar plantation. The island had two good airfields with a third under construction by the Japanese in 1944. West Field originated as the Japanese Gurguan Point Airfield, having two parallel runways.

By mid-1944, the Americans had advanced inside the Japanese ring of defense in the Pacific Theater. On Tinian, the United States Army Air Forces could establish bases to conduct long-range strategic offensive air operations over the Japanese Home Islands with the new B-29 Superfortress. The island was assaulted on 24 July 1944 by United States Marines from Saipan, which had just been taken the previous month. After a fierce bombardment, the 4th Marine Division landed. The Japanese were taken by surprise, and the offensive was regarded as one of the best-executed amphibious operations of the war.

== 58th Bombardment Wing ==
Once under American control, a massive construction project was begun on the island, and the Japanese airfield was repaired and expanded, being named as West Field because of its geographical location. West Field became operationally ready in the early spring of 1945, and the Twentieth Air Force XXI Bomber Command 58th Bombardment Wing was assigned to the field, being reassigned from Hijli Base Area, India.

The 58th Bomb Wing had been operating from airfields in India, and at times staging through fields in China since the summer of 1944 as part of Operation Matterhorn. The groups had struck such Japanese targets as transportation centers, naval installations, iron works, and aircraft plants in Burma, Thailand, China, Japan, the Netherlands East Indies, and Formosa. However, by late 1944 it was becoming apparent that B-29 operations against Japan staged out of bases in India and China were far too expensive in men and materials and would have to be stopped. In December 1944, the Joint Chiefs of Staff made the decision that the 58th Bombardment Wing's B-29s would be moved to the newly captured islands in the Marianas in the Central Pacific with airfields built on them to support their operations. The 58th Bomb Wing flew its last operations from India and China on 8 February 1945.

From West Field, the 58th Bomb Wing consisted of the assigned groups:

- 40th Bombardment Group (Triangle S)
- 444th Bombardment Group (Triangle N)
- 462d Bombardment Group (Triangle U)
- 468th Bombardment Group (Triangle I)

B-29s of the wing initiated strategic bombardment operations directly against the Japanese Home Islands. Its units made daylight attacks from high altitudes on strategic targets, participated in nighttime incendiary raids on urban areas, and dropped mines in Japanese shipping lanes. After the Japanese surrender, groups of the 58th Bomb Wing dropped food and supplies to Allied prisoners of war in Japan, Korea, and Formosa, and took part in show of force missions.

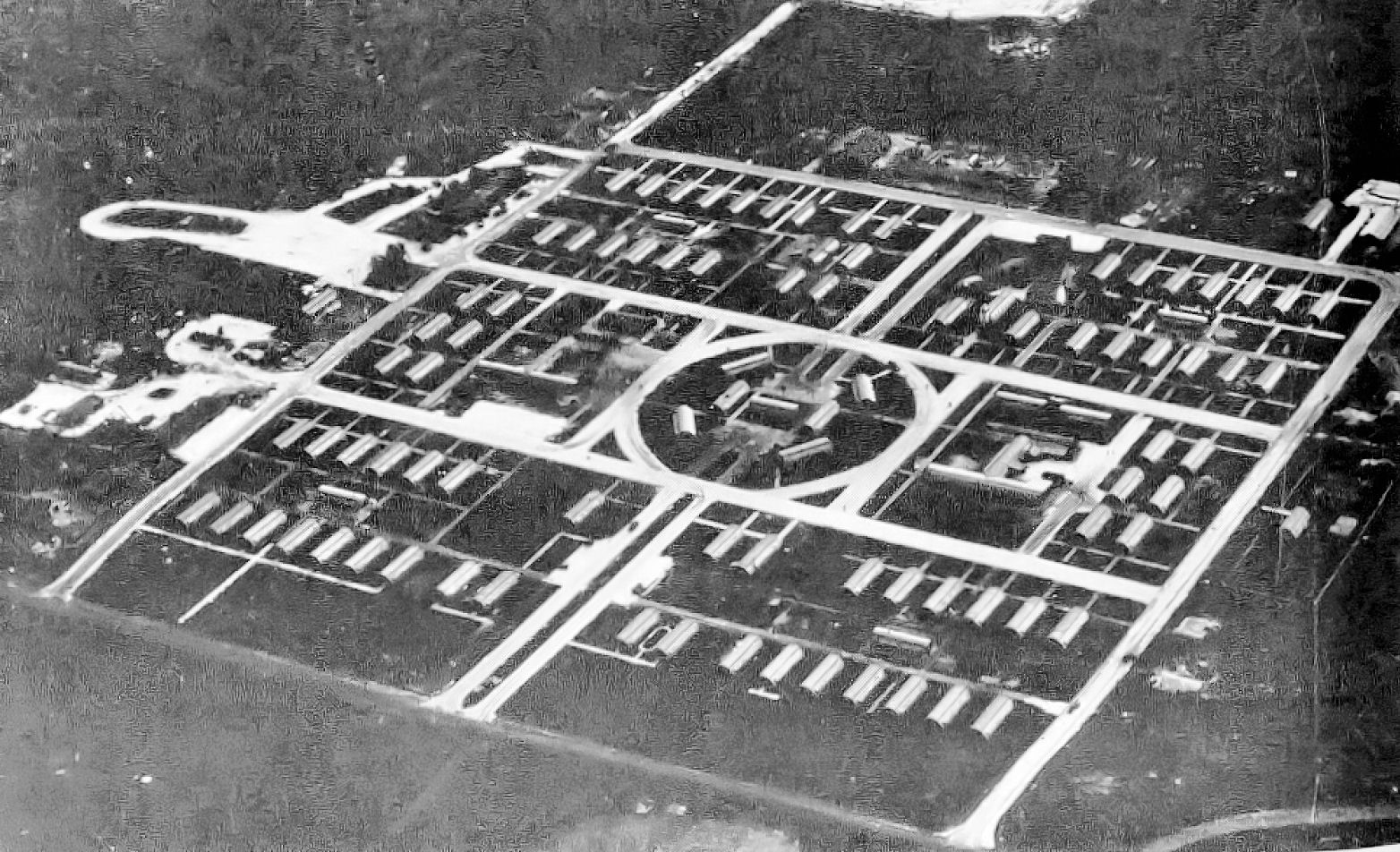
Personnel living quarters, West Field, 1945

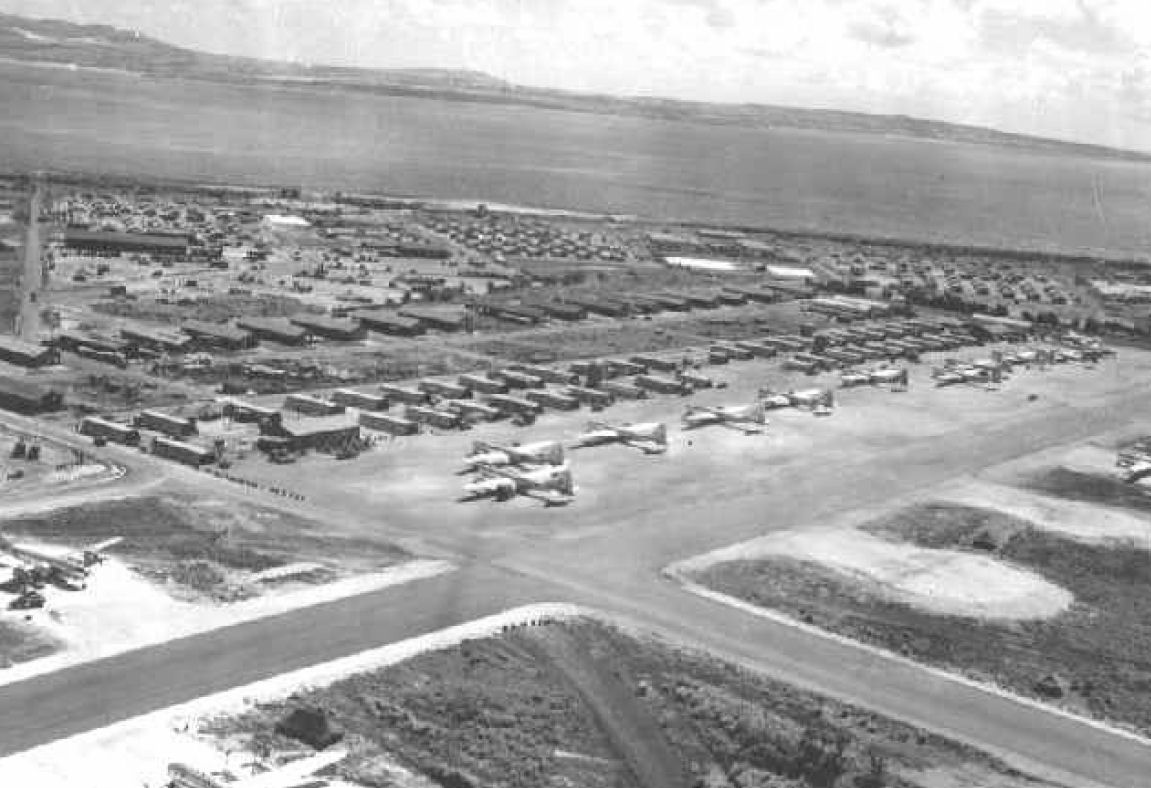
B-29s on parking ramp

Beginning in September, the vast majority of its fleet of B-29 Superfortresses were returned to the United States as part of "Operation Sunset". The 58th Bomb Wing returned to the United States on 15 November 1945, and its subordinate units were either inactivated or reassigned to other bases in Okinawa or returned to the United States. With the departure of the B-29s, West Field was placed in a standby, caretaker status.

== Present ==
With the departure of the USAAF in 1946, a part of the former wartime airfield was converted to a commercial airport, Tinian International Airport, and for general aviation use. Tinian is still considered an important strategic asset by the U.S. to ensure the ongoing availability of a potential forward operating base in the Pacific. Plans were made in 1974 to re-establish a military presence on Tinian, with a joint-service base taking over almost 3/4 of the island. Those plans never materialized, however in 1983, a lease agreement covering these lands was signed and the United States Department of Defense assumed control and possession over the northern two-thirds of Tinian. The lease agreement was for 50 years, with a renewal option for an additional 50 years.

The United States Navy leases the area north of the airport for artillery training and offers tours of the area when not being used for training. In 2013, the United States Marine Corps Wing Support Squadron-171 conducted an arrestment landing exercise using two M-31 Marine Corps expeditionary aircraft arresting gear systems, said systems being similar to those on aircraft carriers, on 5 December at Tinian's West Field during Exercise Forager Fury II.

== See also ==
- North Field (Tinian)
- USAAF in the Central Pacific
