= Qionglai Air Base =

Military air base in Chengdu, China

Qionglai Air Base
- 邛崃机场 邛崃空军基地
- Part of People's Liberation Army Air Force Western Theater command
- Qionglai, Sichuan province, China

Site information
- Type: Air force base
- Controlled by: USAF-1943-1945 ROCAF-1945-1949 PLAAF-1949-Now
- Condition: In use

Location
- Coordinates: 30°29′25.22″N 103°27′54.79″E

Site history
- Built: 1943
- In use: 1943-Present
- Battles/wars: World War II
- Events: 2013 Lushan earthquake

Garrison information
- Garrison: 4th Transport Air Division

Qionglai Air Base (Chinese: 邛崃机场) is a People's Liberation Army Air Force (PLAAF) air base located in Qionglai of the city of Chengdu, the capital of the province of Sichuan in Southwestern China. This entire area is located in the northwestern part of the Sichuan Basin, not far from the foothills of the great Qionglai Mountains.

Based at the Qionglai Air Base is the 10th and 12 Air Regiments of the 4th Transport Air Division which fly Shaanxi Y-9 and Xi'an Y-20 military transport aircraft respectively.

The base is under the Western Theater Command.

== History ==
Built during World War II, the base was used by the United States Army Air Forces 462d Bombardment Group as an airfield to stage B-29 Superfortress bombing missions from India to attack Japan. It was known by the Americans under postal romanization as "Kiunglai Airfield" (often also not quite correctly transcribed as Kuinglai), or under the Wade-Giles transcription, as Chiung-Lai (A-5). It was one of four B-29 bases established by the Americans in China.

From its base at Piardoba, India, the 462d Bomb Group planned to fly missions against Japan from airfields in China. However, all the supplies of fuel, bombs, and spares needed to support the forward bases in China had to be flown in from India over "The Hump" (the name given by Allied pilots to the eastern end of the Himalayan Mountains), since Japanese control of the seas around the Chinese coast made seaborne supply of China impossible.

On June 15, from Kuinglai, the group participated in the first American Air Force attack on the Japanese Home Islands since the Doolittle Raid in 1942. Raids on Japan continued until February 1945. The B-29s attacked Japanese targets in Japan, Formosa, and Manchuria. In October, the Japanese aircraft industry became the priority objective and the aircraft factory at Omura was a regular target. At the request of Maj. Gen. Claire L. Chennault at Fourteenth Air Force, the B-29s struck the main Japanese Army supply base in China at Hankow Dec. 18. They used incendiary bombs, which destroyed the military storage area and left Hankow burning for three days. It was a preview of things to come in 1945, when the B-29s would use firebombs with devastating effect against the highly inflammable wood and paper structures in the Japanese home islands.

The commander of the XX Bomber Command, General Curtis LeMay gained the support of Mao Zedong, the communist leader and an ally in fighting the Japanese. Mao controlled enormous areas in the north, northwest, and east. Mao, hoping for American recognition of his regime, provided assistance to downed airmen, allowed LeMay to put a radio relay station at Yenan, and improved an emergency landing field at Yenan for the use of B-29s. "General Mao offered to build airdromes for us up in the north," LeMay said. "He told me, 'I can construct any number you wish.' I replied that frankly we couldn't supply the ones we already had, down there in Chengtu."

When the B-29 bombers were moved from India in April 1945 to the newly captured bases in the Mariana Islands, the USAAF use of Kuinglai Airfield ended. With the departure of the Americans, the airfield was turned over to Chinese authorities.

The airbase was used to assist with recovery efforts during the 2013 Lushan earthquake.

== See also ==
- Operation Matterhorn
- List of People's Liberation Army Air Force airbases
