= Walker Army Airfield (Kansas) =

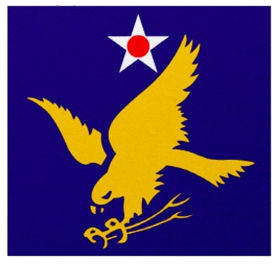
Walker Army Airfield
- Part of Second Air Force
- Located Near: Walker, Kansas
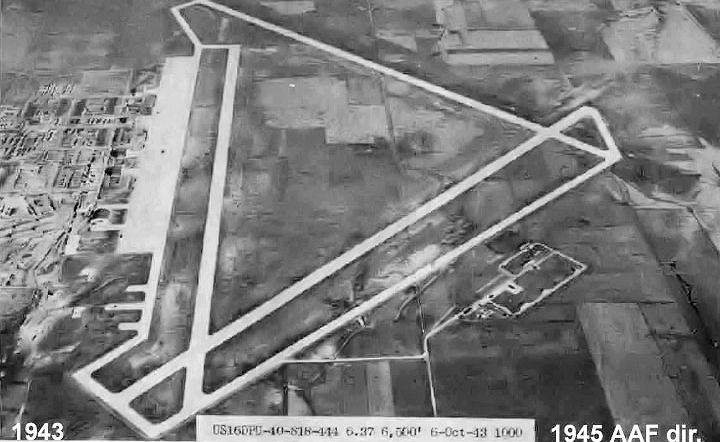
- Aerial Photo of Walker AAF 6 October 1943

Location
- Coordinates: 38°53′40″N 099°06′05″W

Site history
- Built: 1942
- In use: 1942-1946

Walker Army Airfield (also known as Victoria-Pratt Airfield or Walker-Hays Airfield) is an abandoned airfield located north of Interstate 70 in Ellis County, 1 mile northwest of Walker, Kansas or 3 miles northeast of Victoria, Kansas.

Walker Army Airfield (AAF) is significantly historic as it was in the first group United States Army Air Forces B-29 Superfortress bases for initial training on the aircraft in the summer of 1943. Along with Pratt Army Airfield near Pratt, Great Bend Army Airfield near Great Bend and Smoky Hill Army Airfield near Salina the initial cadre of the 58th Bombardment Wing was formed. The 58th Bomb Wing was the first B-29 combat wing of World War II and engaged in the first long-range strategic bombardment of the Japanese Home Islands beginning in March 1944 from bases in India.

== History ==
=== Origins ===
Walker AAF is a very large airfield that today is completely abandoned. It consisting of three runways (each approximately 8,800 ft long), taxiways and a large paved ramp area.

During World War II it was determined Smoky Hill Army Airfield (AAF) near Salina, Kansas needed assistance in processing B-17 Flying Fortress heavy bombardment crews for their shipment overseas. For this reason Walker AAF was constructed. Requisite land for the base was purchased by the government in fee simple from individual owners. Additional areas were leased from the Union Pacific Railroad for the location of storage yards. Other auxiliary facilities were acquired as needed. Three gunnery ranges were acquired in Ellis, Ness, and Gove counties, and three bombing ranges in Trego and Graham counties.

Contracts were negotiated on 26 August 1942, and construction got under way on September 14. Three concrete runways 150 feet in width were paved to a length of 8,000 feet and graded at each end another 1,000 feet so that by adding concrete paving at each end, runways 10,000 feet long would be available. Concrete taxiways 75 feet wide, as well as an apron 300 by 375 feet, were constructed. The cantonment, originally designed for about 1,000 men but later much expanded, was of minimum cost (theater of operation) construction, save for the dispensary and one mess hall which were of mobilization type construction. As an example of subsequent expansion, originally only one hangar was built, but by the time of the field's inactivation five hangars were in use. Completion to the point of limited occupancy was accomplished within 79 days after negotiation of the contracts. The ground station, located to the north of the airfield, consisted of more than one hundred buildings, all intended to be temporary. Station buildings and streets were also constructed, the buildings consisting primarily of wood, tar paper, and non-masonry siding. The use of concrete and steel was limited because of the critical need elsewhere. Most buildings were hot and dusty in the summer and very cold in the winter. Water, sewer and electrical services were also constructed.

The first military personnel at the base were members of a Quartermaster Corps detachment, which arrived from Smoky Hill AAF (aka Schilling Air Force Base), Salina, on November 11, 1942. This advance party was composed of one officer, 2d Lt. Glenn M. Wheeler, and four enlisted men. The first commanding officer of the yet incomplete base was Capt. James E. Altman, who assumed command on December 12, 1942. However, he was quickly replaced by Lt. Col. William A. Cahill on December 18.

The new field acquired its headquarters unit with the activation of the 500th Base Headquarters and Air Base Squadron on 8 February 1943. Real base activity began when the 852d Signal Corps Detachment, the 3d Weather Squadron, the 23d Airways Communications Squadron, the 2064th Ordnance Corps Detachment and a medical detachment were attached to the 500th Base Headquarters and Air Base Squadron for administration, rations, and quarters. Early in 1943 a guard squadron, a quartermaster company, and an airdrome squadron arrived. The field was in good enough condition by 4 July 1943 to enable the commanding officer to hold "Open House."

=== Bomber training ===
Walker Army Air Field began operations simply as a satellite field of Smoky Hill Army Air Field located in Salina. In this capacity Walker was used merely as spillover field in the performance of Smoky Hill's mission of processing heavy bombardment crews for overseas shipment. A more important, and more independent, mission was given to Walker February 1, 1943 when the Second Air Force organized the 6th (later replaced by the 7th) Heavy Bombardment Processing Headquarters there. Walker thus became a processing center in its own right.

By the middle of 1943 a still further expansion of mission was due at Walker. The field was scheduled to begin training B-29 crews for combat duty, and in about August 1943 the first B-29s were brought in. Walker was to function through the remaining active portion of its career within the training program of the 17th Bombardment Operational Training Wing, which had its headquarters at Sioux City Army Base.

As the training program got under way a major problem presented itself in the lack of bombing ranges. Prior to December 1943, Walker had only one bombing range, the result being overcrowding beyond reasonable limits of safety. In an effort to eliminate this dangerous situation arrangements were made with other fields in that area of Kansas whereby planes from Walker could practice bombing on ranges belonging to other fields. A much better solution was found by the acquisition of four tracts of land during December 1943. By the end of January 1944 these ranges were almost ready for use.

The field's mission changed drastically in the middle of 1943 when the 17th Bombardment Operational Training Wing at Sioux City Army Airfield began training B-29 Superfortress crews at Walker. The airfield became one of the first B-29 training facilities in the country and soon one of the finest. B-29s were new planes at the time used for long-distance flying and bombing. Built by Boeing, these aircraft could fly up to 5,830 miles non-stop and reach 365 miles per hour. As more crews came in the bombing ranges became overcrowded and dangerous. Other Kansas fields allowed planes from Walker AAF to use their ranges for a short time. Schedule conflicts arose and, early in 1944, new ranges were constructed for Walker AAF. Also in 1944 a railroad spur was constructed to the field from the Union Pacific Railroad. It was used to bring in equipment and B-29 engines.

All the units permanently stationed at Walker were reorganized on March 25, 1944, and placed in the 248th AAF Base Unit, which assumed the official designation of the 248th OTU (Operational Training Unit) Training School. The new organization was designed to serve as carrying unit for all permanent party activities, as well as to conduct functions of administration, training, supply, and maintenance.

In April 1944 there was established a Directorate of Training which it was anticipated would, when fully manned and equipped, take over and completely train new bombardment groups coming to Walker. This involved preparation of training programs and schedules and the proper coordination of all training activity to ensure fulfillment of Second Air Force requirements with no overlapping or loss of time. Crews in training were taught the fundamentals of B-29 piloting as well as celestial navigating and other important skills. In the fall of 1944 the B-29 Mobile Training Units were organized by the Second Air Force to travel between schools with specialists to teach classes on equipment included in the B-29. One such unit made a stop at Walker AAF. During regular classes, the most experienced instructors to be found taught crews. The combat records set by crews trained at Walker AAF proved this invaluable.

Walker AAF was also equipped with a photographic laboratory. Cameras were mounted onto guns during missions and the film had to be developed before class the next day. Until the end of World War II the number of crews trained at Walker AAF was steady. As one group would complete operational training and prepare to leave, the leading elements of the next group would arrive and training would begin on the new group. Sometimes overlapping of two groups on the field at the same time caused acute, though temporary, housing problems. Besides training bomb groups for overseas, Air Service Groups, such as the 72d, 75th and 367th, were also trained for overseas duty.

From very humble beginnings, both the mission and the physical plant of Walker Army Air Field expanded considerably so that by August 31, 1944, a total of 5,936 personnel were stationed at the field. Out of this total 529 officers and 2,742 enlisted men were stationed for training, leaving a permanent party of 235 officers, 1,781 enlisted personnel, and 659 civilians making the total occupancy of the field 5,936 people. Compared to the original 1,000 occupancy, Walker AAF had grown almost sixfold in just a couple years.

=== Inactivation ===
With victory over Japan in August 1945, the mission of the 17th Bombardment Operational Training Wing changed and slackened. Salina was the only one of the wing's stations to continue combat crew training. Five other stations were to complete the manning and training of the 449th, 467th, 448th, 44th, and 93d Groups, while three stations, including Walker were left with no mission at all.

Consequently, Walker was relieved from assignment to the 17th Bombardment Operational Training Wing and reassigned to the Air Technical Service Command, effective September 30, 1945, and further assigned to the Oklahoma City Air Material Area. The latter then moved into the 4180th AAF Base Unit to maintain the field on a housekeeping basis. On January 31, 1946, Walker was put on inactive status, and disposition of property became the major activity at the field. The inactive status continued until the War Department placed the installation in a surplus category in the middle of 1946. A transfer agreement was drawn up on November 21, 1946, between representatives of Oklahoma City Air Material Area, Walker Army Air Field, Fifth Army and the District Engineers, Kansas City. Subsequently, on 19 December 1946, the field was transferred to the District Engineers.

=== Civil use ===
Portions of the base were leased to a citizen in 1946. Former structures included hangars, maintenance buildings, above-ground storage tanks, warehouses, laboratories, machine shop, hospital, garage, motor pool, paint and dope shop, ordnance storage, chemical weapons storage, and various other structures. The hangars were used for grain storage and the runways for drag racing. From 1948 to 1952, crop-dusting planes were stored in the old Maintenance hangar.

In 1949 the air field was returned to the Air Force and became known as Victoria Auxiliary Field until although apparently no Air Force personnel were ever assigned there. In December 1958 the government held an auction to sell the many acres of the former airfield. The airfield was apparently abandoned at some point between 1965 and 1968.

In 1971, the Air Force leased the NE/SW runway for a study dealing with explosive cratering, however, the current owner of the site has said the study had been done shortly after World War II. The craters are still visible and vegetation and trees have voluntarily grown in the craters.

The land was again sold in 1991, and in 1992 government personnel and the new owners performed a walkover. It was determined there was still hazardous waste left behind from World War II. 30 and 50 caliber casings and bullets were found on the former target range at the north end of the site. Four transformers left over from the war were on the apron and the wartime sewage treatment system in the southwest part of the field was still present although inoperable. A landfill was found half a mile south of the north–south runway. In four 3-foot by 4-foot areas, pharmacy bottles, syringes, mess hall plates, shells, spark plugs, and other items were found. Contaminants were located in the water on the site but fortunately the water was not part of a drinking supply. All pollution was cleaned up with government funds reserved for such operations after the walkover.

Currently, the land is used for grazing and cropland and does not have a designated name.

== Current status ==
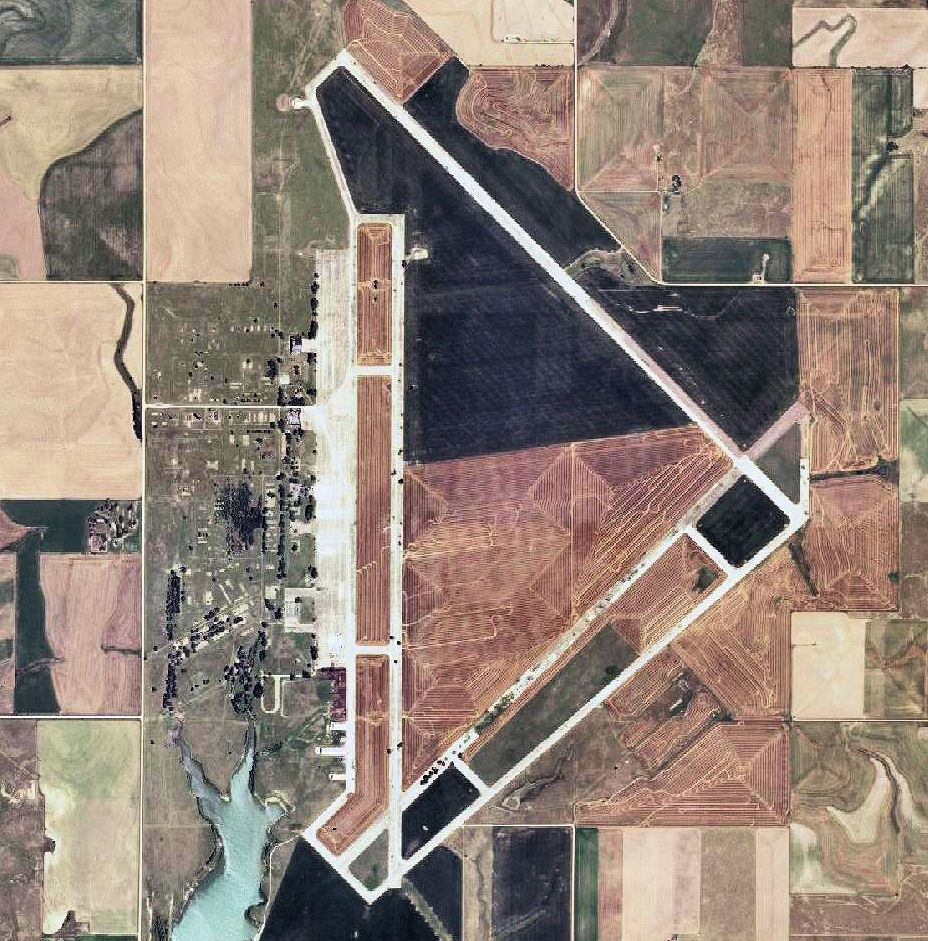
2006 USGS photo of the former Walker Army Airfield

Today Walker AAF has the air of a ghost town. Almost all of the concrete airfield still exists, but the runways and taxiways are in various states of deterioration. In September 1986 there was an unsolved murder of Kenneth Gross. Large craters in the 04/23 runway exist, filled in now by vegetation where the Air Force conducted cratering tests. The expansion joints in most other concreted areas are beginning to separate, with vegetation growing between them. Four hangars on the flightline area exist, one gutted by fire and the others that are standing appear to be unsafe and ready to collapse. Many concrete foundations of the former base support buildings can be found, along with some of the road network. Outlines of the former streets are clearly visible in aerial photography. Given that the cost to clear the land and concrete is likely prohibitive, and the remains of the former structures have little value, the deterioration of the former military airfield is likely to continue into the future.

As of 5/2/2010, work appears to be underway to remove the runways from the area. While access to the area is restricted, one can see from the surrounding roads several very large piles of broken concrete extending the length of the runways, and construction vehicles are moving the concrete from the area. The concrete is being broken up and crushed to various sizes into aggregates for drive ways, roads, and oil battery barriers. Only one of the five hangars still exist in recognizable condition. The runway that was bombed has now been all picked up and crushed. That was the first runway to be recycled.

Walker AAF can be reached by exiting at Kansas highway 255, exit 168 along Interstate 70/US 40. Proceed north about 1/2 mile to Airbase Road, turn right. After about two miles, at the end of the road, turn left. The former main entrance road to the station will be on your right after about 1/2 mile.

As of 9/20/24, the land is free for all to roam with no consequences.

== B-29 (VH) Units trained at Walker AAF ==
- 462d Bombardment Group July 28, 1943 – March 12, 1944

768th, 769th, 770th, 771st Bombardment Squadrons

- 500th Bombardment Group April 16 – July 13, 1944

881st, 882d, 883d, 884th Bombardment Squadrons

- 330th Bombardment Group (VH) August 1, 1944 – January 7, 1945

457th, 458th, 459th Bombardment Squadrons

- 383d Bombardment Group January 14 – August 11, 1945

876th, 880th, 884th Bombardment Squadrons

- 458th Bombardment Group July 25, 1945 – August 21, 1945

752d, 753d, 754th, 755th Bombardment Squadrons

== See also ==
- Kansas World War II Army Airfields
- B-29 Superfortress Development
  - Pratt Army Airfield
  - Great Bend Army Airfield
  - Smoky Hill Army Airfield
