= 497th Air Expeditionary Group =

497th Air Expeditionary Group

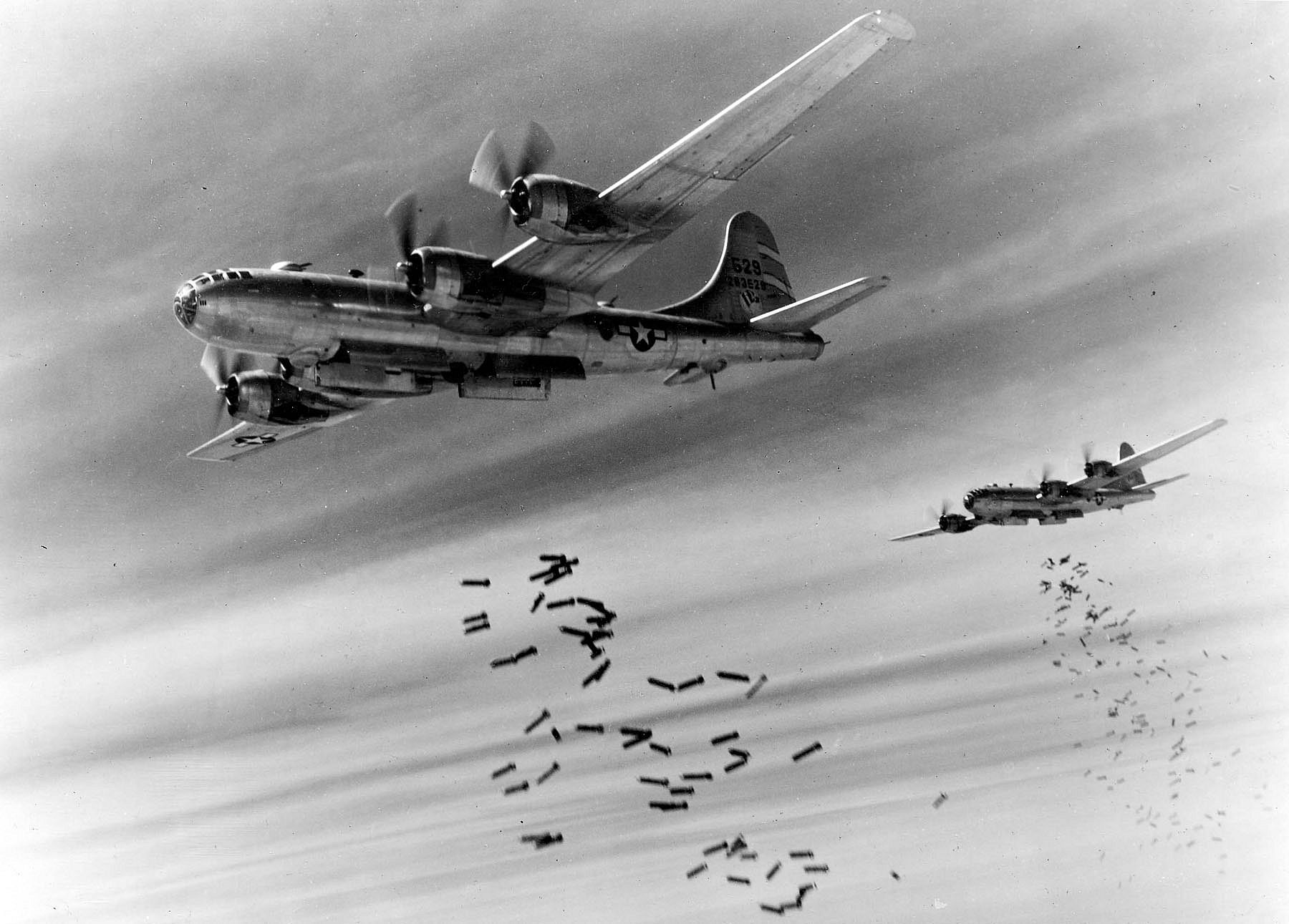
- B-29 Superfortress of the 497th Bombardment Group near Rangoon, Burma (Note: Aircraft is Bell Aircraft built Boeing B-29-25-BA Superfortress, serial 42-63526.)
- Active: 1943–1946; 1962–1964; after 2000
- Country: United States
- Branch: United States Air Force
- Type: Provisional unit
- Role: Exercise control
- Part of: Pacific Air Command
- Motto: Parati Stamus (Latin for 'We Stand Ready')
- Engagements: Pacific Theater of Operations
- Decorations: Distinguished Unit Citation; Air Force Outstanding Unit Award

Insignia
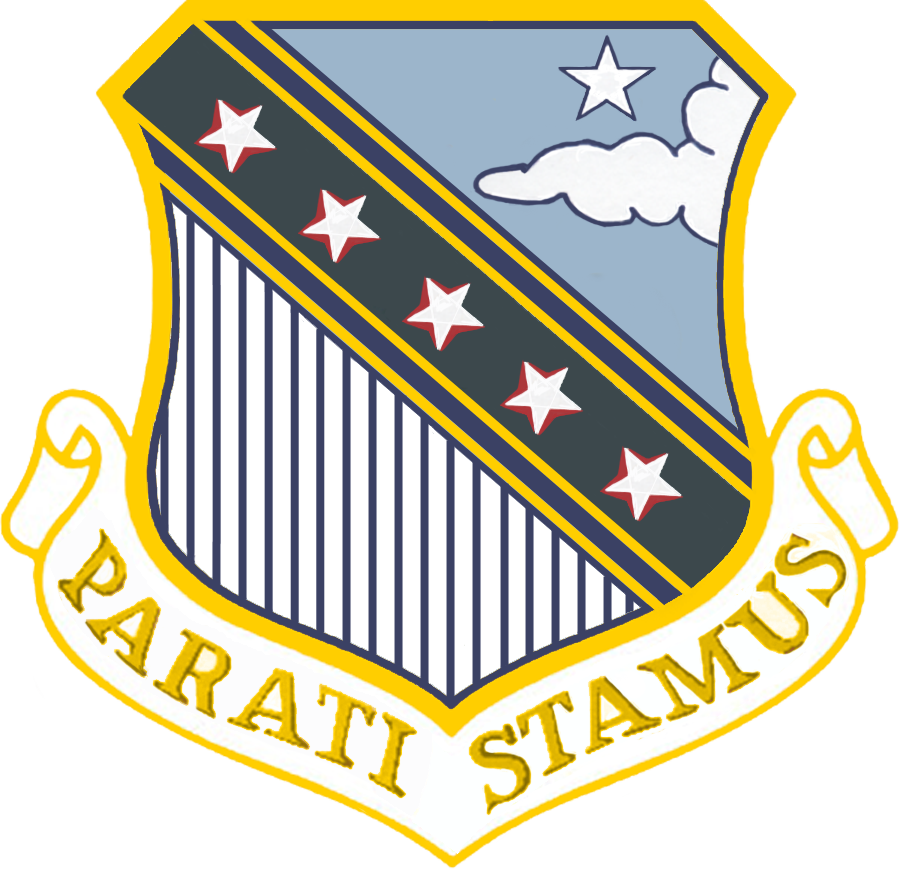
- 497th Air Refueling Wing emblem (Note: Approved 7 February 1963.)

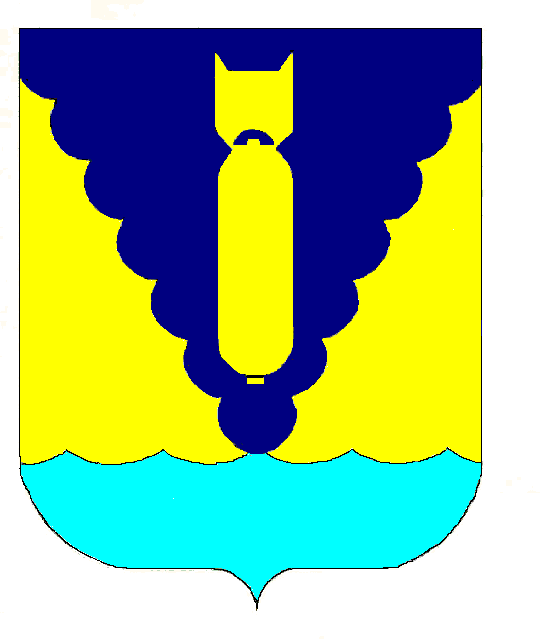
- Emblem used by the 497th Bombardment Group (Note: Emblem in Stewart, et al. Maurer, Combat Units does not show this was ever officially approved.)
- Twentieth Air Force Tail Marking: Square A

The 497th Air Expeditionary Group is a provisional United States Air Force unit. It is assigned to Pacific Air Forces to activate or inactivate as needed.

The unit was first activated in the United States Army Air Forces as the 497th Bombardment Group which was part of Twentieth Air Force during World War II. The 497th engaged in very heavy (B-29 Superfortress) bombardment operations against Japan and earned two Distinguished Unit Citations for its combat actions. Its aircraft were identified by an "A" and a square painted on the tail.

The unit was again active as the 497th Air Refueling Wing, which was an element of Strategic Air Command. It absorbed the personnel equipment, and mission of the 4108th Air Refueling Wing at Plattsburgh Air Force Base, New York in January 1963 and was inactivated in September 1964.

In 1985 the 497th Bombardment Group and the 497th Air Refueling Wing were consolidated into a single unit. The unit was converted to provisional status and assigned to Pacific Air Forces which activated it to control exercises at Paya Lebar Airfield, Singapore various times between 2000 and 2006.

== History ==
=== World War II ===
The unit was established in late 1943 as the 497th Bombardment Group at El Paso Army Air Base, Texas, a Boeing B-29 Superfortress very heavy bombardment group. The unit's original operational squadrons were the 869th, 870th, 871st, and 872d Bombardment Squadrons. It was also assigned four bombardment maintenance squadrons (one paired with each of its operational squadrons) and a photographic laboratory. The group's initial cadre was drawn from the 491st Bombardment Group.

In December the group moved on paper to Clovis Army Air Field, New Mexico, (Note: One officer and three enlisted men moved to Clovis. Stewart et al., p. 26.) although its ground personnel moved to Pratt Army Air Field, Kansas, where they were attached to the 40th Bombardment Group to begin training. At Clovis, the group began to man its air echelon by January 1944. The 497th drew heavily on aircrews of the 480th Antisubmarine Group who were returning to the United States from duty in England and Africa to fill out its flying squadrons. Aircrew training at Clovis was limited to ground training, although some flying in Boeing B-17 Flying Fortress and Consolidated B-24 Liberator aircraft assigned to the 73d Bombardment Wing was accomplished. Key personnel trained with the Army Air Forces School of Applied Tactics at Orlando Army Air Base, Florida.

In April 1944, the group air and ground echelons united at Pratt. Here the 497th finally received newly manufactured Boeing B-29 Superfortresses the following month, although it continued to fly B-17s as well due to continuing engine problems with the B-29s. In May the United States Army Air Forces reorganized its very heavy bombardment units. The 872d Bombardment Squadron and the bombardment maintenance squadrons were inactivated and their personnel absorbed into the remaining three squadrons.

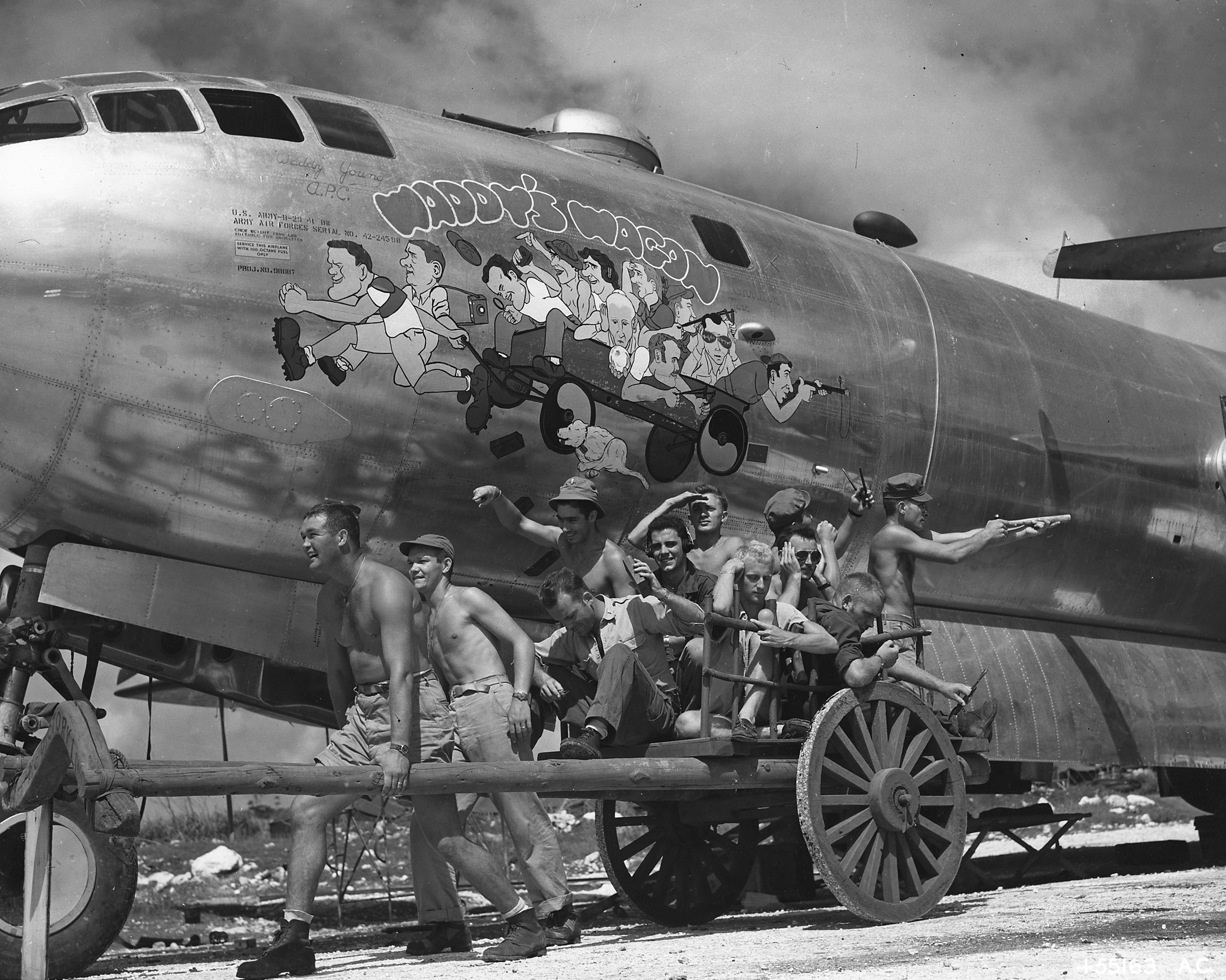
Crew of 869th Bombardment Squadron Waddy's Wagon reenacting the nose art on their plane (Note: Aircraft is B-29 Superfortress 42-24598. This aircraft was lost 9 January 1945.)

The 497th deployed to Pacific Theater of Operations, with the ground echelon sailing on 30 July on the SS Fairisle, passing through Honolulu and Eniwetok before arriving at Saipan on 20 September. Upon arrival, the group's personnel were engaged in construction. By mid-October most personnel were able to move into Quonset huts from the tents which they were assigned on arrival. The aircrews began departing Kansas on 6 October, ferrying their aircraft to Saipan via a 6500 nautical mile route, with the last B-29 arriving on 30 October. The headquarters and staff elements flew to Saipan aboard Air Transport Command Douglas C-54 Skymaster aircraft. At Saipan, the group became part of the XXI Bomber Command at Isely Field.

The group began operations on 28 October 1944, with a night attack against the submarine pens at Truk Island and attacks against Iwo Jima in early November. The group took part in the first attack on Japan by AAF planes based in the Marianas. On 24 November 1944 Major Robert Morgan led the first mission of the XXI Bomber Command to bomb Japan, with wing commander Brigadier Gen. Emmett O'Donnell, Jr. as co-pilot. 110 aircraft of the 73rd Bombardment Wing bombed Tokyo on this mission. The group also suffered its first combat loss on this mission, when a B-29 of the 870th squadron was shot down over the target area. However, this was not the first flight by a 497th aircraft to Japan. Major Morgan and his crew had flown a solo mission on 10 November using radio countermeasures equipment to obtain information on the disposition of Japanese early warning and gun control radars. During December four group aircraft were destroyed in Japanese bombing raids against Isely Field. The 497th flew missions against strategic objectives in Japan, originally in daylight and from high altitude. It was also tasked with "Weather Strike" missions which were single-ship flights flown nightly to obtain weather information for target areas in Japan while also making incendiary attacks on various targets.

The group received a Distinguished Unit Citation (DUC) for a mission on 27 January 1945. Although weather conditions prevented the group from bombing its primary objective, the unescorted B-29s withstood severe enemy attacks to strike an alternate target, the industrial area of Hamamatsu. It was awarded a second DUC for attacking strategic centers in Japan during July and August 1945. The group assisted the assault on Okinawa in April 1945 by bombing enemy airfields to cut down air attacks against the invasion force. Beginning on 19 March and continuing until the end of the war the group made incendiary raids against Japan, flying at night and at low altitudes to bomb area targets. The group released propaganda leaflets over the Japanese home islands, continuing strategic bombing raids and incendiary attacks until the Japanese surrender in August 1945.

After V-J Day, the 497th dropped supplies to Allied prisoners. In November 1945 the unit returned to the United States where it was initially assigned to Continental Air Forces's (CAF) Fourth Air Force at March Field, California. In March, the 513th Bombardment Squadron, a former Fifteenth Air Force B-24 Liberator squadron, joined the group. The 513th was undergoing B-29 very heavy bomber upgrade training. In January 1945, the 497th was reassigned to the CAF Third Air Force at MacDill Field, Florida. In March 1946 CAF became Strategic Air Command (SAC), and the group was one of SAC's first bombardment groups. Demobilization, however, was in full swing and the group turned in its aircraft and was inactivated on 31 March.

=== Cold War ===
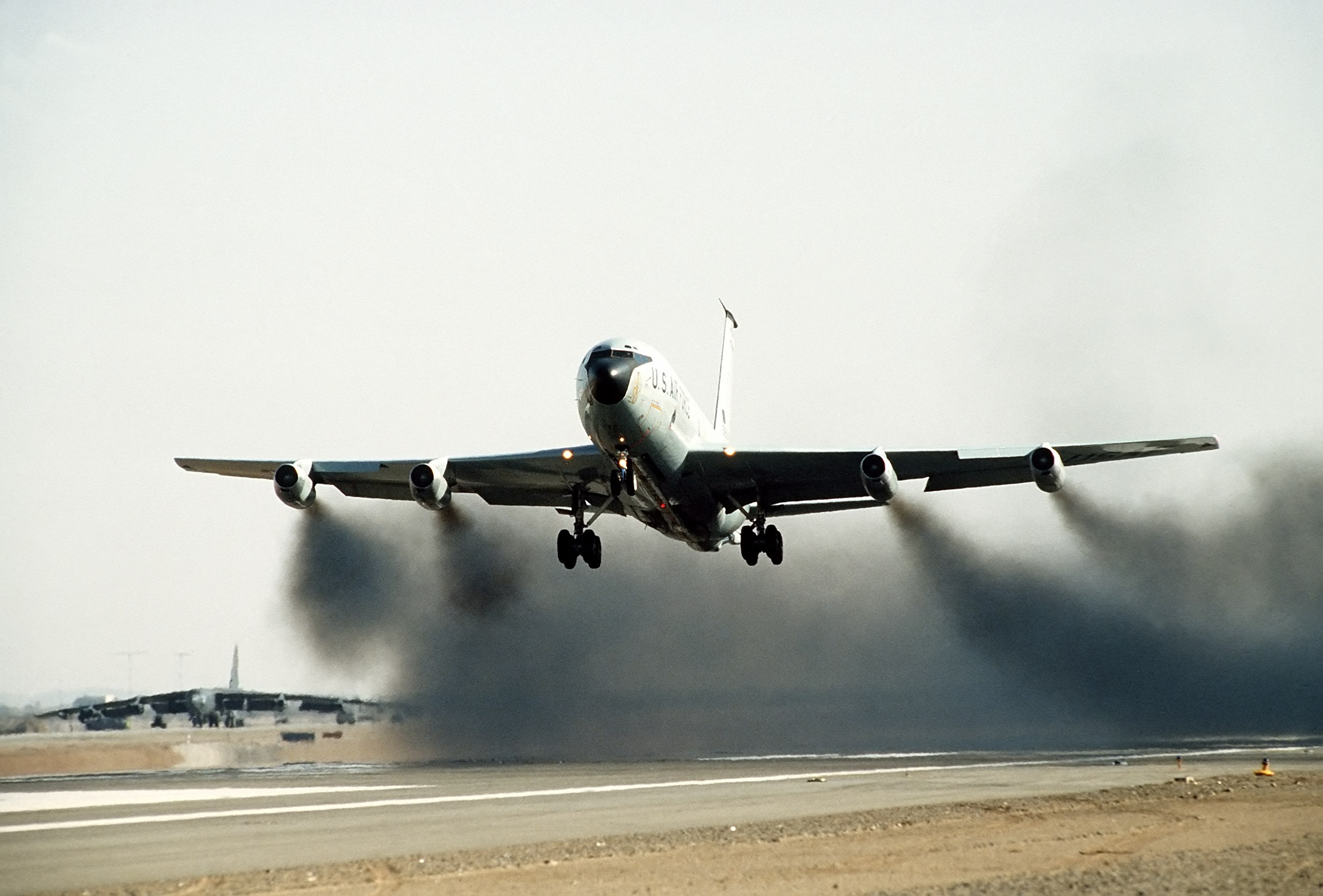
Boeing KC-135 taking off with water injection

In January 1961, SAC separated the two air refueling squadrons of the 380th Bombardment Wing at Plattsburgh AFB, New York into a separate wing, the 4108th Air Refueling Wing. In addition to the 26th and 380th Air Refueling Squadrons, flying Boeing KC-97 Stratofreighters, the wing was assigned three maintenance squadrons. It was assigned to the Eighth Air Force's 820th Air Division (later the 820th Strategic Aerospace Division).

However, SAC Major Command controlled (MAJCON) could not carry a permanent history or lineage. and SAC looked for a way to make these wings permanent. In 1962, in order to perpetuate the lineage of many currently inactive bombardment units with illustrious World War II records, SAC received authority from the USAF to discontinue its MAJCON wings that were equipped with combat aircraft and to activate Air Force-controlled (AFCON) units, most of which were inactive at the time which could carry a lineage and history.

As a result, the 4108th was replaced by the newly constituted 497th Air Refueling Wing, which assumed its mission, personnel, and equipment on 1 January 1963. (Note: Although the 497th Wing was a new organization, it continued, through temporary bestowal, the history, and honors of the World War II 497th Bombardment Group. It was also entitled to retain the honors (but not the history or lineage) of the 4108th. This temporary bestowal ended in January 1984, when the wing and group were consolidated into a single unit. See Ravenstein, Combat Wings, Appendix V, USAF Bestowed History.) The 26th and 380th Air Refueling Squadrons were reassigned to the 497th. Component support units were replaced by units with the numerical designation of the newly established wing.

The wing supported global air refueling missions of SAC and other USAF needs, as required, earning an Air Force Outstanding Unit Award for its performance of the mission. In June 1964 the 380th Air Refueling Squadron became non-operational while it began to convert to newer Boeing KC-135 Stratotankers. The 497th was discontinued and inactivated on 15 September 1964. Its subordinate units were also inactivated with the exception of the 380th Air Refueling Squadron, which was reassigned to the 380th Bombardment Wing.

=== Provisional Unit ===
In 1984 the 497th Bombardment Group and the 497th Air Refueling Wing were consolidated into a single unit,

In 2000, the consolidated unit was converted to provisional status and assigned to Pacific Air Forces to activate or inactivate as needed. It was redesignated as the 497th Air Expeditionary Group. Between 2000 and 2006 the group was periodically activated for Commando Sling exercises, using the 497th Combat Training Squadron as its cadre, augmented by deployed personnel and equipment from Pacific Air Forces fighter squadrons.

== Lineage ==
497th Bombardment Group

- Constituted as the 497th Bombardment Group, Very Heavy on 19 November 1943

Activated on 20 November 1943
Inactivated on 31 March 1946

- Consolidated on 31 January 1984 with the 497th Air Refueling Wing as the 497th Air Refueling Wing

497th Air Refueling Wing

- Constituted as the 497th Air Refueling Wing and activated on 15 November 1962 (not organized)

Organized on 1 January 1963
Discontinued and inactivated 15 September 1964

- Consolidated on 31 January 1984 with the 497th Bombardment Group (remained inactive)
- Redesignated 497th Air Expeditionary Group and converted to provisional status on 12 June 2002

Activations

12 January 2000 – 31 January 2000 Commando Sling 00-3
2 July 2003 – 28 July 2003
28 October 2003 – 24 November 2003 Commando Sling 04-1
27 January 2004 – 15 February 2004 Commando Sling 04-2
14 May 2004 – 10 June 2004 Commando Sling 04-3
29 October 2004 – 26 November 2004 Commando Sling 05-1
10 February 2005 – 10 March 2005 Commando Sling 05-2
26 April 2005 – May 2005 Commando Sling 05-3
1 March 2006 – 25 March 2006 Commando Sling 06-2
26 May 2006 – 25 June 2006 Commando Sling 06-3
13 October 2006 – 9 November 2006 Commando Sling 07-1

=== Assignments ===
- 73d Bombardment Wing, 20 November 1943 (attached to 17th Bombardment Operational Training Wing 15 April 1944 – 18 July 1944)
- Fifteenth Air Force, 21 March 1946 – 31 March 1946
- Strategic Air Command, 15 November 1962
- 820th Air Division, 1 January 1963 – 15 September 1964
- Air Mobility Command to activate or inactivate as needed, 12 June 2002
- Pacific Air Forces after an unknown date

Attached to Thirteenth Air Force, 12 January 2000 – 31 January 2000
Attached to Thirteenth Air Force, 2 July 2003 – 28 July 2003
Attached to Thirteenth Air Force, 28 October 2003 – 24 November 2003
Attached to Thirteenth Air Force, 27 January 2004 – 15 February 2004
Attached to Thirteenth Air Force, 14 May 2004 – 10 June 2004
Attached to Thirteenth Air Force, 29 October 2004 – 26 November 2004

Attached to Thirteenth Air Force, 10 February 2005 – 10 March 2005
Attached to Thirteenth Air Force, 26 April 2005 – May 2005
Attached to George C. Kenney Headquarters (Provisional), 1 March 2006 – 25 March 2006
Attached to George C. Kenney Headquarters (Provisional), 26 May 2006 – 25 June 2006
Assigned to 13th Air Expeditionary Task Force, 13 October 2006 – 9 November 2006

=== Components ===
Operational Squadrons

- 26th Air Refueling Squadron: 1 January 1963 – 15 September 1964 (not operational after 8 September 1964)
- 380th Air Refueling Squadron: 1 January 1963 – 15 September 1964 (not operational after 7 June 1964)
- 513th Bombardment Squadron: 1 November 1945 – 31 March 1946
- 869th Bombardment Squadron: 20 November 1943 – 31 March 1946
- 870th Bombardment Squadron: 20 November 1943 – 31 March 1946
- 871st Bombardment Squadron: 20 November 1943 – 31 March 1946
- 872d Bombardment Squadron: 20 November 1943 – 10 May 1944

Maintenance Squadrons

- 17th Bombardment Maintenance Squadron: 20 November 1943 – 10 May 1944
- 18th Bombardment Maintenance Squadron: 20 November 1943 – 10 May 1944
- 19th Bombardment Maintenance Squadron: 20 November 1943 – 10 May 1944
- 20th Bombardment Maintenance Squadron: 20 November 1943 – 10 May 1944
- 497th Armament and Electronics Maintenance Squadron: 1 January 1963 – 15 September 1964
- 497th Field Maintenance Squadron: 1 January 1963 – 15 September 1964
- 497th Organizational Maintenance Squadron: 1 January 1963 – 15 September 1964

Other

- 15th Photographic Laboratory (Bombardment, Very Heavy): 20 November 1943 – 31 March 1946

=== Stations ===
- El Paso Army Air Base, Texas, 20 November 1943
- Clovis Army Air Field, New Mexico, 1 December 1943
- Pratt Army Air Field, Kansas, 13 April 1944 – 18 July 1944
- Isely Field, Saipan, Mariana Islands, 17 September 1944 – 1 November 1945
- Camp Stoneman, California, 14 November 1945
- March Field, California, 26 November 1945
- MacDill Field, Florida, 5 January 1946 – 31 March 1946
- Plattsburgh Air Force Base, New York 1 January 1963 – 15 September 1964

Paya Lebar Airfield, Singapore, 12 January 2000 – 31 January 2000
Paya Lebar Airfield, Singapore, 2 July 2003 – 28 July 2003
Paya Lebar Airfield, Singapore, 28 October 2003 – 24 November 2003
Paya Lebar Airfield, Singapore, 27 January 2004 – 15 February 2004
Paya Lebar Airfield, Singapore, 14 May 2004 – 10 June 2004
Paya Lebar Airfield, Singapore, 29 October 2004 – 26 November 2004
Paya Lebar Airfield, Singapore, 10 February 2005 – 10 March 2005
Paya Lebar Airfield, Singapore, 26 April 2005 – May 2005
Paya Lebar Airfield, Singapore, 1 March 2006 – 25 March 2006
Paya Lebar Airfield, Singapore, 26 May 2006 – 25 June 2006
Paya Lebar Airfield, Singapore, 13 October 2006 – 9 November 2006

=== Aircraft ===
- Boeing B-17 Flying Fortress, 1944
- Boeing B-29 Superfortress, 1944–1946
- Boeing KC-97 Stratofreighter, 1963–1964

=== Awards and campaigns ===
Award streamer	Award	Dates	Notes
	Distinguished Unit Citation	27 January 1945	Japan, 497th Bombardment Group
	Distinguished Unit Citation	26 July 1945 – 2 August 1945	Japan, 497th Bombardment Group
	Air Force Outstanding Unit Award	1 January 1963 – 30 June 1963	497th Air Refueling Wing (Note: Also received by the 4108th Air Refueling Wing for the period 1 April 1961 to 31 December 1962. AF Pamphlet 900-2, p. 536.)

Manual campaign table

Campaign Streamer	Campaign	Dates	Notes
	Air Offensive, Japan		497th Bombardment Group
	Eastern Mandates		497th Bombardment Group
	Western Pacific		497th Bombardment Group

== See also ==
- List of MAJCOM wings of the United States Air Force
- List of USAF Bomb Wings and Wings assigned to Strategic Air Command
- List of B-29 Superfortress operators
