= Waddy Young =

American football player (1916–1945)

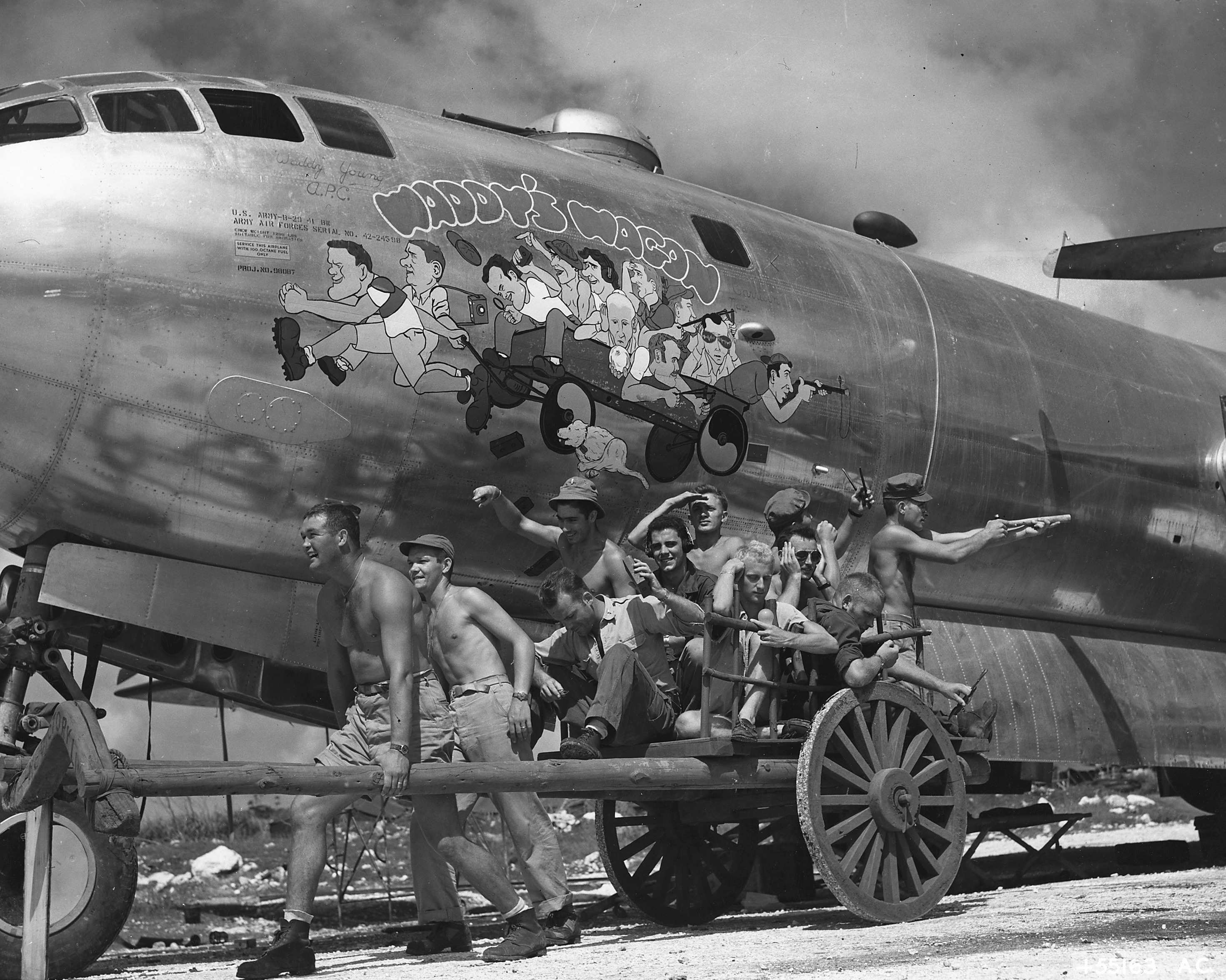
- Young (far left, pulling wagon) and his B-29 crew "Waddy's Wagon"

No. 6
- Position: End

Personal information
- Born: September 4, 1916; Ponca City, Oklahoma, U.S.
- Died: January 9, 1945 (aged 28); Tokyo, Japanese Empire
- Listed height: 6 ft 3 in (1.91 m)
- Listed weight: 205 lb (93 kg)

Career information
- High school: Ponca City
- College: Oklahoma
- NFL draft: 1939: 3rd round, 20th overall pick

Career history
- Brooklyn Dodgers (1939–1940)

Awards and highlights
- Consensus All-American (1938); First-team All-Big Six (1938); Second-team All-Big Six (1937)
- Military career
- Allegiance: United States
- Branch: U.S. Army Air Corps
- Service years: 1942-1945
- Rank: Captain
- Units: 21st Bomber Command, 73rd Bomb Wing, 497th Bombardment Group, 869th Bombardment Squadron
- Conflicts: World War II: European air campaign; Pacific War; Tokyo bombing campaign †
- Awards: Distinguished Flying Cross; Purple Heart; Air Medal (4)
- Stats at Pro Football Reference
- College Football Hall of Fame

Walter Roland Young (September 14, 1916 – January 9, 1945) was an American professional football player who later served in World War II.

== Football career ==
Young was the first consensus All-American football player out of the University of Oklahoma. He led the team to its first Big Six Conference championship as well as its first bowl berth ever, the 1939 Orange Bowl. He also starred as a heavyweight wrestler for the Sooners. After college, he played professionally for the Brooklyn Dodgers of the National Football League, where he played in the league's first televised game. He was selected in the third round of the 1939 NFL draft.

== Military career ==
In 1941, he voluntarily gave up his NFL career to join the United States Army Air Corps, and received his wings in August. After working as an observation group pilot for the First Ground Air Support Command at Pope Field, Young became a pilot of B-24 Liberator bombers; he had hoped to fly fighter planes but was disallowed due to his size.

For 1942, Young was a member of a B-24 anti-submarine patrol launched from Mitchel Field that took part in the Battle of the Atlantic against the Luftwaffe. As the NFL season approached, he played for Wallace Wade's Western All-Army football team; he suffered an injury in an exhibition against the Washington Redskins but returned in time for the following week's game against the Chicago Cardinals. Young continued to serve in the European theater through 1943, seeing particular combat in the Bay of Biscay. Between June 1 and December 29, he flew 25 missions and received a bronze oak leaf cluster on his Air Medal in November.

After being rejected for the Republic P-47 Thunderbolt program, Young was transferred to the Pacific theater in 1944, where he flew a B-29 Superfortress. He was the captain of Crew A-5, 21st Bomber Command, 73rd Bomb Wing, 497th Bombardment Group, 869th Bombardment Squadron, nicknamed "Waddy's Wagon". The crew was one of the first B-29 units to bomb Tokyo.

On January 9, 1945, Waddy's Wagon was returning from a bombing mission on the Nakajima Aircraft Company in Musashino, Tokyo, when Young spotted a B-29 piloted by friend and 1st Lt. Ben Crowell from Crew A-6 with severe damage from a kamikaze attack. Young attempted to protect the plane from further attacks but both aircraft collided, and all crew involved were killed. The final radio transmission from Waddy's Wagon said, "We are okay." Young was posthumously awarded the Distinguished Flying Cross for actions in his final mission.

Young was inducted posthumously into the College Football Hall of Fame in 1986 and named the recipient of the Robert Kalsu Freedom Award, presented by the Oklahoma Sports Hall of Fame, in 2007. The University of Oklahoma Air Force Reserve Officer Training Corps Arnold Air Society squadron and Silver Wings chapter is named in honor of Waddy Young.

== Personal life ==
While living in New York City and playing professional football prior to America's entry into World War II, he met Maggie Moody, a well-known blonde model who attended Oklahoma A&M, and the two fell in love. During halftime of a Brooklyn-New York Giants game in which he was playing, Young had the public address announcer voice his proposal to Maggie, who was sitting in the stands, and the two were later married.

== Awards and decorations ==

Army Air Forces Pilot Badge
Distinguished Flying Cross		Purple Heart
Air Medal with three bronze oak leaf clusters	American Defense Service Medal	American Campaign Medal
European-African-Middle Eastern Campaign Medal with bronze campaign star	Asiatic–Pacific Campaign Medal with bronze campaign star	World War II Victory Medal
