= KPTT =

KPTT may refer to

- KDHT (FM), a radio station (95.7 FM) licensed to Denver, Colorado, which held the call sign KPTT from September 2006 to March 2022
- Pratt Regional Airport, whose ICAO code is KPTT
- KPTT Agricultural Training Center, in Indonesia
