= 497th Bombardment Group =

United States Army Air Forces unit

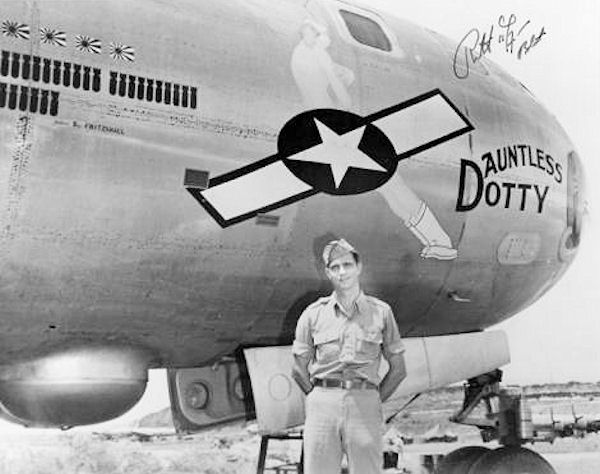
- 869th Bomb Squadron B-29 42-24592 Dauntless Dotty. (Note: Shown is Major Robert Morgan, pilot of the aircraft. On 24 November 1944, he led the first mission of the XXI Bomber Command to bomb Japan, 110 aircraft of the 73rd Bomb Wing to Tokyo, with wing commander Brig. Gen. Emmett O'Donnell, Jr. as co-pilot. His B-29 was nicknamed Dauntless Dotty, after his third wife, Dorothy Johnson Morgan)
- Active: 1943–1946
- Country: United States
- Branch: United States Air Force
- Type: Combat Operations
- Role: Bombardment
- Motto: Parati Stamus (Latin for 'We Stand Ready')
- Engagements: Pacific Ocean Theater

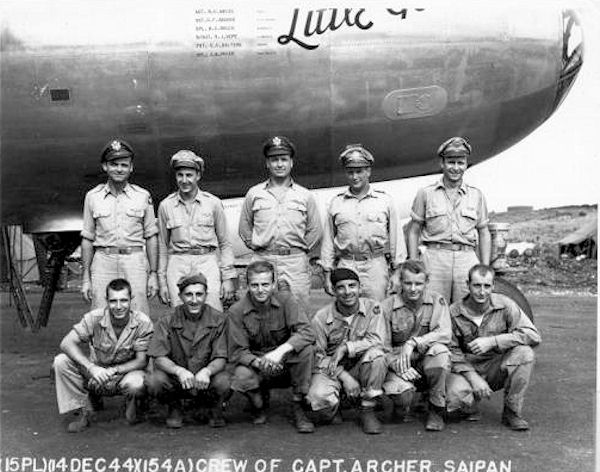
Crew of the 869th Bomb Squadron B-29, serial 42-24592 Little Gem, 4 December 1944.

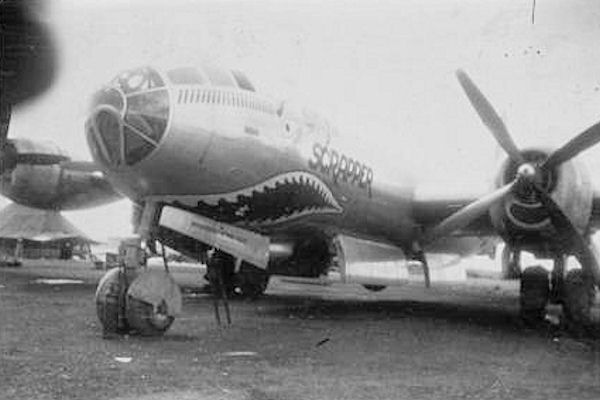
Nose view of 869th Bomb Squadron B-29, serial 42-24599 Scrapper.

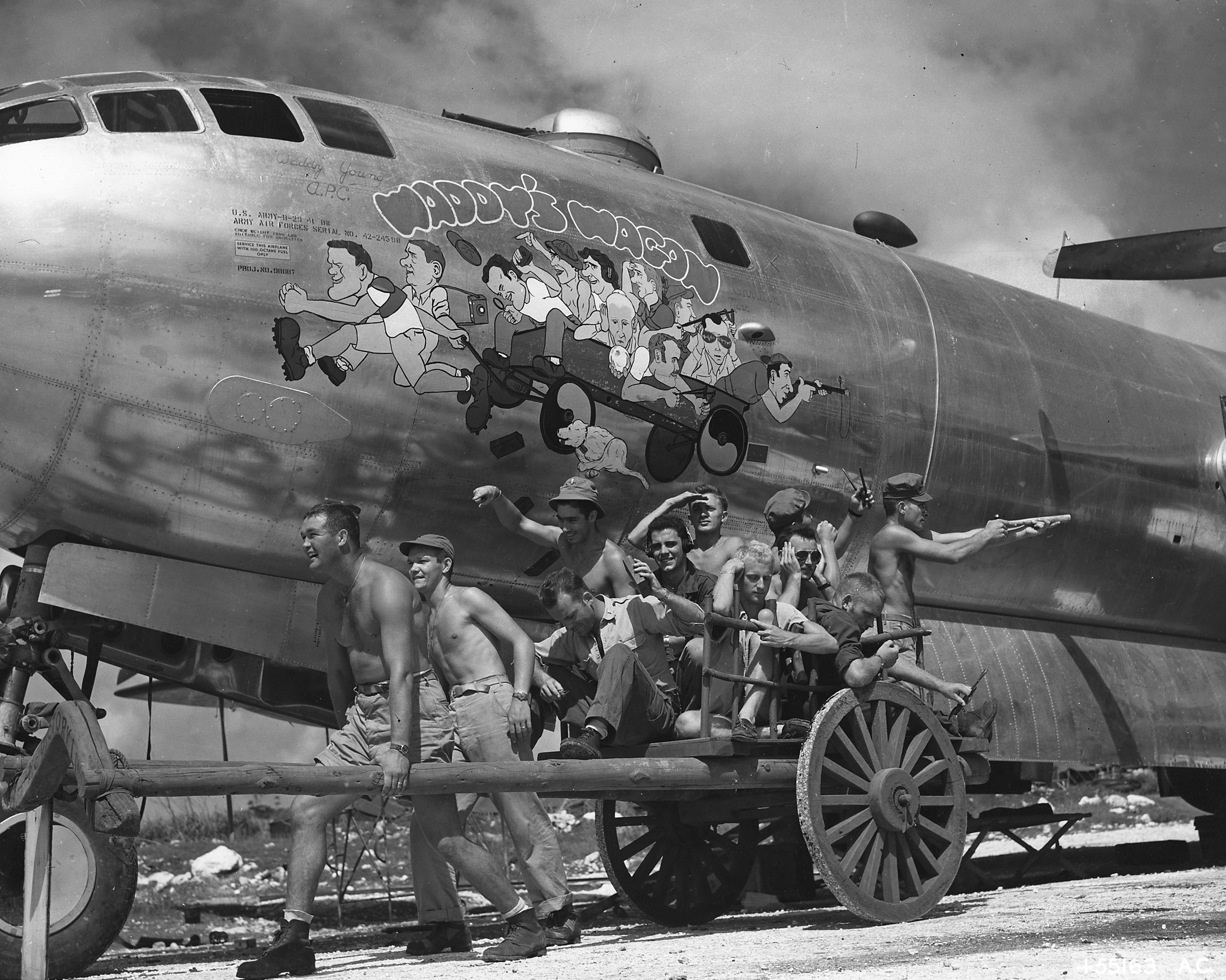
Crew of 869th Bomb Squadron B-29 42-24598 Waddy's Wagon. It was lost on 9 January 1945.

The 497th Bombardment Group was a group of the United States Army Air Forces. The unit was inactivated on 31 March 1946.

The unit was part of the United States Army Air Forces and Twentieth Air Force during World War II. The 497th BG engaged in very heavy (B-29 Superfortress) bombardment operations against Japan. Its aircraft were identified by a "A" and a square painted on the tail.

== History ==
=== World War II ===
The unit was established in late 1943 at El Paso Municipal Airport, Texas, being formed as a B-29 Superfortress Very Heavy bombardment Group. The unit was formed with four bomb squadrons (869th, 870th, 871st and 872d), all being newly constituted.

It moved to Pratt Army Air Field, Kansas in December 1943 to begin training. Due to a shortage of B-29s, the group was equipped with former II Bomber Command B-17 Flying Fortresses already at Pratt which were previously used for training heavy bomber replacement personnel. In the spring of 1944, it finally received newly manufactured B-29 Superfortresses. In May shortages in aircraft and equipment led to the 872d Bomb Squadron being inactivated, with its personnel being consolidated into other group squadrons.

As a three squadron group, the 497th was deployed to Pacific Theater of Operations (PTO) in September 1944, being assigned to the XXI Bomber Command 73d Bombardment Wing in the Northern Mariana Islands; being stationed at Isely Field, Saipan. Upon arrival the group's personnel were engaged in Quonset hut construction. By mid-October most personnel were able to move into the huts from the initial tents which they were assigned on arrival. The group began operations in October 1944 with attacks against Iwo Jima and the Truk Islands. Took part in the first attack (24 November 1944) on Japan by AAF planes based in the Marianas. Flew many missions against strategic objectives in Japan; on numerous raids, made its attacks in daylight and from high altitude.

Received a Distinguished Unit Citation for a mission on 27 January 1945. Although weather conditions prevented the group from bombing its primary objective, the unescorted B-29’s withstood severe enemy attacks to strike an alternate target, the industrial area of Hamamatsu. Awarded a second DUC for attacking strategic centers in Japan during Jul and August 1945. Assisted the assault on Okinawa in April 1945 by bombing enemy airfields to cut down air attacks against the invasion force. Beginning on 19 March and continuing until the end of the war the group made incendiary raids against Japan, flying at night and at low altitude to bomb area targets. The group released propaganda leaflets over the Japanese home islands, July–August, continuing strategic bombing raids and incendiary attacks until the Japanese Capitulation in August 1945.

After V-J Day, the 497th dropped supplies to Allied prisoners, participated in show-of-force missions, and flew over Japan to evaluate bombardment damage. In November 1945 the unit returned to the United States; initially being assigned to Continental Air Forces's (CAF) Fourth Air Force at March Field, California. At March Field, the 513th Bombardment Squadron joined the group; it previously being a Fifteenth Air Force B-24 Liberator squadron based in Italy, having been returned to the United States in May and was undergoing B-29 Very Heavy Bomber upgrade training in Nebraska when its former assigned group, the 376th Bombardment Group, was inactivated.

In January 1945, the 497th was reassigned to the CAF Third Air Force at MacDill Field, Florida. It later was transferred to the new Strategic Air Command on 21 March 1946, being one of SAC's initial bombardment groups. Demobilization, however, was in full swing and the group turned in its aircraft and was inactivated on 31 March.

=== Lineage ===
- Constituted as 497th Bombardment Group, Very Heavy on 19 November 1943

Activated on 20 November 1943
Inactivated on 31 March 1946

=== Assignments ===
- 73d Bombardment Wing, 20 November 1943 – 31 March 1946 (attached to 17th Bombardment Operational Training Wing), 13 April 1944 – 18 July 1944

=== Components ===
- 513th Bombardment Squadron: 1 November 1945 – 31 March 1946
- 869th Bombardment Squadron: 20 November 1943 – 31 March 1946
- 870th Bombardment Squadron: 20 November 1943 – 31 March 1946
- 871st Bombardment Squadron: 20 November 1943 – 31 March 1946
- 872d Bombardment Squadron: 20 November 1943 – 10 May 1944
- 15th Photographic Laboratory Squadron

=== Stations ===
- El Paso Municipal Airport, Texas, 20 November – 1 December 1943
- Clovis Army Air Field, New Mexico, December 1943 – 13 April 1944
- Pratt Army Air Field, Kansas, 13 April – 18 July 1944
- Isely Field, Saipan, Mariana Islands, 17 September 1944 – 1 November 1945
- Camp Stoneman, California, 14–26 November 1945
- March Field, California, 26 November 1945 – 5 January 1946
- MacDill Field, Florida, 5 January – 31 March 1946
