= 872nd Bombardment Squadron =

Provisional unit of the United States Air Force

872nd Bombardment Squadron (later 872nd Air Expeditionary Squadron)

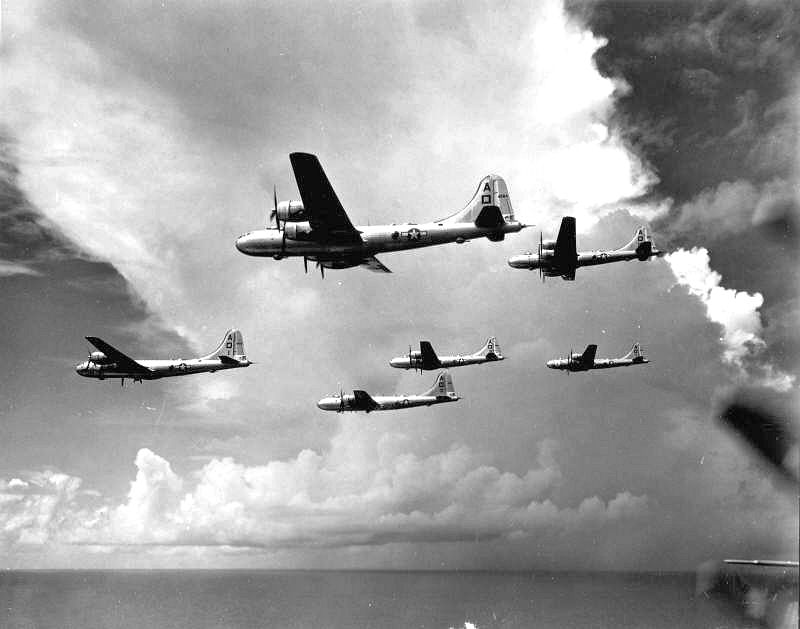
- 497th Bomb Group B-29 Formation
- Active: 1943–1944; 1944–1946; 2007; 2009
- Country: United States
- Branch: United States Air Force
- Role: Expeditionary support
- Part of: United States Air Forces Europe
- Engagements: American Theater of World War II; Pacific Theater of Operations

The 872nd Bombardment Squadron is the former name of the 872nd Air Expeditionary Squadron, a provisional unit of the United States Air Force. It is assigned to United States Air Forces Europe to activate or inactivate as needed.

The squadron was first activated in November 1943 as the 872nd Bombardment Squadron, one of the original squadrons of the 497th Bombardment Group. It was inactivated in May 1944 when Boeing B-29 Superfortress groups of the Army Air Forces were reorganized to have three, rather than four, squadrons. It was activated again in September 1944 as part of the 382nd Bombardment Group. Although the squadron's ground echelon deployed to the Pacific, its air echelon remained in the United States until it was inactivated in January 1946.

== History ==
=== World War II ===
The squadron was established in November 1943 as the 872nd Bombardment Squadron at El Paso Army Air Base, Texas, a Boeing B-29 Superfortress very heavy bombardment squadron that was one of the original operational squadrons of the 497th Bombardment Group. The squadron's initial cadre was drawn from the 491st Bombardment Group.

In December the squadron moved on paper to Clovis Army Air Field, New Mexico. At Clovis, the squadron began to man its air echelon by January 1944. The 872nd drew heavily on aircrews of the 480th Antisubmarine Group who were returning to the United States from duty in England and Africa to fill out its crews. Aircrew training at Clovis was limited to ground training, although some flying in Boeing B-17 Flying Fortress and Consolidated B-24 Liberator aircraft assigned to the 73d Bombardment Wing was accomplished. Key personnel trained with the Army Air Forces School of Applied Tactics at Orlando Army Air Base, Florida.

In April 1944, the air and ground echelons united at Pratt Army Air Field, although its personnel were detached to other units of the group. In May the United States Army Air Forces reorganized its very heavy bombardment units. Shortly after arrival at Pratt, the 872nd Bombardment Squadron and the support units of the 497th group were inactivated and their personnel absorbed into the remaining squadrons of the group.

The squadron was reactivated four months later as an element of the 382nd Bombardment Group at Dalhart Army Air Field, Texas. Its ground echelon deployed to Tinian by ship in early August 1945 while the air echelon remained at Smoky Hill Army Air Field, Kansas after the Japanese surrender. The ground echelon remained in the Marianas supporting other units' aircraft. The air echelon inactivated in Kansas in August 1945. The ground echelon returned to the United States in December 1945 and was inactivated at the port of embarkation in January 1946.

=== Expeditionary unit ===
In 2007 the squadron was converted to provisional status as the 872nd Air Expeditionary Squadron and assigned to United States Air Forces Europe to activate or inactivate as needed. It was activated in 2007 at Bulboaca, Moldava and in 2009 at Keflavik International Airport, Iceland.

== Lineage ==
- Constituted as the 872nd Bombardment Squadron, Very Heavy on 19 November 1943

Activated on 20 November 1943
Inactivated on 10 May 1944

- Activated on 19 September 1944

Inactivated on 4 January 1946

- Converted to provisional status and redesignated 871st Air Expeditionary Squadron on 2 July 2007

Activated on 21 July 2007
Inactivated on 17 August 2007
Activated on 28 July 2009
Inactivated on 1 September 2009

=== Assignments ===
- 497th Bombardment Group: 20 Nov 1943 – 10 May 1944
- 382nd Bombardment Group: 19 September 1944 – 4 January 1946
- United States Air Forces Europe to activate or inactivate as required: 2 July 2007

322nd Air Expeditionary Group: 21 July 2007 – 17 August 2007
322nd Air Expeditionary Group: 28 July 2009 – 1 September 2009 (attached to 48th Fighter Wing)

=== Stations ===
- El Paso Army Air Base, Texas, 20 November 1943
- Clovis Army Air Field, New Mexico, 1 December 1943
- Pratt Army Air Field, Kansas, 13 April 1944 – 10 May 1944
- Dalhart Army Air Field, Texas, 19 September 1944
- Smoky Hill Army Air Field, Kansas, 11 December 1944 – 1 August 1945 (air echelon)
- Guam, 8 September 1945 (ground echelon only; air echelon remained in US until inactivation)
- Tinian, c. Oct-15 Dec 1945 (ground echelon only)
- Camp Anza, California, 28 December 1945 – 4 January 1946
- Bulboaca, Moldava, 21 July 2007 – 17 August 2007
- Keflavik International Airport, Iceland, 28 July 2009 – 1 September 2009

=== Aircraft ===
- Boeing B-17 Flying Fortress, 1944
- Consolidated B-24 Liberator, 1944
- Boeing B-29 Superfortress, 1945
