= 870th Bombardment Squadron =

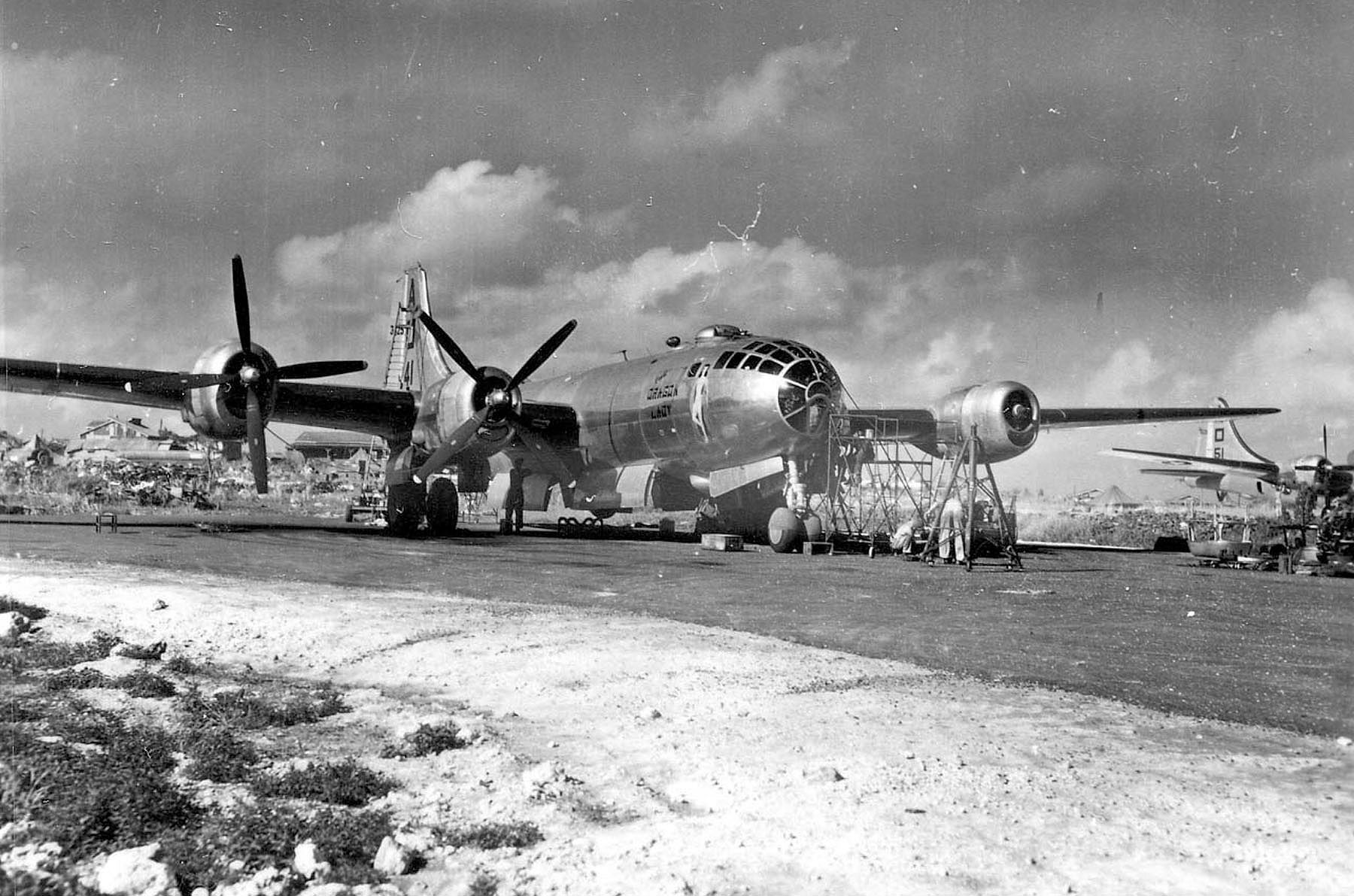
- A 497th Bombardment Group B-29 Superfortress undergoing maintenance at Isely Field 1945 (Note: Aircraft is Bell Aircraft built Boeing B-29-15-BA Superfortress, serial 42-63425, Dragon Lady. Later renamed Terrible Terry. This plane returned to the US after the war and was reclaimed at Davis-Monthan Air Force Base on 1 November 1948. Baugher, Joe (10 June 2023). "1942 USAF Serial Numbers". Joe Baugher.)
- Active: 1943–1946
- Country: United States
- Branch: United States Army Air Forces
- Role: Bombardment
- Engagements: Strategic air offensive against Japan
- Decorations: Distinguished Unit Citation

Insignia
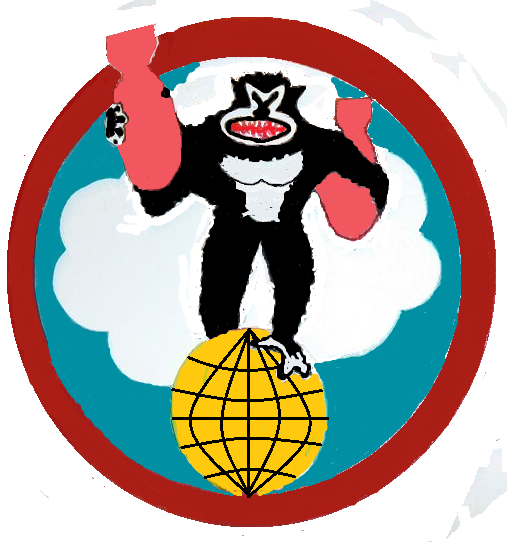
- 870th Bombardment Squadron Emblem (Note: Approved 18 August 1944. Description: Over and through a medium blue disc, wide border dark red, a gorilla affronte, proper, standing on a yellow sphere marked with black lines of latitude and longitude, in base, and holding a large light red aerial bomb under the left arm, while hurling a like aerial bomb with an upraised right arm, all in front of a large white cloud formation.)

The 870th Bombardment Squadron is a former United States Army Air Forces unit. It was assigned to the 497th Bombardment Group, and was last stationed at MacDill Field, Florida where it was inactivated on 31 March 1946. The squadron was activated in late 1943. After training in the United States, it moved to Saipan in the Central Pacific Area, where it served in the strategic bombing campaign against Japan with Twentieth Air Force, flying Boeing B-29 Superfortress aircraft, where it earned two Distinguished Unit Citations. Following V-J Day, the squadron returned to the United States and briefly became part of Strategic Air Command before inactivating.

== History ==
=== Activation and training ===
The squadron was established in late 1943 as the 870th Bombardment Squadron at El Paso Army Air Base, Texas, a Boeing B-29 Superfortress very heavy bombardment squadron that was one of the original operational squadrons of the 497th Bombardment Group. The squadron's initial cadre was drawn from the 491st Bombardment Group.

In December the squadron moved on paper to Clovis Army Air Field, New Mexico. At Clovis, the squadron began to man its air echelon by January 1944. The 870th drew heavily on aircrews of the 480th Antisubmarine Group who were returning to the United States from duty in England and Africa to fill out its crews. Aircrew training at Clovis was limited to ground training, although some flying in Boeing B-17 Flying Fortress and Consolidated B-24 Liberator aircraft assigned to the 73d Bombardment Wing was accomplished. Key personnel trained with the Army Air Forces School of Applied Tactics at Orlando Army Air Base, Florida.

In April 1944, the air and ground echelons united at Pratt Army Air Field. Here the 870th finally received newly manufactured Boeing B-29 Superfortresses the following month, although it continued to fly B-17s as well due to continuing engine problems with the B-29s. In May the United States Army Air Forces reorganized its very heavy bombardment units. The 872d Bombardment Squadron and support units of the 497th group were inactivated and their personnel absorbed into the 870th and the remaining squadrons of the group.

=== Combat in the Pacific ===
The 870th deployed to the Pacific Theater of Operations, with the ground echelon sailing 30 July on the SS Fairisle, passing through Honolulu and Eniwetok before arriving at Saipan on 20 September. Upon arrival the squadron's personnel were engaged in construction. By mid-October most personnel were able to move into Quonset huts from the tents which they were assigned on arrival. The aircrews began departing Kansas on 6 October, ferrying their aircraft to Saipan via a 6500 nautical mile route, with the last B-29 arriving on 30 October. At Saipan the unit became part of the XXI Bomber Command at Isely Field.

The squadron began operations on 28 October 1944 with a night attack against the submarine pens at Truk Islands and attacks against Iwo Jima in early November. The squadron took part in the first attack on Japan by AAF planes based in the Marianas. On 24 November 1944 110 aircraft of the 73rd Bombardment Wing bombed Tokyo on this mission. The squadron suffered its first combat loss on this mission, when a B-29 was shot down over the target area. The 870th flew missions against strategic objectives in Japan, originally in daylight and from high altitude. It was also tasked with "Weather Strike" missions which were single ship flights flown nightly to obtain weather information for target areas in Japan while also making incendiary attacks on various targets.

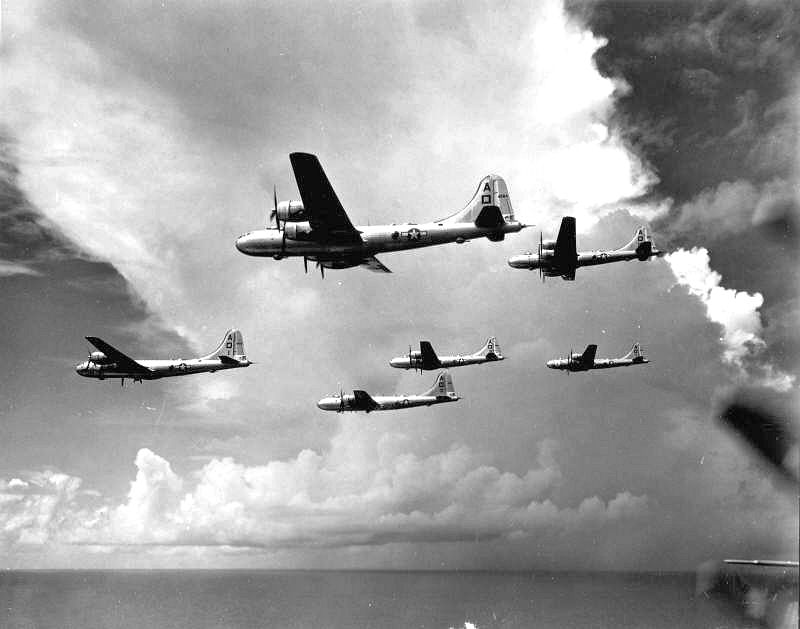
Formation of 497th Bombardment Group B-29s showing Square A tail marking

The squadron received a Distinguished Unit Citation (DUC) for a mission on 27 January 1945. Although weather conditions prevented the group from bombing its primary objective, the unescorted B-29's withstood severe enemy attacks to strike an alternate target, the industrial area of Hamamatsu. It was awarded a second DUC for attacking strategic centers in Japan during July and August 1945. The squadron assisted the assault on Okinawa in April 1945 by bombing enemy airfields to cut down air attacks against the invasion force. Beginning on 19 March and continuing until the end of the war the squadron made incendiary raids against Japan, flying at night and at low altitude to bomb area targets. The unit released propaganda leaflets over the Japanese home islands, continuing strategic bombing raids and incendiary attacks until the Japanese surrender in August 1945.

=== Return to the United States and inactivation ===
After V-J Day, the 870th dropped supplies to Allied prisoners. In November 1945 the unit returned to the United States where it became part of Continental Air Forces (CAF) at March Field, California. In January 1945, the 870th moved to MacDill Field, Florida. In March 1946 CAF became Strategic Air Command (SAC), and the squadron was one of SAC's first bombardment squadrons. Demobilization, however, was in full swing and the squadron turned in its aircraft and was inactivated on 31 March.

== Lineage ==
- Constituted as the 870th Bombardment Squadron, Very Heavy on 19 November 1943

Activated on 20 November 1943
Inactivated on 31 March 1946

=== Assignments ===
- 497th Bombardment Group: 20 November 1943 – 31 March 1946

=== Stations ===
- El Paso Army Air Base, Texas, 20 November 1943
- Clovis Army Air Field, New Mexico, 1 December 1943
- Pratt Army Air Field, Kansas, 13 April 1944 – 17 July 1944
- Isely Field, Saipan, 17 September 1944 – 1 November 1945
- Camp Stoneman, California, 14 November 1945
- March Field, California, c. 26 November 1945
- MacDill Field, Florida, c. 5 January – 31 March 1946

=== Awards and campaigns ===
Award streamer	Award	Dates	Notes
	Distinguished Unit Citation	27 January 1945	Japan 870th Bombardment Squadron
	Distinguished Unit Citation	26 July 1945 – 2 August 1945	Japan 870th Bombardment Squadron

Campaign Streamer	Campaign	Dates	Notes
	Air Offensive, Japan	17 September 1944 – 2 September 1945	870th Bombardment Squadron
	Eastern Mandates	17 September 1944 – 14 April 1944	870th Bombardment Squadron
	Western Pacific	17 April 1945 – 2 September 1945	870th Bombardment Squadron

=== Aircraft ===
- Boeing B-17 Flying Fortress, 1944
- Boeing B-29 Superfortress, 1944–1946
