= 871st Bombardment Squadron =

871st Bombardment Squadron (later 871st Air Expeditionary Squadron)

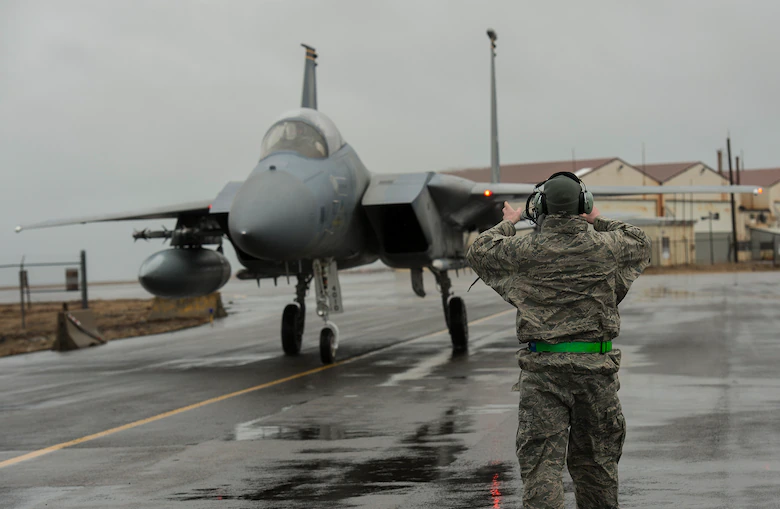
- A squadron F-15 Eagle arrives at Keflavik International Airport
- Active: 1943-1946; 2008; 2015
- Country: United States
- Branch: United States Air Force
- Role: Expeditionary support
- Engagements: Pacific Theater of Operations
- Decorations: Distinguished Unit Citation

Insignia
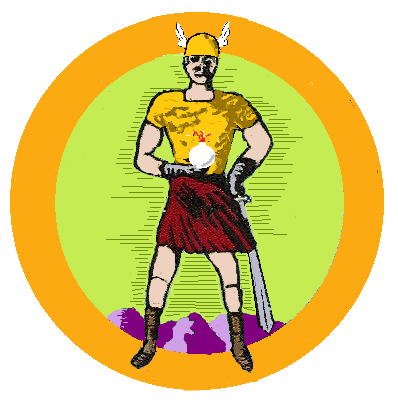
- 871 Bombardment Sq emblem (Note: Approved 5 August 1944. Description: Over and through a light pastel green disc, wide border orange, an ancient warrior of giant stature, standing affronte, feet apart, left hand resting on hip, attired in battle dress of gold mail, and wearing a winged gold helmet and metallic gloves, having a broad sword of metal, proper, strapped about the waist by a green sword belt, holding a white fire bomb in the right mailed hand; all in front of three lavender and purple mountain peaks in base and casting a dark green line shadow on background.)

The 871st Bombardment Squadron is an inactive United States Air Force unit. During World War II it was assigned to the 497th Bombardment Group until it was inactivated on 31 March 1946. The squadron was activated in late 1943. After training in the United States, it moved to Saipan, where it served in the strategic bombing campaign against Japan with Twentieth Air Force, flying Boeing B-29 Superfortress aircraft in the Pacific Theater of Operations, where it earned two Distinguished Unit Citations. Following V-J Day, the squadron returned to the United States and briefly became part of Strategic Air Command before inactivating.

In 2007 the squadron was converted to provisional status as the 871st Air Expeditionary Squadron and assigned to United States Air Forces Europe to activate or inactivate as needed. It was activated in 2008 at Accra, Ghana.

== History ==
=== Activation and training ===
The squadron was established in late 1943 as the 871st Bombardment Squadron at El Paso Army Air Base, Texas, a Boeing B-29 Superfortress very heavy bombardment squadron that was one of the original operational squadrons of the 497th Bombardment Group. The squadron's initial cadre was drawn from the 491st Bombardment Group.

In December the squadron moved on paper to Clovis Army Air Field, New Mexico. At Clovis, the squadron began to man its air echelon by January 1944. The 871st drew heavily on aircrews of the 480th Antisubmarine Group who were returning to the United States from duty in England and Africa to fill out its crews. Aircrew training at Clovis was limited to ground training, although some flying in Boeing B-17 Flying Fortress and Consolidated B-24 Liberator aircraft assigned to the 73d Bombardment Wing was accomplished. Key personnel trained with the Army Air Forces School of Applied Tactics at Orlando Army Air Base, Florida.

In April 1944, the air and ground echelons united at Pratt Army Air Field. Here the 871st finally received newly manufactured Boeing B-29 Superfortresses the following month, although it continued to fly B-17s as well due to continuing engine problems with the B-29s. In May the United States Army Air Forces reorganized its very heavy bombardment units. The 872d Bombardment Squadron and support units of the 497th group were inactivated and their personnel absorbed into the 871st and the remaining squadrons of the group.

=== Combat in the Pacific ===
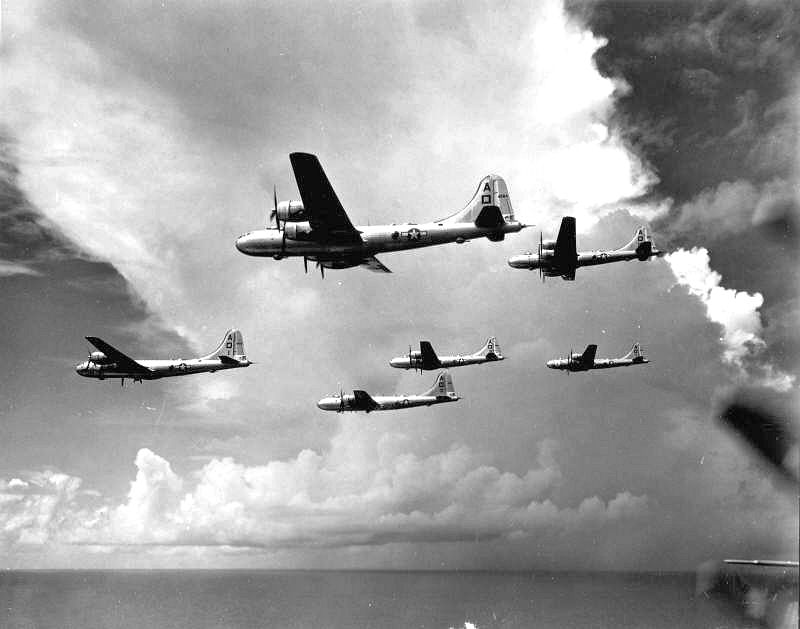
Formation of 497th Bombardment Group B-29s showing Square A tail marking

The 871st deployed to the Pacific Theater of Operations, with the ground echelon sailing 30 July on the SS Fairisle, passing through Honolulu and Eniwetok before arriving at Saipan on 20 September. Upon arrival the squadron's personnel were engaged in construction. By mid-October most personnel were able to move into Quonset huts from the tents which they were assigned on arrival. The aircrews began departing Kansas on 6 October, ferrying their aircraft to Saipan via a 6500 nautical mile route, with the last B-29 arriving on 30 October. At Saipan the unit became part of the XXI Bomber Command at Isely Field.

The squadron began operations on 28 October 1944 with a night attack against the submarine pens at Truk Islands and attacks against Iwo Jima in early November. The squadron took part in the first attack on Japan by AAF planes based in the Marianas. On 24 November 1944 110 aircraft of the 73rd Bombardment Wing bombed Tokyo on this mission. The 871st flew missions against strategic objectives in Japan, originally in daylight and from high altitude. It was also tasked with "Weather Strike" missions which were single ship flights flown nightly to obtain weather information for target areas in Japan while also making incendiary attacks on various targets.

The squadron received a Distinguished Unit Citation (DUC) for a mission on 27 January 1945. Although weather conditions prevented the group from bombing its primary objective, the unescorted B-29's withstood severe enemy attacks to strike an alternate target, the industrial area of Hamamatsu. It was awarded a second DUC for attacking strategic centers in Japan during July and August 1945. The squadron assisted the assault on Okinawa in April 1945 by bombing enemy airfields to cut down air attacks against the invasion force. Beginning on 19 March and continuing until the end of the war the squadron made incendiary raids against Japan, flying at night and at low altitude to bomb area targets. The unit released propaganda leaflets over the Japanese home islands, continuing strategic bombing raids and incendiary attacks until the Japanese surrender in August 1945.

=== Return to the United States and inactivation ===
After V-J Day, the 871st dropped supplies to Allied prisoners. In November 1945 the unit returned to the United States where it became part of Continental Air Forces at March Field, California. In January 1945, the 871st moved to MacDill Field, Florida. In March 1946 CAF became Strategic Air Command (SAC), and the squadron was one of SAC's first bombardment squadrons. Demobilization, however, was in full swing and the squadron turned in its aircraft and was inactivated on 31 March.

=== Expeditionary operations ===
In 2007 the squadron was converted to provisional status as the 871st Air Expeditionary Squadron and assigned to United States Air Forces Europe to activate or inactivate as needed. It was activated in 2008 at Accra, Ghana. The squadron was again activated in April 2015 at Keflavik International Airport for the Icelandic Air Surveillance and Policing mission. Iceland does not maintain its own military force, so the United States and other NATO allies periodically rotate through Keflavik to maintain the integrity and security of Iceland's airspace. the 2015 deployment included four McDonnell Douglas F-15C Eagle fighters from RAF Lakenheath, a Boeing KC-135 Stratotanker from RAF Mildenhall and approximately 200 airmen.

== Lineage ==
- Constituted as the 871st Bombardment Squadron, Very Heavy on 19 November 1943

Activated on 20 November 1943
Inactivated on 31 March 1946

- Converted to provisional status and redesignated 871st Air Expeditionary Squadron on 2 July 2007

Activated on 30 January 2008
Inactivated on 4 March 2008
Activated c. 17 April 2015
Inactivated Unknown

=== Assignments ===
- 497th Bombardment Group: 20 November 1943 – 31 March 1946
- United States Air Forces Europe to activate or inactivate as required: 2 July 2007

409th Air Expeditionary Group: 30 January 2008 – 4 March 2008
Attached to 48th Fighter Wing, c.17 April 2015 – unknown

=== Stations ===
- El Paso Army Air Base, Texas, 20 November 1943
- Clovis Army Air Field, New Mexico, 1 December 1943
- Pratt Army Airfield, Kansas, 13 April 1944 – 17 July 1944
- Isely Field, Saipan, 17 September 1944 – 1 November 1945
- Camp Stoneman, California, 14 November 1945
- March Field, California, c. 26 November 1945
- MacDill Field, Florida, c. 5 January 1946 – 31 March 1946
- Accra, Ghana, 30 January 2008 -4 March 2008
- Keflavik International Airport, Iceland, c.17 April 2015 – unknown

=== Aircraft ===
- Boeing B-17 Flying Fortress, 1944
- Boeing B-29 Superfortress, 1944-1946
- McDonnell Douglas F-15 Eagle, 2015
- Boeing KC-135 Stratotanker, 2015

=== Awards and campaigns ===
Award streamer	Award	Dates	Notes
	Distinguished Unit Citation	27 January 1945	Japan 871st Bombardment Squadron
	Distinguished Unit Citation	26 July 1945 – 2 August 1945	Japan 871st Bombardment Squadron

Campaign Streamer	Campaign	Dates	Notes
	Air Offensive, Japan	17 September 1944 – 2 September 1945	871st Bombardment Squadron
	Eastern Mandates	17 September 1944 – 14 April 1944	871st Bombardment Squadron
	Western Pacific	17 April 1945 – 2 September 1945	871st Bombardment Squadron
