= List of United States Air Force electronic warfare squadrons =

The mission of a United States Air Force electronic warfare squadron is to use the electromagnetic spectrum (EM spectrum) to attack an enemy, or impede enemy actions by denying the use of the EM spectrum, whilst ensuring friendly forces free access to it. Electronic warfare can target humans, communication, radar, or other assets (military and civilian). This list contains squadrons inactive, active, and historical.

== List ==
Squadron	Location	Nickname	Note
16th Electronic Warfare Squadron	Eglin AFB, FL		
17th Electronic Warfare Squadron	Robins AFB		
23d Electronic Warfare Squadron	Eglin AFB, FL		
36th Electronic Warfare Squadron	Eglin AFB, FL		
39th Electronic Warfare Squadron	Eglin AFB, FL		
41st Electronic Combat Squadron	Davis–Monthan AFB		
42d Electronic Combat Squadron	RAF Upper Heyford UK		EF-111A
43d Electronic Combat Squadron	Davis–Monthan AFB		
68th Electronic Warfare Squadron	Eglin AFB, FL		
81st Electronic Warfare Squadron	Robins AFB, GA		
87th Electronic Warfare Squadron	Eglin AFB, FL		
169th Electronic Warfare Squadron	McEntire JNGB, Columbia, SC		
388th Electronic Warfare Squadron	Eglin AFB, FL		
390th Electronic Combat Squadron	Mountain Home AFB, ID		EA-18G
360th Tactical Electronic Warfare Squadron	Tan Son Nhut Air Base, South Vietnam	Antique Airlines	EC-47
361st Tactical Electronic Warfare Squadron	Tan Son Nhut Air Base, South Vietnam		EC-47
362d Tactical Electronic Warfare Squadron	Tan Son Nhut Air Base, South Vietnam		EC-47
453d Electronic Warfare Squadron	Lackland AFB, TX		
501st Electronic Warfare Squadron	Robins AFB, GA		
513th Electronic Warfare Squadron	Eglin AFB, FL		
563d Eectronic Warfare Squadron	Eglin AFB, FL		

== See also ==
- List of United States Air Force squadrons
- List of United States Air Force electronic combat squadrons
