= Pratt Regional Airport =

Pratt Regional Airport former Pratt AAF
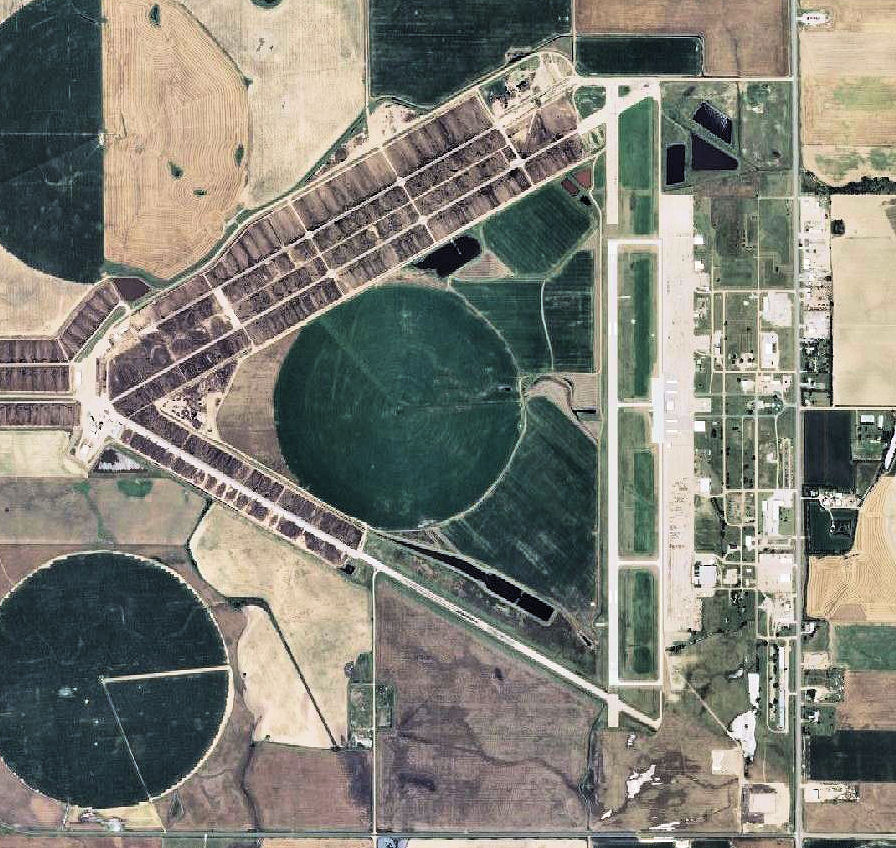
- 2008 USGS photo
- IATA: PTT; ICAO: KPTT; FAA LID: PTT

Summary
- Airport type: Public
- Owner: Pratt Airport Authority
- Serves: Pratt, Kansas
- Elevation AMSL: 1,953 ft / 595 m
- Coordinates: 37°42′09″N 098°44′49″W
- Website: www.PrattAirportAuthority.com
- Interactive map of Pratt Regional Airport

Runways
Direction	Length		Surface
Direction	ft	m	Surface
17/35	5,500	1,676	Concrete

Statistics (2008)
- Aircraft operations: 11,450
- Based aircraft: 25
- Source: Federal Aviation Administration

Pratt Regional Airport (IATA: PTT, ICAO: KPTT, FAA LID: PTT) is a public airport five miles north of Pratt, in Pratt County, Kansas. Previously known as Pratt Industrial Airport, it is on the site of the former Pratt Army Airfield.

== Facilities ==
Pratt Regional Airport covers 2,569 acres (1,040 ha) at an elevation of 1,953 feet (595 m). Its one runway, 17/35, is 5,500 by 100 feet (1,676 x 30 m). The facility had three 8,000 feet (2,400 m) runways: 13/31 (now closed), 04/22 (also closed), and runway 17/35 that has since been shortened by 2500 feet.

In the year ending August 13, 2008 the airport had 11,450 aircraft operations, average 31 per day: 96% general aviation, 3% air taxi, and 1% military. 25 aircraft were then based at this airport: 68% single-engine and 32% multi-engine.

== See also ==
- List of airports in Kansas
