= KPTT Agricultural Training Center =

Jesuit-run organic farming school in Salatiga

Coordinates: 7°20′12.59″S 110°29′55.62″E

KPTT Agricultural Training Center Kursus Pertanian Taman Tani
- Abbreviation: KPTT
- Established: 1965; 61 years ago
- Type: Training in organic agriculture
- Location(s): Jl. Mayang Sari No.2; Salatiga, Indonesia
- Director: Wartaya Winangun
- Affiliations: Jesuit, Catholic

KPTT Agricultural Training Center (Kursus Pertanian Taman Tani) is a Jesuit-run boarding and day school that teaches organic farming. It was founded in 1965 in Salatiga, Central Java, Indonesia.

== See also ==
- List of Jesuit sites
