= 513th Electronic Warfare Squadron =

513th Electronic Warfare Squadron

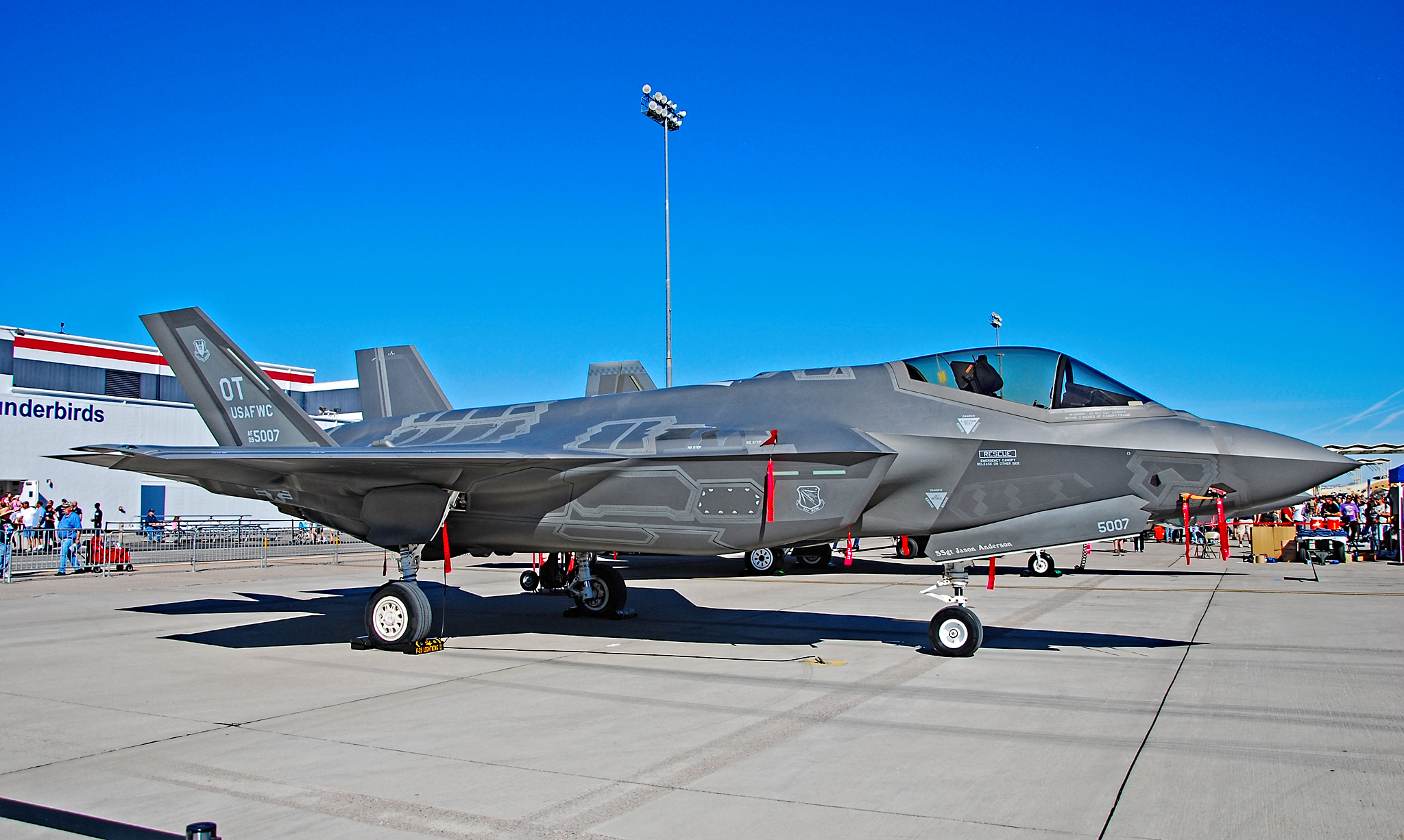
- 53d Wing F-35A Lightning II at Nellis AFB
- Active: 1942–1965; 1986–1997; 2010–present
- Country: United States
- Branch: United States Air Force
- Role: Electronic Warfare
- Part of: Air Combat Command
- Garrison/HQ: Eglin Air Force Base
- Engagements: Mediterranean Theater of Operations
- Decorations: Distinguished Unit Citation; Air Force Outstanding Unit Award; Air Force Organizational Excellence Award

Insignia
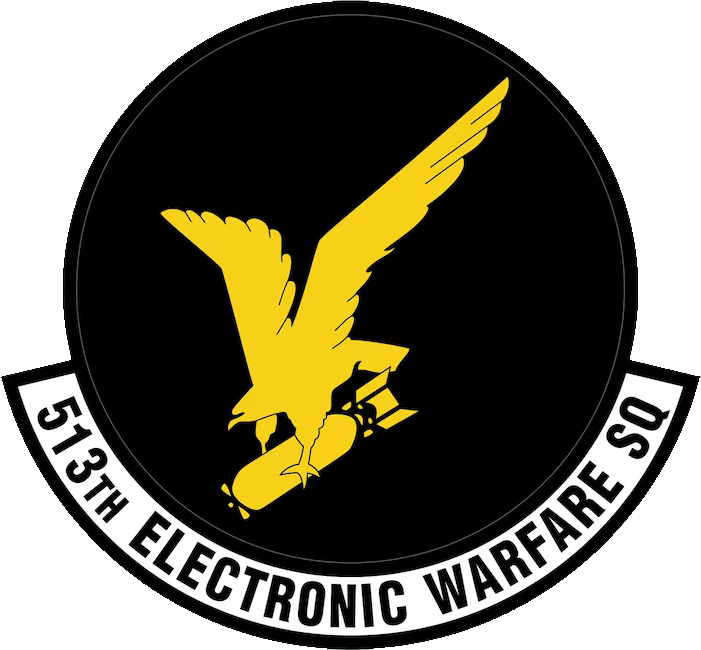
- 513th Electronic Warfare Squadron emblem (Note: Approved 12 July 1994.)

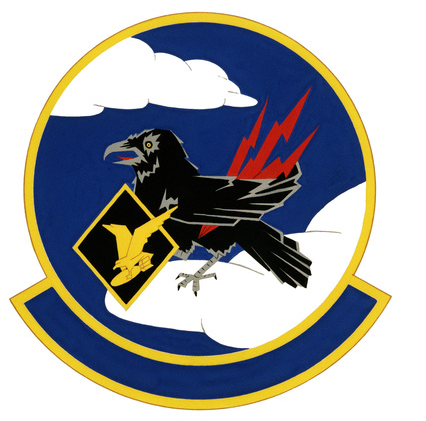
- 513th Test Squadron emblem (Note: Approved 1989.)

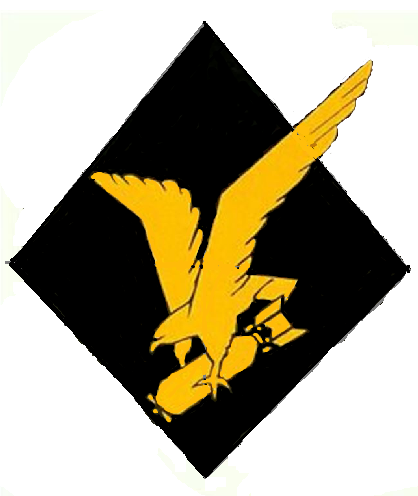
- 513th Bombardment Squadron emblem (Note: Approved 6 January 1944. Description: Over and through a black diamond, point to base, a gold stylized falcon riding an aerial bomb of the last [color mentioned] toward dexter base.)

The 513th Electronic Warfare Squadron is a United States Air Force unit assigned to the 350th Spectrum Warfare Wing at Eglin Air Force Base, Florida.

The squadron was formed as the 513th Bombardment Squadron in the Middle East in 1942 to reinforce the Royal Air Force in North Africa with personnel and aircraft diverted from delivery to the China Burma India Theater. The squadron moved forward, eventually being stationed in Italy, where it participated in the strategic bombing campaign against Germany, and was awarded three Distinguished Unit Citations for its combat actions. Following V-E Day, the squadron returned to the United States, where it converted to Boeing B-29 Superfortress bombers, but was inactivated in March 1946.

The squadron was redesignated the 513th Reconnaissance Squadron and activated in 1947 as a weather reconnaissance unit. Except for a brief period of inactivation in the winter of 1948–1949, it continued the reconnaissance mission until February 1951, when it was inactivated and its assets transferred to another squadron.

The squadron returned to the bombardment mission later that year, and upgraded to jet Boeing B-47 Stratojet bombers in 1954. It continued to fly the Stratojet until they were phased out of the Air Force inventory, and the squadron was inactivated in 1965. It was redesignated the 513th Test Squadron and activated in 1986, serving in that role until inactivating in 1997. It was activated in its most recent role in 2010.

== Mission ==
The role of the squadron is to provide combat-credible mission data to the Lockheed Martin F-35 Lightning II fighters, relying on expertise in intelligence analysis, mission data programming, and software development. It also operates a Hardware-in-the-loop test line for verification and validation testing of data. The 513th provides mission data to all United States Air Force, United States Navy, and United States Marine Corps Lightning II aircraft.

== History ==
=== World War II ===
==== Background ====
In early 1942, the Afrika Corps was threatening British forces in Egypt. In response, two contingents of American heavy bombers were diverted to support the British. A flight of Consolidated B-24 Liberators being ferried to India was halted from its travel in June and some Boeing B-17 Flying Fortresses from the 9th and 436th Bombardment Squadrons were flown to the Middle East from India. On 20 July 1942, these elements were organized into the 1st Provisional Group at RAF Lydda, Palestine.

==== North African operations ====
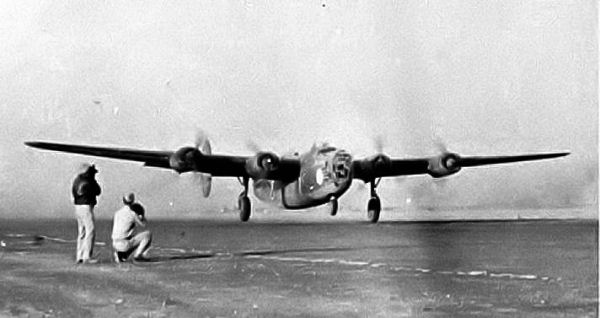
376th Group B-24 Liberator taking off from a Libyan base

On 31 October 1942, the 1st Group was dissolved and replaced by a formal Army Air Forces unit, the 376th Bombardment Group. The 513th Bombardment Squadron was activated as one of its four component squadrons. The squadron was originally equipped with a mix of Liberators and Flying Fortresses, but by the end of the year, the B-17s were transferred to Twelfth Air Force and the squadron became an all B-24 unit.

Moving forward to bases in Egypt and Libya, the squadron attacked shipping in the Mediterranean and harbor installations in Libya, Tunisia, Sicily, and Italy to cut enemy supply lines to North Africa. After the fall of Tunisia in May 1943, the squadron focused on attacks on aerodromes, marshalling yards, and other objectives in Sicily and Italy, moving forward to Enfidaville Airfield, Tunisia in late September. Its actions during these attacks on enemy targets from its activation through August 1943 earned the squadron its first Distinguished Unit Citation (DUC).

On 1 August 1943, operating from Benina Airport, Libya, the squadron participated in Operation Tidal Wave, the low level attack on oil refineries near Ploesti, with the squadron's parent group leading the attack formation. As it approached its assigned targets, the lead aircraft realized that an order from the group commander, who had misidentified the initial point, put the group off course. The group attempted an attack on the Romana Americana refinery, its assigned objective from a different direction. By this time, enemy air defenses had been alerted and intense flak forced the unit to attack targets of opportunity. The squadron was awarded its second DUC for this operation.

==== Strategic bombing campaign ====
The squadron moved to San Pancrazio Airfield, Italy in November 1943, where it became part of Fifteenth Air Force and would remain until April 1945. It primarily flew long range strategic bombardment missions to targets in Italy, France, Germany, Czechoslovakia, Austria, Hungary, and the Balkans to bomb factories, marshalling yards, oil refineries, oil storage facilities, airdromes, bridges, harbors, and other objectives. On 16 June 1944, it received a third DUC for an attack on oil industry targets in Bratislava. The squadron also provided air support for Operation Shingle, the landings at Anzio and flew interdiction missions to support the Battle of Monte Cassino between February and March 1944. In the fall of 1944, it assisted the Red Army in its advance through the Balkans, and in early 1945, supported Operation Grapeshot, the spring offensive in Northern Italy. The squadron was withdrawn from combat in April 1945 and left Italy for the United States.

The squadron arrived at Harvard Army Air Field, Nebraska in May 1945 and began conversion to the Boeing B-29 Superfortress. However the war in the Pacific ended before the squadron was fully trained. After it moved to March Field, California on 1 November, the squadron was not fully manned or equipped. It was inactivated on 28 March 1946, and most of its few resources at MacDill Air Force Base, Florida were absorbed by the 498th Bombardment Group.

=== Weather reconnaissance ===
The squadron was redesignated the 513th Reconnaissance Squadron and activated at Gravelly Point, Virginia in May 1947. Although the squadron was reassigned to Air Weather Service in September, and to the 308th Reconnaissance Group in October, it was not manned before inactivating on 20 September 1948.

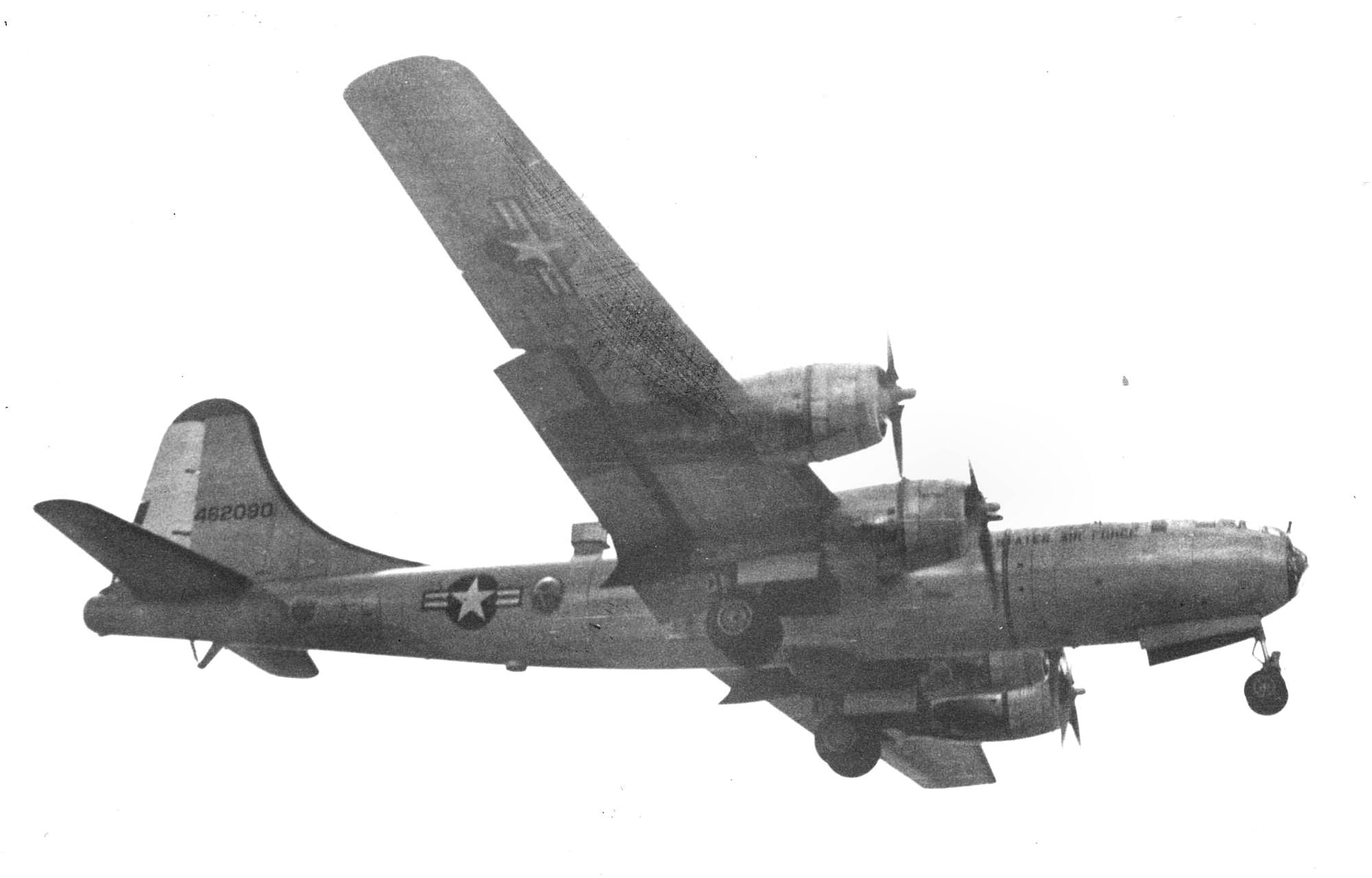
Boeing WB-29A

The squadron was reactivated at Fairfield-Suisun Air Force Base, California in August 1949. After drawing its cadre and training with the 2078th Weather Reconnaissance Squadron on various models of the Boeing B-29 Superfortress, the squadron moved to Tinker Air Force Base, Oklahoma in November. Air Weather Service reorganized its weather reconnaissance assets at this time, inactivating the 308th Reconnaissance Group, and the squadron was assigned directly to Air Weather Service headquarters. The squadron was inactivated in February 1951, as Air Weather Service again reorganized its reconnaissance units to focus on overseas operations.

=== Strategic Air Command ===
EB-47E Stratojet in 376th Wing markings

The squadron was redesignated the 513th Bombardment Squadron and reactivated at Forbes Air Force Base, Kansas in June 1951. The squadron was again equipped with Superfortress bombers and assigned to the 376th Group. It began training in strategic bombardment in August. However, SAC's mobilization for the Korean War highlighted that SAC wing commanders focused too much on running the base organization and did not spend enough time on overseeing actual combat preparations. To allow wing commanders the ability to focus on combat operations, SAC air base group commanders became responsible for managing the base housekeeping functions. Under the plan implemented in February 1951 and finalized in June 1952, the wing commander focused primarily on the combat units and the maintenance necessary to support combat aircraft by having the combat and maintenance squadrons report directly to the wing and eliminating the intermediate group structures. As a result of this "dual deputy" reorganization, the 376th Group was inactivated and the squadron was assigned directly to the 376th Bombardment Wing in June 1952.

The squadron moved to Barksdale Air Force Base, Louisiana in October. By November 1952, electronic countermeasures (ECM) training began to predominate over bombardment, and by September 1953, ECM had become the unit's primary mission. In 1954, the squadron converted to Boeing B-47 Stratojet jet medium bombers. It moved again in 1957, this time to Lockbourne Air Force Base, Ohio. After 1958, Strategic Air Command (SAC) B-47 units began to assume an alert posture at their home base.

During the 1962 Cuban Missile Crisis, SAC dispersed its B-47s on 22 October. Most dispersal bases were civilian airfields with Reserve or Air National Guard units. B-47s were configured for execution of the Emergency War Order as soon as possible after dispersal. On 24 October SAC went to DEFCON 2, placing all aircraft on alert. On 15 November 1/6 of the dispersed B-47s were recalled to their home bases. The remaining dispersed B-47s and supporting tankers were recalled on 24 November. On 27 November SAC returned to normal alert posture. The squadron continued to train in electronic warfare techniques until beginning to phase down for inactivation in March 1965 with the retirement of the Stratojet from SAC's inventory.

=== Operational test unit ===
The squadron was redesignated the 513th Test Squadron and activated at Offutt Air Force Base, Nebraska on 1 July 1986. The squadron conducted operational test and evaluation of Boeing B-52 Stratofortress, Rockwell B-1 Lancer, and Boeing KC-135 Stratotanker aircraft and support systems. When SAC was disestablished in June 1992, the squadron was transferred to the USAF Air Warfare Center, but continued its mission until inactivated in May 1997.

=== Electronic warfare for F-35 ===
The squadron was redesignated the 513th Electronic Warfare Squadron and activated at Eglin Air Force Base, Florida in April 2010 with an electronic warfare reprogramming mission.

== Lineage ==
- Constituted as the 513th Bombardment Squadron (Heavy) on 19 October 1942

Activated on 31 October 1942
Redesignated 513th Bombardment Squadron, Heavy on 3 May 1944
Redesignated 513th Bombardment Squadron, Very Heavy on 23 May 1945
Inactivated on 31 March 1946
Redesignated 513th Reconnaissance Squadron, Very Long Range, Weather on 6 May 1947
Activated on 23 May 1947
Inactivated on 20 September 1948
Activated on 10 August 1949
Inactivated on 20 February 1951
Redesignated 513th Bombardment Squadron, Medium on 25 May 1951
Activated on 1 June 1951
Discontinued and inactivated on 15 March 1965
Redesignated 513th Test Squadron on 12 February 1986
Activated on 1 July 1986
Redesignated 513th Engineering and Test Squadron on 15 April 1993
Inactivated on 31 May 1997
Redesignated 513th Electronic Warfare Squadron on 30 March 2010
Activated on 23 April 2010

=== Assignments ===
- 376th Bombardment Group, 31 October 1942
- 497th Bombardment Group, 1 November 1945 – 31 March 1946
- 376th Reconnaissance Group, 23 May 1947
- Air Weather Service, 26 September 1947
- 308th Reconnaissance Group, 14 October 1947 – 20 September 1948
- 308th Reconnaissance Group, 10 August 1949
- Air Weather Service, 19 December 1950 – 20 February 1951
- 376th Bombardment Group, 1 June 1951
- 376th Bombardment Wing, 16 June 1952 – 15 March 1965
- Strategic Air Command, 1 July 1986 – 1 June 1992 (attached to SAC Combat Operations Staff)
- USAF Air Warfare Center, 1 June 1992
- 68th Electronic Combat Group, 15 April 1993 – 31 May 1997
- 53d Electronic Warfare Group, 23 April 2010
- 350th Spectrum Warfare Group, 25 June 2021 – present

=== Stations ===
- RAF Lydda, Palestine, 31 October 1942
- RAF Abu Sueir, Egypt, 8 November 1942
- RAF Gambut, Libya, 10 February 1943
- Soluch Airfield, Libya, 25 February 1943
- Benina Airport, Libya, 16 April 1943
- Enfidaville Airfield, Tunisia, c. 26 September 1943

Detachment operated from Benina Airport, Libya, 3–11 October 1943

- San Pancrazio Airfield, Italy, 19 November 1943 – 19 April 1945
- Harvard Army Air Field, Nebraska, 8 May 1945
- Grand Island Army Air Field, Nebraska, 25 June 1945
- March Field, California, 1 November 1945
- MacDill Field, Florida c. 5 January–31 March 1946
- Gravelly Point, Virginia, 23 May 1947 – 20 September 1948
- Fairfield-Suisun Air Force Base, California, 10 August 1949
- Tinker Air Force Base, Oklahoma, 10 November 1949 – 20 February 1951

Detachment operated from Dhahran Airfield, Saudi Arabia, c. 6 March–May 1950

- Forbes Air Force Base, Kansas, 1 June 1951
- Barksdale Air Force Base, Louisiana, 10 October 1951
- Lockbourne Air Force Base, Ohio, 1 December 1957 – 15 March 1965
- Offutt Air Force Base, Nebraska, 1 July 1986 – 31 May 1997
- Eglin Air Force Base, Florida, 23 April 2010 – present

=== Aircraft ===
- Boeing B-17 Flying Fortress, 1942–1943
- Consolidated B-24 Liberator, 1943–1945
- Boeing B-29 Superfortress, 1945, 1951–1954, 1950–1951
- Boeing RB-29 Superfortress, 1950–1951
- Boeing WB-29 Superfortress, 1950–1951
- Douglas C-47 Skytrain, 1950
- Douglas C-54 Skymaster, 1950–1951
- Boeing B-47 Stratojet, 1954–1961
- Boeing EB-47 Stratojet, 1961–1965
- Boeing B-52 Stratofortress, 1992–1997
- Rockwell B-1 Lancer, 1992–1997
- Boeing KC-135 Stratotanker, 1992–1997

=== Awards and campaigns ===
Award streamer	Award	Dates	Notes
	Distinguished Unit Citation	November 1942-17 August 1943	North Africa and Sicily, 513th Bombardment Squadron
	Distinguished Unit Citation	1 August 1943	Ploesti, Romania, 513th Bombardment Squadron
	Distinguished Unit Citation	16 June 1944	Bratislava, Czechoslovakia, 513th Bombardment Squadron
	Air Force Outstanding Unit Award	1 July 1987-30 June 1989	513th Test Squadron
	Air Force Outstanding Unit Award	1 Dec 1994-30 Nov 1996	513th Engineering and Test Squadron
	Air Force Organizational Excellence Award	1 January 1992-31 December 1993	513th Engineering and Test Squadron

Campaign Streamer	Campaign	Dates	Notes
	Air Offensive, Europe	31 October 1942 – 5 June 1944	513th Bombardment Squadron
	Air Combat, EAME Theater	31 October 1942 – 11 May 1945	513th Bombardment Squadron
	Egypt-Libya	31 October 1942 – 12 February 1943	513th Bombardment Squadron
	Tunisia	12 November 1942 – 13 May 1943	513th Bombardment Squadron
	Sicily	14 May 1943 – 17 August 1943	513th Bombardment Squadron
	Naples-Foggia	18 August 1943 – 21 January 1944	513th Bombardment Squadron
	Anzio	22 January 1944 – 24 May 1944	513th Bombardment Squadron
	Rome-Arno	22 January 1944 – 9 September 1944	513th Bombardment Squadron
	Central Europe	22 March 1944 – 18 April 1945	513th Bombardment Squadron
	Normandy	6 June 1944 – 24 July 1944	513th Bombardment Squadron
	Northern France	25 July 1944 – 14 September 1944	513th Bombardment Squadron
	Southern France	15 August 1944 – 14 September 1944	513th Bombardment Squadron
	North Apennines	10 September 1944 – 4 April 1945	513th Bombardment Squadron
	Rhineland	15 September 1944 – 21 March 1945	513th Bombardment Squadron
	Po Valley	3 April 1945 – 18 April 1945	513th Bombardment Squadron

== See also ==
- List of United States Air Force electronic warfare squadrons
- List of United States Air Force test squadrons
- List of B-1 units of the United States Air Force
- List of B-52 Units of the United States Air Force
- List of B-47 units of the United States Air Force
- List of B-29 Superfortress operators
- List of Douglas C-47 Skytrain operators
- Boeing B-17 Flying Fortress Units of the Mediterranean Theater of Operations
- B-24 Liberator units of the United States Army Air Forces
