= Pratt Army Air Field =

Retired air base

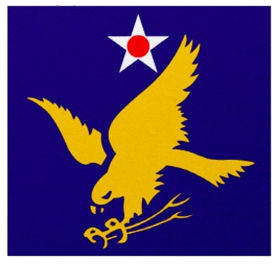
Pratt Army Air Field
- Part of Second Air Force
- Located Near: Pratt, Kansas
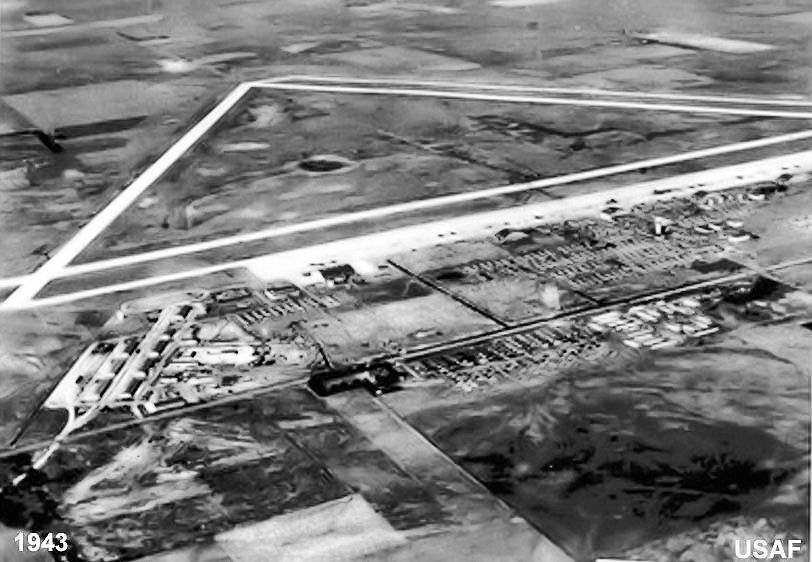
- Pratt Army Air Field 1943

Location
- Location within Kansas
- Coordinates: 37°42′18″N 098°45′15″W

Site history
- Built: 1942
- In use: 1942-1945

Pratt Army Air Field is a closed United States Army Air Forces base. It is located 4 miles (6.4 km) north-northwest of Pratt, Kansas, and was closed in 1946. Today it is used as Pratt Regional Airport. While part of the runways from the original base are used as roads for the pratt feedlot.

Pratt Army Air Field (AAF) is significantly historic as it was the first United States Army Air Forces B-29 Superfortress station, receiving the prototype YB-29 bomber in the summer of 1943. Along with Walker Army Air Field near Victoria, Great Bend Army Air Field near Great Bend and Smoky Hill Army Air Field near Salina, the initial cadre of the 58th Bombardment Wing was formed. The 58th Bomb Wing was the first B-29 combat wing of World War II and engaged in the first long-range strategic bombardment of the Japanese Home Islands beginning in March 1944 from bases in India.

== History ==
Construction of Pratt Army Air Field was begun in September 1942. The field is located about three miles north of the city of Pratt, a community of about 7,000, which was the only urban area readily accessible to personnel of the field. The area of the field sloped slightly from west to east, with an elevation varying from 1,969 feet to 1,930 feet.

Eventually, Pratt AAF would have three 8,000-foot-long main runways and five hangars. Station construction was of the theater of operations type. By the time of the official dedication of the field in May 1943, some 60 barracks had been completed, giving accommodations to 2,460 enlisted men. Total authorized construction called for 72 barracks with a capacity of 3,060 enlisted men and eight officers' quarters with a housing capacity of 522.

A few personnel began to arrive well before completion of the field. The first group, a 12-man Engineer cadre on detached service, stayed for a time at the Calbeck Hotel in Pratt until facilities at the field had been completed sufficiently for them to move in. The first building on the airfield was the engineer's building, and from there, the construction of the base would be directed. Site preparation grading started in October, and during the time the airfield was under construction, the announcement was made that the original design would be expanded to accommodate B-29 training.

In January 1943, the 502d Base Headquarters and Air Base Squadron was activated to function as the administrative and training squadron for the other organizations which would be assigned to the base. On 10 February 1943, Lt. Col. J.F. Nelson assumed command of the field, and by March the installation began to function as a military post with the barest of essentials in housing, messing, and administrative equipment. Construction and personnel manning had progressed so far by May that on the second of the month the field was officially dedicated.

Originally, Pratt Army Air Field had been scheduled to function as one of several bases under the control of the 21st Bombardment Wing. It was the task of this latter organization to process for overseas duty, especially as to equipment, the bombardment wings formed and trained under the Second Air Force. However, to the disappointment of the 21st Wing, which, incidentally, was continually plagued by lack of facilities with which to operate, Pratt never really came under its program. The enormous effort necessary to form and train the B-29 groups diverted Pratt from its original mission with the 21st to one of the several fields dedicated to the special B-29 combat training program.

=== Initial B-29 challenges ===
The training of the B-29 groups at the airfield and the other initial B-29 bases in Kansas was challenging and filled with problems, with the major cause being the B-29 itself. The Superfortress was a revolutionary new aircraft, the most sophisticated ever produced, and it was rushed into production due to the urgent need to get the aircraft into combat as quickly as possible. As a result, everything connected with the B-29 and the crews that would fly it was done at breakneck speed. The first aircraft arriving from Boeing were simply not fit for combat. The engines tended to overheat and catch fire. There was a lack of trained personnel to teach the newly organized airmen and no training aids available.

The first B-29 aircraft (a YB-29 prototype) arrived at Pratt in August 1943. When it arrived, it was considered "top secret" and placed under guard in a hangar, with a special pass required to get near it. Initially, the only people allowed near the aircraft were technicians from Boeing, working 24/7 to correct electrical and mechanical problems. From time to time, the plane was flown for an hour or so, then returned to the hangar for modifications by the Boeing technicians. During the late summer and fall of 1943, a few more B-29s arrived at Pratt, but actual aircrew training time on them was severely limited. Also, there were no tools or maintenance stands to work on the special fittings of the B-29 and all had to be manufactured locally from drawings provided by Boeing.

By early 1944, it became clear that there was much to do before the Superfortress was ready for combat. Most of the B-29s were still held up at the modification centers in Marietta, Georgia, and Birmingham, Alabama, making changes identified at Pratt and the other three bases in Kansas after they came off the production lines. These deficiencies were the result of flying the aircraft at the training fields and not having the time or luxury for proper development and testing at Boeing. It was more efficient to continue the production of the aircraft with the known issues and then fly it to the modification centers than it would be to try to make the changes on the production line.

By March 1944, the B-29 modification program had fallen into complete chaos, with absolutely no bombers being considered as combat-ready. Alarmed at the slow pace of bringing adequate numbers of Superfortress into service, General Hap Arnold, head of the Army Air Forces, directed that his assistant, Major General B. E. Meyer, personally take charge of the entire modification program. Most of the B-29s were still held up at the modification centers, awaiting conversion to full combat readiness. The program was seriously hampered by the need to work in the open air in inclement winter weather, by delays in acquiring the necessary tools and support equipment, and by the USAAF's general lack of experience with the B-29.

Commitments had been made to get the B-29 into combat by June 1944. The decision was made to focus more man and material at the four Kansas bases to prepare enough aircraft for combat in the China-Burma-India theater. The resulting burst of activity that took place between 10 March and 15 April 1944 came to be known as the "Battle of Kansas". Beginning in mid-March, technicians and specialists from the Wichita and Seattle factories were drafted into the modification centers from around the country to work around the clock to get the B-29s ready for combat. The mechanics often had to work outdoors in freezing weather, since the hangars were not large enough to accommodate the B-29s.

During this time, the B-29 crews were being processed for combat duty, attending briefing sessions, getting their shots and saying goodbye. Gradually as a result of efforts on the part of all concerned, the necessary modifications were finished and 150 B-29s were handed over to the XX Bomber Command by 15 April 1944. Aircraft began to deploy to India and new aircraft from the modification centers began to arrive to equip and train new group, which would continue until the end of the war.

=== B-29 Superfortress training ===
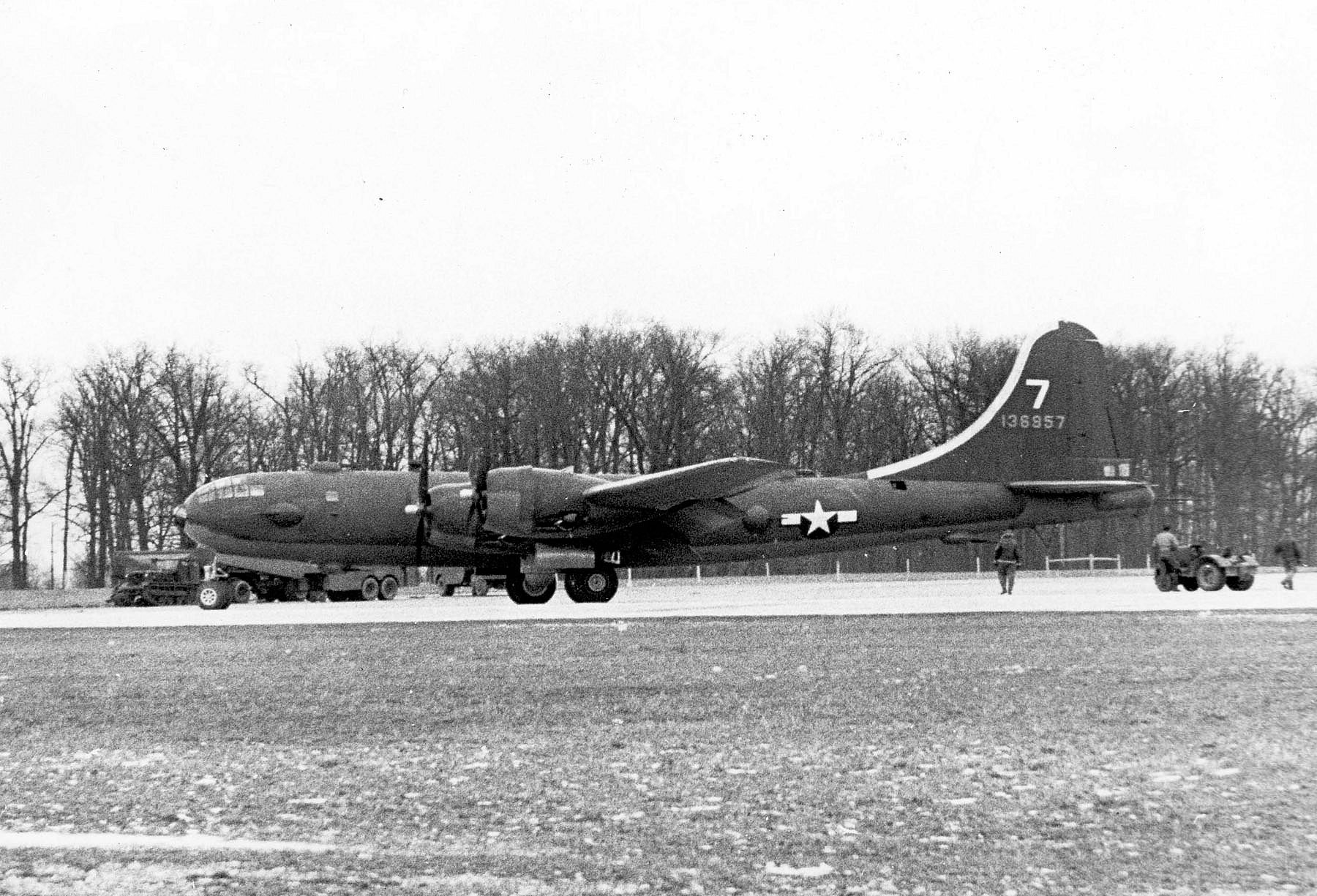
Boeing YB-29-BW Superfortress 41-36954 used for training

During 1943 and much of 1944, the newly formed B-29 bombardment groups conducted their own training at Pratt, with the field and its units serving only in an administrative, housekeeping, and general support capacity. This was true of both the 40th and 497th Bombardment Groups. Initially the newly formed groups conducted their own training, where the hundreds of men forming the bombardment group learned to function as a team. Individual training continued as necessary to polish skills, but the emphasis was on teamwork. Formation flying and long-range missions were practiced with the many other tasks necessary to build an effective fighting group. Due to the lack of training aircraft, many of the early gunners used modified B-24 Liberators and B-17 Flying Fortress aircraft which were substituted for training purposes.

As each group went into the latter phases of its training at Pratt, the next group in line to move to Pratt would send its maintenance squadrons ahead in order to acquire experience by assisting in aircraft maintenance for the older group. As a result, when the flight echelon of the new group arrived at Pratt upon departure of the previous group, the maintenance squadrons had acquired sufficient experience to enable them to keep their own group's aircraft in the air.

Early in 1944 a new base unit system was devised throughout the Air Force. At Pratt the 246th Army Air Force Base Unit, OTU (VH), was formed on 1 April 1944. Under the new dispensation, the responsibilities of the base were greatly increased, for in addition the base, through the 246th AAF Base Unit, was henceforth to be in charge of the training program of each succeeding B-29 group. For this purpose, a Directorate of Training was authorized. Such a great increase in function could not, of course, be accomplished immediately. Time was needed in which to acquire personnel sufficiently knowledgeable to supervise the instruction. Consequently, the 497th Bombardment Group trained itself just as the 40th Group had done before it. Indeed, it was not until August 1944, with the advent of the 29th Group, that the 246th AAF Base Unit was able to assume the task of group combat training. Under the same system the 29th Group was succeeded at Pratt by the 346th in January 1944, and 93d Group in July.

=== Inactivation ===
The process of closing down Pratt Army Air Field began in November 1945, while the 93d Group was still in training. The base unit suffered such serious losses of personnel during the month as to render its task of supervising the training of the 93d Group a most difficult one. With the departure of the 93d Group in December, the work of Pratt Army Air Field was done, and there remained only to complete the process of closing down the installation. Col. Reuben Kyle, Jr., as commanding officer, supervised the process.

Pratt Army Air Field was inactivated by Second Air Force on 31 December 1945. Sources are lacking by which to trace the subsequent steps leading to complete inactivation and transfer to the Army's District Engineer, Seventh Service Command at Omaha, Nebraska, who assumed jurisdiction over the field, pending disposition by March 1946. Excess buildings and demilitarized equipment were sold or transferred to other bases. Some were torn down and sales were held for scrap lumber of torn down buildings, fence posts, barbed wire and other items which no longer had a useful need.

== Current status ==
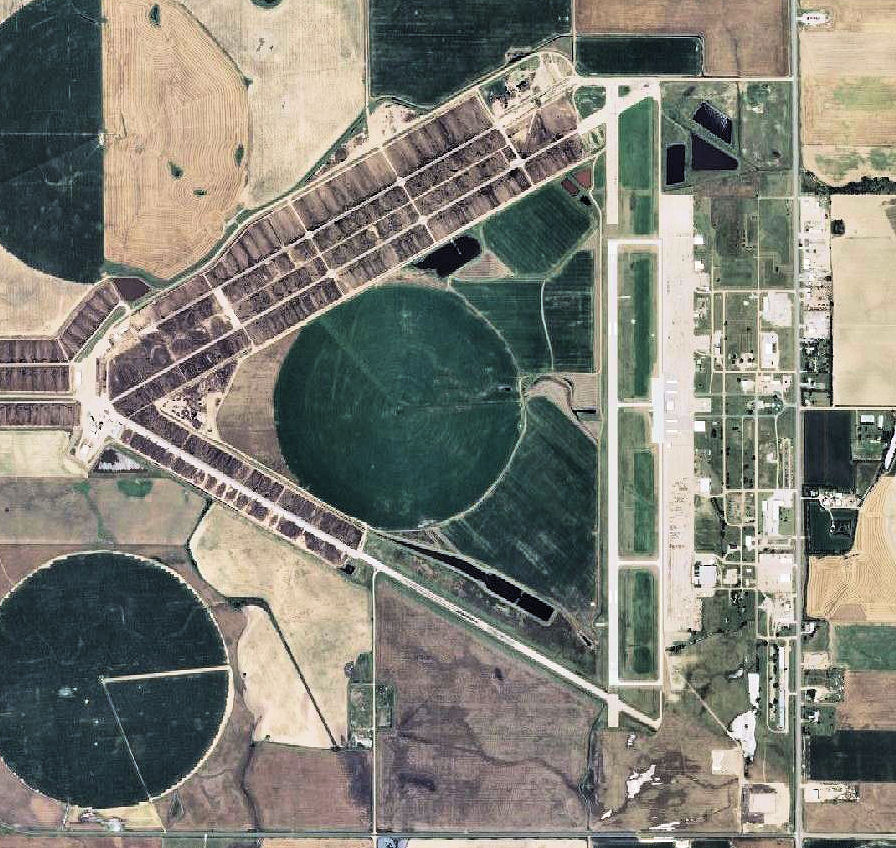
2006 Airphoto of the former Pratt Army Airfield

The War Assets Administration eventually turned the air base over to local government officials. The airfield was converted to civil use and is now known as Pratt Regional Airport. For a time, in the early 1950s, it hosted a component of McDonnell Aircraft and was used for testing of the XF-88 Voodoo, predecessor of the later F-101 Voodoo, using the much older McDonnell F2H Banshee as a chase plane.

Today, most of the airfield has returned to agricultural use, with a large area from the NE/SW runway becoming cattle feed pens. A large area was also converted of the NW/SE runway, both being reduced to single-lane concrete roadways. The civil airport runway 17/35 being a portion of the N/S military runway from Pratt AAF. The large aircraft parking apron remains, part of it being used as the terminal of Pratt Regional Airport and for aircraft parking space; much of it, however is used for non-aviation activities. Several wartime hangars remain standing and are in use for various activities.

The station area has been redeveloped into Pratt Airport Industrial Park. It has become a full-service, 200-acre platted park with buildings and sites available in an enterprise zone. The park is managed by the Pratt Airport Authority. Outlines of wartime structures removed from the site are visible in aerial photography in otherwise grassy areas. Many streets remain in-use along with the outline of the base parade ground and headquarters.

Among new improvement projects, a new 4500' crosswind runway with an artificial turf surface is being considered for the airport, with anticipated completion around 2020.

The former wartime airfield can be reached by traveling north on U.S. Route 281 from Pratt. The B-29 All Veterans Memorial at the airport was dedicated on Memorial Day weekend, 2003. The memorial honors all veterans, prisoners of war, and the missing in action from all conflicts.

== B-29 Units Trained At Pratt AAF ==
- 29th Bombardment Group (August - December 1944)
- 40th Bombardment Group (July 1943 - March 1944)
- 93d Bombardment Group (July - December 1945)
- 346th Bombardment Group (January - June 1945)
- 497th Bombardment Group (April - July 1944)

== See also ==
- Kansas World War II Army Airfields
- B-29 Superfortress Development
  - Great Bend Army Air Field
  - Smoky Hill Army Air Field
  - Walker Army Air Field
