= List of Boeing B-29 Superfortress operators =

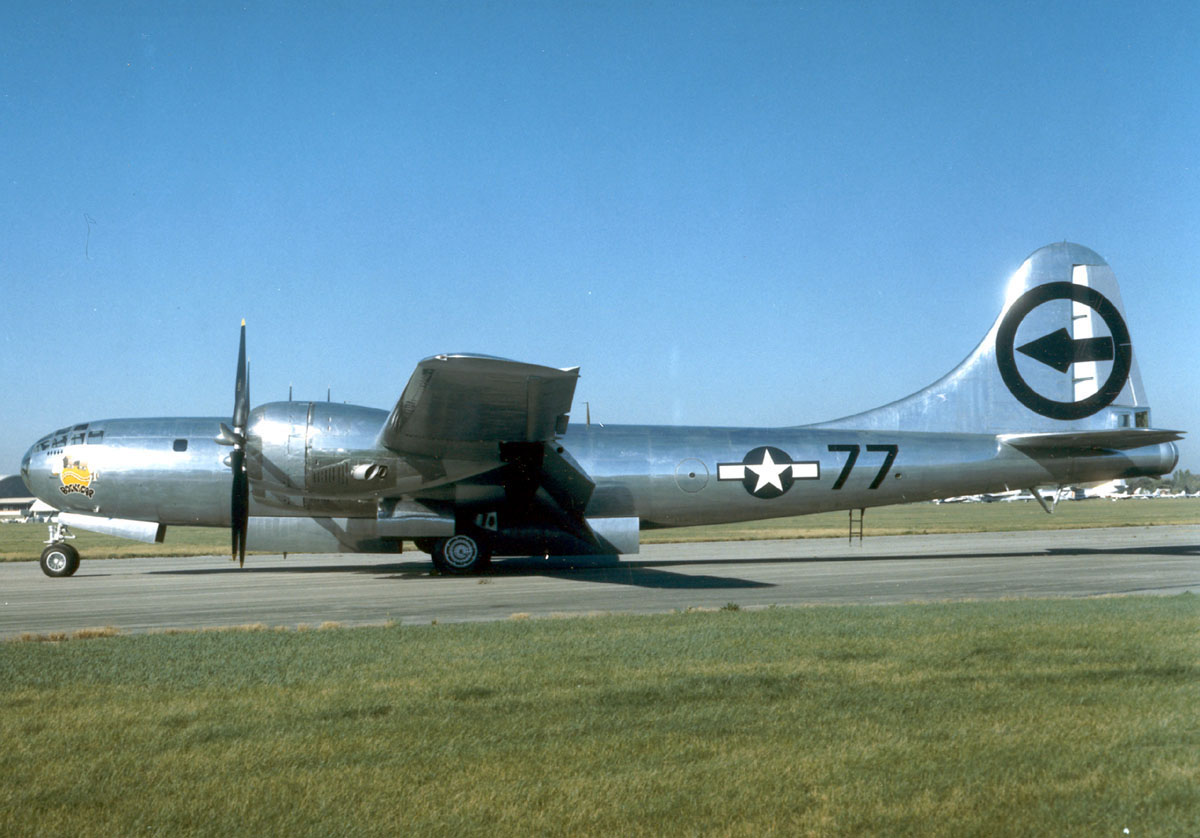
Martin-Omaha B-29-35-MO Superfortress 44-27297 "Bockscar"

This is a list of Boeing B-29 Superfortress units consisting of nations, their air forces, and the unit assignments that used the B-29 during World War II, Korean War, and post war periods, including variants and other historical information

Delivery of the first YB-29 test aircraft (YB-29-BW 41-36954) to the USAAF was made in June 1943, being delivered to the 58th Bombardment Wing, 40th Bombardment Group. The first production B-29s began to roll off the production lines at Boeing-Wichita in September 1943, also going to the 58th BW.

The last B-29 was delivered by Boeing-Wichita (B-29-100-BW, 45-21872) in September 1945. 21872 was converted to a WB-29; being destroyed in a crash on 25 September 1953 near Eielson AFB, Alaska, when assigned to the 58th Strategic Reconnaissance Squadron (Medium), Weather.

== United States ==
=== United States Army Air Forces ===
==== Combat Groups ====
Army Air Forces B-29 groups and squadrons assigned to operations as part of the Pacific War against the Japanese Empire, 1944–1945. Includes units assigned to the XX Bomber Command in the China-Burma-India Theater (April 1944 – February 1945), and to XXI Bomber Command in the Pacific Theater of Operations (PTO) (March–August 1945). Also includes groups and squadrons deployed to Okinawa assigned to Eighth Air Force, in July/August 1945 but did not engage in combat operations.

- 6th Bombardment Group, (B-29, B-29A, 1944–1947)

Reassigned from Sixth Air Force (ATO)
Redesignated Very Heavy BG, March 1944
XXI BC; 313th Bombardment Wing
Circle R Tail Code; North Field, Tinian
24th Bombardment Squadron
39th Bombardment Squadron
40th Bombardment Squadron
Inactivated in October 1948

- 9th Bombardment Group, (B-29, B-29A, 1944–1947)

Reassigned from Sixth Air Force (ATO)
Redesignated Very Heavy BG, March 1944
XXI BC; 313th Bombardment Wing
Circle X Tail Code; North Field, Tinian
1st Bombardment Squadron
5th Bombardment Squadron
99th Bombardment Squadron
Inactivated in October 1948

- 16th Bombardment Group, (B-29B, 1944–1946)

Activated, April 1944
XXI BC; 315th Bombardment Wing
Diamond B Tail Code; Northwest Field, Guam
15th Bombardment Squadron
16th Bombardment Squadron
17th Bombardment Squadron
Inactivated in April 1946

- 19th Bombardment Group, (B-29, B-29A, 1944–1954)

Reassigned from Fifth Air Force (SWPA)
Redesignated Very Heavy BG, April 1944
XXI BC; 314th Bombardment Wing
Square M Tail Code; North Field, Guam
28th Bombardment Squadron
30th Bombardment Squadron
93d Bombardment Squadron
Reassigned to: Twentieth Air Force (FEAF), May 1946
Reassigned to: 19th Bombardment Wing (FEAF), August 1948
Moved to: Andersen AFB, Guam, August 1948
Moved to: Kadena AB, Okinawa, June 1950
Combat in Korean War, 1950–1953
Reassigned to: Strategic Air Command in June 1954

- 29th Bombardment Group, (B-29, B-29A, 1944–1946)

Reassigned from II Bomber Command (ZI)
Redesignated Very Heavy BG, April 1944
XXI BC; 314th Bombardment Wing
Square O Tail Code; North Field, Guam
6th Bombardment Squadron
43d Bombardment Squadron
52d Bombardment Squadron
Inactivated in May 1946

- 39th Bombardment Group, (B-29, B-29A, 1944–1945)

Reassigned from II Bomber Command (ZI)
Redesignated Very Heavy BG, April 1944
XXI BC; 314th Bombardment Wing
Square P Tail Code; North Field, Guam
60th Bombardment Squadron
61st Bombardment Squadron
62d Bombardment Squadron
Inactivated in December 1945

- 40th Bombardment Group, (B-29, B-29A, 1943–1946)

Reassigned from Sixth Air Force (ATO)
Redesignated Very Heavy BG, November 1943
Redesignated Very Heavy BG, April 1944
XX BC; XXI BC; 58th Bombardment Wing
Chakulia, India, Hsingching, China (XX BC); West Field, Tinian (XXI BC)
Triangle S Tail Code
25th Bombardment Squadron
44th Bombardment Squadron
45th Bombardment Squadron
Inactivated in October 1946

- 330th Bombardment Group (VH), (B-29, B-29A, 1944–1945)

Reassigned from II Bomber Command (ZI)
Redesignated Very Heavy BG, April 1944
XXI BC; 314th Bombardment Wing
Square K Tail Code; North Field, Guam
457th Bombardment Squadron
458th Bombardment Squadron
459th Bombardment Squadron
Inactivated in November 1945

- 331st Bombardment Group, (B-29B, 1944–1946)

Reassigned from II Bomber Command (ZI)
Redesignated Very Heavy BG, July 1944
XXI BC; 315th Bombardment Wing
Diamond L Tail Code; Northwest Field, Guam
355th Bombardment Squadron
356th Bombardment Squadron
357th Bombardment Squadron
Inactivated in April 1946

- 333d Bombardment Group, (B-29, 1944–1946)

Reassigned from II Bomber Command (ZI)
Redesignated Very Heavy BG, July 1944
Eighth Air Force; 316th Bombardment Wing
Kadena Field, Okinawa
435th Bombardment Squadron
460th Bombardment Squadron
507th Bombardment Squadron
Inactivated in May 1946

- 346th Bombardment Group, (B-29, 1944–1946)

Reassigned from II Bomber Command (ZI)
Redesignated Very Heavy BG, August 1944
Eighth Air Force; 316th Bombardment Wing
Kadena Field, Okinawa
461st Bombardment Squadron
462d Bombardment Squadron
463d Bombardment Squadron
Inactivated in June 1946

- 382d Bombardment Group, (B-29, 1944–1946)

Reassigned from II Bomber Command (ZI)
Redesignated Very Heavy BG, August 1944
Eighth Air Force; 316th Bombardment Wing
Kadena Field, Okinawa
420th Bombardment Squadron
464th Bombardment Squadron
872d Bombardment Squadron
Inactivated in January 1946

- 383d Bombardment Group, (B-29, 1944–1946)

Reassigned from II Bomber Command (ZI)
Redesignated Very Heavy BG, August 1944
Eighth Air Force; 316th Bombardment Wing
Kadena Field, Okinawa
876th Bombardment Squadron
880th Bombardment Squadron
884th Bombardment Squadron
Inactivated in January 1946

- 444th Bombardment Group, (B-29, 1944–1946)

Reassigned from II Bomber Command (ZI)
Redesignated Very Heavy BG, August 1944
XX BC; XXI BC; 58th Bombardment Wing
Dudkhuadi, India, Kwanghan, China (XX BC); West Field, Tinian (XXI BC)
Triangle N Tail Code
676th Bombardment Squadron
677th Bombardment Squadron
678th Bombardment Squadron
679th Bombardment Squadron (1943–1944)
Inactivated in August 1946

- 462d Bombardment Group, (B-29, B-29A, 1943–1946)

Activated, July 1943
Redesignated Very Heavy BG, November 1943
XX BC; XXI BC; 58th Bombardment Wing
Piardpba, India, Kiunglai, China (XX BC); West Field, Tinian (XXI BC)
Triangle U Tail Code
768th Bombardment Squadron
769th Bombardment Squadron
770th Bombardment Squadron
771st Bombardment Squadron (1943–1944)
Inactivated in March 1946

- 468th Bombardment Group, (B-29, B-29A, 1943–1946)

Activated, August 1943
Redesignated Very Heavy BG, November 1943
XX BC; XXI BC; 58th Bombardment Wing
Kharagpur, India, Pengshan, China (XX BC); West Field, Tinian (XXI BC)
Triangle I Tail Code
792d Bombardment Squadron
793d Bombardment Squadron
794th Bombardment Squadron
795th Bombardment Squadron (1943–1944)
Inactivated in March 1946

- 497th Bombardment Group, (B-29, B-29A, 1943–1946)

Activated, November 1943
XXI BC; 73rd Bombardment Wing
A Square Tail Code; Isley Field, Saipan
869th Bombardment Squadron
870th Bombardment Squadron
871st Bombardment Squadron
Inactivated in March 1946

- 498th Bombardment Group, (B-29, B-29A, 1943–1946)

Activated, November 1943
XXI BC; 73rd Bombardment Wing
T Square Tail Code; Isley Field, Saipan
873d Bombardment Squadron
874th Bombardment Squadron
875th Bombardment Squadron
Inactivated in August 1946

- 499th Bombardment Group, (B-29, 1943–1946)

Activated, November 1943
XXI BC; 73rd Bombardment Wing
V Square Tail Code; Isley Field, Saipan
877th Bombardment Squadron
878th Bombardment Squadron
879th Bombardment Squadron
Inactivated in February 1946

- 500th Bombardment Group, (B-29, B-29A, 1943–1946)

Activated, November 1943
XXI BC; 73rd Bombardment Wing
Z Square Tail Code; Isley Field, Saipan
881st Bombardment Squadron
882d Bombardment Squadron
883d Bombardment Squadron
Inactivated in January 1946

- 501st Bombardment Group, (B-29B, 1944–1946)

Activated, May 1944
XXI BC; 315th Bombardment Wing
Diamond Y Tail Code; Northwest Field, Guam
21st Bombardment Squadron
41st Bombardment Squadron
485th Bombardment Squadron
Inactivated in June 1946

- 502d Bombardment Group, (B-29B, 1944–1946)

Activated, May 1944
XXI BC; 315th Bombardment Wing
Diamond H Tail Code; Northwest Field, Guam
402d Bombardment Squadron
411th Bombardment Squadron
430th Bombardment Squadron
Inactivated in April 1946

- 504th Bombardment Group, (B-29, B-29A, 1944–1946)

Activated, March 1944
XXI BC; 313th Bombardment Wing
Circle E Tail Code; North Field, Tinian
398th Bombardment Squadron
421st Bombardment Squadron
680th Bombardment Squadron
Inactivated in June 1946

- 505th Bombardment Group, (B-29, B-29A, 1944–1946)

Activated, March 1944
XXI BC; 313th Bombardment Wing
Circle W Tail Code; North Field, Tinian
482d Bombardment Squadron
483d Bombardment Squadron
484th Bombardment Squadron
Inactivated in June 1946

- 509th Composite Group, (B-29, 1944; Silverplate B-29, 1945–1947)

Activated, December 1944
XXI BC; 315th Bombardment Wing
Various Tail Codes; North Field, Tinian
393d Bombardment Squadron
Redesignated: 509th Bombardment Group, July 1946
Became part of Strategic Air Command; assigned to 509th Bombardment Wing in November 1947.

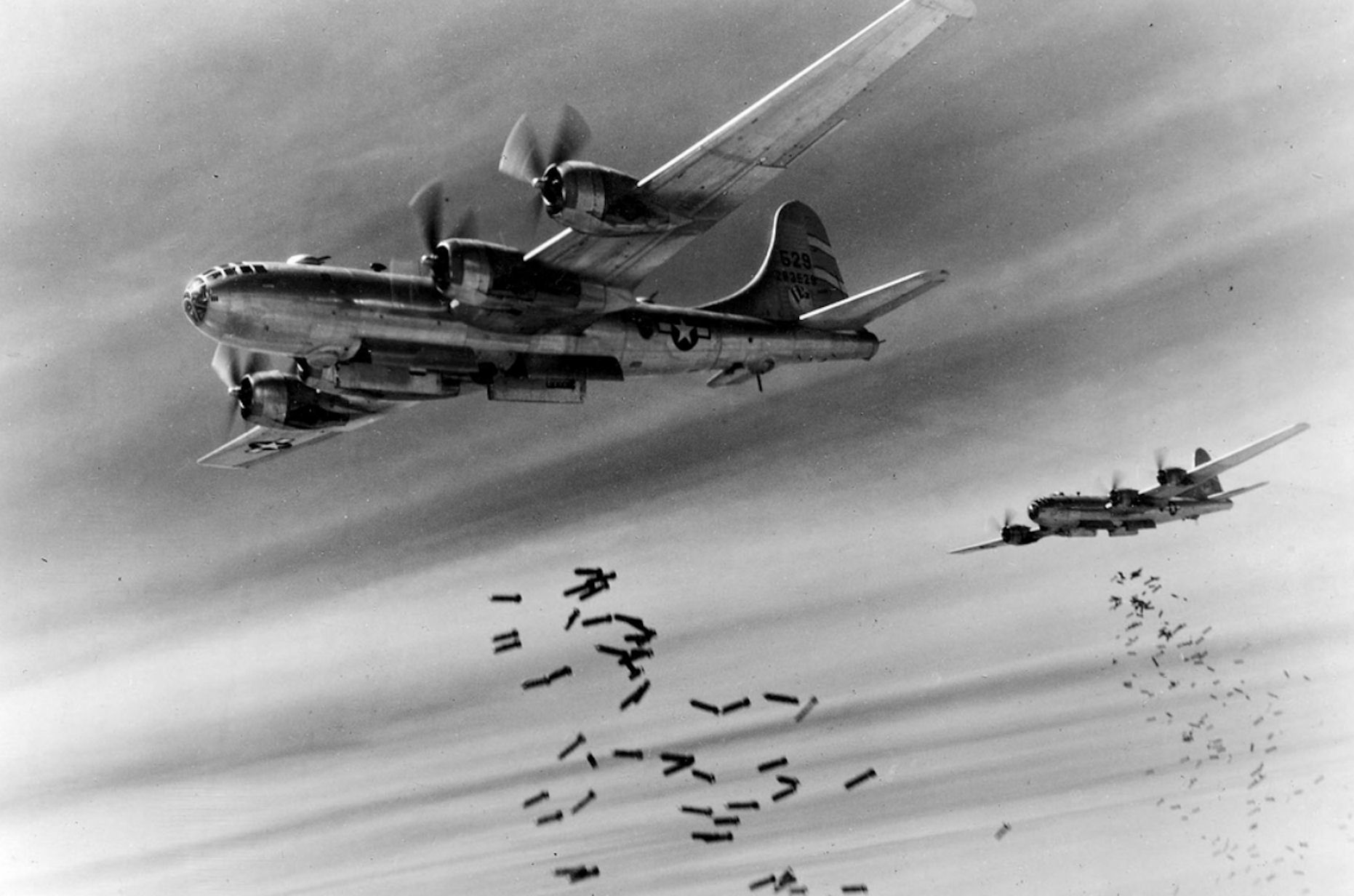
468th Bombardment Group Boeing B-29s attacking Rangoon Burma

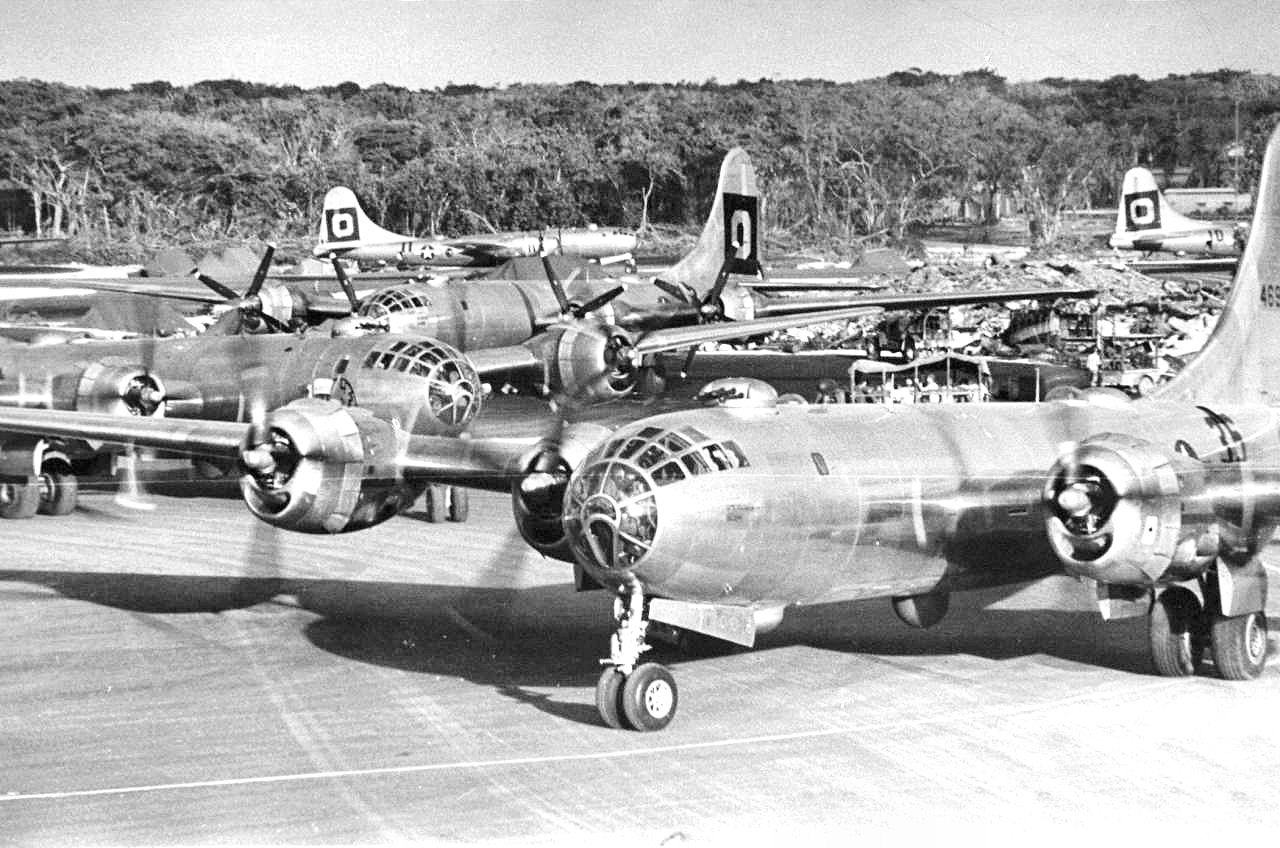
29th Bombardment Group B-29s at North Field, Guam

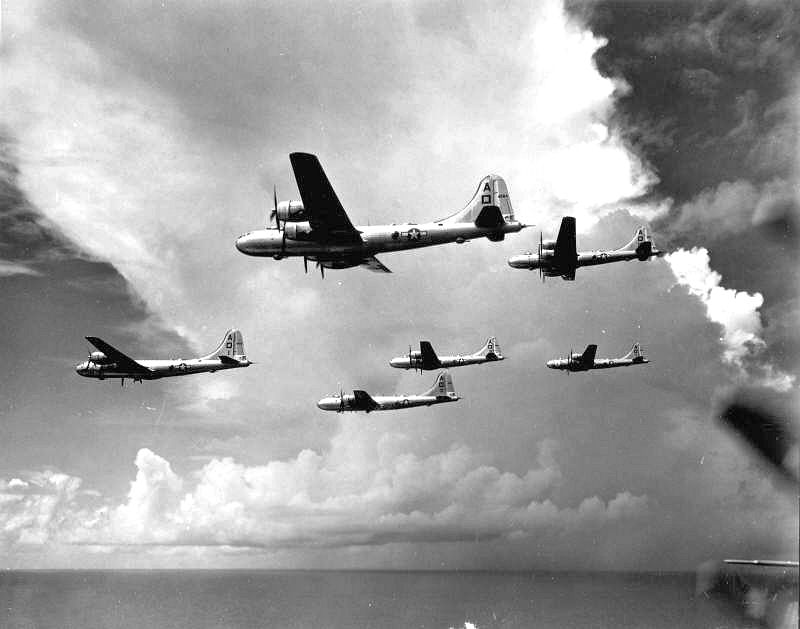
497th Bombardment Group B-29 Formation

==== Combat Reconnaissance Squadrons ====
- 1st Photographic Reconnaissance Squadron, (F-13A, 1944–1947)
- 3d Photographic Reconnaissance Squadron, (F-13A, 1944–1947)

==== Non-Combat Groups ====
Army Air Forces groups which were assigned to Second Air Force for conversion B-29 training during the summer of 1945. These groups were returned to the United States from the European Theater of Operations (ETO) after the German Capitulation in May 1945, and were programmed to redeploy to the Asiatic-Pacific Theater after their training was completed. However, the Japanese Capitulation and the end of combat in the PTO led to their inactivation after August 1945.

- 98th Bombardment Group

Reassigned from Twelfth Air Force (MTO)
Redesignated Very Heavy BG, July 1945
343d Bombardment Squadron
344th Bombardment Squadron
345th Bombardment Squadron
Inactivated in November 1945

- 450th Bombardment Group

Reassigned from Fifteenth Air Force (MTO)
Redesignated Very Heavy BG, July 1945
720th Bombardment Squadron
721st Bombardment Squadron
722d Bombardment Squadron
723d Bombardment Squadron
Inactivated in October 1945

- 466th Bombardment Group

Reassigned from Eighth Air Force (ETO)
Redesignated Very Heavy BG, August 1945
784th Bombardment Squadron
785th Bombardment Squadron
786th Bombardment Squadron
787th Bombardment Squadron
Inactivated in October 1945

- 489th Bombardment Group

Reassigned from Eighth Air Force (ETO)
Redesignated Very Heavy BG, March 1945
844th Bombardment Squadron
845th Bombardment Squadron
846th Bombardment Squadron
847th Bombardment Squadron
Inactivated in October 1945

- 472d Bombardment Group (2d AF Operational Training Unit)*

Activated in September 1943
808th Bombardment Squadron
809th Bombardment Squadron
810th Bombardment Squadron
811th Bombardment Squadron
Inactivated in April 1944

- 32d Composite Wing* (Twentieth Air Force)

Activated in August 1948 (RB-29, 1948–1949)
31st Strategic Reconnaissance Squadron
Inactivated in April 1949

- 5th Bombardment (later Reconnaissance) Group (Thirteenth Air Force)*

Redesignated Very Heavy BG, Apr 1946 (B-29)
Redesignated Reconnaissance Group, Mar 1947 (F-13A, later RB-29)
5th Reconnaissance Squadron
23d Bombardment (later Reconnaissance) Squadron
31st Bombardment (later Reconnaissance) Squadron
38th Reconnaissance Squadron
338th Reconnaissance Squadron
394th Bombardment Squadron
Assigned to: Strategic Air Command, May 1949
Assigned to: 5th Strategic Reconnaissance Wing, July 1949

.* Note: The 472d Bombardment Group was a Second Air Force Operational Training Unit for initial B-29 crew training established in 1943; the 5th Bombardment Group was redesignated and reequipped as a B-29 unit by Far East Air Forces and assigned to Thirteenth Air Force in the Philippines in 1946 from aircraft and equipment of former XXI Bomber Command units which had inactivated. The 5th BG was a prewar bomb group assigned to Hawaii at the time of the Pearl Harbor Attack; its B-17s largely destroyed on the ground at Hickam Field. The unit was reformed into a B-24 Liberator heavy bomb group after the attack and was assigned to Thirteenth AF during the war; the 32d Composite Wing flew RB-29s for Far East Air Forces in the late 1940s, primarily as photo-mapping aircraft over China, Formosa, Indochina and Korea.

==== Strategic Air Command (Groups) ====
Army Air Forces B-29 bomb groups assigned to Strategic Air Command (SAC) after the command's establishment in March 1946. Includes groups that were returned to the United States from the European Theater and were programmed to redeploy to the Central Pacific Area after their B-29 conversion training was completed. These units were retained on active service after the Japanese Capitulation in August 1945 and were assigned to Continental Air Forces (CAF). In March 1946 were transferred to SAC upon redesignation of CAF to SAC.

Many of these units and squadrons were under-manned and under-equipped due to the rapid demobilization of the armed forces in this period. In addition, frequent inactivations and activations were made, with older, prewar units being reactivated in place of younger, wartime units. Up until the end of the Korean War, SAC used tail markings that consisted of a combination of geometric shapes and letters. The shape indicated the Numbered Air Force, with a triangle representing the Eighth Air Force; a circle for Fifteenth Air Force and a square for Second Air Force. This system was phased out in 1953.

- 2d Bombardment Group, (B-29, 1947–1948)

Activated in July 1947
Chatham AFB, Georgia
Tail Code: Empty Square
20th Bombardment Squadron
49th Bombardment Squadron
96th Bombardment Squadron
Re-equipped with B-50 Superfortress, July 1948

- 7th Bombardment Group, (B-29, 1946–1948)

Activated in October 1946
Carswell AFB, Texas
Tail Code: Empty Triangle
9th Bombardment Squadron
436th Bombardment Squadron
492d Bombardment Squadron
Re-equipped with B-36 Peacemaker, July 1948

- 22d Bombardment Group, (B-29, 1948–1952)

Reassigned from Fifth Air Force (WPA)
Redesignated Very Heavy BG, June 1946
March AFB, California
Tail Code: Circle-E
2d Bombardment Squadron
19th Bombardment Squadron
33d Bombardment Squadron
Group assigned to 22d Bombardment Wing, June 1952

- 28th Bombardment Group, (B-29, 1946–1950)

Activated in July 1946 from a/p/e of inactivated 449th Bombardment Group
Ellsworth AFB, South Dakota
Tail Code: Triangle-S
77th Bombardment Squadron
717th Bombardment Squadron
718th Bombardment Squadron
Re-equipped with RB-29 Superfortress, April 1950
Re-equipped with B-36 Peacemaker, July 1950

- 43d Bombardment Group, (B-29, 1946–1948)

Activated in October 1946 from a/p/e of inactivated 444th Bombardment Group
Davis-Monthan AFB, Arizona
Tail Code: Circle-K
63d Bombardment Squadron
64th Bombardment Squadron
65th Bombardment Squadron
Re-equipped with B-50 Superfortress, July 1948

- 92d Bombardment Group, (B-29, 1946–1952)

Reassigned from Eighth Air Force (ETO)
Redesignated Very Heavy BG, July 1946
Fairchild AFB, Washington
Tail Code: Circle-W
325th Bombardment Squadron
326th Bombardment Squadron
327th Bombardment Squadron
Group assigned to 92d Bombardment Wing, June 1952

- 93d Bombardment Group, (B-29, 1947–1949)

Reassigned from Eighth Air Force (ETO)
Redesignated Very Heavy BG, July 1945
Castle AFB, California
Tail Code: Circle-M
328th Bombardment Squadron
329th Bombardment Squadron
330th Bombardment Squadron
Re-equipped with B-50 Superfortress, July 1949

- 97th Bombardment Group, (B-29, 1946–1950)

Activated in August 1946 from a/p/e of inactivated 485th Bombardment Group
Eielson AFB, Alaska; Smoky Hill AFB, Kansas; Biggs AFB, Texas
Tail Code: Triangle-O
340th Bombardment Squadron
341st Bombardment Squadron
342d Bombardment Squadron
Re-equipped with B-50 Superfortress, 1950
Re-equipped with B-47 Stratojet, 1955

- 301st Bombardment Group, (B-29, 1946–1952)

Activated in August 1946 from a/p/e of inactivated 467th Bombardment Group
Smoky Hill AFB, Kansas
Tail Code: Square-A
32d Bombardment Squadron
352d Bombardment Squadron
353d Bombardment Squadron
Group assigned to 301st Bombardment Wing, June 1952

- 307th Bombardment Group, (B-29, 1947–1952)

Activated in August 1946 from a/p/e of inactivated 498th Bombardment Group
MacDill AFB, Florida; Yokota AB, Japan
Tail Code: Square-Y
370th Bombardment Squadron
371st Bombardment Squadron
372d Bombardment Squadron
Group assigned to 307th Bombardment Wing, June 1952

- 448th Bombardment Group, (B-29, 1945–1946)

Reassigned from Eighth Air Force (ETO)
Redesignated Very Heavy BG, August 1945
Fort Worth Army Airfield, Texas
Tail Code: Triangle-N
712th Bombardment Squadron
713th Bombardment Squadron
714th Bombardment Squadron
715th Bombardment Squadron
Inactivated August 1946

- 449th Bombardment Group, (B-29, 1945–1946)

Reassigned from Fifteenth Air Force (MTO)
Redesignated Very Heavy BG, May 1945
Fort Worth Army Airfield, Texas
716th Bombardment Squadron
717th Bombardment Squadron
718th Bombardment Squadron
Inactivated August 1946, Aircraft Reassigned to 28th Bombardment Group

- 458th Bombardment Group, (B-29, 1945–1946)

Reassigned from Eighth Air Force (ETO)
Redesignated Very Heavy BG, August 1945
March Field, California
752d Bombardment Squadron
753d Bombardment Squadron
754th Bombardment Squadron
755th Bombardment Squadron
Inactivated in July 1946

- 485th Bombardment Group, (B-29, 1945–1946)

Reassigned from Fifteenth Air Force (MTO)
Redesignated Very Heavy BG, August 1945
Smoky Hill Army Airfield, Kansas
506th Bombardment Squadron
828th Bombardment Squadron
829th Bombardment Squadron
830th Bombardment Squadron
Inactivated August 1946

- 509th Bombardment Group

See Combat Groups Section

==== SAC Reconnaissance Squadrons ====
- 9th Reconnaissance Squadron (Very Long Range), (F-13A, 1949)

Assigned to: 314th Composite Wing, 20 June 1946 – 20 October 1947

- 16th Photographic Squadron, (F-13A 1947)

Assigned to: 55th Reconnaissance Group, 1 June – 16 December 1947

- 31st Strategic Reconnaissance Squadron (Very Long Range), (F-13A, 1947–1948)

Assigned to: 71st Reconnaissance Group

- 46th/72d Reconnaissance Squadron (Very Long Range, Photographic), (F-13A, 1946–1947)

Assigned to: Strategic Air Command, 1 May 1946 – 13 October 1947

Attached entire time to: Yukon Sector, Alaskan Air Command

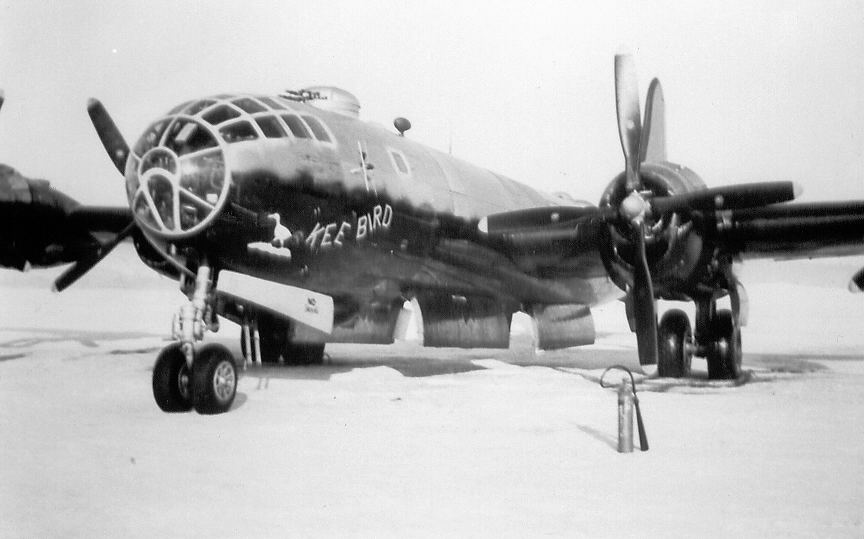
B-29-95-BW Superfortress, 45-21768, "Kee Bird" of the 46th/72d Reconnaissance Squadron. This aircraft became marooned after making an emergency landing in northwest Greenland during a Cold War strategic reconnaissance mission on 21 February 1947 and was attempted to be recovered in 1995. The recovery effort failed, and the aircraft was accidentally destroyed in the process.

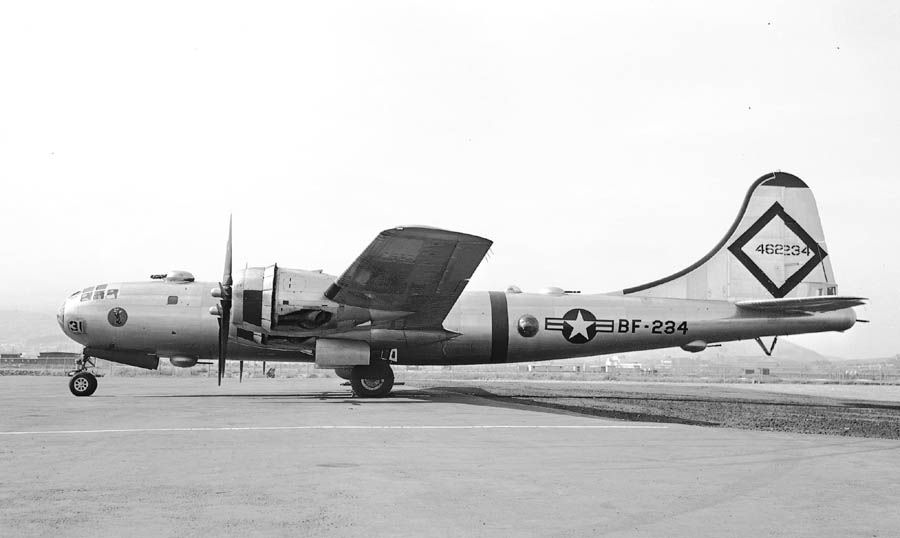
B-29A-70-BN Superfortres 44-62234, 6th Bombardment Wing, 24th Bombardment Squadron about 1948. Notice the postwar USAF emblem, also the "Buzz Code" BF for B-29s, and the SAC diamond group tail code, prior to their elimination in 1953.

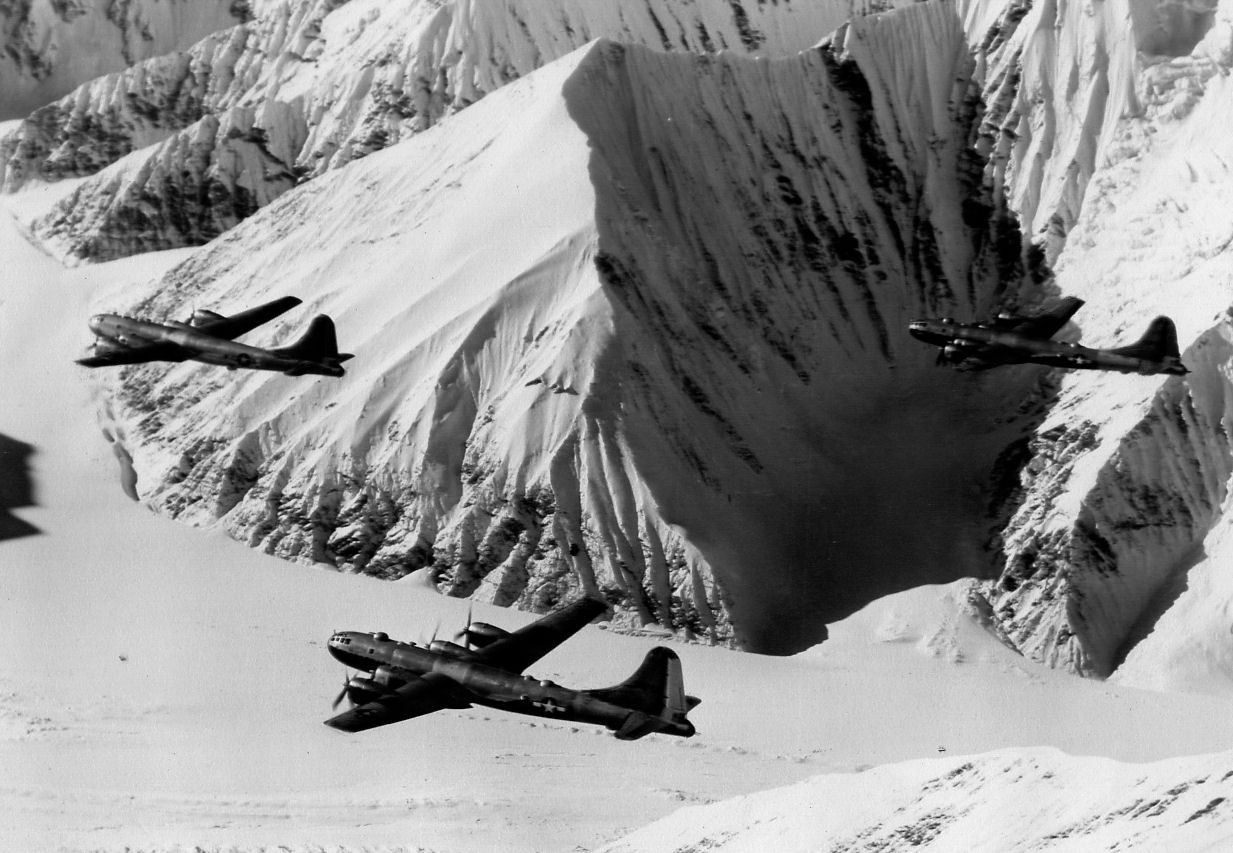
RB-29s of the 72d Reconnaissance Squadron over Alaska, 1947

=== United States Air Force ===
==== Strategic Air Command (Wings) ====
The B-29 was the mainstay of Strategic Air Command after World War II until the Korean War. B-29 "Very Heavy" bomber units were redesignated "Medium" with the introduction of the B-36 Peacemaker into the inventory in 1948, with some units transitioning to the B-36/RB-36 beginning in 1949. The B-50 Superfortress, an advanced version of the B-29 was also introduced in 1949.

SAC deployed non nuclear-capable B-29 groups to Far East Air Forces in 1950 to conduct strategic bombardment missions over the skies of North Korea, however the aircraft was made obsolete by the development of Soviet jet-powered interceptors such as the MiG-15. The B-29 soldiered on for a more few years in the strategic bombardment role, but by 1955 was replaced by the B-47 Stratojet medium bomber.

In 1950, conversions of B-29s to KB-29P aerial tankers began to reach SAC squadrons. KB-29s were in service with SAC until being replaced by the KC-97 Stratofreighter (which was itself based on the B-29) by 1955.

- 1st Fighter Wing, (B-29, 1949)

March AFB, California
Assigned to Headquarters 1st FW while attached to 22d Bombardment Wing

- 5th Strategic Reconnaissance Wing (B-29, 1949; RB-29, 1949–1951; KB-29 1949–1951)

Activated in July 1949
Mountain Home AFB, Idaho
Tail Code: Circle-X
23d Strategic Reconnaissance Squadron
31st Strategic Reconnaissance Squadron
72d Strategic Reconnaissance Squadron
Replaced by RB-36D Peacemaker in 1951

- 6th Bombardment Wing (B-29, 1951–1952)

Activated in January 1951
Walker AFB, New Mexico
Tail Code: Empty Triangle
24th Bombardment Squadron
39th Bombardment Squadron
40th Bombardment Squadron
6th Air Refueling Squadron (KB-29, 1951–1952)
Replaced by B-36D Peacemaker in 1951

- 9th Bombardment Wing (B-29, 1949–1954; RB-29, 1949–1951)

Activated in May 1949
Mountain Home AFB, Idaho
Tail Code: Circle-R
1st Bombardment Squadron
5th Bombardment Squadron
99th Bombardment Squadron
9th Air Refueling Squadron (KB-29, 1953)
Replaced by B-47 Stratojet in 1954

- 22d Bombardment Wing (B-29, 1949–1954)

Activated in July 1948
Combat in Korean War, Jul–Oct 1950
March AFB, California
Tail Code: Circle-E
2d Bombardment Squadron
19th Bombardment Squadron
33d Bombardment Squadron
Replaced by B-47 Stratojet in 1954

- 27th Strategic Fighter Wing

Bergstrom AFB, Texas
27th Air Refueling Squadron (KB-29, 1953–1957)

- 40th Bombardment Wing (B-29, 1953)

Activated in May 1952
Shilling AFB, Kansas
Tail Code: Triangle-S
25th Bombardment Squadron
44th Bombardment Squadron
45th Bombardment Squadron
Replaced by B-47 Stratojet in 1953

- 44th Bombardment Wing (TB-29, 1951; B-29, 1951–1953)

Activated in January 1951
Lake Charles AFB, Louisiana
Tail Code: Triangle-S
66th Bombardment Squadron
67th Bombardment Squadron
68th Bombardment Squadron
Replaced by B-47 Stratojet in 1953

- 55th Strategic Reconnaissance Wing, (B/RB-29, 1951)

Activated in June 1948
Forbes AFB, Kansas
Tail Code: Square-V
38th Strategic Reconnaissance Squadron
338th Strategic Reconnaissance Squadron
343d Strategic Reconnaissance Squadron
Replaced by RB-50 Superfortress in 1951

- 68th Bombardment Wing, (B-29, 1952–1953)

Activated in October 1951
Lake Charles AFB, Louisiana
Tail Code: Unknown
27th Bombardment Squadron
51st Bombardment Squadron
52d Bombardment Squadron
Replaced by B-47 Stratojet in 1953

- 90th Bombardment Wing, (B-29, 1951–1954; RB-29, 1951–1954; TB-29, 1951–1952)

Activated in January 1951
Fairchild AFB, Washington
Tail Code: Circle-Z
319th Bombardment Squadron
320th Bombardment Squadron
321st Bombardment Squadron
Replaced by RB-47 Stratojet in 1954

- 91st Strategic Reconnaissance Wing, (B-29, 1948–1949; RB-29, 1948–1951; TB-29, 1948–1949; TRB-29, 1949)

Activated in October 1948
McGuire AFB, New Jersey; Barksdale AFB, Louisiana, Lockbourne AFB, Ohio
Tail Code: Square-I
322d Strategic Reconnaissance Squadron
323d Strategic Reconnaissance Squadron
324th Strategic Reconnaissance Squadron
91st Air Refueling Squadron, (KB-29, 1950–1953)
Replaced by RB-50 Superfortress in 1951

- 301st Bombardment Wing, (B-29, 1951–1953)

Activated in November 1947
Barksdale AFB, Louisiana
Tail Code: Square-A
32d Bombardment Squadron
352d Bombardment Squadron
353d Bombardment Squadron
301st Air Refueling Squadron (KB-29, 1949–1953)
Replaced by B-47 Stratojet in 1953

- 303d Bombardment Wing, (B-29, 1951–1953)

Activated in September 1951
Davis-Monthan AFB, Arizona
Tail Code: Square-A
358th Bombardment Squadron
359th Bombardment Squadron
360th Bombardment Squadron
9th Air Refueling Squadron (KB-29, 1952–1953)
Replaced by B-47 Stratojet in 1953

- 305th Bombardment Wing, (B-29, 1951–1953)

Activated in January 1951
MacDill AFB, Florida
Tail Code: Unknown
364th Bombardment Squadron
365th Bombardment Squadron
366th Bombardment Squadron
Replaced by B-47 Stratojet in 1952

- 310th Bombardment Wing, (B-29, 1952–1954)

Activated in March 1952
Forbes AFB, Kansas; Shilling AFB, Kansas
Tail Code: Unknown
379th Bombardment Squadron
380th Bombardment Squadron
381st Bombardment Squadron
Replaced by B-47 Stratojet in 1954

- 320th Bombardment Wing, (B-29, 1952–1953)

Activated in December 1952
March AFB, California
Tail Code: Circle-A
441st Bombardment Squadron
442d Bombardment Squadron
443d Bombardment Squadron
444th Bombardment Squadron
Replaced by B-47 Stratojet in 1953

- 376th Bombardment Wing, (B-29, 1951–1954)

Activated in May 1951
Forbes AFB, Kansas; Barksdale AFB, Louisiana
Tail Code: Unknown
512th Bombardment Squadron
513th Bombardment Squadron
514th Bombardment Squadron
Replaced by B-47 Stratojet in 1954

- 506th Strategic Fighter Wing

Dow AFB, Maine
506th Air Refueling Squadron (KB-29, 1954–1955)

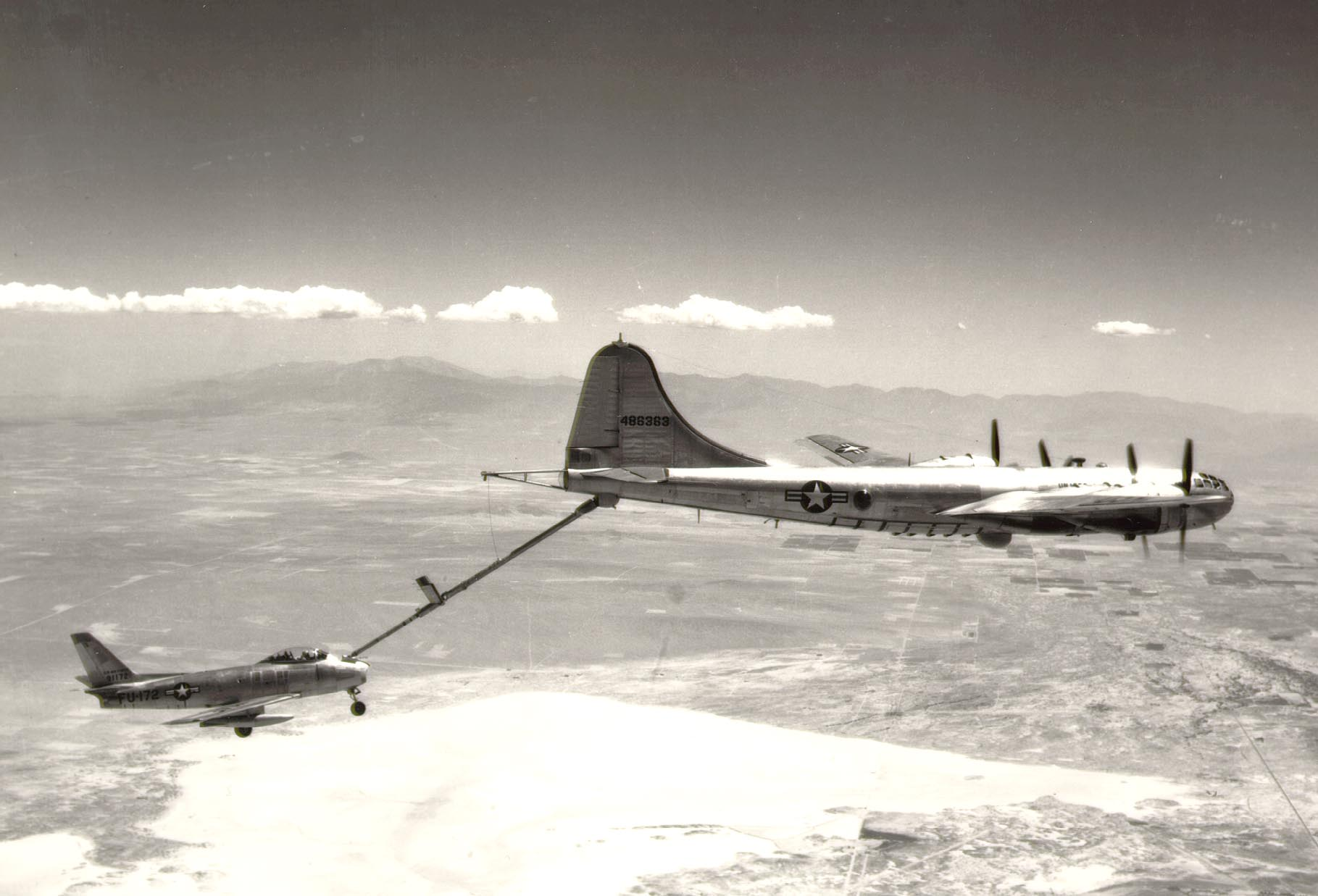
A KB-29M delivers fuel to an F-86A Sabre over Rogers Dry Lake. Note that the fighter is flying nose-high in order to match its speed to the slower tanker; even so, it had to lower its landing gear for additional drag.

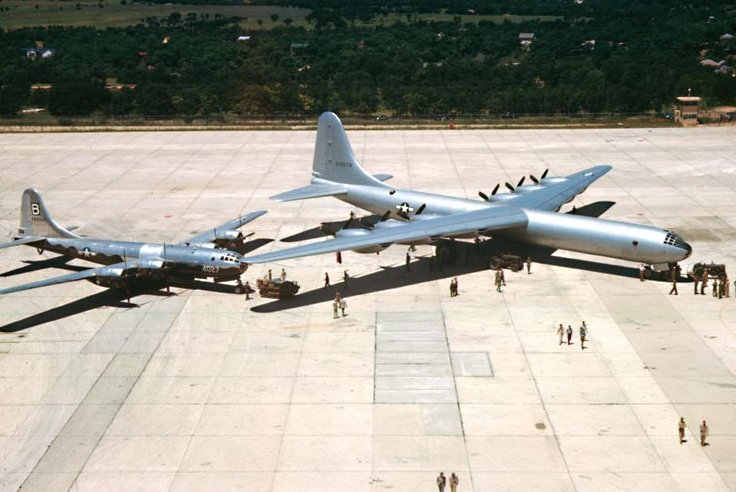
Arrival of the first B-36A at Carswell "City of Fort Worth" (AF Serial No. 44-92015), in June, 1948 along with a 7th Bomb Wing B-29

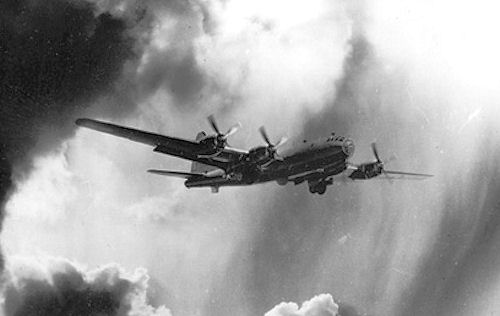
WB-29 in flight in a storm, 1947

==== Tactical Air Command ====
After the Korean War and the phaseout of the B-29/KB-29 from SAC, KB-29s were acquired by Tactical Air Command to serve as dedicated aerial refueling tankers for Tactical Fighter aircraft to give TAC a worldwide deployment capability separate from SAC. However, it was found that the KB-29 was totally unsuitable for the refuelling of jet fighters because it was too slow. The KB-29s were replaced beginning in 1956 with faster KB-50s.

- 420th Air Refueling Squadron, (KB-29M, 1954–1955) (USAFE)
- 421st Air Refueling Squadron, (KB-29M, 1954–1955) (PACAF)
- 427th Air Refueling Squadron, (KB-29M, 1956–1959)
- 429th Air Refueling Squadron, (KB-29M, 1954–1958)
- 431st Air Refueling Squadron, (KB-29M, 1957)
- 622d Air Refueling Squadron, (KB-29M, 1955–1957)

==== Air Resupply And Communications Service ====
During the Cold War, the Military Air Transport Service the controlling command for Air Commando units which performed special operations during the 1950s, including during the Korean War. As part of the equipment used by the Air Resupply And Communications Service (ARCS) were B-29s modified for special operations missions.

- 580th Air Resupply and Communications Wing, (B-29, 1951–1956)
- 581st Air Resupply and Communications Wing, (B-29, 1951–1956)
- 582nd Air Resupply and Communications Wing, (B-29, 1952–1956)

==== Air Weather Service ====
Air Weather Service (part of Military Air Transport Service) received their first B-29s in various versions (B-29, RB-29, TB-29, WB-29) in 1946 AWS initially used B-29s in support of the 1946 Operation Crossroads atomic bomb tests at Bikini Atoll.

Weather reconnaissance duties required special variant of the B-29. Armament and related equipment was removed and in place of upper forward turret astrodome was installed. Additional radio and specialized meteorological equipment was installed and such refitted aircraft was redesignated WB-29. While the B-29's "public" mission was that of weather reconnaissance, the "covert" mission, that of atmospheric sampling for radiation debris, was perhaps the more critical task.

WB-29s soldiered on through the mid-1950s, providing critical data on tropical storms, nuclear tests, and many other routine but important reconnaissance tasks. But the airplanes were weary, and by 1956 were replaced by a modification of seventy-eight B-50Ds to WB-50 configuration.

- 53d Reconnaissance Squadron (Very Long Range, Weather)

Kindley AFB, Bermuda (B-29, 1946–1947. WB-29, 1951–1956)

- 54th Reconnaissance Squadron (Very Long Range, Weather)

Andersen AFB, Guam (B-29, 1946–1947. WB-29, 1951–1956)

- 55th Reconnaissance Squadron (Very Long Range, Weather)

Fairfield-Suisun AFB, (later McClellan AFB), California (B-29, 1946–1947. TB-29/WB-29, 1951–1955)

- 56th Reconnaissance Squadron (Very Long Range, Weather)

Yokota AB, Japan (WB-29, 1951–1957)

- 57th Reconnaissance Squadron (Very Long Range, Weather)

Hickam AFB, Hawaii Territory (WB-29, 1951–1956)

- 58th Reconnaissance Squadron (Very Long Range, Weather)

Eielson AFB, Alaska Territory (WB-29, 1951–1956)

- 59th Reconnaissance Squadron (Very Long Range, Weather)

Ladd AFB. Alaska Territory (B-29, 1946–1947. WB-29, 1955–1956)

- 512th Reconnaissance Squadron (Very Long Range, Weather)* (B-29, 1949–1954 RB-29/WB-29, 1949–1951)
- 513th Reconnaissance Squadron (Very Long Range, Weather)* (B-29, 1951–1954 RB-29/WB-29, 1950–1951)
- 514th Reconnaissance Squadron (Very Long Range, Weather)* (B-29, 1951–1954 TB-29/RB-29/WB-29, 1947–1951)
- 1st Weather Reconnaissance Squadron (Special) (later 2078th Weather Reconnaissance Squadron)& (WB-29, 1948–1950)

NOTE: *Under operational control of Far East Air Forces flying combat weather reconnaissance missions over North Korea during the Korean War

==== Weapons Systems Development and Testing ====
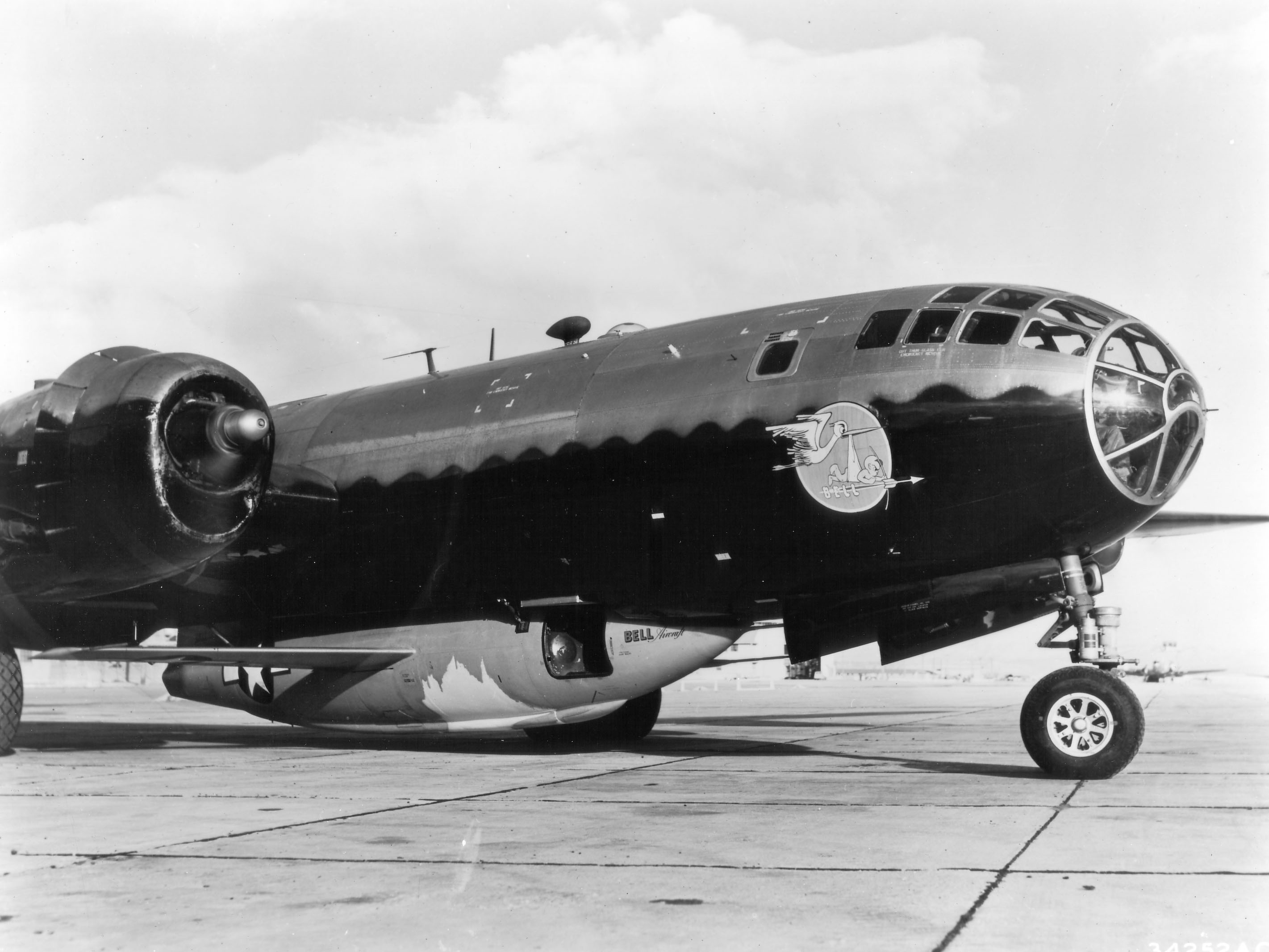
Bell X-1A resting in the belly of a B-29 Superfortress at Edwards AFB, 1953.

- Air Technical Service Command/Air Materiel Command/Air Research and Development Command, Muroc AAF/AFB (later Edwards AFB), California
- Air Proving Ground Command, Eglin AFB, Florida

B-29-96-BW serial number 45-21800 was used as the "mother" aircraft for launches of the Bell X-1 rocket-powered research aircraft at Edwards AFB. On October 14, 1947, Capt Charles E. "Chuck" Yeager was dropped in his X-1 from the B-29 and was credited as the first human to pilot an aircraft faster than the speed of sound.

Several B-29s were modified for various experimental purposes under the designation EB-29. Perhaps the best known of these was the EB-29 used as the carrier aircraft for the McDonnell XF-85 Goblin parasite fighter in 1948. The rear bomb bay was modified to carry a special cradle from which the XF-85 could be launched and retrieved in flight.

Other B-29s flown at Eglin/Muroc/Edwards AFB were XB-29E fire control test model; XG-29G (44-84043) which served as a flying test bed for J-35, J-47 and J-73 jet engines mounted in the bomb bay; the YB-29H used for special armament testing; YB-29J used for services testing of improved engine designs; QB-29 target drones. The CB-29K was an experimental transport version.

==== Air Defense Command ====
Beginning in 1954, the 4754th Radar Evaluation Squadron, Air Defense Command operated B-29s from various bases in the United States to provide ECM training and evaluation services to its radar site personnel. The B-29s contained an assortment of RADAR jamming devices to provide the required training of personnel.

- 4754th Radar Evaluation Electronics Counter-Countermeasure Flight, Hamilton AFB, California
- 4677th Radar Evaluation Electronics Counter-Countermeasure Flight, Hill AFB, Utah
- 4713th Radar Evaluation Flight, Griffiss AFB, New York
- 6023d Radar Evaluation Squadron, Naha AB, Okinawa (attached to Pacific Air Forces)

The last B-29 (a TB-29 radar evaluation aircraft, B-29-15-MO serial number 42-65234) was retired from the USAF inventory at 2010 hours on June 21, 1960, when Major Clarence C. Rarick of the 6023d Radar Evaluation Squadron landed at Naha Air Base, Okinawa, bringing the era of B-29 Superfortress military service to an end.

=== United States Navy ===
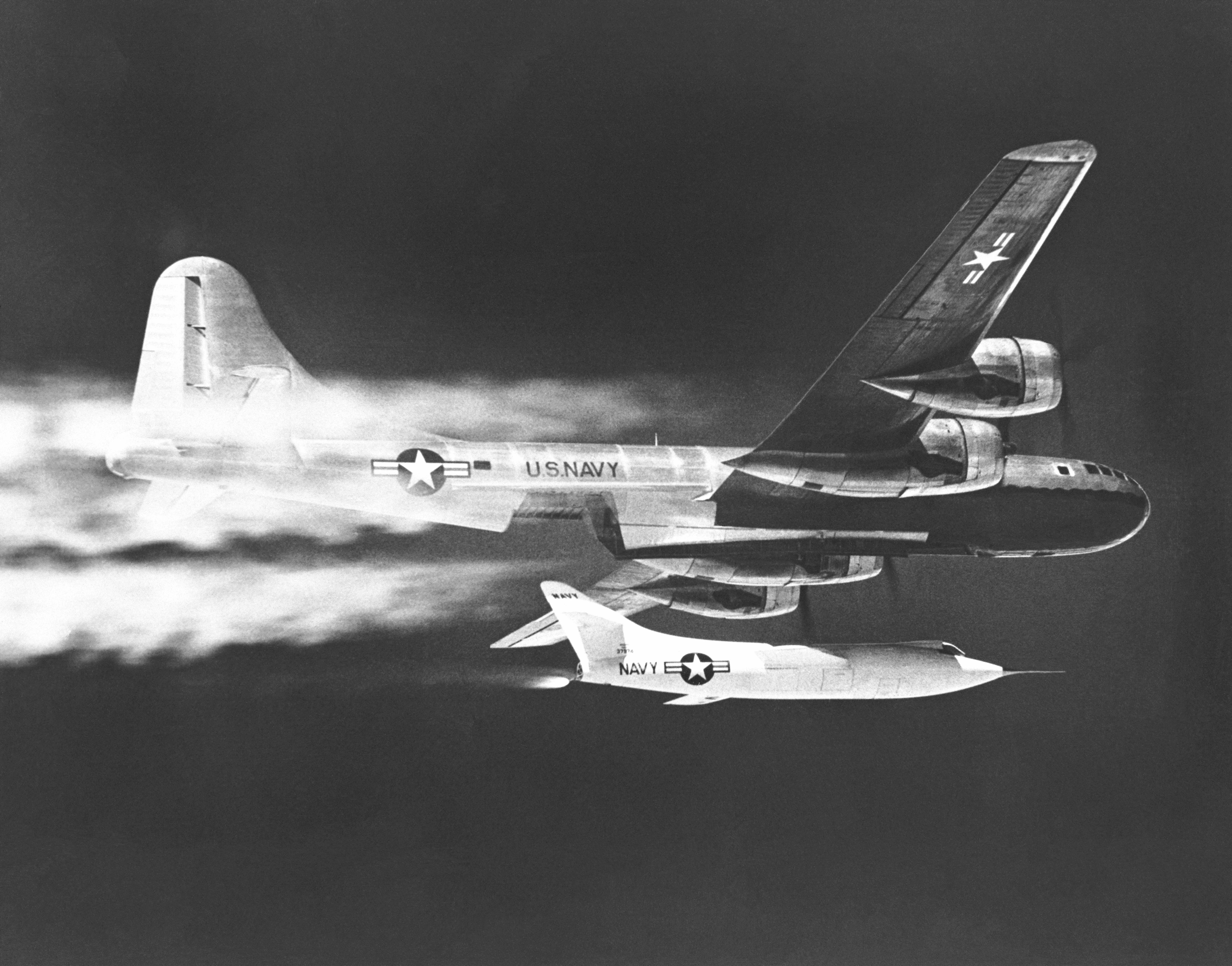
A U.S. Navy P2B-1S (BuNo 84029 "Fertile Myrtle") dropping the D-558-2 experimental high-speed research aircraft, 1950

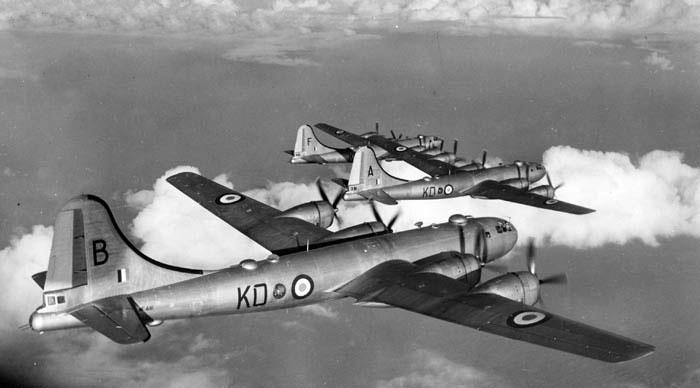
3 Boeing B-29s in RAF service, about 1951

The United States Navy received four B-29s on April 14, 1947 and redesignated as P2B. Two of these aircraft were in standard configuration (P2B-1S), two another were equipped with test radar and additional fuel tank in bomb bay (P2B-2S).

- P2B-1S BuNo 84028 (B-29-95-BW 45-21789)
- P2B-1S BuNo 84029 (B-29-95-BW 45-21787)
- P2B-2S BuNo 84030 (B-29-95-BW 45-21791)
- P2B-2S BuNo 84031 (B-29-90-BW 44-87766)

Naval B-29s were used as test beds and as mother ships in various programs. One P2B-1S was extensively modified to carry the Douglas D-558-II Skyrocket supersonic rocket-powered research aircraft. The first Skyrocket launch took place on September 8, 1950. The Skyrocket exceeded Mach 2 for the first time on November 20, 1953 (piloted by Scott Crossfield). The last Skyrocket flight took place in December 1956.

P2B-1S BuNo 84029 was later transferred to NACA for continuation of high-speed flight tests and was redesignated as NACA-137. It was eventually sold to a civilian owner, a museum in Oakland, California. This was the only example of a flyable B-29 ever being sold to a civilian operator. This B-29 was flown on rare occasions under the civil registration N91329. After many years of inactivity, it was sold to the Kermit Weeks Aviation Museum of Miami, Florida. It was transported there disassembled in 1987. It was registered with the Weeks Museum as N29KW.

== Allied nations ==
=== United Kingdom ===
During the early 1950s, the Royal Air Force urgently needed interim aircraft for its bomber units, as a "stop gap" replacement for the Avro Lincoln, until British-designed and manufactured jets like the English Electric Canberra and, in the longer term, the so-called "V bombers", became operational. From the RAF's point of view the B-29, was a heavy bomber comparable to the Lincoln, albeit with distinct performance and capacity advantages and, as a type that had already been proven operationally, did not detract from the development of the British jets.

A formal agreement with the USA was signed on January 27, 1950 and the USAF loaned the RAF seventy B-29 bombers which received the serials WF434-WF448, WF490-WF-514 and WF545-WF574. Later another 18 were delivered under serials WW342-WW356 and WZ966-WZ968. The aircraft received the service name Boeing Washington B.1 (B.1 from "Bomber Mark 1") with RAF Bomber Command from 1950 as a longer-range nuclear-capable bomber, pending the introduction of the English Electric Canberra in quantity.

Most of the airframes were taken out of USAF storage and were virtually new, having been delivered at the end of the Pacific War, although a small number came from operational units. The first four aircraft were delivered to the Washington Conversion Unit at RAF Marham on March 22, 1950. All B-29s for the RAF were ferried by the crews of the 307th Bombardment Wing USAF. The first unit converted to Washingtons was No. 115 Squadron RAF which flown from USA in June 1950. Two RAF Washingtons took part in the Laurence Minot SAC bombing competition in 1951 alongside USAF B-29s.

Squadrons based at RAF Coningsby were converted to English Electric Canberra bombers in 1953. Squadrons from RAF Marham were converted a year later. Most Washingtons were returned to the United States, being flown by RAF crews to Dover AFB; then subsequently to the aircraft storage facility at Davis-Monthan AFB. A small number of Washingtons remained in the United Kingdom, being used by 192 Sq. for Electronic Intelligence operations until 1958; later being used as ground target airframes for RAF combat aircraft.

Royal Air Force

- RAF Marham

No. 35 Squadron RAF
No. 90 Squadron RAF
No. 115 Squadron RAF
No. 207 Squadron RAF

- RAF Coningsby

No. 15 Squadron RAF
No. 44 Squadron RAF
No. 57 Squadron RAF (moved from RAF Waddington in April 1952)
No. 149 Squadron RAF

- RAF Watton

No. 192 Squadron RAF operated Washingtons between April 1952 and February 1958.

=== Australia ===
Two ex-RAF Washingtons (WW354 and WW353) (former USAAF 44-61963; 44-62049) were turned over by the RAF to the Royal Australian Air Force Aeronautical Research and Development Unit in late 1952 and conducted trials for the United Kingdom's Ministry of Supply. They were assigned the RAAF serials A76-1 and A76-2. Both aircraft were retired in 1956 and sold for scrap in 1957.

Royal Australian Air Force

- Aeronautical Research and Development Unit

== See also ==
- Boeing 377
- Tupolev Tu-4
