= 541st Bombardment Squadron =

541st Bombardment Squadron (later 541st Special Operations Squadron)
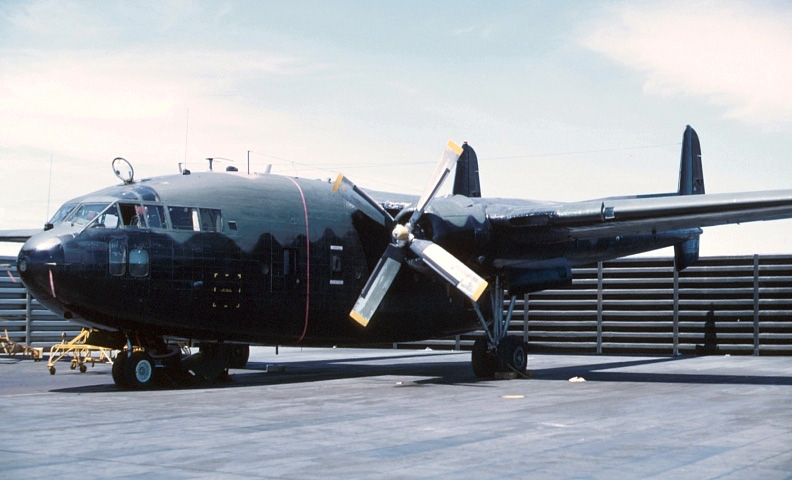
- AC-119 Stinger as flown by the 1st Tactical Airlift Training Squadron
- Active: 1942–1944; 1944–1949; 1968–1973
- Country: United States
- Branch: United States Air Force
- Role: Crew training

The 541st Bombardment Squadron is the former name of the 541st Special Operations Squadron, an inactive United States Air Force (USAF) unit. During World War II the 541st served as a heavy bomber training unit until inactivated in a general reorganization of Army Air Forces training units. The squadron was redesignated in 1985, when it was consolidated with two other units.

The first of these was the 161st Liaison Squadron which served as a light aerial reconnaissance and support unit in the United States and Panama from 1944 through 1949. The second was the 1st Tactical Airlift Training Squadron, a reserve unit that trained USAF and allied countries on the Fairchild AC-119 Stinger gunship from 1968 through 1973. The squadron has not been active since consolidation.

== History ==
=== Heavy bomber training ===
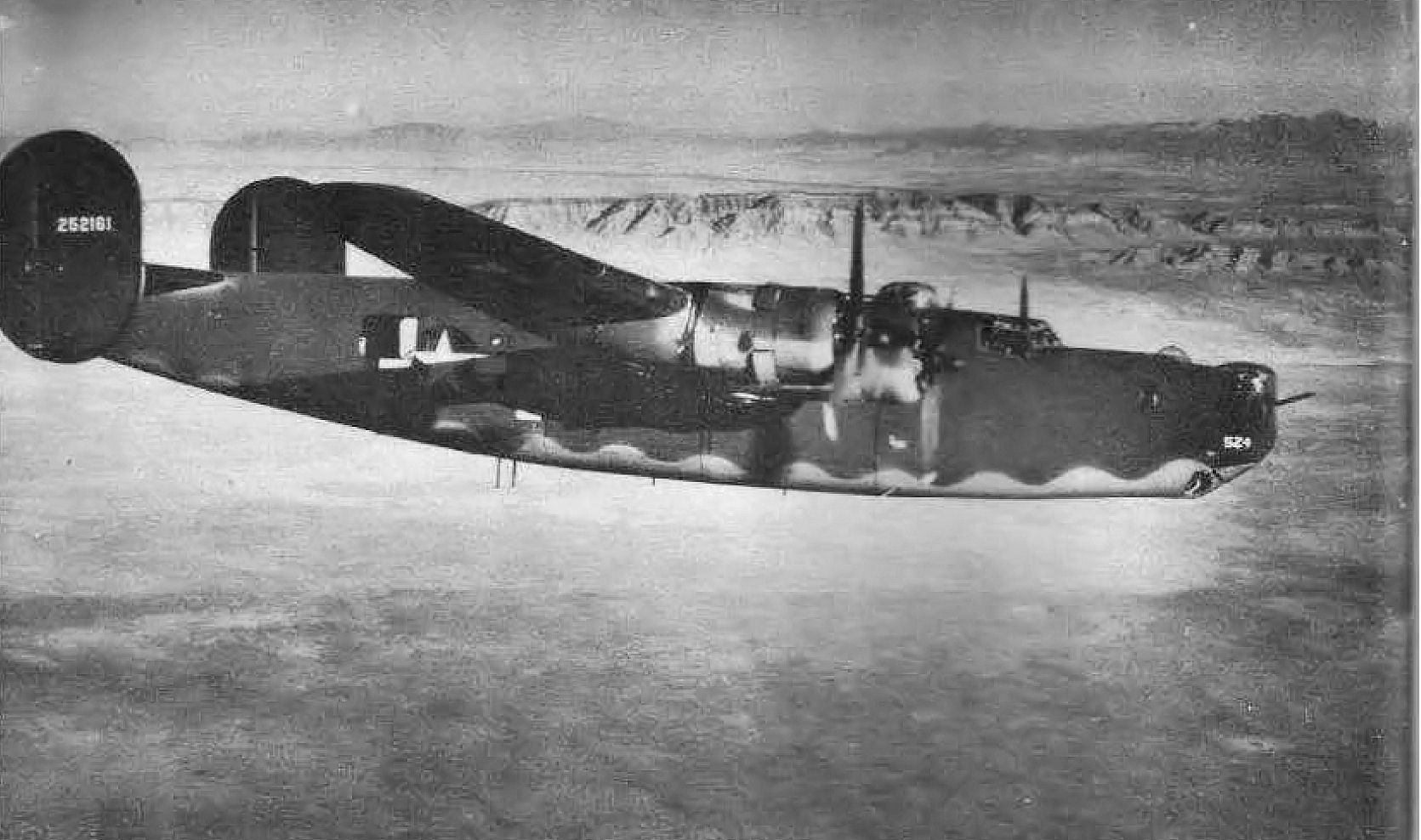
B-24 Liberator of a training unit in the southwest

The first predecessor of the squadron was the 541st Bombardment Squadron, which was activated at Salt Lake City Army Air Base, Utah as one of the four original squadrons of the 383d Bombardment Group. Its cadre moved to Rapid City Army Air Base a little over a week later, where it began to equip as a Boeing B-17 Flying Fortress Operational Training Unit (OTU) the following year. OTUs were oversized parent units that provided cadres to "satellite groups"

In October 1943, the squadron moved to Peterson Field, Colorado, where it flew Consolidated B-24 Liberator and changed its mission to become a Replacement Training Unit (RTU). Like OTUs, RTUs were oversized units, but their mission was to train individual aircrews. However, the AAF was finding that standard military units like the 541st, which were based on relatively inflexible tables of organization were not well adapted to the training mission. Accordingly, it adopted a more functional system in which each base was organized into a separate numbered unit, which was manned and equipped for the specific training mission. As a result, the 383d Group, its elements and supporting units were inactivated or disbanded and replaced by the 214th AAF Base Unit (Combat Crew Training School, Heavy), which was simultaneously organized at Peterson.

=== Liaison operations ===
The second predecessor of the squadron was the 161st Liaison Squadron, which was activated at Statesboro Army Air Field, Georgia on 15 May 1944. The squadron served at a number of stations, mostly in the southern United States until it moved to the Panama Canal Zone in September 1946. It served in Panama until inactivating in June 1949, as President Truman’s reduced 1949 defense budget required reductions in the number of units in the Air Force,

=== AC-119 training ===
The third predecessor of the squadron was formed as the 1st Combat Crew Training Squadron at Clinton County Air Force Base, Ohio on 1 July 1968, when it absorbed the personnel and equipment of the Combat Crew Training Squadron, Provisional, 302d, which had been organized on 1 April 1968 to provide aircrew training on the Fairchild AC-119 Stinger gunship. The provisional squadron remained active until 1 August, but only as a paper unit. Although a reserve unit, the squadron provided training for regular Air Force crews, as well as for members of the military of South Vietnam, Ethiopia, Jordan, and Morocco. The squadron was renamed the 1st Tactical Airlift Training Squadron in 1970 and continued the training mission until inactivated in March 1973.

== Lineage ==
541st Bombardment Squadron

- Constituted as 541st Bombardment Squadron (Heavy) on 28 October 1942

Activated on 3 November 1942
Inactivated on 1 April 1944
Consolidated with 1st Tactical Airlift Training Squadron and 161st Liaison Squadron as 541st Special Operations Squadron on 19 September 1985

161st Liaison Squadron

- Constituted as the 161st Liaison Squadron on 11 May 1944

Activated on 15 May 1944
Inactivated on 14 June 1949
Consolidated with 1st Tactical Airlift Training Squadron and 541st Bombardment Squadron as 541st Special Operations Squadron on 19 September 1985

1st Tactical Airlift Training Squadron

- Constituted as the 1st Combat Crew Training Squadron on 27 June 1968

Activated on 1 July 1968
Redesignated 1st Tactical Airlift Training Squadron on 1 January 1970
Inactivated on 25 March 1973
Consolidated with 161st Liaison Squadron and 541st Bombardment Squadron as 541st Special Operations Squadron on 19 September 1985

541st Special Operations Squadron

- 1st Tactical Airlift Training Squadron, 161st Liaison Squadron and 541st Bombardment Squadron consolidated as 541st Special Operations Squadron on 19 September 1985 (not active)

=== Assignments ===
- 383d Bombardment Group, 3 November 1942 – 1 April 1944
- III Tactical Air Command, 15 May 1944
- I Tactical Air Division, 24 June 1944 (attached to Fourth Air Force after 3 May 1945)
- III Tactical Air Command, 1 September 1945 (attached to Fourth Air Force until c. 19 October 1945)
- XIX Tactical Air Command, 25 October 1945
- Tactical Air Command, 21 March 1946
- Ninth Air Force, 28 March 1946
- Caribbean Defense Command, 9 September 1946
- Caribbean Air Command, 20 September 1946 (attached to Provisional Composite Reconnaissance Group 1 February 1948)
- 5620th Group (later 5620th Composite Wing), 28 July 1948
- 5700th Air Base Group, 13–14 June 1949
- 302d Tactical Airlift Wing (later 302d Special Operations Wing, 302d Tactical Airlift Wing), 1 July 1968 – 25 March 1973

=== Stations ===
- Salt Lake City Army Air Base, Utah, 3 November 1942
- Rapid City Army Air Base, South Dakota, 12 November 1942
- Ainsworth Army Air Field, Nebraska, 13 December 1942
- Rapid City Army Air Base, South Dakota, 26 April 1943
- Geiger Field, Washington, 20 June 1943
- Peterson Field, Colorado, c. 26 October 1943 – 1 April 1944
- Statesboro Army Air Field, Georgia, 15 May 1944
- Pounds Field, Texas, 10 July 1944
- Mansfield Army Air Field, Louisiana, 30 July 1944
- Pounds Field, Texas, 30 September 1944
- Esler Field, 19 November 1944 (operated from McChord Field, Washington, May–September 1945)

Flight at Chico Army Air Field, California, May–September 1945
Flight at Geiger Field, Washington, May–September 1945
Flight at Gowen Field, idaho, May–September 1945
Flight at Portland Army Air Base, Oregon, May–September 1945

- Alexandria Army Air Field, 30 September 1945
- Biggs Field, Texas, 5 December 1945 – 9 September 1946
- Albrook Field, Panama Canal Zone, 9 September 1946
- France Field, Panama Canal Zone, 10 December 1947
- Albrook Field, Panama Canal Zone, 13–14 June 1949
- Clinton County Air Force Base, Ohio, 1 July 1968
- Rickenbacker Air Force Base, Ohio, 1 January 1970 – 25 March 1973

=== Aircraft ===
- Boeing B-17 Flying Fortress, 1943
- Stinson L-5 Sentinel, 1944-1949
- Consolidated B-24 Liberator, 1943–1944
- Fairchild AC-119 Stinger, 1968-1973
