= 880th Bombardment Squadron =

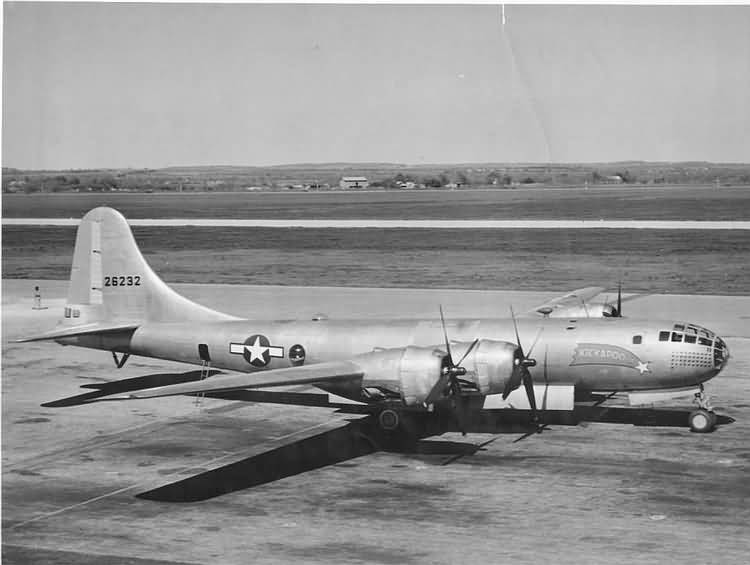
- B-29 Superfortress as flown by the 880th
- Active: 1943-1944; 1944–1946
- Country: United States
- Branch: United States Air Force
- Role: heavy bomber

The 880th Bombardment Squadron is a former United States Army Air Forces unit. It was an early Boeing B-29 Superfortress unit, but was inactivated in the spring of 1944 when the Army Air Forces reorganized its very heavy bomber units. It was reactivated in August 1944 and deployed to the Pacific in 1945, but arrived too late to see combat. The squadron returned to the United States in December and was inactivated.

== History ==
The squadron was activated at Davis-Monthan Field, Arizona in November 1943 as one of the original four squadrons of the 499th Bombardment Group. Ten days later, a cadre moved to Smoky Hill Army Air Field, Kansas to begin Boeing B-29 Superfortress very heavy bomber training. The 879th trained in Kansas with early model B-29s, with frequent delays in training due to modifications of the aircraft correcting production deficiencies. In May 1944, the Army Air Forces reorganized its very heavy bomber units, reducing them from four to three operational squadrons. The 880th was inactivated in this reorganization.

The squadron was activated again three months later at Dalhart Army Air Field, Texas, where it was assigned to the 383d Bombardment Group. Shortages of B-29s for training caused the 383d and the squadron to remain in the United States for almost a year until finally it deployed to the Central Pacific Area in August 1945. By the time the squadron arrived at West Field (Tinian) in September, hostilities in the Pacific had ended and it did not see combat. The squadron returned to the United States in December and was inactivated at the port of embarkation.

== Lineage ==
- Constituted as the 880th Bombardment Squadron, Very Heavy on 19 November 1943

Activated on 20 November 1943
Inactivated on 10 May 1944

- Activated on 28 August 1944

Inactivated on 3 January 1946

=== Assignments ===
- 499th Bombardment Group, 20 November 1943–10 May 1944
- 383d Bombardment Group, 28 August 1944 – 3 January 1946

=== Stations ===
- Davis-Monthan Field, Arizona, 20 November 1943
- Smoky Hill Army Air Field, Kansas, 1 December 1943
- Clovis Army Air Field, New Mexico, 11 February 1944
- Smoky Hill Army Air Field, Kansas, 8 April–10 May 1944
- Dalhart Army Air Field, Texas, 28 August 1944
- Walker Army Air Field, Kansas, 14 January–11 August 1945
- West Field (Tinian), Mariana Islands, 12 September–19 Dec 1945
- Camp Anza, California, 2–3 January 1946

=== Aircraft ===
- Boeing B-17 Flying Fortress, 1944
- B-29 Superfortress, 1944, 1945

=== Campaigns ===
Campaign Streamer	Campaign	Dates	Notes
	American Theater without inscription	20 November 1943-10 May 1944, 28 August 1944-14 August 1945	
	Asiatic–Pacific Theater without inscription	2 September 1945-14 December 1945	

== See also ==
- B-17 Flying Fortress units of the United States Army Air Forces
- List of B-29 Superfortress operators
