= 500th Air Expeditionary Group =

500th Air Expeditionary Group

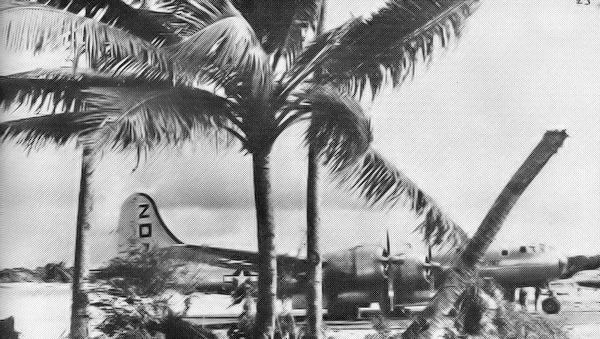
- Group B-29 on its parking ramp, Saipan, 1945
- Active: 1943–1946; 1963–1964; short periods since 2002
- Country: United States
- Branch: United States Air Force
- Role: Expeditionary operations
- Part of: Air Mobility Command
- Motto: Semper Paratus (Latin for 'Always Prepared')
- Engagements: Pacific Ocean theater of World War II
- Decorations: Distinguished Unit Citation

Insignia
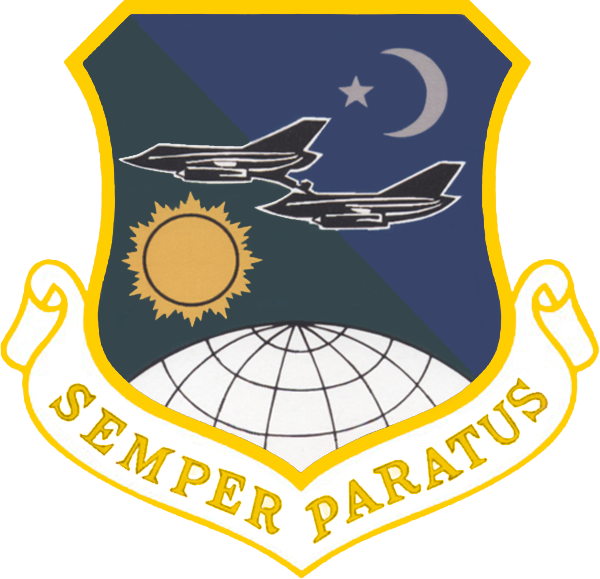
- 500th Air Refueling Wing emblem (Note: Approved 19 February 1964.)
- World War II tail code: Square Z

The 500th Air Expeditionary Group is a provisional United States Air Force unit. Its last known assignment was at Christchurch, New Zealand, where it was activated for the summer 2005–2006 season.

The unitwas firstr organized as the 500th Bombardment Group, which was part of Twentieth Air Force during World War II. The 500th engaged in very heavy (Boeing B-29 Superfortress) bombardment operations against Japan. It was awarded two Distinguished Unit Citations for actions in 1945.

The 500th Air Refueling Wing replaced the 4045th Air Refueling Wing as a Strategic Air Command tanker unit at Selfridge Air Force Base, Michigan on 1 January 1963. The two units were consolidated in 1984.

In 2002, the consolidated unit was converted to provisional status as the 500th Air Expeditionary Group. It has been activated several times to support operations in Antarctica.

== History ==
=== World War II ===
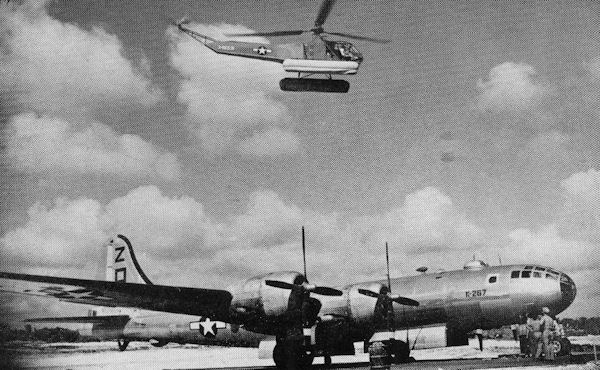
Rare photo of a World War II USAAF Helicopter ferrying parts to a 500th Bomb Group B-29 on its hardstand, Saipan, 1945

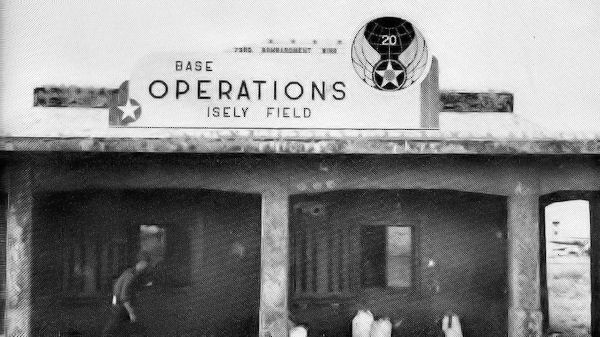
Base Operations, Isely Field, Saipan, 1945

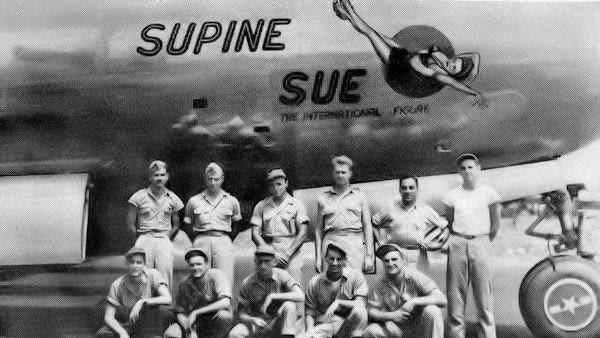
"Supine Sue", first B-29 on Saipan, November 1944

The group was established as the 500th Bombardment Group in late 1943 at Gowen Field, Idaho. It was formed as a Boeing B-29 Superfortress very heavy bombardment group. The unit was initially composed of four bombardment squadrons, the 881st, 882d, 883d, and 884th Bombardment Squadrons, the 29th, 30th, 31st and 32d Bombardment Maintenance Squadrons and the 18th Photographic Laboratory (Bombardment, Very Heavy).

Due to a shortage of B-29s, the group was equipped with Boeing B-17 Flying Fortresses already at Gowen Field. These aircraft were previously used for training heavy bomber replacement personnel. In January the unit moved to Clovis Army Air Field, New Mexico due to the poor flying weather during the winter in Idaho. It moved to Walker Army Air Field, Kansas in April 1944 where it finally received newly manufactured B-29 Superfortresses from the Boeing plant at Wichita, Kansas. In May the United States Army Air Forces reconfigured its very heavy groups and the 884th Bombardment Squadron and the Bombardment Maintenance Squadrons were inactivated. Their personnel were consolidated into the remaining squadrons. (Note: The 884th was reactivated a month later as part of the 383d Bombardment Group.)

The 500th deployed to the Pacific Theater of Operations in September 1944, where it was assigned to the 73d Bombardment Wing of XXI Bomber Command in the Northern Mariana Islands, at Isely Field, Saipan. Upon their arrival the group's personnel engaged in Quonset hut construction. By mid-October most personnel were able to move into the huts from the tents which they were assigned to on their arrival in theater. The 500th's assigned tail code was a Z-Square. It entered combat on 11 November 1944 with an attack against a submarine base in the Truk Islands.

On 24 November, the 500th participated in the first attack on Japan by B-29's based in the Marianas. After that attack, the group conducted many daylight raids, operating from high altitude to bomb strategic targets in Japan. It struck the Mitsubishi aircraft engine plant at Nagoya in January 1945 and received a Distinguished Unit Citation (DUC) for the mission. The group bombed enemy airfields and other installations on Kyūshū in support of the Allied assault on Okinawa in April 1945.

Beginning in March 1945, the group flew missions at night and at low altitude to drop incendiaries on area targets in Japan. It received a second DUC for incendiary attacks on the urban-industrial section of Osaka, feeder industries at Hamamatsu, and shipping and rail targets on Kyūshū during June. The group released propaganda leaflets over the Japanese home islands in July and August, continuing strategic bombing raids and incendiary attacks until the Japanese capitulation in August 1945.

After V-J Day, the 500th dropped supplies to Allied prisoners, participated in show-of-force missions, and flew over Japan to evaluate bombardment damage. In October 1945 the unit returned to the United States. It was assigned to Continental Air Forces' Fourth Air Force at March Field, California. However demobilization was in full swing and the group was inactivated on 17 January 1946.

=== Cold War ===
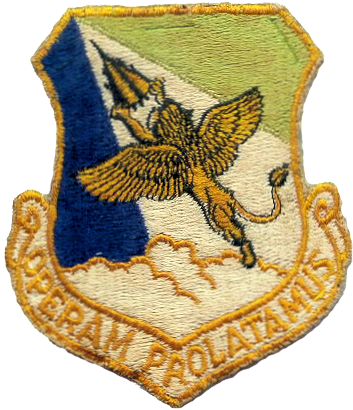
4045th Air Refueling Wing Patch

The 500th Air Refueling Wing was activated and established in 1963 as part of Strategic Air Command at Selfridge AFB, Michigan. The wing replaced the 4045th Air Refueling Wing at Selfridge, absorbing its personnel and assets.

The 4045th Wing had been established at Selfridge on 1 January 1959, along with three maintenance squadrons and a security unit and assigned to Second Air Force. The 44th Air Refueling Squadron and 307th Air Refueling Squadron moved from Chennault Air Force Base, Louisiana in June 1960 and were assigned to the wing as its operational squadrons. In September, the wing was reassigned to the 17th Air Division.

In 1962, in order to perpetuate the lineage of many currently inactive bombardment units with illustrious World War II records, Headquarters SAC received authority from Headquarters USAF to discontinue its Major Command controlled (MAJCON) wings that were equipped with tactical aircraft and to activate Air Force controlled (AFCON) units, most of which were inactive at the time which could carry a lineage and history. (Note: MAJCON units could not carry a permanent history or lineage. Ravenstein, Charles A. (1984). A Guide to Air Force Lineage and Honors (2d, Revised ed.). Maxwell AFB, AL: USAF Historical Research Center. p. 12..) As a result, the 4045th was replaced by the newly constituted 500th Air Refueling Wing on 1 January 1963. (Note: Although the 500th Wing was a new organization, it continued, through temporary bestowal, the history, and honors of the World War II 500th Bombardment Group. It was also entitled to retain the honors (but not the history or lineage) of the 4045th. This temporary bestowal ended in January 1984, when the wing and group were consolidated into a single unit.)

The two refueling squadrons were reassigned to the 500th wing. The 4045th's maintenance and security squadrons were replaced by ones with the 500th numerical designation of the newly established wing. Each of the new units assumed the personnel, equipment, and mission of its predecessor. The wing was reassigned to the 40th Air Division on 1 July 1963.

The wing supported SAC bombardment and Tactical Air Command fighter aircraft with air refueling and occasionally deployed segments of its tanker force overseas to support unit movements and special operations. The unit was discontinued and inactivated on 15 December 1964. The two units were consolidated in 1984.

=== Expeditionary Operations ===
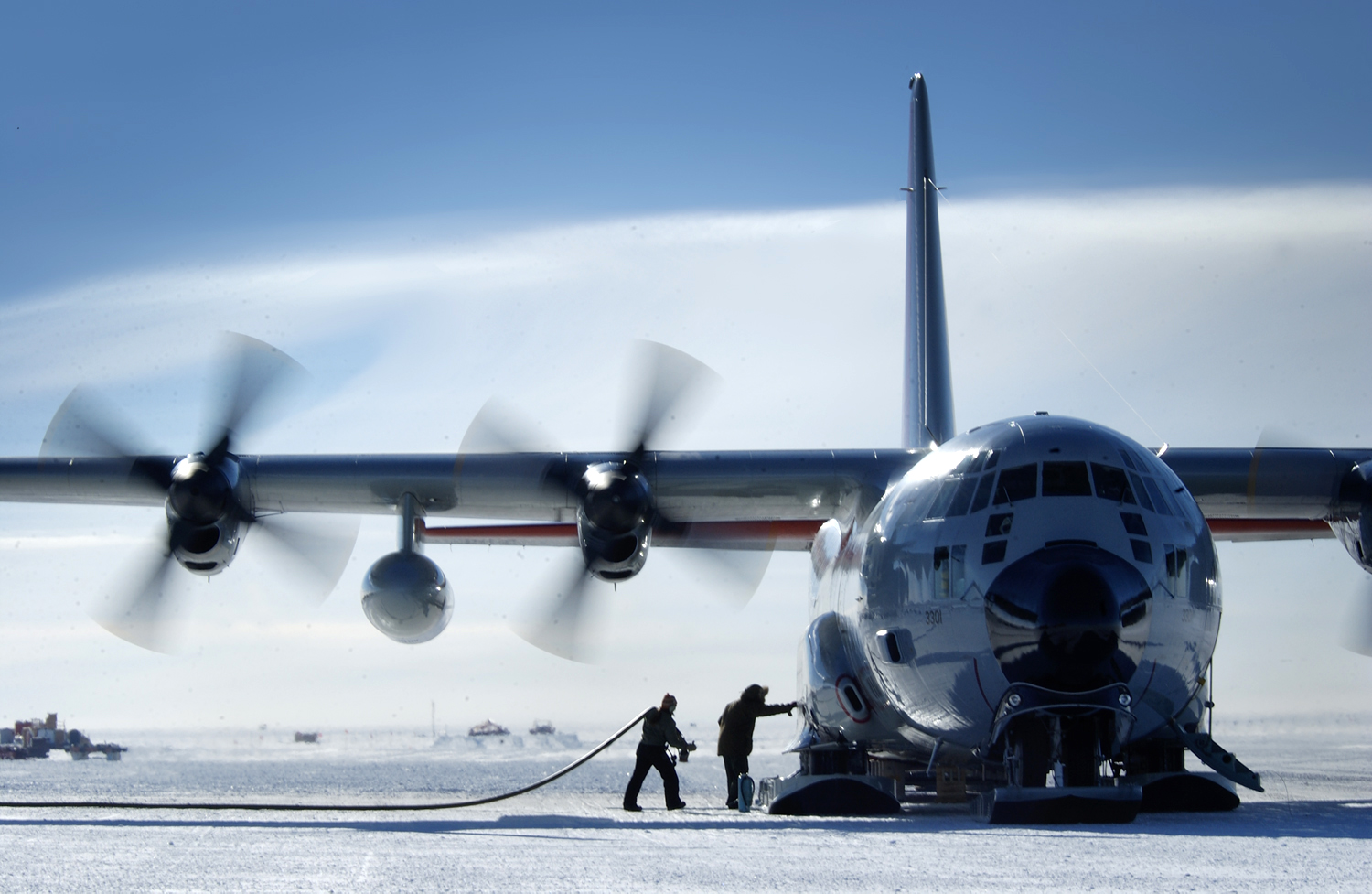
LC-130 of the New York Air National Guard onloading fuel and cargo for an Antarctic mission

The consolidated unit was redesignated as the 500th Air Expeditionary Group and activated in 2003 to conduct Operation Deep Freeze activities under Pacific Air Forces, before being replaced by the 13th Air Expeditionary Group. During deployments to support Deep Freeze, the group had controlled ski-equipped Lockheed LC-130 Hercules aircraft of the 139th Expeditionary Airlift Squadron and McDonnell Douglas C-17 Globemaster III aircraft of the 304th Expeditionary Airlift Squadron.

== Lineage ==
500th Bombardment Group

- Constituted as 500th Bombardment Group, Very Heavy on 19 November 1943

Activated on 20 November 1943
Inactivated on 17 January 1946

- Consolidated with 500th Air Refueling Wing as 500th Air Refueling Wing on 31 January 1984 (remained inactive)

500th Air Expeditionary Group

- Established as 500th Air Refueling Wing on 15 November 1962

Activated on 15 November 1962 (not organized)
Organized on 1 January 1963
Discontinued and inactivated, 15 December 1964

- Consolidated with 500th Bombardment Group on 31 January 1984 (remained inactive)
- Redesignated 500th Air Expeditionary Group and converted to provisional status on 12 June 2002

Activated on 15 August 2003
Inactivated on 1 March 2004
Activated on 15 August 2004
Inactivated on 28 February 2005
Activated on 19 July 2005
Inactivated unknown (probably February 2006).

=== Assignments ===
- Second Air Force, 20 November 1943 – 23 July 1944 (attached to 17th Bombardment Operational Training Wing), 16 April – 23 July 1944
- 73d Bombardment Wing, 18 September 1944 – 21 October 1945
- Fifteenth Air Force, 24 October 1945 – 17 January 1946
- Strategic Air Command, 15 November 1962 (not organized)
- 17th Strategic Aerospace Division, 1 June 1963
- 40th Air Division, 1 July 1963 – 15 December 1964
- Air Mobility Command to activate or inactivate as needed, 12 June 2002

attached to Support Forces, Antarctica, 15 August 2003 – 1 March 2004
attached to Support Forces, Antarctica, 15 August 2004 – 28 February 2005
500th Aerospace Expeditionary Task Force, 29 July 2005 – unknown

=== Components ===
Tactical Squadrons

- 139th Expeditionary Airlift Squadron
- 304th Expeditionary Airlift Squadron
- 44th Air Refueling Squadron, 1 January 1963 – 15 December 1964 (detached 10 July 1963 – 10 October 1963)
- 307th Air Refueling Squadron, 1 January 1963 – 15 December 1964 (detached 31 July 1963 – 5 October 1963)
- 881st Bombardment Squadron, 20 November 1943 – 17 January 1946
- 882d Bombardment Squadron, 20 November 1943 – 17 January 1946
- 883d Bombardment Squadron, 20 November 1943 – 17 January 1946
- 884th Bombardment Squadron, 20 November 1943 – 10 May 1944

Support Units

- 29th Bombardment Maintenance Squadron, 20 November 1943 – 10 May 1944
- 30th Bombardment Maintenance Squadron, 20 November 1943 – 10 May 1944
- 31st Bombardment Maintenance Squadron, 20 November 1943 – 10 May 1944
- 32d Bombardment Maintenance Squadron, 20 November 1943 – 10 May 1944
- 18th Photographic Laboratory, 20 November 1943 – c. 17 January 1946

=== Stations ===
- Gowen Field, Idaho, 20 November 1943 – 12 January 1944
- Clovis Army Air Field, New Mexico, 12 January – 16 April 1944
- Walker Army Air Field, Kansas, 16 April – 23 July 1944
- Isely Field, Saipan, Mariana Islands, 18 September 1944 – 21 October 1945
- March Field, California, 24 October 1945 – 17 January 1946
- Selfridge AFB, Michigan, 1 January 1963 – 15 December 1964
- Christchurch, New Zealand, 15 August 2003 – 1 March 2004
- Christchurch, New Zealand, 15 August 2004 – 28 February 2005
- Christchurch, New Zealand, 29 July 2005 – unknown

=== Aircraft ===
- Boeing B-29 Superfortress, 1943–1946
- Boeing KC-97 Stratofreighter, 1963–1964
