= 6023d Radar Evaluation Squadron =

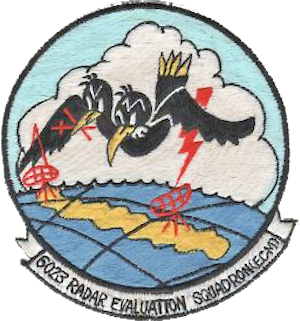
- Emblem of the 6023d Radar Evaluation Squadron
- Active: 1952–1960
- Country: United States
- Branch: United States Air Force
- Type: Radar Evaluation

The 6023d Radar Evaluation Squadron is an inactive United States Air Force unit. It was last assigned to the 41st Air Division, stationed at Naha Air Base, Okinawa. The unit was inactivated on 31 July 1960.

== History ==
The unit's mission was to fly evaluation flights against new ground surveillance air defense radar installations. It also evaluated proposed radar (fixed and mobile) and perform intruder tests against operating Aircraft Control and Warning (AC&W) sites. It also provided training to ground radar sites. It was the last USAF operator of B-29 Superfortresses, and the unit at times had to curtail flights due to high out-of-commission rate of aircraft, which were supported by cannibalization of spare parts from non-flying aircraft kept in storage in the United States.

Squadron inactivated in July 1960 after last USAF B-29 flight on 21 June 1960. Aircraft could no longer be reliably supported due to lack of logistics support.

=== Lineage ===
- Established as 10th Radar Evaluation Flight (Electronic Countermeasures), and activated on 21 March 1952

Re-designated: 6023d Radar Evaluation Flight, 18 March 1954
Re-designated: 6023d Radar Evaluation Squadron, 1 January 1959
Inactivated on 31 July 1960

=== Assignments ===
- Fifth Air Force, 21 March 1952

Attached to: 6007th Composite Reconnaissance Group, 18 March 1954-3 July 1956

- 41st Air Division, 3 July 1956 – 31 July 1960

Attached to 51st Air Base Group, 1 July 1958-31 July 1960

=== Stations ===
- Yokota Air Base, Japan, 21 March 1952
- Johnson Air Base, Japan, 3 July 1956
- Naha Air Base, Japan, 1 July 1958 – 31 July 1960

=== Aircraft ===
- ECM TB-29 Superfortress, 1952-1960
