= 383d Bombardment Group =

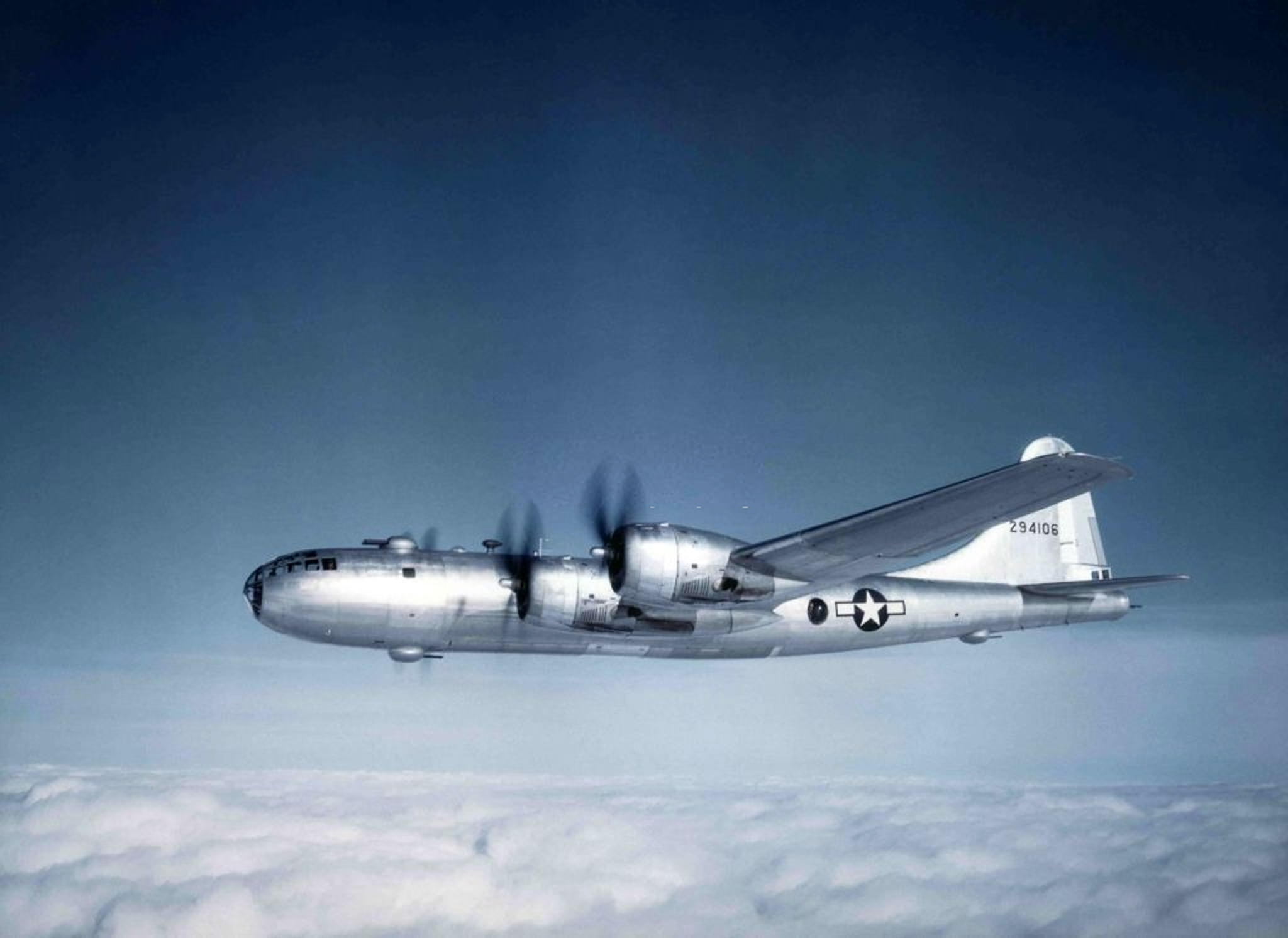
- B-29 Bomber on a long range mission in late 1945 (Note: Aircraft is Boeing B-29A-30-BN Superfortress, serial 42-94106.)
- Active: 1942–1944; 1944–1946
- Country: United States
- Branch: United States Air Force
- Role: Heavy bomber
- Engagements: Pacific Ocean Theater of World War II

The 383d Bombardment Group is a former United States Army Air Forces unit. It was last stationed at Camp Anza, California, where it was inactivated on 4 January 1946. The group was active from 1942 to 1944 as a heavy bomber training unit. It was reorganized as a very heavy bomber unit and trained for deployment overseas. However, it arrived at its overseas station too late to see combat, and returned to the United States, where it was inactivated.

== History ==
=== Heavy bomber training unit ===
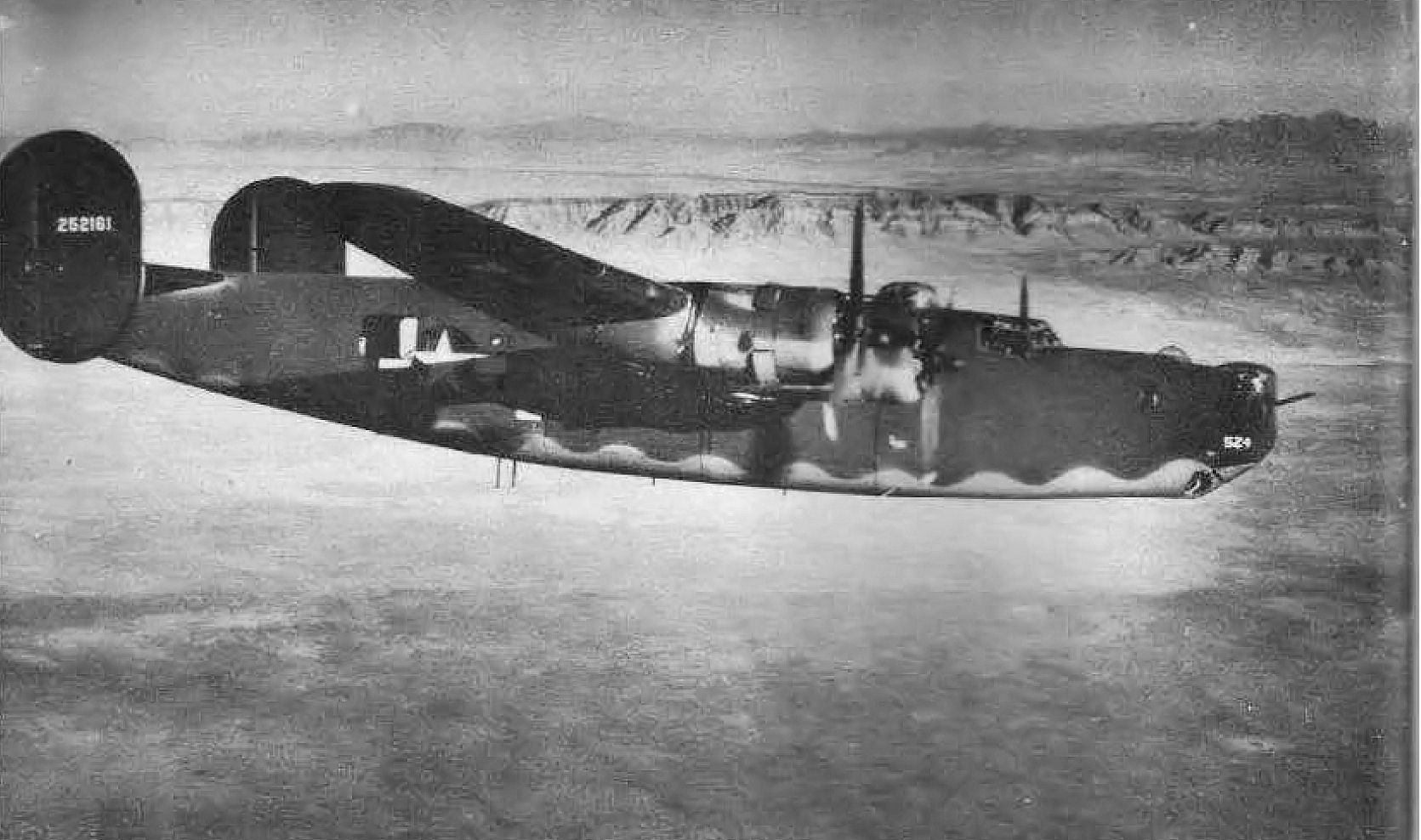
B-24 Liberator of a training unit in the southwest

The group was first activated at Salt Lake City Army Air Base in November 1942, with the 540th, 541st, 542d and 543d Bombardment Squadrons assigned. Its cadre moved to Rapid City Army Air Base a little over a week later, where it began to equip as a Boeing B-17 Flying Fortress Operational Training Unit (OTU) the following year. OTUs were oversized parent units that provided cadres to "satellite groups"

In October 1943, the group moved to Peterson Field, Colorado, where it flew Consolidated B-24 Liberator and changed its mission to become a Replacement Training Unit (RTU). Like OTUs, RTUs were oversized units, but their mission was to train individual aircrews. However, the AAF was finding that standard military units like the 383d, which were based on relatively inflexible tables of organization were not well adapted to the training mission. Accordingly, it adopted a more functional system in which each base was organized into a separate numbered unit, which was manned and equipped for the specific training mission. As a result, the 383d Group, its elements and supporting units were inactivated or disbanded and replaced by the 214th AAF Base Unit (Combat Crew Training School, Heavy), which was simultaneously organized at Peterson.

=== B-29 operations ===
However, the unit was reactivated on 28 August as the 383d Bombardment Group, Very Heavy and programmed as a Boeing B-29 Superfortress group for the Pacific Theater at Dalhart Army Air Field, Texas. Shortages of B-29s for training caused the group to remain in the United States for almost a year until finally it deployed to Okinawa in August 1945 to be part of Eighth Air Force in the Pacific. However, the war ended before the group could enter combat.

The group was reassigned to Twentieth Air Force in September 1945, the group flew a few training missions from Okinawa until being returned to the United States for demobilization in December.

The 383d Bomb Group was inactivated on 3 January 1946.

== Lineage ==
- Constituted as the 383d Bombardment Group (Heavy)' on 28 October 1942

Activated on 3 November 1942
Inactivated on 1 April 1944

- Redesignated 383d Bombardment Group, Very Heavy

Activated on 28 August 1944
Inactivated on 3 January 1946

=== Assignments ===
- II Bomber Command, 3 November 1942 – 1 April 1944 (attached to 17th Bombardment Operational Training Wing 12 November 1942 – c. 26 October 1943)
- II Bomber Command, 28 August 1944 (attached to 17th Bombardment Operational Training Wing)
- 313th Bombardment Wing, 12 September 1945
- Unknown 19 December 1945 – 3 January 1946

=== Stations ===
- Salt Lake City Army Air Base, Utah, 3 November 1942
- Rapid City Army Air Base, South Dakota, 12 November 1942
- Geiger Field, Washington, 20 June 1943
- Peterson Field, Colorado 26 October 1943 – 1 April 1944
- Dalhart Army Air Field, Texas 28 August 1944
- Walker Army Air Field, Kansas 14 January–11 August 1945
- Tinian, Mariana Islands, 12 September–19 December 1945
- Camp Anza, California 2–3 January 1946

=== Components ===
- 540th Bombardment Squadron, 3 November 1942 – 1 April 1944
- 541st Bombardment Squadron, 3 November 1942 – 1 April 1944
- 542d Bombardment Squadron, 3 November 1942 – 1 April 1944
- 543d Bombardment Squadron, 3 November 1942 – 1 April 1944
- 876th Bombardment Squadron, 28 August 1944 – 29 December 1945
- 880th Bombardment Squadron, 28 August 1944 – 3 January 1946
- 884th Bombardment Squadron, 28 August 1944 – 29 December 1945
- 38th Photographic Laboratory, 28 August 1944 – 3 January 1946

=== Aircraft flown ===
- Boeing B-17 Flying Fortress
- Consolidated B-24 Liberator
- Boeing B-29 Superfortress
