= 421st =

421st may refer to:

- 421st Air Refueling Squadron, inactive United States Air Force unit
- 421st Assault Aviation Regiment, original name of the Yugoslav 107th Mixed Aviation Regiment
- 421st Bombardment Squadron, inactive United States Air Force unit
- 421st Fighter Squadron (421 FS), part of the 388th Fighter Wing at Hill Air Force Base, Utah

== See also ==
- 421 (number)
- 421, the year 421 (CDXXI) of the Julian calendar
- 421 BC
