= 415th Bombardment Group =

415th Bombardment Group (later 415th Tactical Missile Wing)
- Active: 1943–1944
- Country: United States
- Branch: United States Air Force
- Role: light bomber training and operational testing
- Engagements: American Theater of World War II

The 415th Bombardment Group is an inactive United States Air Force unit that served primarily as a training and demonstration unit. It was last part of Second Air Force, at Dalhart Army Air Field, Texas, where it was disbanded on 5 April 1944. In July 1985, the group was reconstituted as the 415th Tactical Missile Wing, but has not been active as a missile unit.

== History ==
The 415th Bombardment Group was activated during World War II as a Third Air Force training and demonstration unit as part of the Army Air Force School of Applied Tactics. It was equipped with A-20s, A-24s, A-26s, B-25s, and P-39s. The group was reassigned to Second Air Force in early 1944 as a B-17 Flying Fortress replacement training unit. It was inactivated in early 1944 when the need for B-17 aircrews diminished.

The 415th was reconstituted in inactive status as the 415th Tactical Missile Wing on 31 July 1985.

== Lineage ==
- Constituted as the 415th Bombardment Group (Light) on 12 February 1943

Activated on 15 February 1943
Disbanded on 5 April 1944

- Reconstituted as the 415th Tactical Missile Wing on 31 July 1985

=== Assignments ===
- Army Air Force School of Applied Tactics, 15 February 1943
- II Bomber Command, 19 March–5 April 1944

=== Components ===
- 465th Bombardment Squadron: 23 March 1943 – 5 April 1944
- 521st Fighter-Bomber (formerly 667th) Bombardment Squadron: 15 February 1943 – 5 April 1944

=== Stations ===
- Alachua Army Airfield, Florida, 15 February 1943
- Orlando Army Air Base, Florida, 25 February 1944
- Dalhart Army Air Field, Texas, 19 March–5 April 1944
