= 507th =

507th may refer to:

- 507th Air Refueling Wing, a wing of the United States Air Force based out of Tinker Air Force Base, Oklahoma
- 507th Bombardment Squadron, an inactive United States Air Force unit
- 507th Infantry Regiment (United States), an airborne forces regiment of the US Army
- 507th Maintenance Company, a unit of the US Army which provided maintenance support to 5th Battalion, 52nd Air Defense Artillery at Fort Bliss, Texas

== See also ==
- 507 (number)
- 507, the year 507 (DVII) of the Julian calendar
- 507 BC
