= 504th Bombardment Group =

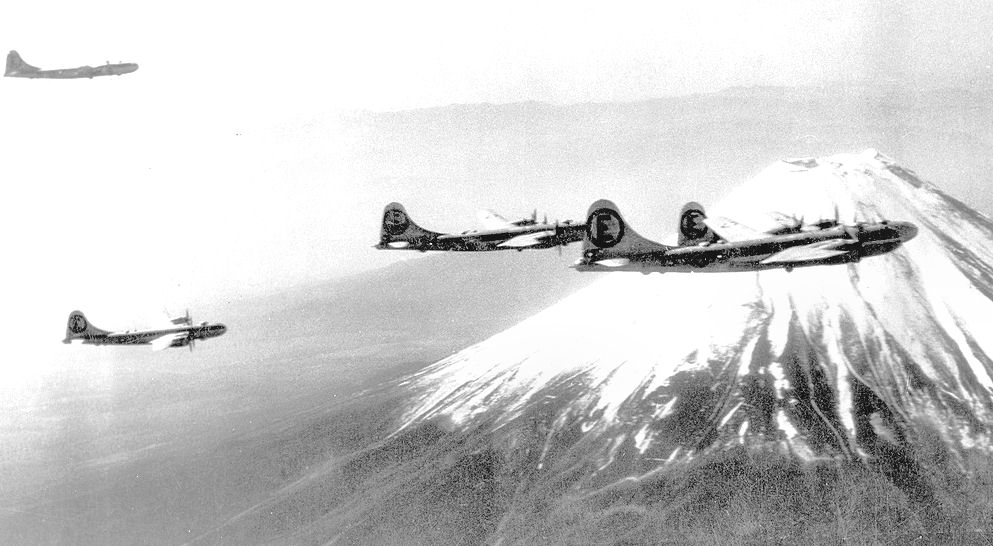
- 504th Bombardment Group B-29 Superfortress formation over Mount Fuji in 1945
- Active: 1944–1946
- Country: United States
- Branch: United States Air Force
- Role: Bombardment
- Motto: Quem Virtutem Imperant (Latin for 'Those Who Are Virtuous Command')
- Engagements: Japan Campaign
- Decorations: Distinguished Unit Citation

Insignia
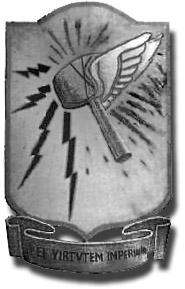
- 504th Bombardment Group emblem

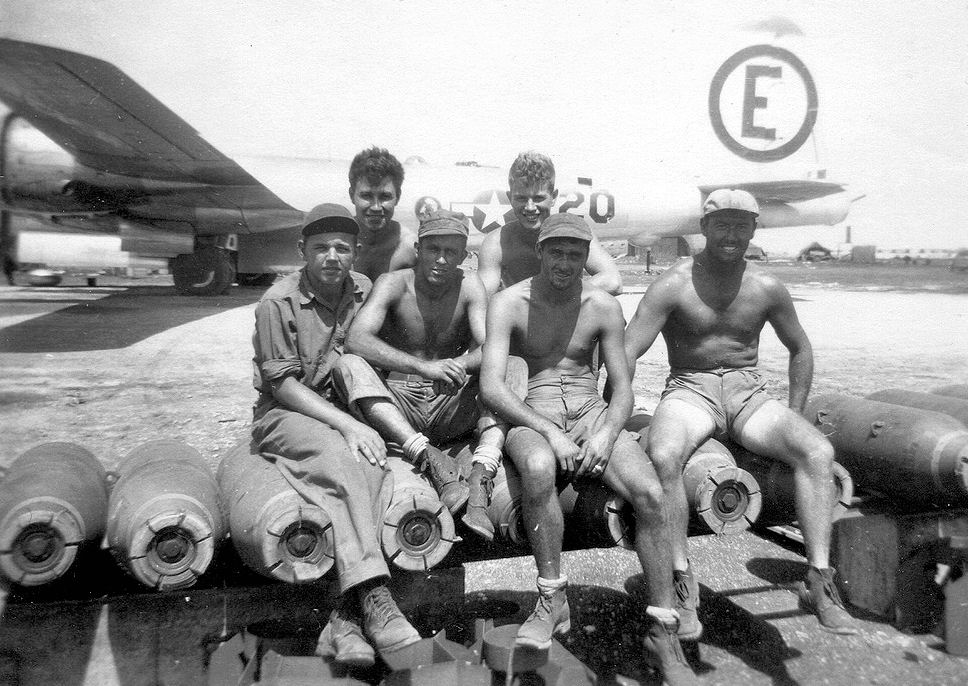
504th Bombardment Group bomb loaders 1945

The 504th Bombardment Group was a World War II United States Army Air Forces combat organization.

The unit served primarily in the Central Pacific Area as part of Twentieth Air Force. The 504th Bomb Group's aircraft engaged in B-29 Superfortress bombardment operations against Japan. Its aircraft were identified by a "E" inside a Circle painted on the tail.

The 504th Bombardment Group flew the last combat mission by the United States Army Air Forces of World War II, its last combat mission being on 15 August 1945. It was inactivated on 15 June 1946.

== History ==
The unit was established in early 1944 at Dalhart Army Air Field, Texas, being formed as a Boeing B-29 Superfortress very heavy bombardment group. The unit was initially formed with four bomb squadrons (393d, 398th, 421st, and 507th Bombardment Squadrons), being a mixture of both newly constituted and reassigned units. The 398th was formerly a III Bomber Command North American B-25 Mitchell medium bomber Operational Training Unit in the southeastern United States, being formed in 1942. It later became a Martin B-26 Marauder Replacement Training Unit until being inactivated in October 1943.

Due to a shortage of B-29s, the group was initially equipped with II Bomber Command Boeing B-17 Flying Fortresses previously used for training heavy bomber replacement personnel. The unit was then reassigned for advanced training and received B-29s at Fairmont Army Air Field, Nebraska during the late spring and summer of 1944.

In May, B-29 groups were reorganized to have three, rather than four squadrons, and the 507th Squadron was inactivated, with its personnel being consolidated into other group squadrons (the 507th would be reactivated a month later as part of the 333d Bombardment Group). In November, the 393d Bombardment Squadron was reassigned to the 509th Composite Group at Wendover Field, Utah, leaving the 504th to be a two squadron group. The 393d became the 509th's only operational B-29 squadron. The 393d would eventually become the only military unit in history to engage in nuclear warfare, dropping Atomic Bombs on Hiroshima and Nagasaki, Japan, in August 1945.

As a two squadron group, the 504th was deployed to Pacific Theater of Operations in late 1944, being assigned to the XXI Bomber Command 313th Bombardment Wing in the Northern Mariana Islands; being stationed at North Field, Tinian. The group began combat operations from Tinian in January 1945 with attacks on Japanese airfields and other installations on Maug and Iwo Jima and in the Truk Islands. Flew its first mission against the Japanese home islands early in February 1945 when the group bombed the industrial area of Kobe. Continued to attack strategic targets in Japan, operating in daylight and at high altitude to bomb such objectives as aircraft factories, chemical plants, harbors, and arsenals. Switched to night incendiary raids attacking major Japanese cities in the spring of 1945, causing massive destruction of urbanized areas.

Received a Distinguished Unit Citation (DUC) for striking the industrial center at Yokohama late in May 1945. Began incendiary raids in March 1945, flying at night and at low altitude to strike area targets in Japan. Started mining operations against enemy shipping late in Mar, receiving a second DUC for mining Korean shipping lanes, the Shimonoseki Strait, and harbors of the Inland Sea, July–August 1945. In April and May 1945 the group hit airfields from which the Japanese launched kamikaze planes against the invasion force during the assault on Okinawa. During mid June 1945 the 680th Bomb Squadron was attached to the 504th bomb group to bring the group up to full strength with 3 squadrons. The group continued strategic bombing raids and incendiary attacks until the Japanese Capitulation in August 1945.

After V-J Day, the 504th dropped supplies to Allied prisoners, participated in show-of-force missions, and flew over Japan to evaluate bombardment damage. In the fall of 1945, the group largely demobilized as part of the "Sunset Project", with some aircraft being sent reclamation on Tinian; others being returned to the United States for storage at aircraft depots in the southwest. By Christmas, the group fleet was reduced to 30 or less planes Many of the remaining veterans signed for "any conditions of travel" to get home, arriving three weeks later in Oakland, California, where troop trains scattered them for points of discharge close to their homes.

The unit was largely a paper organization when it was reassigned to Clark Field in the Philippines in March 1946, and assigned to Thirteenth Air Force. At Clark its remaining aircraft and personnel were consolidated into other units, and it was inactivated in June.

=== Lineage ===
- Constituted as the 504th Bombardment Group, Very Heavy on 18 February 1944

Activated on 11 March 1944
Inactivated on 15 June 1946

=== Assignments ===
- Second Air Force, 11 March-5 November 1944

Attached to 17th Bombardment Operational Training Wing (Very Heavy), 12 March-5 November 1944

- 313th Bombardment Wing, 23 December 1944
- Thirteenth Air Force, 6 March – 15 June 1946

=== Components ===
- 393d Bombardment Squadron: 11 March-25 November 1944
- 398th Bombardment Squadron: 11 March 1944 – 15 June 1946
- 421st Bombardment Squadron: 11 March 1944 – 15 June 1946
- 507th Bombardment Squadron: 11 March-10 May 1944
- 680th Bombardment Squadron: Attached, 15 June 1945; assigned 14 November 1945 – 15 June 1946
- 20th Photographic Laboratory Squadron

=== Stations ===
- Dalhart Army Air Field, Texas, 11 March 1944
- Fairmont Army Air Field, Nebraska, 12 March-5 November 1944
- North Field, Tinian, Mariana Islands, 23 December 1944
- Clark Field, Luzon, Philippines, 13 March – 15 June 1946

=== Aircraft ===
- Boeing B-17 Flying Fortress, 1944 (Training only)
- Boeing B-29 Superfortress, 1944–1946
