= 460th Bombardment Squadron =

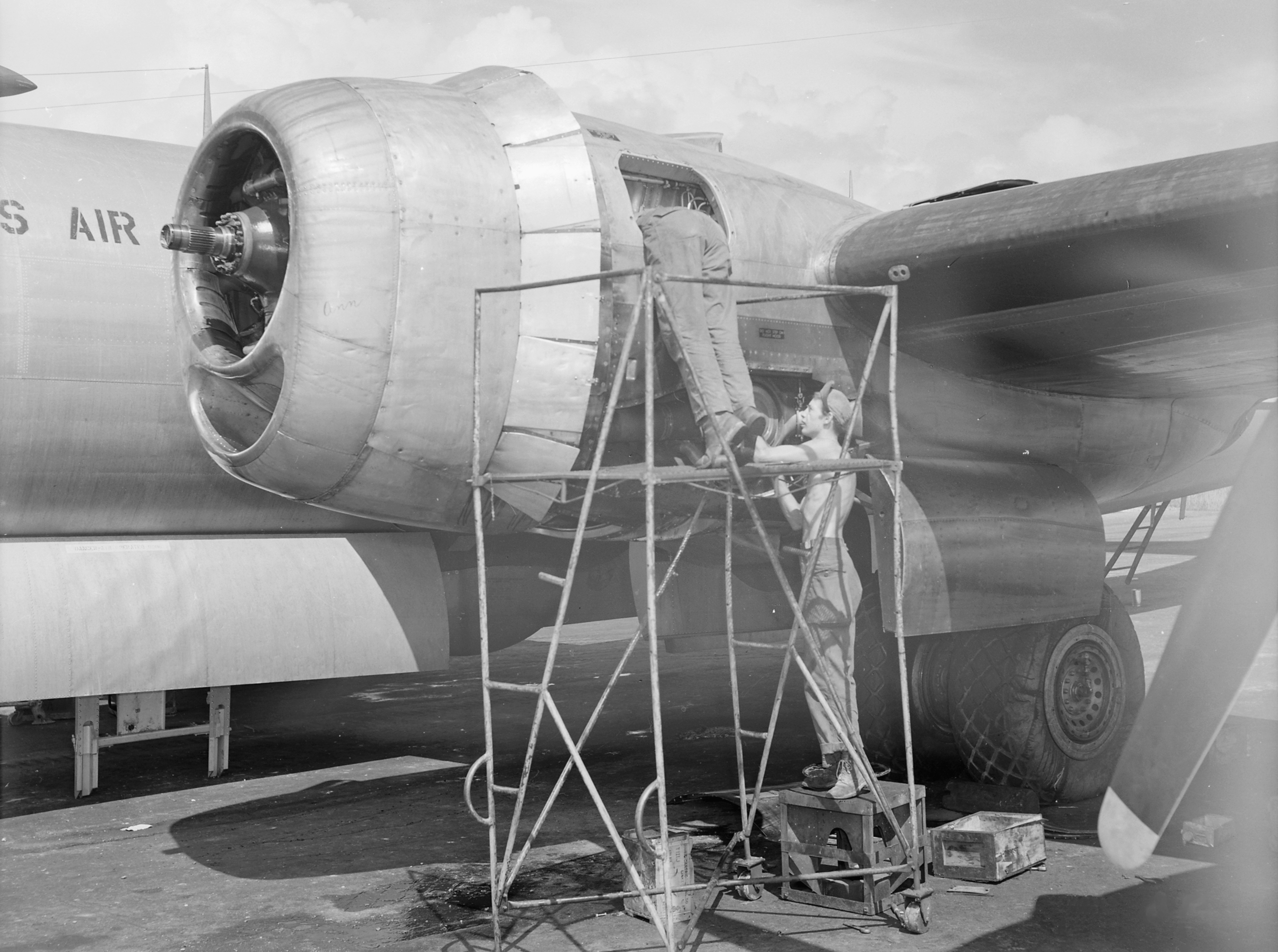
- Maintenance on a B-29 Superfortress at Kadena Air Base
- Active: 1942–1944; 1944; 1944–1946
- Country: United States
- Branch: United States Air Force
- Role: Bombardment
- Engagements: Pacific Theater

Insignia
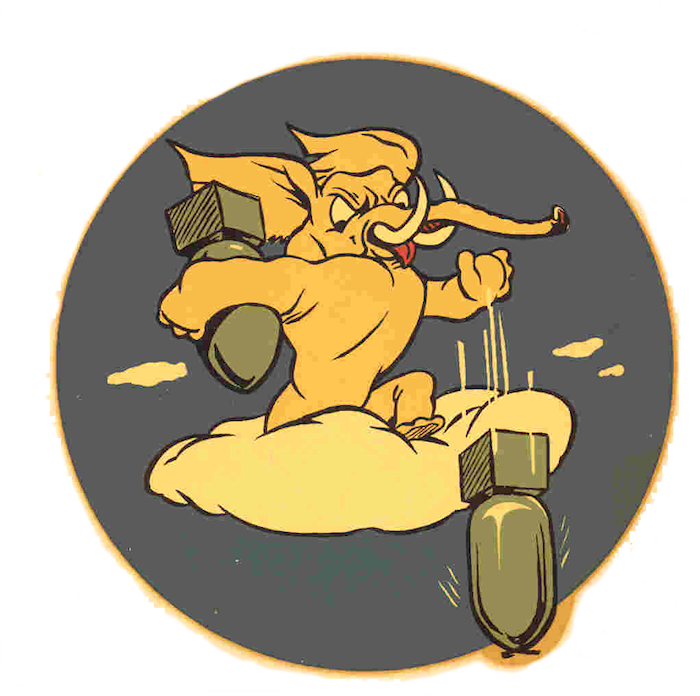
- 460th Bombardment Squadron emblem (Note: Approved 17 April 1945. Description: On an ultramarine blue disc, a caricatured yellow orange ferocious elephant, trimmed red and black, with white tusks, standing on hind legs on a white cloud formation, edged black, facing toward sinister holding a large grayed light green aerial bomb under the right foreleg, and hurling, palewise, a like [colored] aerial bomb toward sinister base, leaving white speed lines to rear)

The 460th Bombardment Squadron was a unit of the United States Army Air Forces. From 1942 to 1944, it was a heavy bomber training unit, and was inactivated in a general reorganization of Army Air Forces support organizations. It was then assigned to the 333d Bombardment Group and trained with Boeing B-29 Superfortresses. It deployed to Kadena Air Base, Okinawa in 1945, but arrived in the combat theater too late to participate in the war. It was inactivated on 28 May 1946.

== History ==
=== Bombardment training unit ===
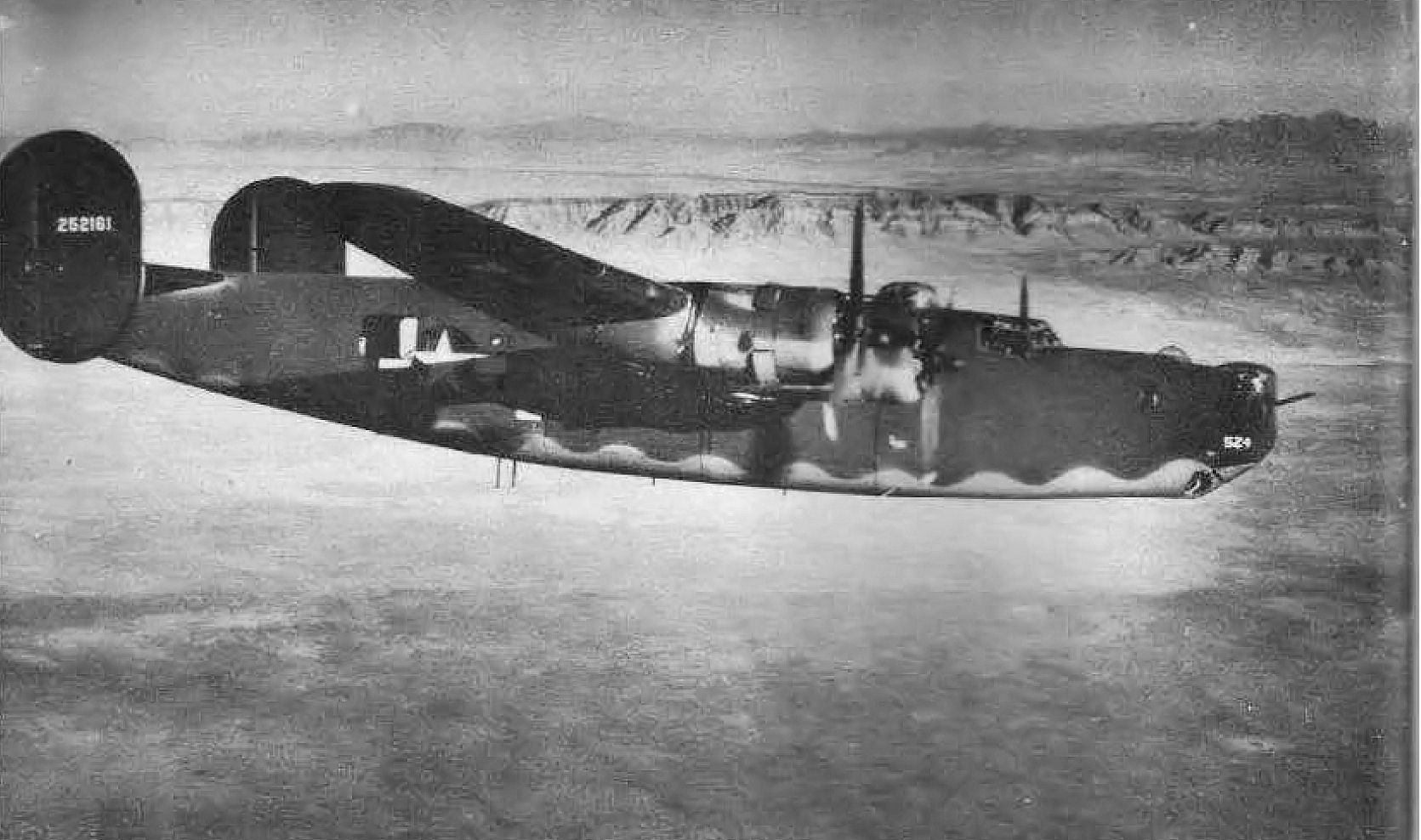
B-24 Liberator 42-52161 from Alamogordo Army Airfield (Note: Aircraft is Ford Motors built Consolidated B-24H-10-FO Liberator, serial 42-52161. It later deployed to Europe and was shot down on 22 February 1944. Missing Aircrew Report 2832.)

The squadron was first activated at Salt Lake City Army Air Base, Utah on 6 July 1942 as one of the original four squadrons of the 330th Bombardment Group. Although equipped early on with some Boeing B-17 Flying Fortresses, it became a Consolidated B-24 Liberator Operational Training Unit (OTU), moving to Biggs Field, Texas by early September. The OTU program was patterned after the unit training system of the Royal Air Force and involved the use of an oversized parent unit to provide cadres to "satellite groups" It then assumed responsibility for their training and oversaw their expansion with graduates of Army Air Forces Training Command schools to become effective combat units. Phase I training concentrated on individual training in crewmember specialties. Phase II training emphasized the coordination for the crew to act as a team. The final phase concentrated on operation as a unit.

By early 1944 most units had been activated and almost three quarters of them had deployed overseas. With the exception of special programs, like forming Boeing B-29 Superfortress units, training “fillers” for existing units became more important than unit training. The squadron then became a Replacement Training Unit (RTU). RTUs were also oversized units, but their mission was to train individual pilots or aircrews.

However, the Army Air Forces (AAF) was finding that standard military units like the 460th, whose manning was based on relatively inflexible tables of organization were proving not well adapted to the training mission, even more so to the replacement mission. Accordingly, the AAF adopted a more functional system in which each base was organized into a separate numbered unit. As a result, the 330th Bombardment Group and its components, including the 460th, along with all supporting units at Biggs were inactivated or disbanded on 1 April 1944 and replaced by the 235th AAF Base Unit (Combat Crew Training School, Bombardment, Very Heavy).

=== B-29 operations in the Pacific ===
The squadron was activated the same day at Walker Army Air Field, Kansas. However, the following month, B-29 groups reorganized from four squadrons of 7 airplanes into three squadrons of 10 planes each. In this reorganization, the squadron was again inactivated a little over a month after it was reactivated.

New B-29 groups were being formed, and the squadron was again activated at Dalhart Army Air Field, Texas on 7 July 1944, and assigned to the 333d Bombardment Group. The 333d Group was also a former heavy bomber training unit that had been inactivated in the spring of 1944. The squadron trained with Superfortresses until June 1945, when it departed for the Pacific to become an element of Eighth Air Force, which was organizing on Okinawa as a second very heavy bomber air force in the Pacific. However, the squadron did not arrive at its combat station, Kadena Airfield, until it was too late to participate in combat. The squadron flew show of force missions and its aircraft helped evacuate prisoners of war from Japan to airfields in the Philippines. The unit was inactivated on 28 May 1946.

== Lineage ==
- Constituted as the 460th Bombardment Squadron (Heavy) on 1 July 1942

Activated on 6 July 1942
Inactivated on 1 April 1944

- Redesignated 460th Bombardment Squadron, Very Heavy

Activated on 1 April 1944
Inactivated on 10 May 1944

- Activated on 7 July 1944

Inactivated on 28 May 1946

=== Assignments ===
- 330th Bombardment Group, 6 July 1942 – 1 April 1944
- 330th Bombardment Group, 1 April – 10 May 1944
- 333d Bombardment Group, 7 July 1944 – 28 May 1946

=== Stations ===
- Salt Lake City Army Air Base, Utah, 6 July 1942
- Alamogordo Army Air Field, New Mexico, 1 August 1942
- Biggs Field, Texas, 2 September 1942
- Alamogordo Army Air Field, New Mexico, 1 December 1942
- Biggs Field, Texas, 5 April 1943 – 1 April 1944
- Walker Army Air Field, Kansas, 1 April – 10 May 1944
- Dalhart Army Air Field, Texas, 7 July 1944
- Great Bend Army Air Field, Kansas, 10 December 1944 – 18 June 1945
- Kadena Airfield, Okinawa, 5 August 1945 – 28 May 1946

=== Aircraft ===
- Consolidated B-24 Liberator, 1942–1944
- Boeing B-29 Superfortress, 1944–1946

=== Campaigns ===
Campaign Streamer	Campaign	Dates	Notes
	American Theater without inscription	6 July 1942–1 April 1944, 1 April 1944-10 May 1944, 7 July 1944-18 June 1945	
	Asiatic Pacific Theater without inscription	5 August 1945–2 September 1945	
