= 507th Bombardment Squadron =

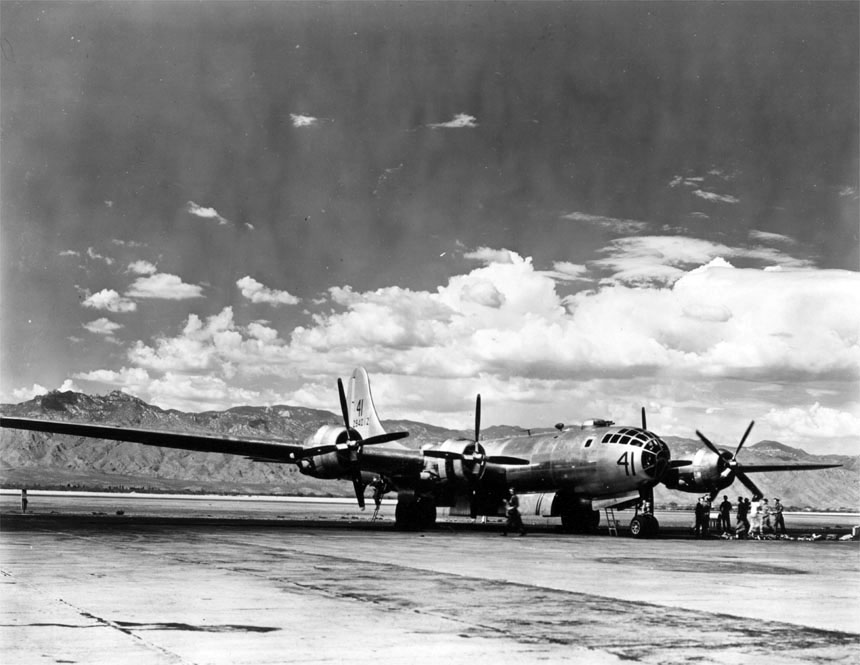
- B-29 Superfortress as flown by the squadron
- Active: 1944; 1944–1946
- Country: United States
- Branch: United States Air Force
- Role: Bombardment
- Engagements: Pacific Theater

Insignia
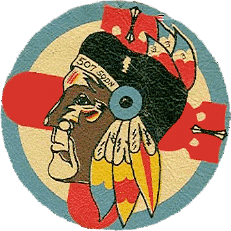
- 507th Bombardment Squadron emblem (Note: Approved 22 August 1945. Description: On a white disc, border blue, two large, red aerial bombs per cross, surmounted at center by a silhouette, side view, black and white Indian head, facing toward dexter, with three, white feathers, trimmed red and blue, in the headdress, and three, white feathers trimmed blue and yellow, red and yellow, and red and yellow, respectively, from left to right fastened to head band by blue and black button.)

The 507th Bombardment Squadron is a former unit of the United States Army Air Forces. It was briefly activated in the spring of 1944, then activated again in the summer as a Boeing B-29 Superfortress unit. It trained for active service during World War II, but moved to its combat station of Kadena Airfield, Okinawa too late in the war to undertake combat missions. It remained on the island until it was inactivated on 28 May 1946.

== History ==
The 507th Bombardment Squadron was activated at Dalhart Army Air Field, Texas on 11 March 1944 as one of the original four squadrons of the 504th Bombardment Group. Although the squadron was intended to be a Boeing B-29 Superfortress unit, at the time it was activated, B-29 groups were being reorganized to have three, rather than four, squadrons assigned. The squadron was inactivated on 10 May as a result of this organizational change without being manned or equipped.

The squadron was again activated at Dalhart on 7 July 1944, but this time was assigned to the 333d Bombardment Group. The 333d Group was a former heavy bomber training unit that had been inactivated in the spring of 1944 in a general Army Air Forces reorganization of its training and support units. It was reactivated in July as a B-29 group. The squadron trained with Superfortresses until June 1945, when it departed for the Pacific to become an element of Eighth Air Force, which was organizing on Okinawa as a second very heavy bomber air force in the Pacific. However, the squadron did not arrive at its combat station, Kadena Airfield, until it was too late to participate in combat. The squadron flew show-of-force missions and its aircraft helped evacuate prisoners of war from Japan to airfields in the Philippines. The unit was inactivated on 28 May 1946.

== Lineage ==
- Constituted as the 507th Bombardment Squadron, Very Heavy on 28 February 1944

Activated on 11 March 1944
Inactivated on 10 May 1944
Activated on 7 July 1944
Inactivated on 28 May 1946

=== Assignments ===
- 504th Bombardment Group, 11 March – 10 May 1944 (not manned or equipped)
- 333d Bombardment Group, 7 July 1944 – 28 May 1946

=== Stations ===
- Dalhart Army Air Field, Texas, 11 March 1944
- Fairmont Army Air Field, Nebraska, 12 March – 10 May 1944
- Dalhart Army Air Field, Texas, 7 July 1944
- Great Bend Army Air Field, Kansas, 10 December 1944 – 18 June 1945
- Kadena Airfield, Okinawa, 5 August 1945 – 28 May 1946

=== Aircraft ===
- Boeing B-29 Superfortress, 1944–1946

=== Campaigns ===
| Campaign Streamer | Campaign | Dates | Notes |
|---|---|---|---|
| | American Theater without inscription | 11 March 1944 – 10 May 1944, 7 July 1944 – 18 June 1945 | |
| | Asiatic–Pacific Theater without inscription | 5 August 1945 – 2 March 1946 | |

== See also ==
- List of B-29 Superfortress operators
