= 421st Air Refueling Squadron =

Inactive US Air Force unit

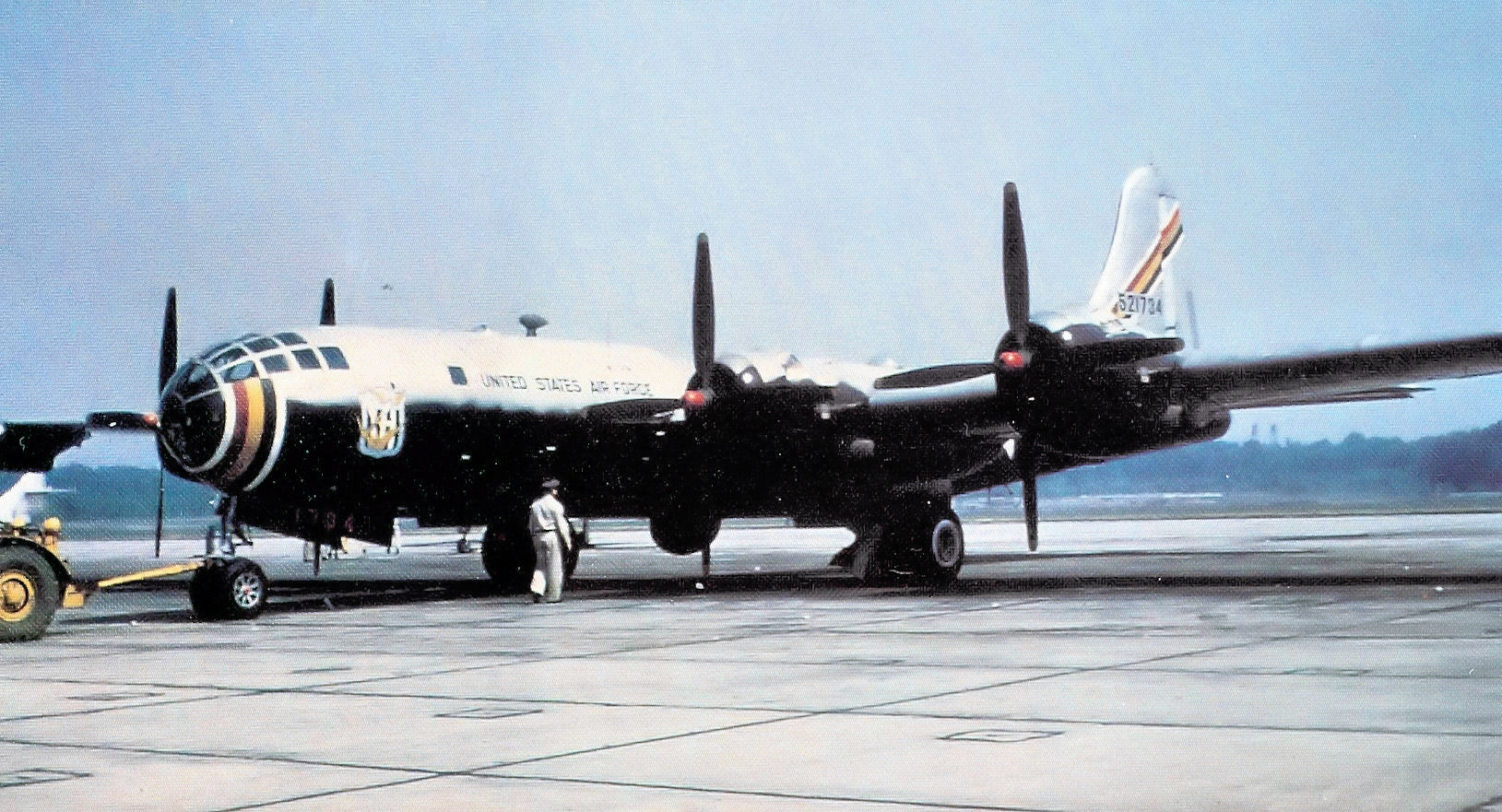
- 421st Air Refueling Squadron Experimental YKB-29T Superfortress at Yokota AB in 1954 (Note: Aircraft is Boeing YKB-29T Superfortress, serial 45-21734 Cross Over the Bridge. Built as Boeing B-29-90-BW Superfortress, it was converted to KB-29 using the looped hose system. Modified as KB-29M with the installation of a probe and drogue system, it became a YKB-29T with the installation of three point refueling with the addition of wing tip hoses. It was reclaimed at Davis-Monthan AFB in February 1955. Baugher, Joe (13 August 2023). "1945 USAF Serial Numbers". Joe Baugher.)
- Active: 1944–1946; 1953–1965
- Country: United States
- Branch: United States Air Force
- Role: Aerial refueling
- Engagements: Pacific Ocean theater of World War II
- Decorations: Distinguished Unit Citation; Air Force Outstanding Unit Award

Insignia
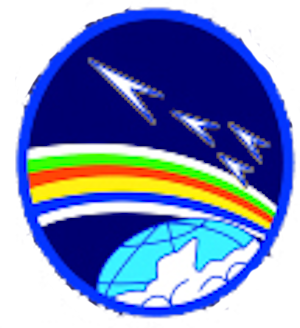
- 421st Air Refueling Squadron Emblem (Note: Approved 1 March 1962.)

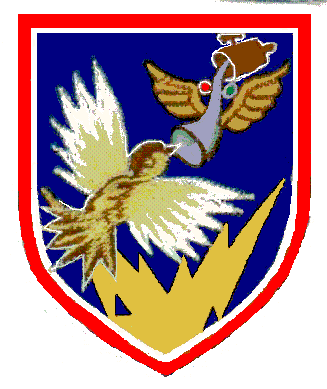
- 421st Air Refueling Squadron Emblem (Note: Approved 18 June 1954.)

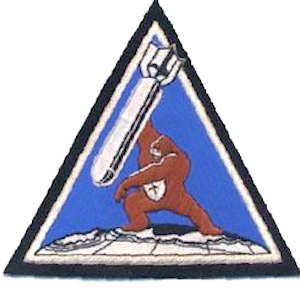
- 421st Bombardment Squadron, Very Heavy emblem (Note: Approved 2 November 1944. Description: On a light turquoise blue triangle resting on base leg, border white edged black, a large brown and white ape standing on a segment of white globe marked with black latitude and longitude lines, casting a black drop shadow, and hurling a very large white aerial bomb, shadowed black, toward dexter base with the upraised right arm.)

The 421st Air Refueling Squadron is an inactive United States Air Force unit. It was last assigned to the 41st Air Division at Yokota Air Base, Japan, where it was inactivated on 18 February 1965.

In 1985 the squadron was consolidated with the 421st Bombardment Squadron, Very Heavy, a World War II very heavy bombardment squadron that participated in the air offensive against Japan with Twentieth Air Force before moving to Clark Field, Philippines, where it was inactivated in 1946. Since consolidation the squadron has not been active.

== History ==
=== World War II ===
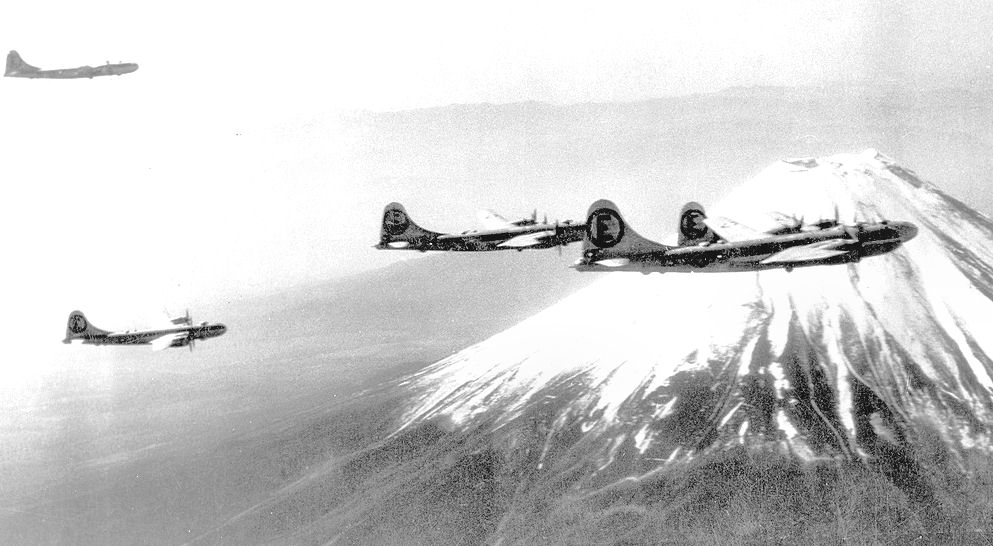
504th Bombardment Group B-29s over Mount Fuji 1945

The 421st Bombardment Squadron was activated on paper in March 1944 at Dalhart Army Air Field, Texas as a Boeing B-29 Superfortress very heavy bombardment squadron. It moved to Fairmont Army Air Field, Nebraska the day after activation, where it received its initial cadre from the 9th Bombardment Group. Because of aircraft availability, initial training missions were flown with Boeing B-17 Flying Fortress aircraft. Once the squadron completed training, it moved to North Field, Tinian in the Mariana Islands of the central Pacific area in January 1945 and became part of the XXI Bomber Command of Twentieth Air Force. Its mission was the strategic bombardment of the Japanese Home Islands and the destruction of Japan's war-making capability.

The 421st flew "shakedown" missions against Japanese targets on Moen Island, Truk, and other points in the Carolines and Marianas. The squadron began combat missions over Japan on 25 February 1945, with a firebombing mission over northeast Tokyo. The 421st continued to participate in wide area firebombing attacks, but the first ten-day blitz resulted in the command running out of incendiary bombs. After that, the squadron flew conventional bombing missions using high explosive bombs. The squadron earned two Distinguished Unit Citations for its attack on the industrial center of Yokohama in May 1945, and mining shipping lanes in the Shimonoseki Strait between Korea and Japan in July and August.

The squadron continued attacking urban areas of major Japanese cities with incendiary ordnance until the end of the war in August 1945, causing massive destruction of urbanized areas. It also conducted raids against strategic objectives, bombing aircraft factories, chemical plants, oil refineries, and other targets in Japan. The squadron flew its last combat missions on 14 August, when hostilities ended. Afterwards, its B-29s carried relief supplies to Allied prisoner of war camps in Japan and Manchuria.

The squadron was largely demobilized on Tinian during the fall of 1945. It remained in the western Pacific. The 421st moved to Clark Field in the Philippines in March 1946. It was inactivated at Clark Field on 15 June 1946. The squadron's low-hour aircraft were flown to storage depots in the United States.

=== Cold War ===
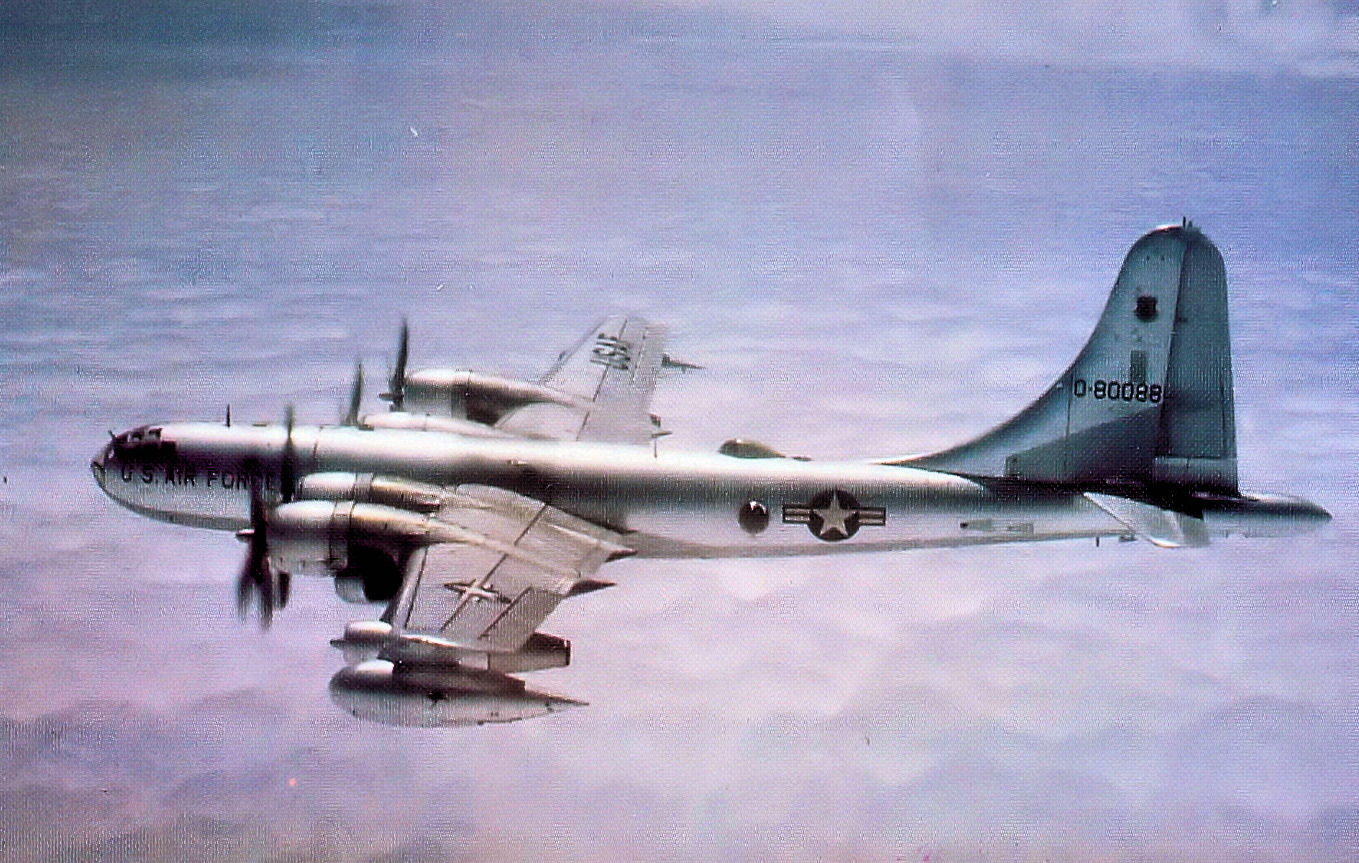
421st Air Refueling Squadron KB-50J Superfortress (Note: Aircraft is Boeing KB-50J Superfortress, serial 48-088 in 1960. This aircraft was built as Boeing B-50D-90-BO Superfortress and later converted to KB-50. It was transferred to the Military Aircraft Storage and Disposition Center on 4 February 1965 and declared excess on 23 March. Baugher, Joe (12 July 2023). "1946-1948 USAF Serial Numbers". Joe Baugher.)

The 421st Air Refueling Squadron's origins were in an advanced detachment of tankers assigned to the 98th Bombardment Wing, which moved to Yokota Air Base, Japan from Spokane Air Force Base, Washington. Shortly after arrival at Yokota, the detachment was replaced by the 421st Air Refueling Squadron, which assumed its mission, equipment, and personnel. The mission of the squadron was to provide dedicated air refueling for in-flight refueling capable Far East Air Forces (later Pacific Air Forces) bombers, fighters, and fighter bombers. The squadron was initially equipped with transferred Strategic Air Command (SAC) KB-29M Stratofortress bombers that were converted to tankers using a British-developed hose refueling system.

In 1958, the squadron upgraded to Boeing B-50 Superfortress tankers, which provided greater speed to refuel jet aircraft. KB-50s were modified about 1959 to KB-50J configuration which added a J-47 turbojet engine underneath each wing in place of the auxiliary fuel tanks to increase the speed of the aircraft.

Some aircraft and crews deployed to Don Muang Royal Thai Air Force Base, Thailand in 1961 to support USAF advisory tactical jet aircraft. Some of these aircraft ran low on fuel while still over South Vietnam. Some of the refuelings were carried out at such low altitudes that they came under hostile ground fire.

By 1964, the unit possessed almost all of the KB-50s remaining in the Air Force inventory, but its aircraft began to show signs of corrosion and structural fatigue. They were taken out of service in 1965, but it was considered too risky to fly them across the Pacific to storage at the Military Aircraft Storage and Disposition Center at Davis–Monthan AFB, Arizona. The squadron's aircraft were scrapped on their hardstands at Yokota. The squadron inactivated and its mission was assumed by SAC Boeing KC-97 Stratofreighters and Boeing KC-135 Stratotankers.

== Lineage ==
421st Bombardment Squadron

- Constituted as 421st Bombardment Squadron, Very Heavy on 28 February 1944

Activated on 11 March 1944
Inactivated on 15 June 1946
Consolidated on 19 September 1985 with 421st Air Refueling Squadron as the 421st Air Refueling Squadron (remained inactive)

421st Air Refueling Squadron

- Constituted c. 1 July 1953 as 421st Air Refueling Squadron, Medium

Activated on 8 July 1953
Redesignated as 421st Air Refueling Squadron, Fighter-Bomber
Redesignated as 421st Air Refueling Squadron, Tactical on 1 July 1958
Inactivated on 18 February 1965
Consolidated on 19 September 1985 with 421st Bombardment Squadron as the 421st Air Refueling Squadron, Heavy (remained inactive)

- Redesignated 421st Expeditionary Air Refueling Squadron and converted to provisional status on 12 June 2002

=== Assignments ===
- 504th Bombardment Group, 11 March 1944 – 15 June 1946
- Japan Air Defense Force, 8 July 1953
- 49th Fighter-Bomber Wing, 15 January 1954 (attached to 49th Fighter-Bomber Group to 17 September 1957, then to 67th Tactical Reconnaissance Wing)
- 67th Tactical Reconnaissance Wing, 1 October 1957 (attached to 41st Air Division after 21 November 1960)
- 41st Air Division, 8 December 1960 – 18 February 1965
- Air Mobility Command to activate or inactivate as needed, 12 June 2002
- Air Combat Command to activate or inactivate as needed, 19 March 2003

=== Stations ===
- Dalhart Army Air Field, Texas, 11 March 1944
- Fairmont Army Air Field, Nebraska, 12 March-5 November 1944
- North Field, Tinian, Mariana Islands, 23 December 1944
- Clark Field, Luzon, Philippines, 13 March 1946 – 15 June 1946
- Yokota Air Base, Japan, 8 July 1953 – 18 February 1965

=== Aircraft ===
- Boeing B-29 Superfortress, 1944–1946
- Boeing KB-29M Superfortress, 1954–1955
- Boeing KB-50J Superfortress, 1955–1965

=== Awards and campaigns ===
Award streamer	Award	Dates	Notes
	Distinguished Unit Citation	28 May 1945	421st Bombardment Squadron Yokohama, Japan
	Distinguished Unit Citation	27 July 1945 – 14 August 1945	421st Bombardment Squadron Japan and Korea
	Air Force Outstanding Unit Award	1 July 1960 – 31 March 1962	421st Air Refueling Squadron
	Air Force Outstanding Unit Award	1 November 1962 – 15 March 1964	421st Air Refueling Squadron
	Air Force Outstanding Unit Award	9 June 1964 – 14 October 1964	421st Air Refueling Squadron

Campaign Streamer	Campaign	Dates	Notes
	Air Offensive, Japan		421st Bombardment Squadron
	Eastern Mandates		421st Bombardment Squadron
	Western Pacific		421st Bombardment Squadron
