= 521st Fighter-Bomber Squadron =

- Active: 1943-1944
- Country: United States
- Allegiance: United States Air Force
- Branch: Fighter-Bomber
- Size: Squadron

Aircraft flown
- Bomber: A-24 Banshee; P-39 Airacobra; A-36 Apache; B-25 Mitchell

The 521st Fighter-Bomber Squadron is an inactive United States Air Force unit. Its last was assigned to the 415th Bombardment Group, stationed at Dalhart Army Airfield, Texas. It was inactivated on 5 Apr 1944.

== History ==
Established in early 1943 as an A-24 dive bomber squadron. Assigned to the Army Air Forces School of Applied Tactics, Air University in Florida as a training unit to develop combat tactics to be used by overseas combat units. Also equipped with P-39 fighters and A-36 dive bombers with the phaseout of the A-24.

When AAFSAT closed, was re-assigned as a B-25 medium training squadron and supported Army maneuvers. Inactivated in April 1944 with re-organization of training command designations.

=== Lineage ===
- Constituted 667th Bombardment Squadron (Dive) on 12 Feb 1943.

Activated on 15 Feb 1943.
Re-designated 521st Fighter-Bomber Squadron 10 Aug 1943.
Disbanded on 5 Apr 1944.

=== Assignments ===
- 415th Bombardment Group, 15 Feb 1943 – 5 Apr 1944.

=== Stations ===
- Alachua Army Airfield, Florida, 15 Feb 1943
- Orlando Army Airbase, Florida, 2 Mar 1944;
- Dalhart Army Airfield, Texas, 19 Mar-5 Apr 1944

=== Aircraft ===
- A-24 Banshee (1943)
- P-39 Airacobra (1943)
- A-36 Apache (1943)
- B-25 Mitchell (1943-1944)
