= 465th Tactical Training Squadron =

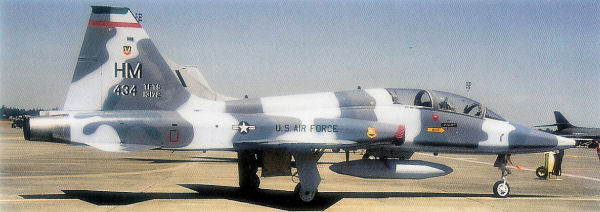
- T-38 Talon used for fighter training t Holloman AFB
- Active: 1942–1944; 1972–1991
- Country: United States
- Branch: United States Air Force
- Motto: Respice Tuo Sex (Latin for 'Check Six')
- Decorations: Air Force Outstanding Unit Award

Insignia
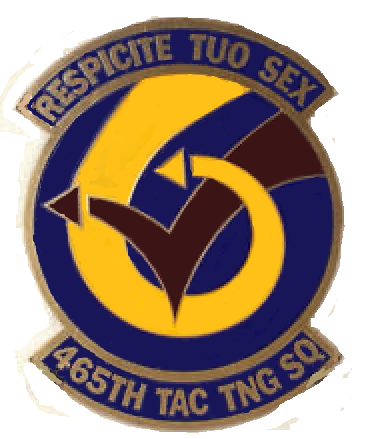
- 465th Tactical Training Squadron emblem

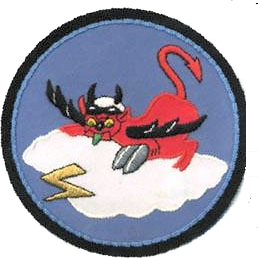
- 465th Bombardment Squadron emblem (Note: Approved 22 June 1943. Description: On a light blue disc, a red devil with black bat wings, horns, tail barbed, and hoofs, with an expression of impudence on face, eyes green and yellow, leaning on and peering over a white cloud formation, and holding two gray fragmentation bombs under the left arm; yellow lightning bolt emitting from cloud formation.)

The 465th Tactical Training Squadron is an inactive United States Air Force unit. During World War II as the 465th Bombardment Squadron, it was an operational and replacement unit from 1942 to 1944, when it was disbanded in a general reorganization of Army Air Forces training and support units in the United States.

The squadron was reconstituted as the 465th Tactical Fighter Training Squadron in 1973 and briefly operated the General Dynamics F-111 Aardvark at Cannon Air Force Base, New Mexico. It moved to Holloman Air Force Base, New Mexico and operated as a fighter and academic training unit until inactivating in 1991.

== History ==
=== World War II ===
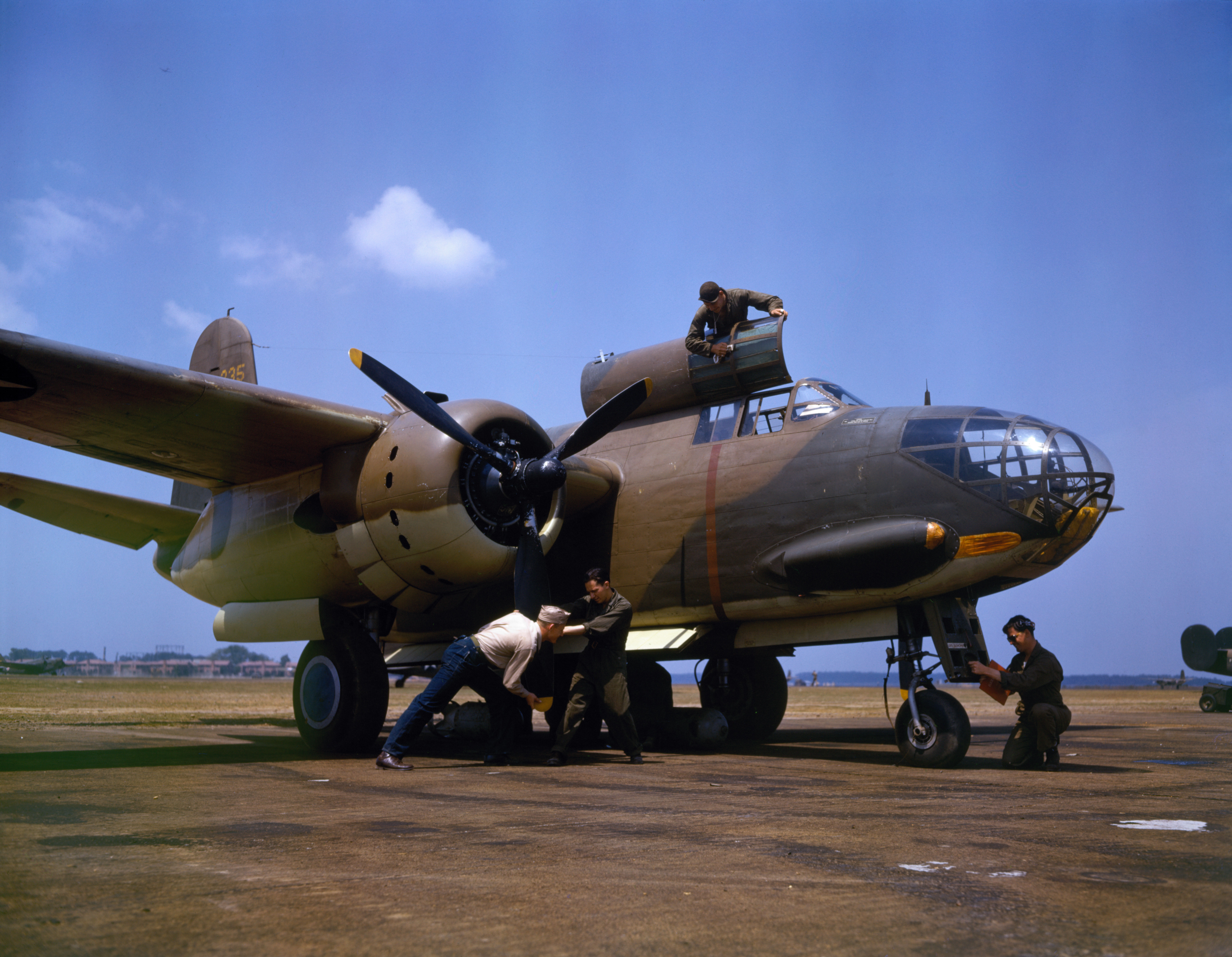
A-20 Havoc

The 27th Bombardment Group had engaged in combat in the Southwest Pacific Theater, both in the air with Douglas A-24 Banshees and on ground as infantry in the Philippines. In May 1942, the group and its three squadrons were withdrawn from the theater and moved on paper to Key Field, Mississippi, where it began reforming as a Douglas A-20 Havoc unit. To bring the group to its full strength, the squadron was activated in July 1942 as the 465th Bombardment Squadron. In addition to A-20s, the squadron also was assigned a few DB-7 export versions of the Havoc

In the fall of 1942, the 27th Group prepared for movement to North Africa, but would be converted to a fighter-bomber unit flying North American A-36 Apaches. Because Army Air Forces (AAF) fighter-bomber groups were assigned only three squadrons, when the group moved overseas in late November 1942, the 465th was reassigned to III Air Support Command, and became an Operational Training Unit (OTU). The OTU program involved the use of an oversized parent unit to provide cadres to “satellite groups ". The OTU program was patterned after the unit training system of the Royal Air Force. The parent group assumed responsibility for the satellite's training and oversaw their expansion with graduates of Army Air Forces Training Command schools to become effective combat units. Phase I training concentrated on individual training in crewmember specialties. Phase II training emphasized the coordination for the crew to act as a team. The final phase concentrated on operation as a unit.

In January 1943, the squadron moved to Alachua Army Air Field, Florida, where it became part of the Army Air Forces School of Applied Tactics. In addition to training cadres for newly-formed groups it also demonstrated tactics for light bomber units as part of the 415th Bombardment Group. In March 1944 the group moved to Dalhart Army Air Field, Texas, where it became a Replacement Training Unit. Replacement Training Units were similar to OTUs in that they were oversized units, but their mission was to train individual pilots or aircrews. However, even as the squadron arrived at Dalhart, the AAF was finding that standard military units, based on relatively inflexible tables of organization were not proving well adapted to the training mission. Accordingly, a more functional system was adopted in which each base was organized into a separate numbered unit. The 415th Group, including the squadron, and support units at Dalhart were disbanded, and their personnel and equipment were transferred to the 232d AAF Base Unit. (Note: A-20 training did not continue at Dalhart. The 232d AAF Base Unit was a very heavy bomber unit.)

=== Tactical Air Command ===
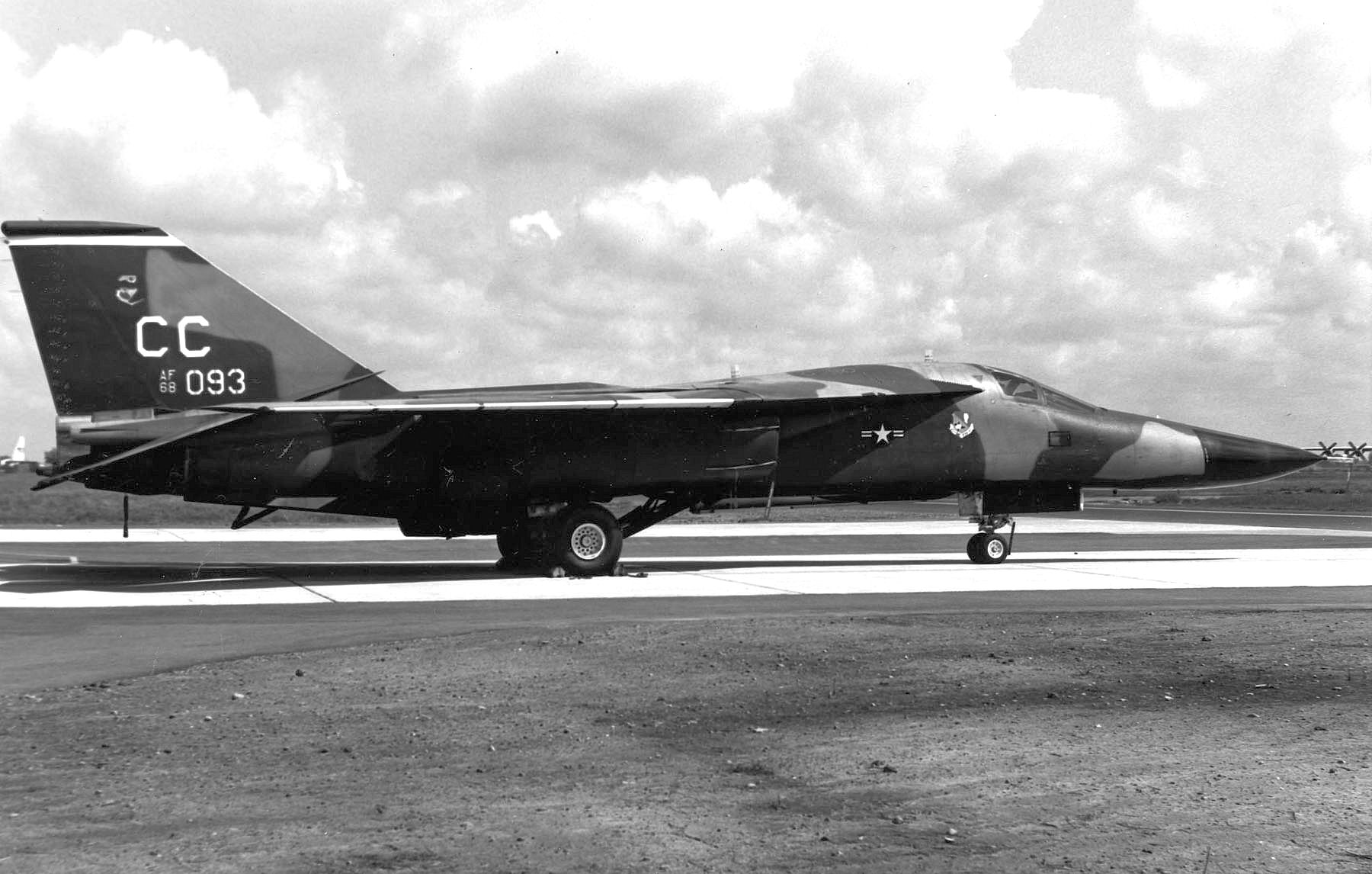
27th Tactical Fighter Wing F-111

In the fall of 1972, the squadron was reconstituted as the 465th Tactical Fighter Training Squadron and reactivated on 1 December at Cannon Air Force Base, New Mexico, where it trained crews on the General Dynamics F-111 Aardvark as part of the 27th Tactical Fighter Wing. This mission lasted only eight months, and in August 1973, the squadron moved to Holloman Air Force Base, New Mexico, where it conducted lead in fighter training with the Northrop AT-38 Talon under the 49th Tactical Fighter Wing. In January 1977, flying training activities at Holloman were put under the newly activated 479th Tactical Training Wing. The squadron was transferred to the 479th Wing, where it performed the academic training portion of the wing's mission. It continued this mission until it was inactivated in 1991, when its mission, personnel and equipment was transferred to the 435th Tactical Training Squadron.

== Lineage ==
- Constituted as the 465th Bombardment Squadron (Light) on 7 July 1942

Activated on 13 July 1942
Disbanded on 5 April 1944

- Reconstituted on 27 October 1972 and redesignated 465th Tactical Fighter Training Squadron

Activated 1 December 1972 (Note: During the entire time the squadron was active as the 465th Tactical Fighter Training Squadron, an unrelated 465th Tactical Fighter Squadron was active in the reserve.)
Redesignated 465th Tactical Training Squadron on 1 January 1977
Inactivated on 19 February 1991

=== Assignments ===
- 27th Bombardment Group, 13 July 1942
- III Air Support Command, 21 November 1942
- Army Air Forces School of Applied Tactics, c. 22 January 1943
- 415th Bombardment Group, 23 March 1943 – 5 April 1944
- 27th Tactical Fighter Wing, 1 December 1972
- 49th Tactical Fighter Wing, 1 August 1973
- 479th Tactical Training Wing, 1 January 1977 – 19 February 1991

=== Stations ===
- Key Field, Mississippi, 13 July 1942
- Hattiesburg Army Air Field, Mississippi, 15 August 1942
- Harding Field, Louisiana, 26 October 1942
- Alachua Army Air Field, Florida, 24 January 1943
- Montbrook Army Air Field, Florida, c. 19 November 1943
- Orlando Army Air Base, Florida, 2 March 1944
- Dalhart Army Air Field, Texas, 19 March-5 April 1944
- Cannon Air Force Base, New Mexico, 1 December 1972
- Holloman Air Force Base, New Mexico, 1 August 1973 – 19 February 1991

=== Aircraft ===
- Douglas DB-7 Boston, 1942.
- Douglas A-20 Havoc, 1942-1944
- General Dynamics F-111 Aardvark, 1972-1973
- Northrop AT-38 Talon, 1973-1977

=== Awards and campaigns ===
Award streamer	Award	Dates	Notes
	Air Force Outstanding Unit Award	1 January 1976-31 December 1976	465th Tactical Fighter Training Squadron
	Air Force Outstanding Unit Award	1 May 1981-30 April 1983	465th Tactical Training Squadron

Campaign Streamer	Campaign	Dates	Notes
	American Theater without inscription	13 July 1942 – 5 April 1944	465 Bombardment Squadron

== See also ==
- List of United States Air Force fighter squadrons
- List of Douglas A-20 Havoc operators
