= 467th Bombardment Squadron =

Inactive United States Air Force unit

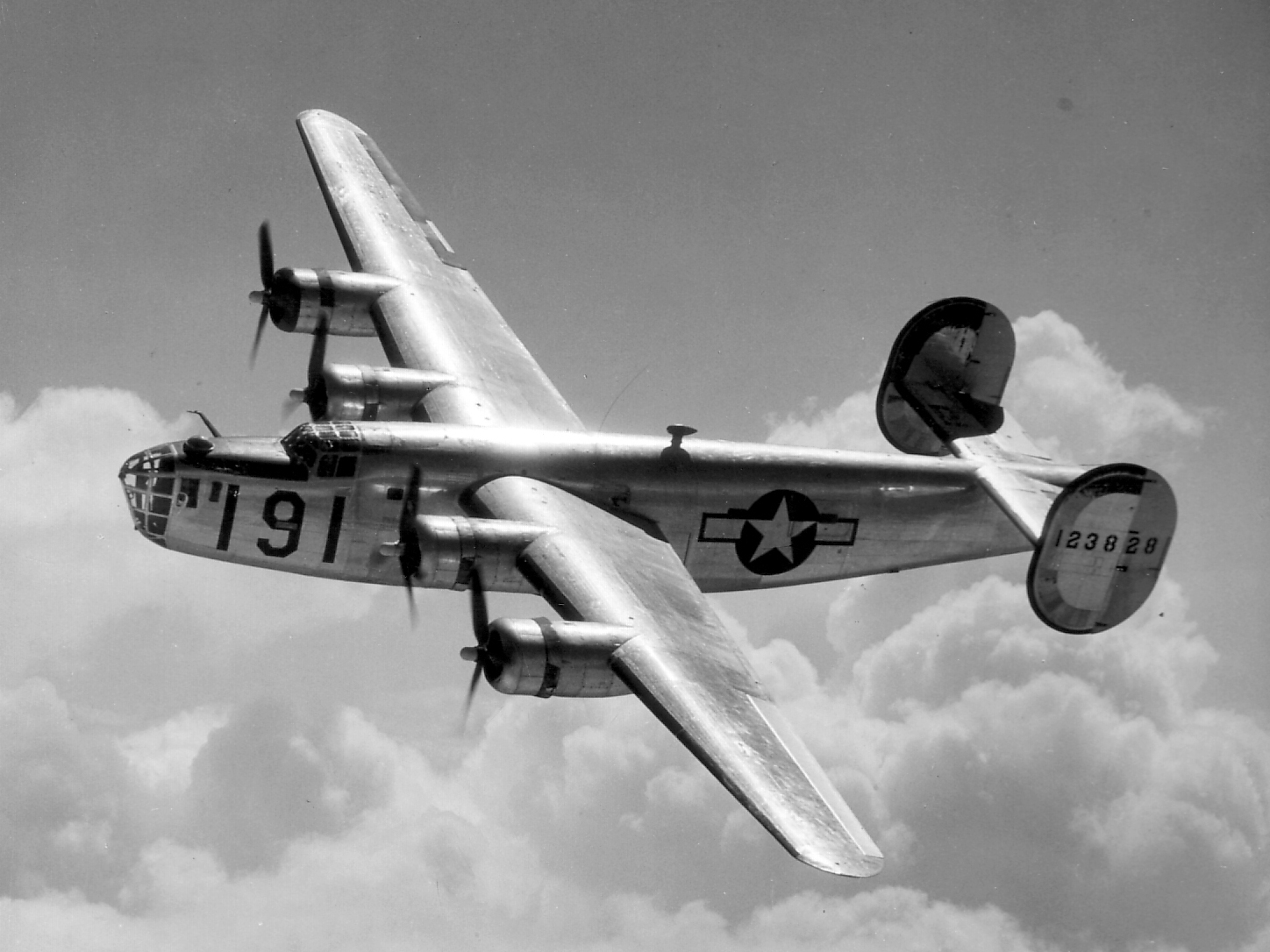
- B-24 Liberator of a crew training unit
- Active: 1942–1944
- Country: United States
- Branch: United States Air Force
- Role: Heavy bomber training

The 467th Bombardment Squadron is an inactive United States Air Force unit. It served during World War II as an Operational Training Unit, and later as a Replacement Training Unit. It was inactivated at Dalhart Army Air Field, Texas in the spring of 1944 in a general reorganization of Army Air Forces support and training units in the United States.

== History ==
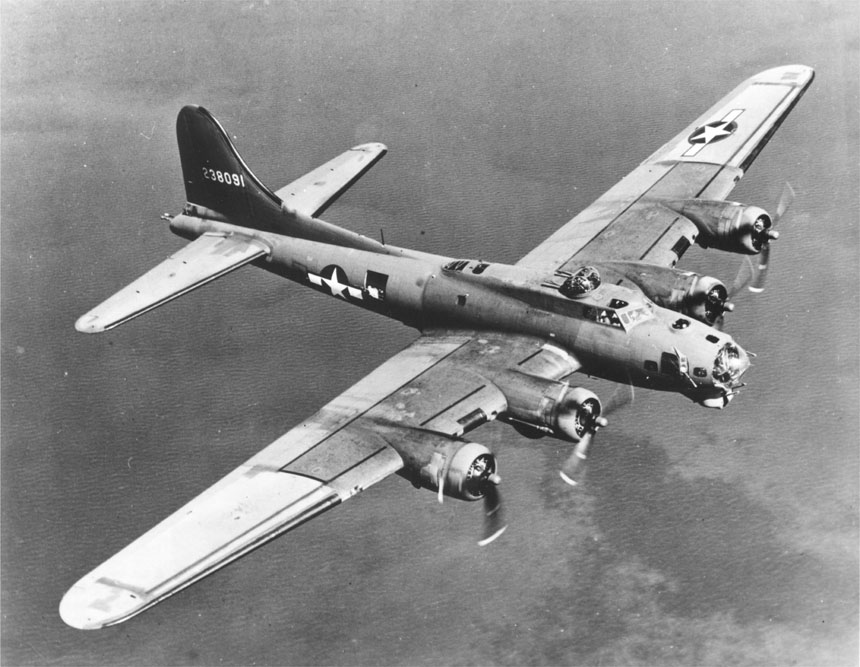
B-17 Flying Fortress of a training unit

The 467th Bombardment Squadron was activated on 15 July 1942 at Salt Lake City Army Air Base, Utah as one of the four original squadrons of the 333d Bombardment Group. (Note: Maurer indicates the squadrons of the 333rd Group were activated at Salt Lake, then moved to Topeka in August. Maurer, Combat Squadrons, pp. 573-575. However, the 333rd Group was activated at Topeka, and the Air Force Historical Research Agency Factsheet for the only original squadron of the 333rd, currently the 966th Airborne Air Control Squadron, gives Topeka as its activation station. Maurer, Combat Units, pp.213-14; "Factsheet 966 Airborne Air Control Squadron". Air Force Historical Research Agency. 31 March 2008.) In August, it began operating as an Operational Training Unit (OTU) for Boeing B-17 Flying Fortress units. The OTU program involved the use of an oversized parent unit to provide cadres to "satellite groups" The OTU program was patterned after the unit training system of the Royal Air Force. The parent assumed responsibility for satellite unit training and oversaw their expansion with graduates of Army Air Forces Training Command schools to become effective combat units. Phase I training concentrated on individual training in crewmember specialties. Phase II training emphasized the coordination for the crew to act as a team. The final phase concentrated on operation as a unit. Later that year, the squadron traded its Flying Fortresses for Consolidated B-24 Liberators.

In February 1943, the squadron moved to Dalhart Army Air Field, Texas. However, many of the Army Air Forces' bomber units had been activated. With the exception of special programs, like forming Boeing B-29 Superfortress units, training “fillers” for existing units became more important than unit training. The squadron mission changed to becoming a Replacement Training Unit (RTU). RTUs were also oversized units, but their mission was to train individual pilots or aircrews. It continued this mission through November 1943.

The AAF was finding that standard military units like the 467th, whose manning was based on relatively inflexible tables of organization were proving not well adapted to the training mission, even more so to the replacement mission. Accordingly, the Army Air Forces adopted a more functional system in which each base was organized into a separate numbered unit. The 467th and other training and support units at Dalhart were disbanded or inactivated on 1 April 1944 and replaced by the 232d AAF Base Unit.

=== Lineage ===
- Constituted as the 467th Bombardment Squadron (Heavy) on 9 July 1942

Activated on 15 July 1942
Inactivated on 1 April 1944

=== Assignments ===
- 333d Bombardment Group, 15 July 1942 – 1 April 1944

=== Stations ===
- Salt Lake City Army Air Base, Utah, 15 July 1942
- Topeka Army Air Base, Kansas, c. 21 August 1942
- Dalhart Army Air Field, Texas, 22 February 1943 – 1 April 1944

=== Aircraft ===
- Boeing B-17 Flying Fortress, 1942
- Consolidated B-24 Liberator, 1942–1943

=== Campaign ===
| Campaign Streamer | Campaign | Dates | Notes |
|---|---|---|---|
| | American Theater without inscription | 15 July 1942–1 April 1944 | |

== See also ==
- B-17 Flying Fortress units of the United States Army Air Forces
- B-24 Liberator units of the United States Army Air Forces
