= 421 BC =

421 BC in various calendars
- Gregorian calendar: 421 BC; CDXXI BC
- Ab urbe condita: 333
- Ancient Egypt era: XXVII dynasty, 105
- Pharaoh: Darius II of Persia, 3
- Ancient Greek Olympiad (summer): 89th Olympiad, year 4
- Assyrian calendar: 4330
- Balinese saka calendar: N/A
- Bengali calendar: −1014 – −1013
- Berber calendar: 530
- Buddhist calendar: 124
- Burmese calendar: −1058
- Byzantine calendar: 5088–5089
- Chinese calendar: 己未年 (Earth Goat); 2277 or 2070 — to — 庚申年 (Metal Monkey); 2278 or 2071
- Coptic calendar: −704 – −703
- Discordian calendar: 746
- Ethiopian calendar: −428 – −427
- Hebrew calendar: 3340–3341
- Hindu calendars
- Vikram Samvat: −364 – −363
- Shaka Samvat: N/A
- Kali Yuga: 2680–2681
- Holocene calendar: 9580
- Iranian calendar: 1042 BP – 1041 BP
- Islamic calendar: 1074 BH – 1073 BH
- Javanese calendar: N/A
- Julian calendar: N/A
- Korean calendar: 1913
- Minguo calendar: 2332 before ROC 民前2332年
- Nanakshahi calendar: −1888
- Thai solar calendar: 122–123
- Tibetan calendar: ས་མོ་ལུག་ལོ་ (female Earth-Sheep) −294 or −675 or −1447 — to — ལྕགས་ཕོ་སྤྲེ་ལོ་ (male Iron-Monkey) −293 or −674 or −1446

Year 421 BC was a year of the pre-Julian Roman calendar. At the time, it was known in Rome as the Year of the Consulship of Vibulanus and Barbatus (or, less frequently, year 333 Ab urbe condita). The denomination 421 BC for this year has been used since the early medieval period, when the Anno Domini calendar era became the prevalent method in Europe for naming years.

== Events ==
=== By place ===
==== Greece ====
- Nicias, the leader of the aristocratic and peace party in Athens and Pleistoanax, King of Sparta, negotiate the Peace of Nicias between Athens and Sparta, which brings a temporary end to the Peloponnesian War. The essence of the Peace of Nicias is a return to the antebellum period with most wartime gains being returned. Seventeen representatives from each side swear an oath to uphold the treaty, which is meant to last for one generation (30 years: meaning they are not responsible for the next generation's decision). All of Sparta's allies agree to sign the peace except for the Boeotians, Corinth, Elis, and Megara.
- Alcibiades engineers an anti-Spartan alliance between Athens and the democracies of Argos, Mantinea and Elis.

==== Italy ====
- The city of Cumae, the most northerly of the Greek colonies in Italy, falls to the Samnites.

=== By topic ===
==== Art ====
- The construction of the Porch of the Maidens (the Caryatid Porch) commences at the Erechtheion which is part of the Acropolis in Athens.

==== Drama ====
- Aristophanes' play Peace is performed.

== Deaths ==
- Cratinus, Greek comedy author (approximate date) (b. 520 BC)
