= Alachua Army Air Field =

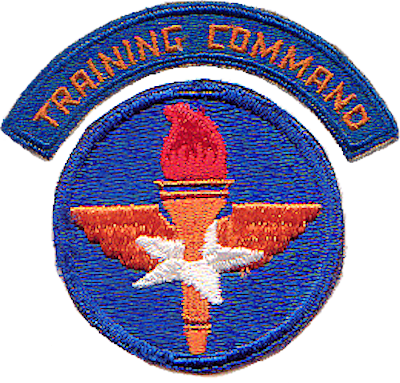
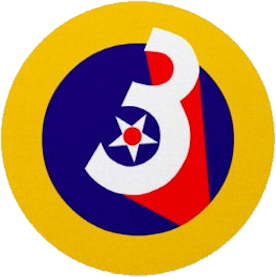
Alachua Army Airfield
- Part of Army Air Forces Training Command; Third Air Force
- Located near: Gainesville, Florida
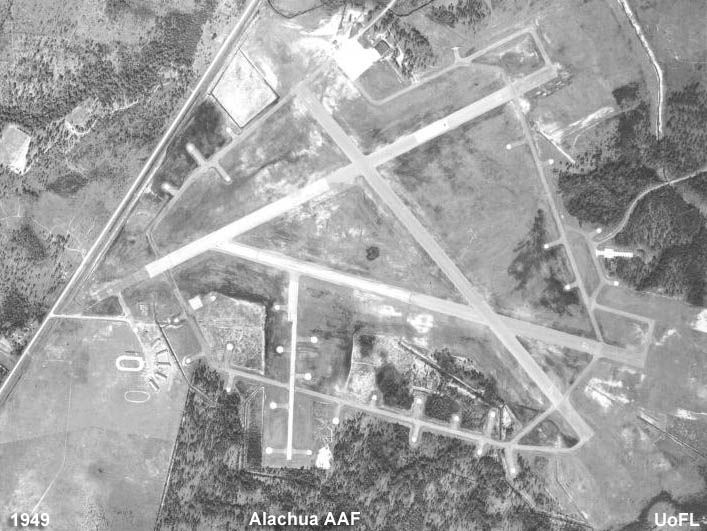
- Alachua Army Airfield – 1949

Location
- Coordinates: 29°41′24″N 082°16′18″W

Site history
- In use: 1940–1945

Alachua Army Airfield, was a World War II United States Army Air Force airfield, located 4.2 miles (6.8 km) northeast of Gainesville, Florida.

== History ==
Construction of the Gainesville Municipal Airport began in April 1940 as a Works Project Administration (WPA) and, by 1941 construction was taken over by the Army Corps of Engineers as part of the expansion of defense forces in the United States prior to World War II.

The site was taken over by the United States Army Air Forces, with the airport being designated as Alachua Army Airfield. It began operations within months of the December 7, 1941, Japanese attack on Pearl Harbor.

On 2 March 1942, the Gainesville City Council established the name of the airfield as the John R. Alison Airport. John R. Alison was a local citizen and graduate of the University of Florida who served with valor and distinction in World War II. He was selected to serve as an observer in England and later served in Russia training Russian flyers.

=== Army Air Forces School of Applied Tactics ===
Initially assigned to Air Technical Service Command as a maintenance and supply support airfield, in 1943, it was transferred to the Air University Army Air Forces School of Applied Tactics (AAFSAT) tactical combat simulation school. Headquartered at Orlando AAB,

AAFSAT's function was to train cadres from newly formed units in combat operations under simulated field conditions as the cores around which new combat groups would be formed. AAFSAT operated several units from the airfield, including Dive Bombers, light attack bombers and observation aircraft. Later, the 50th Fighter Group arrived in November 1943 with P-47s and P-51 fighters, engaging in mock combat missions over the skies of Florida.

Through the joint efforts of the City Commission and the Federal Government, a Service Center opened in Gainesville July 1943 for dances and other recreation for the soldiers. Civic-minded citizens formed a Girls Service Club and the Masonic Lodge provided dormitory space for servicemen.

=== Third Air Force ===
The Air University training mission ended in late June 1944, when Alachua was officially reassigned to III Fighter Command. With the transfer, Alachua was assigned to Third Air Force.

A different mission of sorts was ordered by III Fighter Command, the training of Air Commando fighter units for the China Burma India Theater and the invasion of Burma. Air Commando units were formed to be part of the invasion force to operate from captured Japanese airfields behind the main battle lines in India. Parachutists would be dropped on enemy held fields, and quickly the Allies would fly in fighter and transport units to operate from those fields. As the battle moved further east, the commandos would jump ahead and establish new bases. In each case the pattern had been the same: spot open spaces from the air, send in glider-borne engineers and equipment to hack an airstrip from the brush, and within a matter of hours, fly in troops to harass the enemy and his lines of communication with P-51 Mustang fighter and B-25 medium bomber units.

The 3d Air Commando Group arrived for training in late June 1944 after being formed and organized at Drew and Lakeland Army Airfield. Four P-51 Mustang fighter squadrons trained at Alachua from June though October. In addition, a Commando Troop Carrier Squadron with C-47s was trained at the airfield.

=== Closure ===
With the Air Commando units moving out at the end of 1944, the maintenance mission of Technical Service command was the primary mission of the base. The airfield remained open; mostly seeing transient training aircraft from various training bases in Florida and South Georgia. The number of personnel were reduced, being reassigned to other bases, and with the end of the European War, in mid-May 1945 orders were received from Third Air Force that Alachua Army Airfield would be closed.

During the summer, buildings and equipment were sold with any useful military equipment being transferred to other bases around the country. The airfield was declared surplus in September 1945 and turned over to the Army Corps of Engineers on October 1, 1946. The War Assets Administration deeded the facility to the city of Gainesville in 1948 as a civil airport. The airfield was deeded to the city of Gainesville in 1948. At that time, the field was known as the John R. Alison Airport and also as the Gainesville Municipal Airport. Currently it is operating as Gainesville Regional Airport, with scheduled airline flights and General Aviation operations. The area of the airfield that was originally for gunnery practice is currently in operation as the Gator Skeet and Trap Club.

=== Major units assigned ===
Air Forces School of Applied Tactics

- 50th Fighter Group, 20 November 1943 – 1 February 1944

81st Fighter Squadron (Special), 20 November 1943-1 February 1944 (P-47 Thunderbolt)
313th Fighter Squadron, 20 November 1943-1 February 1944 (P-51 Mustang)

- 465th Bombardment Squadron (Light), 24 January-19 November 1943 (A-20 Havoc)
- 667th Bombardment Squadron (Dive) (later: 521st Fighter-Bomber Squadron), 15 February 1943 – 2 March 1944 (A-24 Dauntless); (A-36 Apache)
- 3d Tactical Reconnaissance Squadron, 3 February-6 March 1944 (L-2, L-3 Grasshopper)

III Fighter Command

- 3d Air Commando Group, 20 August-6 October 1944 (P-51 Mustang)

1st Fighter Squadron (Commando), 21 June-17 August 1944
2d Fighter Squadron (Commando), 21 June-17 August 1944
3d Fighter Squadron (Commando), 7 August-6 October 1944
4th Fighter Squadron (Commando), 21 August-6 October 1944

- 317th Troop Carrier Squadron (Commando), 7–21 June 1944 (C-47 Skytrain)

== See also ==
- Florida World War II Army Airfields
- Army Air Force School of Applied Tactics
