= 633rd Special Operations Wing =

333d Special Operations Wing Active as the 633rd Special Operations Wing

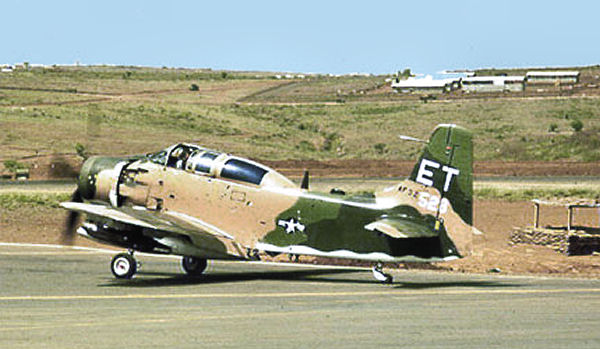
- A-1E Skyraider of the wing's 6th Special Operations Squadron
- Active: 1942–1944; 1944–1946; 1968-1970
- Country: United States
- Branch: United States Air Force
- Role: Special Operations
- Part of: Pacific Air Forces
- Engagements: Pacific Theater; Vietnam War
- Decorations: Air Force Outstanding Unit Award with Combat "V" Device; Republic of Vietnam Gallantry Cross with Palm

Insignia
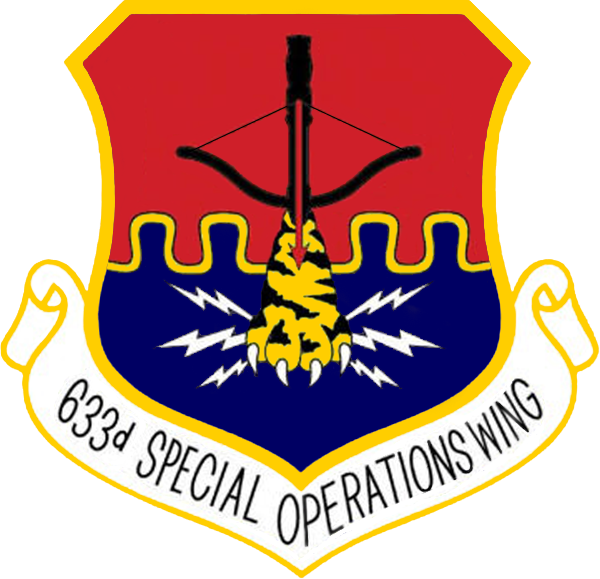
- 633d Special Operations Wing emblem (approved 29 May 1969)

The 333d Special Operations Wing is an inactive United States Air Force unit. It was active from July 1968 through March 1970 at Pleiku Air Base, South Vietnam. In 1985, the wing was consolidated with the 333d Bombardment Group as the 333d Special Operations Wing.

== History ==
=== World War II ===
==== Heavy bomber training unit ====
The 333d Bombardment Group, a Boeing B-17 Flying Fortress Operational Training Unit (OTU) assigned to Second Air Force, was established at Topeka Army Air Base, Kansas in July 1942. The 333d's original components were the 466th, 467th, 468th and 469th Bombardment Squadrons. The squadrons were all initially formed at Salt Lake City Army Air Base, and did not join group headquarters at Topeka until late August.

The OTU program involved the use of an oversized parent unit to provide cadres to "satellite groups". In February 1943 it moved to Dalhart Army Air Field, Texas, and shifted its mission to become a Replacement Training Unit (RTU). RTUs were also oversized units, but trained individual pilots or aircrews for shipment to theaters of operation. However, the Army Air Forces found that standard military units like the 333d, based on relatively inflexible tables of organization, were not proving well adapted to the training mission. Accordingly a more functional system was adopted in which each base was organized into a separate numbered unit. As a result, the group was inactivated and training activities at Dalhart were assumed by the 232d (bomber) and 268th (fighter) AAF Base Units.

==== Very heavy bomber operations ====
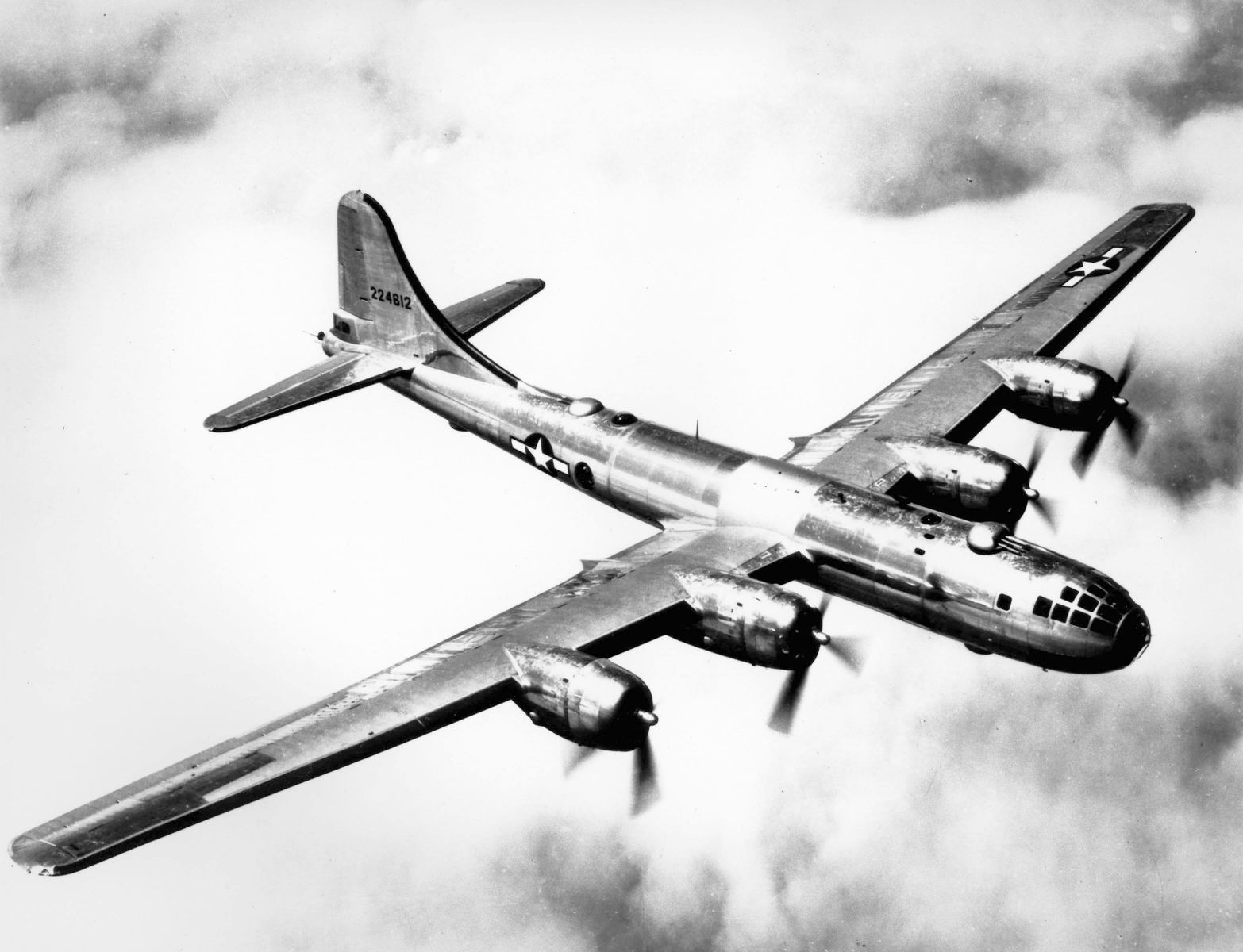
B-29 Superfortress as flown by the group

Dalhart became a center for organizing Boeing B-29 Superfortress very heavy bombardment groups and the 333d was again activated there in July 1944. However, its original squadrons were not activated along with it. Instead, the 435th, 460th, and 507th Bombardment Squadrons were assigned. These three squadrons had previously been the "fourth" (highest numbered) squadrons in groups that also flew B-29s. The three squadrons had been inactivated in May 1944, when B-29 groups were reorganized to have three, rather than four squadrons. The 435th had seen combat in the Southwest Pacific Theater early in the war.

In January 1945 the group moved to Great Bend Army Air Field, Kansas, where it continued its training until June 1945. The group deployed to Okinawa as part of Eighth Air Force in the Pacific Theater. It arrived in Okinawa, but the end of the war with the defeat of Japan led to a drawdown of Eighth Air Force and the group never engaged in combat. The group helped evacuate prisoners of war from Japan to airfields in the Philippines. The unit was inactivated on Okinawa on 28 May 1946.

=== Vietnam War ===
The 633d Combat Support Group had provided support for Air Force units at Pleiku Air Base, South Vietnam since the spring of 1966. In February 1968, the 6th Air Commando Squadron, flying Douglas A-1 Skyraiders, moved to Pleiku from England Air Force Base, Louisiana and was assigned to the 14th Air Commando Wing, which was located at Nha Trang Air Base. The 633d Special Operations Wing was activated in July 1968 to act as the headquarters for both units stationed at Pleiku.

The wing engaged in special operations combat, including close air support, air escort, day and night interdiction, and visual and photographic reconnaissance from its activation until November 1969.

In November 1969 its only operational squadron was inactivated in Operation Keystone Cardinal, the first reduction in United States Air Forces combat forces as ceilings on forces in South Vietnam were reduced and the United States began to withdraw. Its Douglas A-1 Skyraiders were transferred to the 56th Special Operations Wing in Thailand. The wing managed the reduction of United States forces at Pleiku until March 1970, when it was inactivated and transferred its remaining equipment and personnel to the 6254th Air Base Squadron.

=== Consolidation and redesignation ===
In July 1985, the wing was consolidated with the 333d Bombardment Group, a World War II unit that also served in the Pacific area. The consolidated unit was designated the 333d Special Operations Wing, but has never been active under that designation.

== Lineage ==
333d Bombardment Group

- Constituted as the 333d Bombardment Group (Heavy) on 9 July 1942

Activated on 15 July 1942
Inactivated on 1 April 1944

- Redesignated 333d Bombardment Group, Very Heavy

Activated on 7 July 1944
Inactivated on 28 May 1946

- Consolidated with the 633d Special Operations Wing as the 333d Special Operations Wing on 31 July 1985

333d Special Operations Wing

- Established as the 633d Special Operations Wing and activated on 9 July 1968 (not organized)

Organized on 15 July 1968
Inactivated on 15 March 1970
Consolidated with the 333d Bombardment Group as the 333d Special Operations Wing on 31 July 1985

=== Assignments ===
- 21st Bombardment Wing, 15 Jul 1942
- Probably II Bomber Command, 21 February 1943 – 1 April 1944
- Probably II Bomber Command, 7 July 1944
- 316th Bombardment Wing (later 316th Composite Wing), by 31 August 1945 – 28 May 1946
- Pacific Air Forces, 9 July 1968 (not organized)
- Seventh Air Force, 15 July 1968 – 15 March 1970

== Components ==
Group

- 633d Combat Support Group, 15 July 1968- 15 March 1970

Squadrons

- 6th Air Commando Squadron (later 6th Special Operations Squadron), 15 July 1968 – 15 November 1969
- 466th Bombardment Squadron, 15 July 1942—1 April 1944
- 467th Bombardment Squadron, 15 July 1942—1 April 1944
- 468th Bombardment Squadron, 15 July 1942—1 April 1944
- 469th Bombardment Squadron, 15 July 1942—1 April 1944
- 435th Bombardment Squadron, 7 July 1944 – 28 May 1946
- 460th Bombardment Squadron, 7 July 1944 – 28 May 1946
- 507th Bombardment Squadron, 7 July 1944 – 28 May 1946
- 633d Consolidated Aircraft Maintenance Squadron, 15 July 1968 – 15 March 1970

Other

- 31st Photo Laboratory, c. 7 July 1944 – c. 28 May 1946
- 633d USAF infirmary, 15 July 1968 – 15 March 1970

=== Stations ===
- Topeka Army Air Base, Kansas, 15 July 1942
- Dalhart Army Air Field, Texas, 22 February 1943 – 1 April 1944
- Dalhart Army Air Field, Texas, 7 July 1944
- Great Bend Army Air Field, Kansas, 13 January – 18 June 1945
- Kadena Air Base, Okinawa 5 August 1945 – 28 May 1946
- Pleiku Air Base, South Vietnam, 9 July 1968 – 15 March 1970

=== Aircraft ===
- Boeing B-17 Flying Fortress, 1942-1944
- Boeing B-29 Superfortress, 1944-1946
- Douglas A-1 Skyraider, 1968-1969

=== Campaigns and awards ===
| Award streamer | Award | Dates | Notes |
|---|---|---|---|
| | Air Force Outstanding Unit Award with Combat "V" Device | 15 July 1968 – 31 May 1969 | 633d Special Operations Wing |
| | Vietnamese Gallantry Cross with Palm | 15 July 1968 – 15 March 1970 | 633d Special Operations Wing |

| Campaign Streamer | Campaign | Dates | Notes |
|---|---|---|---|
| | American Theater without inscription | 15 Jul 1942 – 1 April 1944, 7 July 1944-18 Jun 45 | 333d Bombardment Group |
| | Asiatic–Pacific Theater without inscription | 5 August 1945 – 2 March 1946 | 333d Bombardment Group |
| | Vietnam Air Offensive, Phase III | 9 July 1968 – 31 October 1968 | 633d Special Operations Wing |
| | Vietnam Air Offensive, Phase IV | 1 November 1968 – 22 February 1969 | 633d Special Operations Wing |
| | Tet 1969/Counteroffensive | 23 February 1969 – 8 June 1969 | 633d Special Operations Wing |
| | Vietnam Summer-Fall 1969 | 9 June 1969 – 31 October 1969 | 633d Special Operations Wing |
| | Vietnam Winter-Spring 1970 | 3 November 1969 – 15 March 1970 | 633d Special Operations Wing |

== See also ==
- List of inactive AFCON wings of the United States Air Force
- List of A-1 Skyraider operators
- List of B-29 Superfortress operators
- B-17 Flying Fortress units of the United States Army Air Forces
