= Dalhart Army Air Base =

Dalhart Army Airfield
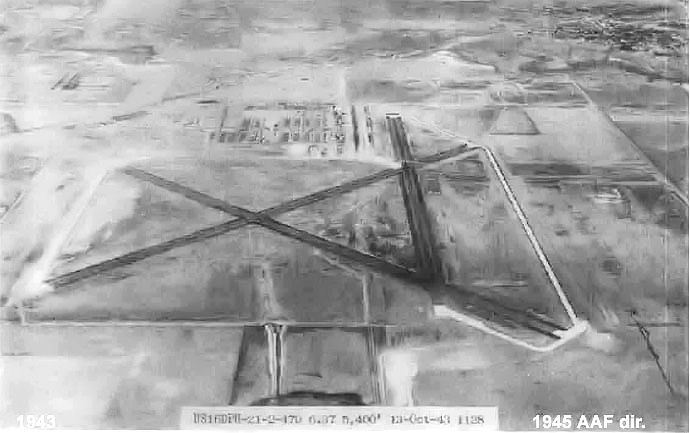
- Dalhart Army Airfield, Texas 13 October 1943
- IATA: none; ICAO: none

Summary
- Built: 1942
- In use: 1942-1945
- Coordinates: 36°01′21″N 102°32′50″W

Map
- Dalhart Army Airfield, Texas

Runways
Direction	Length		Surface
Direction	ft	m	Surface
00/18	9,388	2,861	Bituminous
06/24	9,320	2,841	Bituminous
14/32	9,320	2,841	Bituminous
- Runway information from: Military Airfields in WW2, Texas

Dalhart Army Air Base is a former World War II military airfield complex near the city of Dalhart, Texas. It operated three training sites for the United States Army Air Forces from 1943 until 1945.

The majority of the namesake city of Dalhart, Texas lies in southern Dallam County, while those parts of Dalhart city south of 11th Street are actually in northern Hartley County, Texas. The main airfield of Dalhart Army Air Base was 3.4 miles southwest of the city, so it was located in Hartley County. Auxiliary #1 (Hartley Field) was 10.2 miles west-southwest of the city, also in Hartley County. Auxiliary #2 (Dallam Field) was located 5.5 miles east-northeast of the city in Dallam County.

== History ==
=== Origins ===
In the wake of the Japanese attack on Pearl Harbor, the Dalhart Texan newspaper began asking its readers what they could do to support America's war effort. Three prominent men in Dalhart, Herman Steele, manager of the Dalhart Chamber of Commerce, along with Mayor Herbert Peeples and Elmer Elliot, manager of the DeSoto Hotel announced plans to petition the Army Air Corps to build a training base near the town.

On Wednesday, 20 May 1942, The Dalhart Texan reported they had been successful in bringing to Dalhart a new glider school. The official announcement came from Representative Eugene Worley’s office. Land for the airfield was purchased as a result of Dallam and Hartley Country issuing a bond in 1942 for the purchase of more than 3,000 acres of land southwest of Dalhart for an Army Air Corps training airfield.

Construction proceeded on the new army airfield and Dalhart Army Airfield opened in May 1942. While under construction the command's temporary headquarters operated from a tent city in Amarillo. During the summer of 1942 three runways were laid down along with a large parking ramp and taxiway system. Four large hangars along with support buildings, barracks a street network, electric, sewer and water lines were constructed. On 1 July 1942, the still uncompleted airfield was assigned to the Central Flying Training Command, being under the jurisdiction of the Army Air Forces Glider School. In September 1942, Cadets began arriving for training at the school.

=== Operations ===
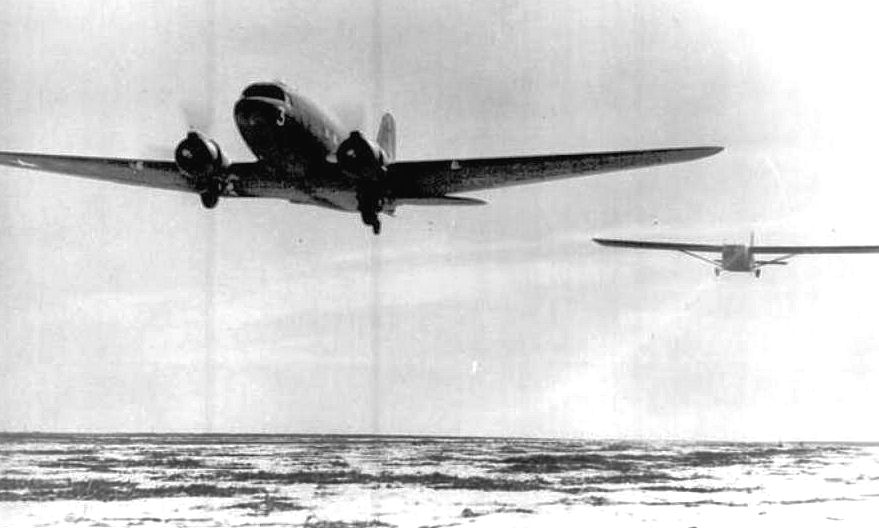
CG-4 Glider being towed by a C-47 Skytrain transport at Dalhart, 1943

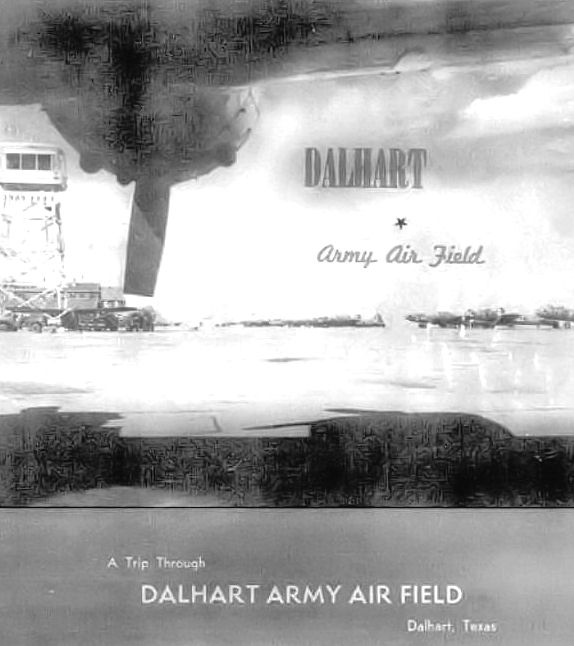
1944 Dalhart AAF guide

Glider training was performed by the 14th Troop Carrier Squadron, which arrived on 9 October 1942 with C-47 Skytrains being used for tow planes. The 878th, 879th and 880th Glider Training Squadrons were established at the base, equipped with the new Waco CG-4A "Hadrian" Glider. Cadets honed their skills, takeoff, and towed flight on a 350' nylon rope behind a C-47 Skytrain tow plane. The pilots held their position with two gliders being double towed. Also gliders were prepared on the ground for being snatched by a tow aircraft flying overhead. Cadets also were trained in infantry skills, as they were expected to serve as combat soldiers after landing.

In February 1943, Dalhart was transferred to Second Air Force, which placed the base under the jurisdiction of II Bomber Command. The new mission of the base was to be B-17 Flying Fortress and B-24 Liberator Heavy Bomber aircrew replacement training. Graduates of the training would then be assigned to new combat groups or be sent directly to the European Theater of Operations (ETO) for assignment as replacements. On 21 February, the 46th Bombardment Training Wing was organized at the base. In March 1943, the Glider School was transferred to South Plains Army Airfield near Lubbock.

The 333d Bombardment Group became the Replacement Training Unit (RTU). Cadets flew training missions over practice target areas in the Texas Panhandle. Along with the 333d, the Third Air Force 415th Bombardment Group trained medium bomber pilots in A-20 Havoc, A-26 Invader and B-25 Mitchell medium Bombers. Fighter cadets were also trained in P-39 Airacobras and A-24 Banshee Dive Bombers. The 415th utilized the Hartley (#1) and Dallum (#2) satellite airfields for training leaving the main base to the heavy four-engine bomber training.

In March 1944, the mission of Dalhart was again changed to B-29 Superfortress training as crews were needed in the Pacific Theater for the strategic bombardment of Japan. Second Air Force took over control of the base directly, with the 16th Bombardment Training Wing taking over training from the 46th on 1 March 1944. Along with the B-29 training, Second Air Force also organized the 72d Fighter Wing at Dalhart, with the 347th Fighter Group and 507th Fighter Groups taking over the Hartley and Dallam airfields. The 347th trained P-38 Lightning pilots and the 507th P-47N Thunderbolt pilots in very long range escort missions to support XX Bomber Command B-29 Superfortresses on strategic bombardment missions to the Japanese Home Islands.

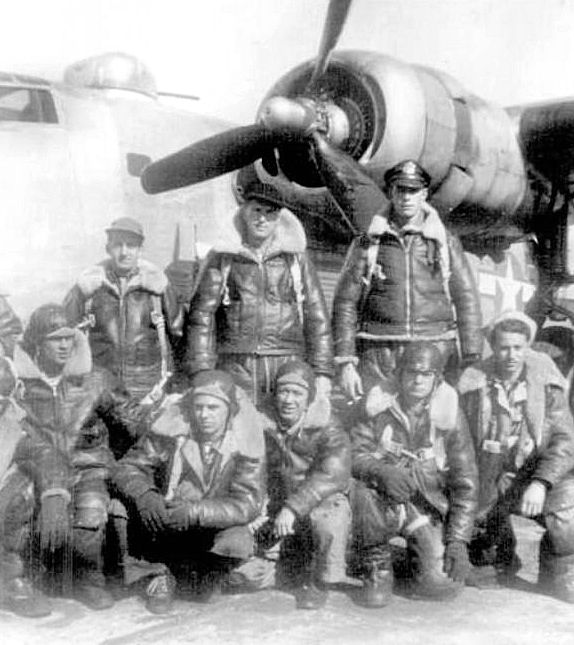
Graduating B-24 Liberator aircrew, 1944

Several groups trained in B-29s, one of which, the 393d Bomb Squadron, 504th Bombardment Group, was later selected by Colonel Paul W. Tibbets, Jr., to serve as the core of an experimental unit. The 393d was the first and only squadron to fly missions with Atomic Bombs and attack Hiroshima and Nagasaki, Japan in August 1945.

=== Closure ===
With the end of the war in September 1945, Second Air Force training ended and Dalhart became a storage depot for surplus aircraft. Control transferred to Air Technical Service Command on 1 January 1945. During 1946 all useful military equipment was transferred from the three airfields in the area and buildings were dismantled and sold. The airfield was transferred to the War Assets Administration and the property went to the city of Dalhart. Since that time, several of the remaining buildings have been used as the Dalhart Municipal Airport.

=== Major Commands to Which Assigned ===
- Central Flying Training Command, 1 July 1942
- II Bomber Command, 1 February 1943
- Second Air Force, 1 March 1944 – 31 December 1945

=== Major units assigned ===
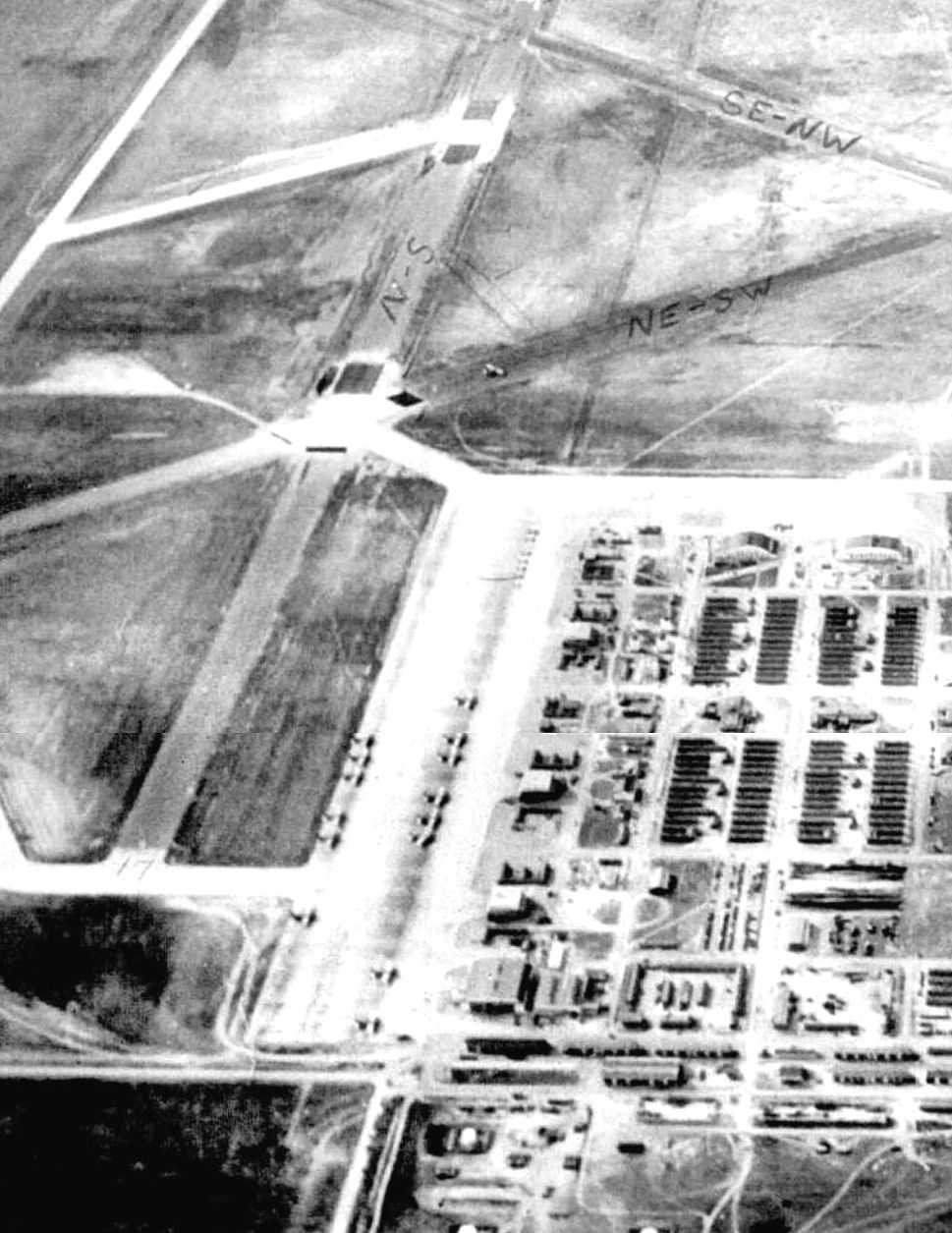
Portion of runway pattern, parking ramp and eastern section of station area, 1944

- 14th Troop Carrier Squadron (9 October 1942 – 27 February 1943) (C-47)
- 46th Bombardment Training Wing, 21 February 1943 – 1 March 1944
- 333d Bombardment Group (B-17 Flying Fortress, B-24 Liberator) (RTU)

466th Bombardment Squadron (22 February 1943-1 April 1944)
467th Bombardment Squadron (22 February 1943-1 April 1944)
468th Bombardment Squadron (22 February 1943-1 April 1944)
469th Bombardment Squadron (22 February 1943-1 April 1944)

- 415th Bombardment Group ( A-20's, A-24's, A-26's, B-25's, and P-39 RTU)

465th Bombardment Squadron: 23 March 1943 – 5 April 1944
521st Fighter-Bomber (formerly 667th) Bombardment Squadron: 15 February 1943 – 5 April 1944

- 23d Fighter Squadron (27 October-24 December 1943) (P-39, P-40)
- 72d Fighter Wing, 1 April-30 May 1945
- 347th Fighter Group (18 August 1944 – 18 January 1945) (P-38 Lighting)
- 507th Fighter Group (15 December 1944 – 24 April 1945) (P-47N Thunderbolt)
- 16th Bombardment Training Wing, 1 March 1944 – 30 September 1945
- 6th Bombardment Group (19 April-19 May 1944)
- 9th Bombardment Group (9 March-19 May 1944)
- 331st Bombardment Group (12 July-14 November 1944)
- 333d Bombardment Group (7 July 1944 – 13 January 1945)
- 382d Bombardment Group (25 August-11 December 1944)
- 383d Bombardment Group (28 August 1944 – 14 January 1945)
- 449th Bombardment Group (24 July-8 September 1945)
- 502d Bombardment Group (5 June-26 September 1944)

References for unit assignments:

=== Auxiliary airfields ===
==== Hartley Field ====
Hartley Field West Field
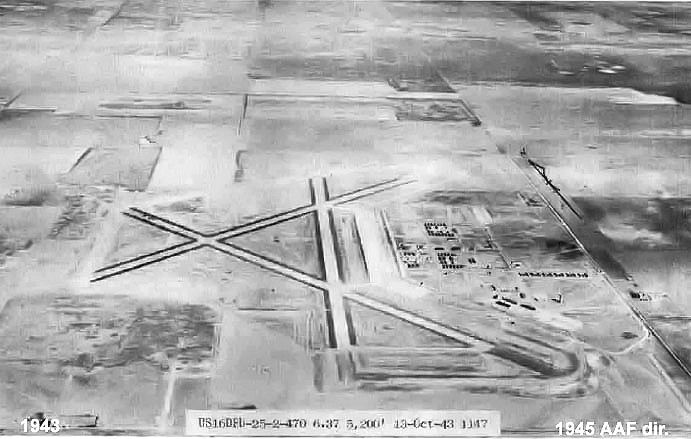
- Hartley Field, Dalhart Auxiliary #1 13 October 1943.
- IATA: none; ICAO: none

Summary
- Built: 1942
- In use: 1942-1945
- Coordinates: 36°01′19″N 102°41′22″W
- Interactive map of Hartley Field

Runways
Direction	Length		Surface
Direction	ft	m	Surface
00/18	8,000	2,438	Bituminous
06/24	8,000	2,438	Bituminous
14/32	8,000	2,438	Bituminous
- Runway information from: Military Airfields in WW2, Texas

Located about 8 miles west of Dalhart AAF, Hartley Field was built as one of two auxiliary fields for Dalhart.

Built during 1942, it was initially designated as "West Field" and had three 8,000' paved runways, with a large paved ramp and hangar on the east side. Hartley also had a substantial number of support buildings on a street grid to the east of the ramp. Hartley Field was initially used as an auxiliary field for the glider training school at Dalhart, then later taken over by Third Air Force for twin-engine medium bomber training by the 415th Bombardment Group. The 465th Bombardment Squadron operated A-20 Havocs and A-26 Invaders from the airfield between March 1943 and April 1944.

When B-29 training began at Dalhart in March 1944, Hartley was taken over by the Second Air Force 72d Fighter Wing. The 347th Fighter Group began training P-38 Lightning pilots from the field in August for long-range escort missions of B-29s in the Pacific. Training ended in January 1945 and it became an emergency landing field for B-29s. With the end of the war, many surplus aircraft were stored on the airfield.

Closed at the end of 1945, eventually the buildings were sold, although title remained with the Army and later United States Air Force. The entire facility was sold at some point between 1949 and 1963. Today, several of the runways are largely intact along with a large parking ramp. Some buildings remain along with the walls of a hangar. Much of the land is grass prairie, with many broken-up concrete foundations found in the former station area. The former street pattern is visible in aerial photography along with the locations of former buildings. The facility is in private hands behind a locked gate and is not accessible to the public.

==== Dallam Field ====
Dallam Field East Field
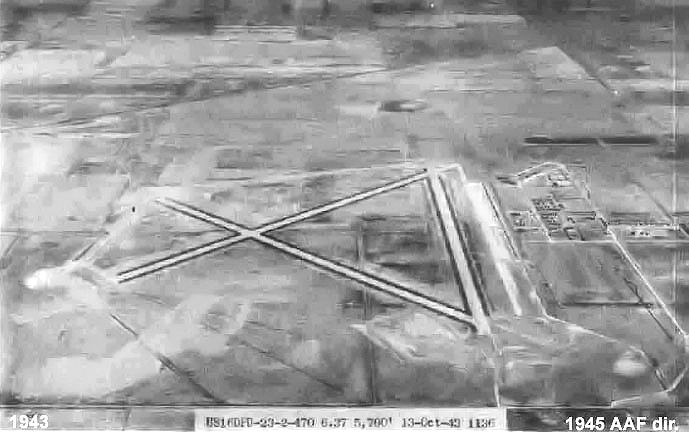
- Dallam Field, Dalhart Auxiliary #2, 13 October 1943
- IATA: none; ICAO: none

Summary
- Built: 1942
- In use: 1942–2002
- Coordinates: 36°05′37″N 102°25′24″W
- Interactive map of Dallam Field

Runways
Direction	Length		Surface
Direction	ft	m	Surface
00/18	8,000	2,438	Bituminous
06/24	8,000	2,438	Bituminous
14/32	8,000	2,438	Bituminous
- Runway information from: Military Airfields in WW2, Texas

Dallam Field is located about 9 miles northeast of Dalhart AAF, and was built in 1942 as one of two auxiliary fields for Dalhart.

It was initially designated as "East Field" and had three 8,000-foot paved runways, with a large paved ramp and hangar on the east side. Dallam also had a substantial number of support buildings on a street grid to the east of the ramp. Its history is similar to Hartley Field, being an auxiliary glider airfield in 1942, and used by the 415th Bombardment Group 521st Fighter-Bomber Squadron. The 521st performed initially A-24 Banshee dive bomber training, then switched to P-39 Airacobra fighter pilot replacement training later in 1943. With Second Air Force taking over the field in December 1944, the 507th Fighter Group used the field for P-47N Thunderbolt escort pilot training for a few months until training ended at the end of April, 1945.

Dallam was used for storage and placed in an inactive state after the end of the war, although it apparently was used in some manner by the 3320th Technical Training Wing at Amarillo AFB during the Korean War and in the 1950s. It was closed sometime around 1963 and sold off.

During the 1960s, it was reopened as "Miller Field Airport" (FAA code: 2E1) and was used for general aviation. The three main runways were removed and sold for hardcore during the 1970s, the majority of the airfield and station areas being sold off to agricultural interests. Miller Field Airport had one 6,500-foot runway (17/35) along with a fixed-base operator providing fuel and general aviation repairs. It was listed as being owned by a Mr Delmer Miller in 1985.

During the 1980s Miller Field was used by drug smugglers who flew cocaine out of Mexico in general aviation aircraft. They would fly over Miller field, and drop below FAA Radar for a few cycles to dump the drugs out to smugglers waiting on the ground who would then pick up the drugs and drive off with them and sell them on.

In 2002, the FAA showed Miller Field was active with four aircraft based at it. However, it was abandoned in the early 2000s and today the large concrete parking ramp remains, and a few abandoned buildings, in various states of disrepair. The former World War II hangar walls still stand. The former airport is still in use by crop dusters. Some concrete foundations and the remains of some wartime streets can still be seen in aerial photography. What looks like a tree farm and a large number of agricultural vehicles and a large metal building are also located on the former station area.

== See also ==
- Texas World War II Army Airfields
