= Cathay Pacific =

Flag carrier of Hong Kong

Cathay Pacific 國泰航空

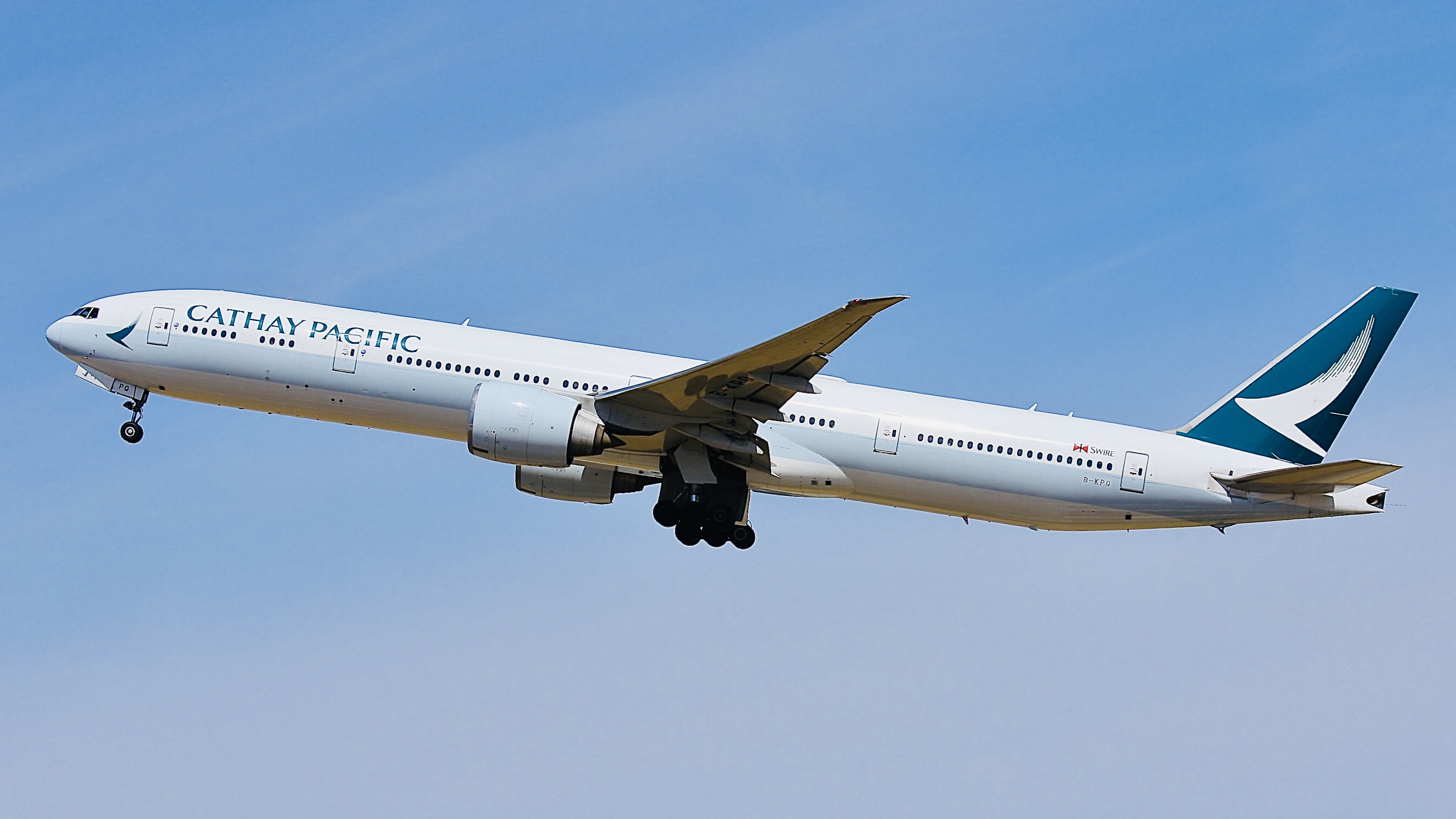
- A Cathay Pacific Boeing 777-300ER
IATA	ICAO	Call sign
CX	CPA	CATHAY
- Founded: 24 September 1946; 80 years ago
- AOC #: 1
- Hubs: Hong Kong
- Focus cities: Taipei–Taoyuan
- Frequent-flyer program: Asia Miles
- Alliance: Oneworld
- Subsidiaries: Air Hong Kong; HK Express
- Fleet size: 180 (incl cargo)
- Destinations: 83 (incl cargo)
- Traded as: SEHK: 293
- Headquarters: Cathay City, Hong Kong International Airport, Hong Kong
- Key people: Patrick Healy (chairman); Ronald Lam (CEO)
- Founders: Sydney de Kantzow; Roy Farrell
- Revenue: ▲HK$116.766 billion (2025)
- Operating income: ▲HK$14.458 billion (2025)
- Profit: ▲HK$9.888 billion (2025)
- Total equity: ▲HK$10.828 billion (2025)
- Employees: 25.381 (2025)
- Website: www.cathaypacific.com

Cathay Pacific Airways Limited
- Traditional Chinese: 國泰航空公司
- Simplified Chinese: 国泰航空公司
- Literal meaning: Cathay Aviation Limited Company
Transcriptions
Standard Mandarin
- Hanyu Pinyin: Guótài Hángkōng gōngsī
Yue: Cantonese
- Yale Romanization: Gwoktaai Hòhnghūng Gūngsī
- Jyutping: Gwok3taai3 Hong4hung1 6gung1si1

Cathay Pacific Airlines
- Traditional Chinese: 國泰航空
- Simplified Chinese: 国泰航空
- Literal meaning: Cathay Aviation
Transcriptions
Standard Mandarin
- Hanyu Pinyin: Guótài Hángkōng
Hakka
- Romanization: Get^{5}(or gok^{5})tai^{4} Hong^{2}kung^{1}
Yue: Cantonese
- Yale Romanization: Gwoktaai Hòhnghūng
- Jyutping: Gwok3taai3 Hong4hung1

Brand name in Chinese
- Traditional Chinese: 國泰
- Simplified Chinese: 国泰
- Literal meaning: country (being) prosperous / Cathay
Transcriptions
Standard Mandarin
- Hanyu Pinyin: Guótài
Yue: Cantonese
- Yale Romanization: Gwoktaai
- Jyutping: Gwok3taai3

Cathay Pacific Airways Limited, or simply Cathay Pacific, is the flag carrier of Hong Kong, with its head office and main hub located at Hong Kong International Airport. The airline's operations and its subsidiaries have scheduled passenger and cargo services to more than 190 destinations and more than 60 countries worldwide including codeshares and joint ventures.

Cathay Pacific operates a fleet consisting of Airbus A321neo, Airbus A330, Airbus A350, and Boeing 777 aircraft. Cathay Cargo (previously Cathay Pacific Cargo) operates two models of Boeing 747, the B747-400ERF and B747-8F. Defunct wholly owned subsidiary airline Cathay Dragon, which ceased operations in 2020, operated to 44 destinations in the Asia-Pacific region from its Hong Kong base. In 2010, Cathay Pacific and Cathay Cargo, together with Cathay Dragon, transported nearly 27 million passengers and more than 1.8 million tons of cargo and mail.

Cathay Pacific was founded on 24 September 1946 by Australian Sydney H. de Kantzow and American Roy C. Farrell. As of May 2026, its major shareholders are Swire Pacific and Air China.

Cathay Pacific is one of the founding members of Oneworld alliance. As of 2025, Skytrax ranks the airline as a 5-star airline and as the third best airline in the world.

== History ==
=== 1946–1960: The early years ===
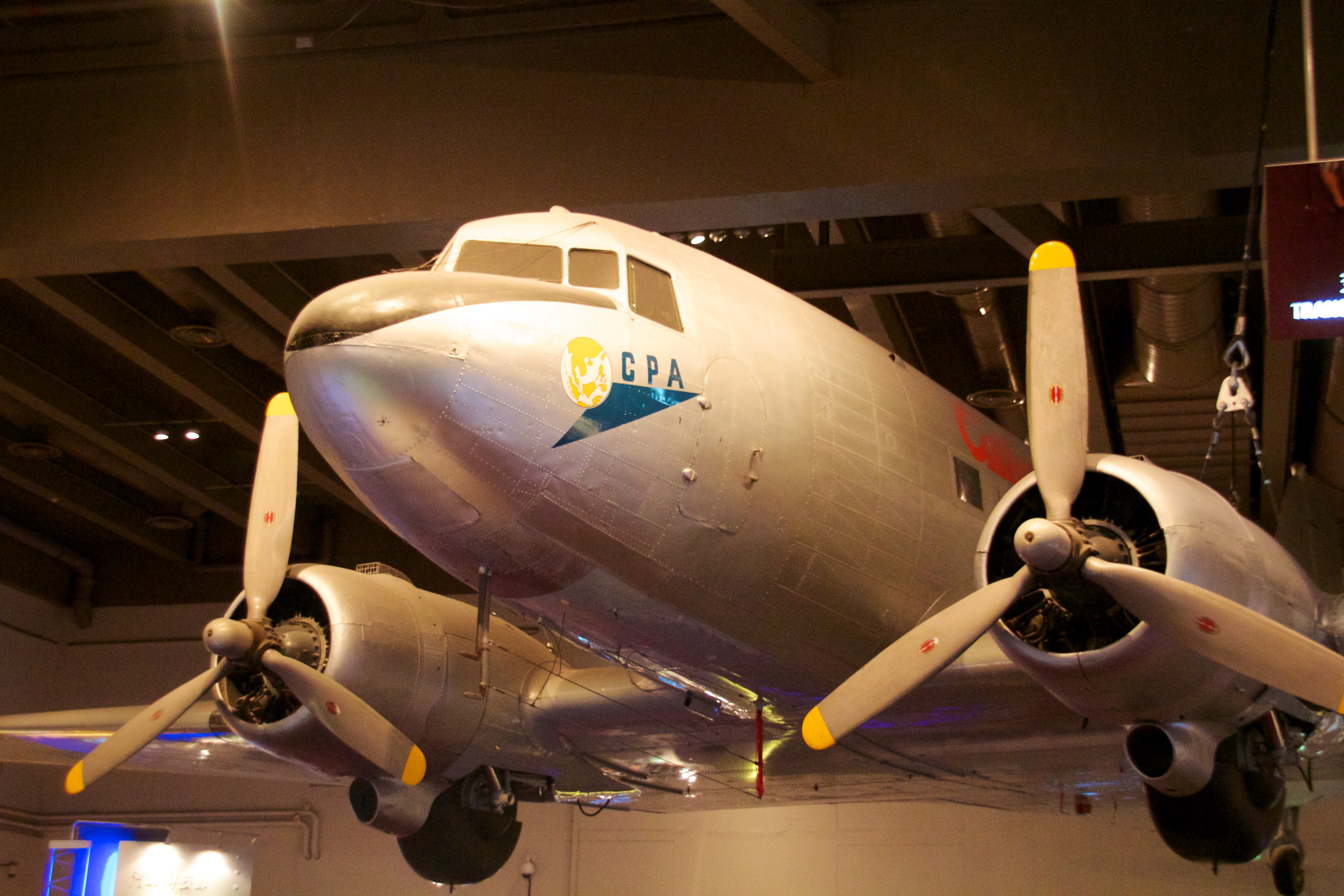
A Douglas DC-3 named Betsy, Cathay Pacific's first aircraft, in the Hong Kong Science Museum

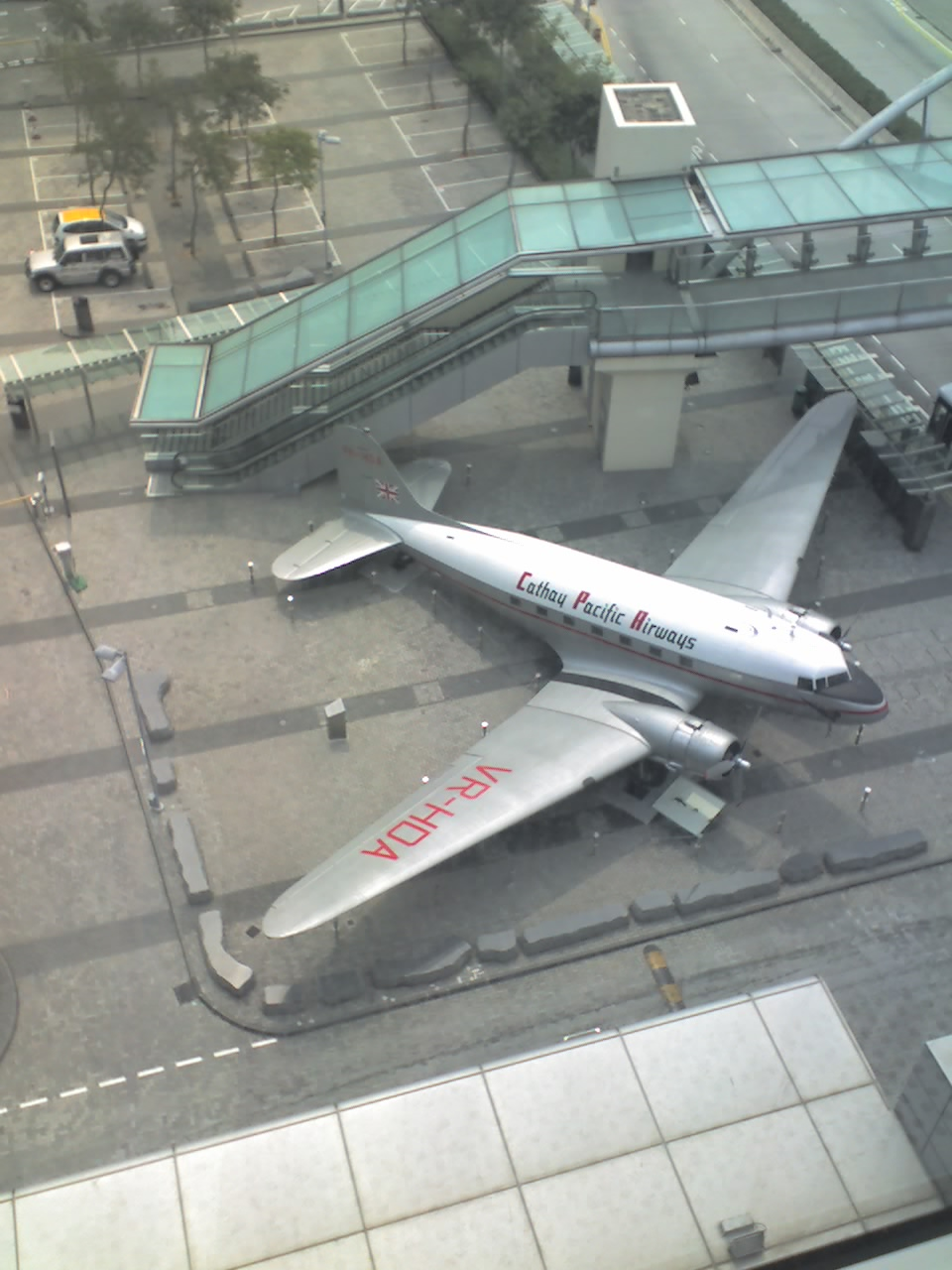
Niki, a DC-3 painted to imitate the appearance of the carrier's second aircraft, outside Cathay City

Cathay Pacific Airways was founded on 24 September 1946 in Hong Kong. Sydney "Syd" de Kantzow, Roy Farrell, Neil Buchanan, Donald Brittan Evans and Robert "Bob" Stanley Russell were the initial shareholders. Buchanan and Russell had already worked for de Kantzow and Farrell at Roy Farrell Import-Export Company, the predecessor of Cathay Pacific, that was initially headquartered in Shanghai. Both de Kantzow and Farrell were Ex-Air Force pilots who had flown The Hump, a route over the Himalayan mountains. Farrell purchased the airline's first aircraft, a Douglas DC-3, nicknamed Betsy, at Bush Field, New York City in 1945. The company began freight services on 28 January 1950 from Sydney to Shanghai, after Farrell and Russell flew the plane to Australia and obtained a licence to carry freight (but not passengers) earlier that month. Its first commercial flight was a shipment of Australian goods. The profitable business soon attracted attention from Republic of China government officials. After several instances where the company's planes were detained by authorities in Shanghai, on 11 May 1946, the company relocated, flying its two planes to Hong Kong. Farrell and de Kantzow re-registered their business in Hong Kong on 24 September 1946 as Cathay Pacific Airways Limited, while another sister company, The Roy Farrell Export Import Company (Hong Kong) Limited, was incorporated on 28 August 1946 and chartered some flights from Cathay. (According to International Directory of Company Histories, two companies were formed for tax purposes.)

They named the airline Cathay, the ancient name given to China, and Pacific because Farrell speculated that they would one day fly across the Pacific (which happened in the 1970s), and, moreover, to avoid the name "Air Cathay" as it had already been used in a comic. The Chinese name for the company ("國泰") was not settled on until the 1950s. It comes from a Chinese idiom meaning "Peace and Prosperity" and was at the time often used by other businesses called "Cathay" in English.

According to legend, the airline's unique name was conceived by Farrell and some foreign correspondents at the bar of the Manila Hotel, while another narrative was the name was taken in the Cathay Hotel in Shanghai Bund, during drinking and brainstorming, and choosing Cathay was to avoid the word China in the airline name. On Cathay Pacific's maiden voyage, de Kantzow and Peter Hoskins flew from Sydney to Hong Kong via Manila. The airline initially flew routes between Hong Kong, Sydney, Manila, Singapore, Shanghai, Saigon, and Bangkok, with additional chartered destinations. The airline grew quickly. By 1947, it had added another five DC-3s and two Vickers Catalina seaplanes to its fleet.

In 1948, a new legal person of Cathay Pacific Airways was incorporated, with John Swire & Sons (now known as Swire Group), China Navigation Company, Australian National Airways being the new shareholders of the new entity, acquiring the assets from the old legal person; the old legal person, was renamed into Cathay Pacific Holdings, as well as retaining 10% shares of the new Cathay Pacific Airways. de Kantzow, Farrell and Russell were the shareholders of Cathay Pacific Holdings at that time. It was reported that the colonial British government of Hong Kong required the airline was majority-owned by the British. Despite de Kantzow being a British subject through his Australian roots, Farrell was an American, thus forcing them to sell their majority stake. Under Swire's management, de Kantzow remained in the airline until 1951, while Farrell had sold his minority stake in Cathay Pacific soon after Swire's takeover in 1948, due to his wife's health problems. He returned to Texas and became a successful businessman.

Swire later acquired 52% of Cathay Pacific Airways. As of 31 December 2017, the airline is still owned by Swire Group to the extent of 45% through its subsidiary Swire Pacific Limited, as the largest shareholder. However, Swire Group also formed a shareholders' agreement with the second largest shareholder, Air China (which was controlled by state-owned China National Aviation Holding), which Cathay Pacific and Air China had a cross ownership.

In the late 1940s, the Hong Kong Government divided the local aviation market between Cathay Pacific and its only local competitor, the Jardine Matheson-owned Hong Kong Airways: Cathay Pacific was allocated routes to the south (including South-East Asia and Australia), while Hong Kong Airways was allocated routes to the north (including mainland China, Korea, and Japan). The situation changed with the establishment of the People's Republic of China and the Korean War, which reduced the viability of the northern routes. In 1959, Cathay Pacific acquired Hong Kong Airways, and became the dominant airline in Hong Kong.

Under Swire, another significant sister company, HAECO, was established in 1950. It has since become one of the major aeroplane repair service companies of Hong Kong with divisions in other cities of China, such as Xiamen, Beijing, Shanghai, Chengdu, and Chongqing.

=== 1960–1990: Expansion ===
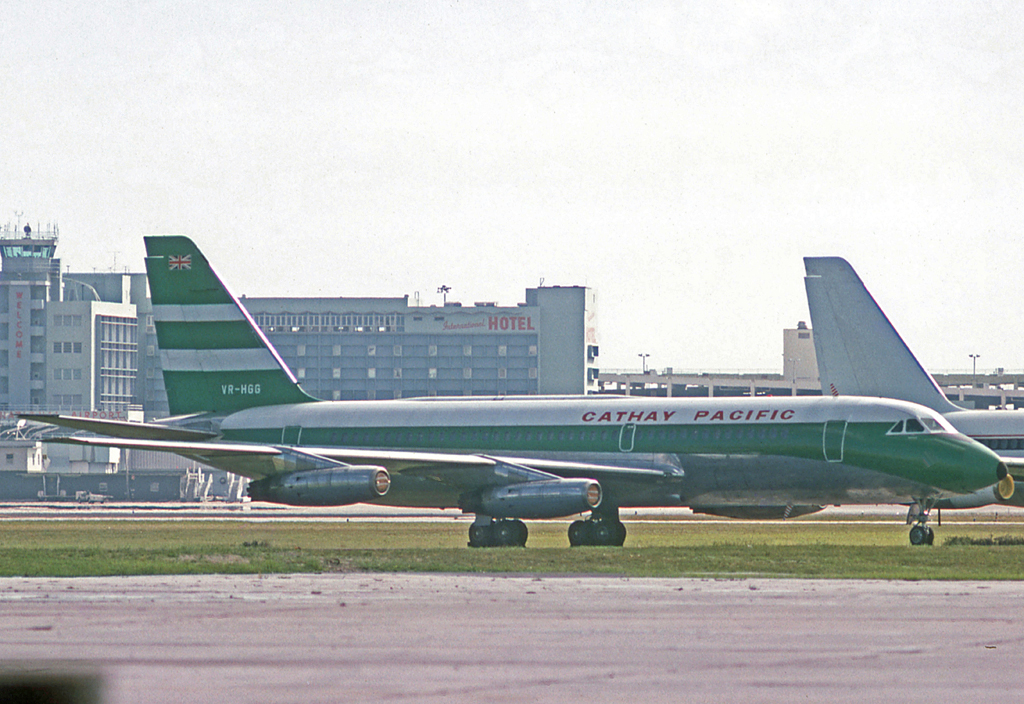
A Cathay Pacific Convair 880, operating from 1964 until 1974

The airline thrived during the late 1950s and into the 1960s, culminating in its acquisition of Hong Kong Airways on 1 July 1959. Between 1962 and 1967, the airline recorded double digit growth on average every year and became one of the world's first airlines to operate international services to Fukuoka, Nagoya and Osaka in Japan. In 1964, it carried its one millionth passenger and acquired its first jet engine aircraft, the Convair 880. In 1967, it became an all jet airline with the replacement of its last Lockheed L-188 Electra with a Convair 880.

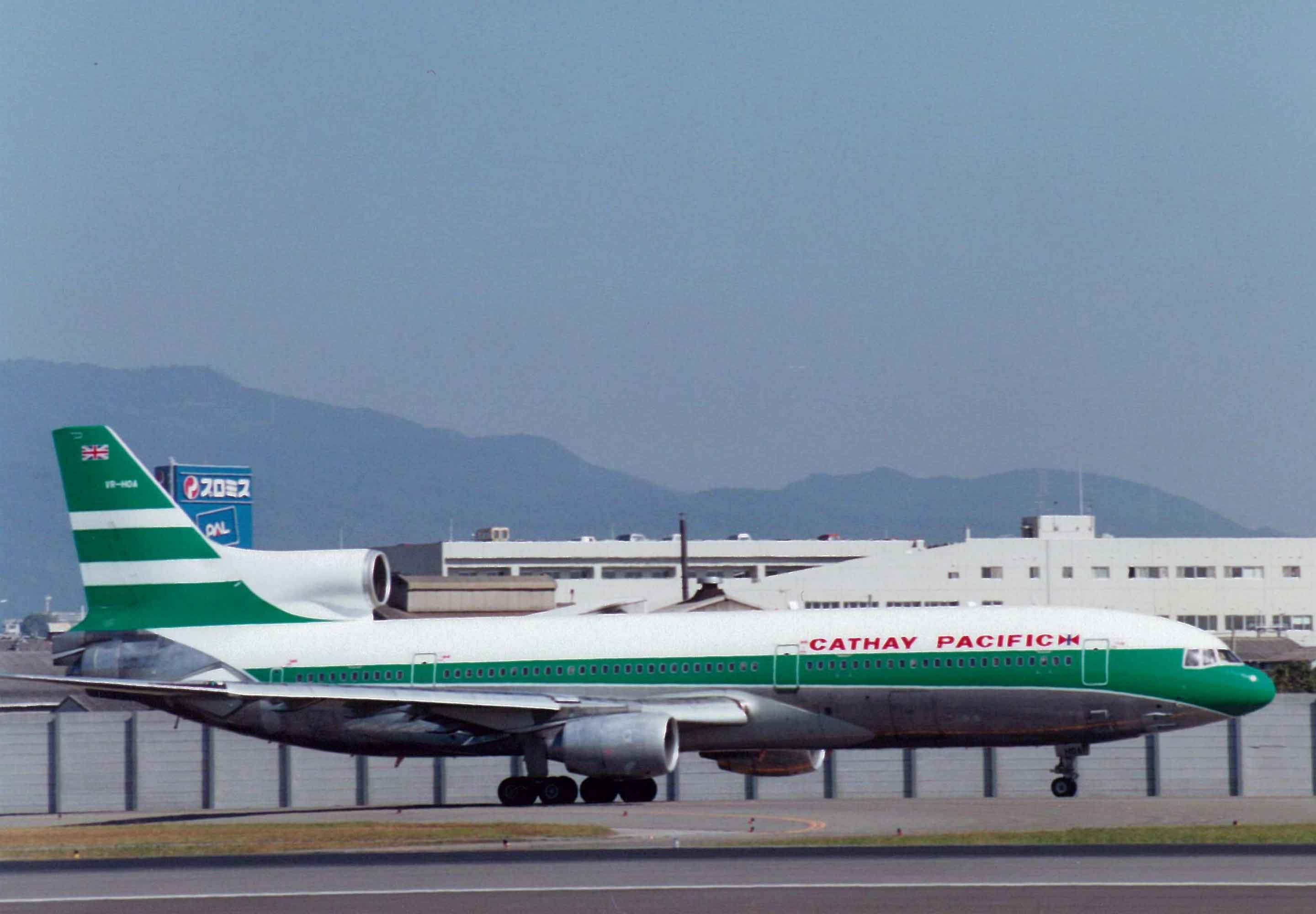
A Lockheed L-1011 TriStar at Osaka International Airport in 1972–1994 livery with the British Union Flag and the logo of parent company Swire

In the 1970s, Cathay Pacific installed a computerised reservation system and flight simulators. In 1971, Cathay Pacific Airways received the first Boeing aircraft 707-320B. By 1972, it had five 707s. The new aircraft colour was known as Brunswick green. In July 1976, it began operating a Boeing 707 freighter from Hong Kong to Seoul, Bangkok and Singapore.

In 1974, Cathay Pacific almost purchased the McDonnell Douglas DC-10 to open a new flight route. During the flight route application process with the British government, due to the pressure from the British government, Cathay Pacific changed the application to apply for a route from Hong Kong to London using a Boeing 747. The application was ultimately rejected. In 1979, the airline acquired its first Boeing 747 and applied for traffic rights to fly to London in 1980, with the first flight taking place on 16 July.

Expansion continued into the 1980s. In 1982, Cathay Pacific Airways introduced Cathay Pacific Cargo (now Cathay Cargo), which provided cargo service to initiate the trend of Hong Kong becoming one of the largest re-export trading ports of the world. The airline's long-haul dedicated cargo services started a twice a week with Hong Kong-Frankfurt-London service operated jointly with Lufthansa. Cathay Pacific kept its service to Vancouver in 1983, with service on to San Francisco in 1986, when an industry-wide boom encouraged route growth to many European and North American centres including London, Brisbane, Frankfurt, Amsterdam, Rome, Paris, Zurich and Manchester.

On 15 May 1986, the airline went public and was listed in the Main Board of the Stock Exchange of Hong Kong.

=== 1990–2000: Rebranding, renewal, and Oneworld ===
In January 1990, Cathay Pacific and its parent company, Swire, acquired a 35% shareholding in Dragonair, and a 75% stake in cargo airline Air Hong Kong in 1994. In 1994, the airline launched a program to upgrade its passenger service, including a HK$23 million program to update its image. Its logo was updated in 1994, and again in 2014.

The airline began a fleet replacement program in the mid-1990s, which cost a total of US$9 billion. In 1996, CITIC Pacific increased its holdings in Cathay Pacific from 10% to 25%, and two other Chinese companies, CNAC(G) and CTS, also bought substantial holdings, while the Swire Group holding was reduced to 44%. According to the International Directory of Company Histories, the sale of a 12.5% stake of Cathay Pacific by Swire Pacific to a Chinese state-owned company was regarded "as evidence of China's sincerity in maintaining the prosperity of Hong Kong."

In 1997, Cathay Pacific updated the registration numbers and flags on its fleet in conjunction with the handover of Hong Kong from the United Kingdom to China. On 21 May 1998, Cathay Pacific took the first delivery of the Boeing 777-300 at a ceremony in Everett. On 21 September 1998, Cathay Pacific, together with American Airlines, British Airways, Canadian Airlines, and Qantas, co-founded Oneworld airline alliance. Cathay Pacific temporarily took over the domestic and international operations of Philippine Airlines during its two-week shutdown from 26 September to 7 October 1998. The airline was hurt by the 1997 Asian financial crisis, but recorded a record HK$5 billion profit in 2000.

==== Transfer to Chek Lap Kok and transpolar flights ====
On 5 July 1998, Cathay Pacific operated its last flight from Kai Tak International Airport to London Heathrow Airport, with the former airport ceasing operations after more than 73 years of operation. The next day, Cathay Pacific began flights from New York John F. Kennedy International Airport to the new Hong Kong-Chek Lap Kok International Airport. This flight was also the world's first nonstop transpolar flight from New York to Hong Kong.

=== 2000–2010: Industrial troubles and acquisitions ===
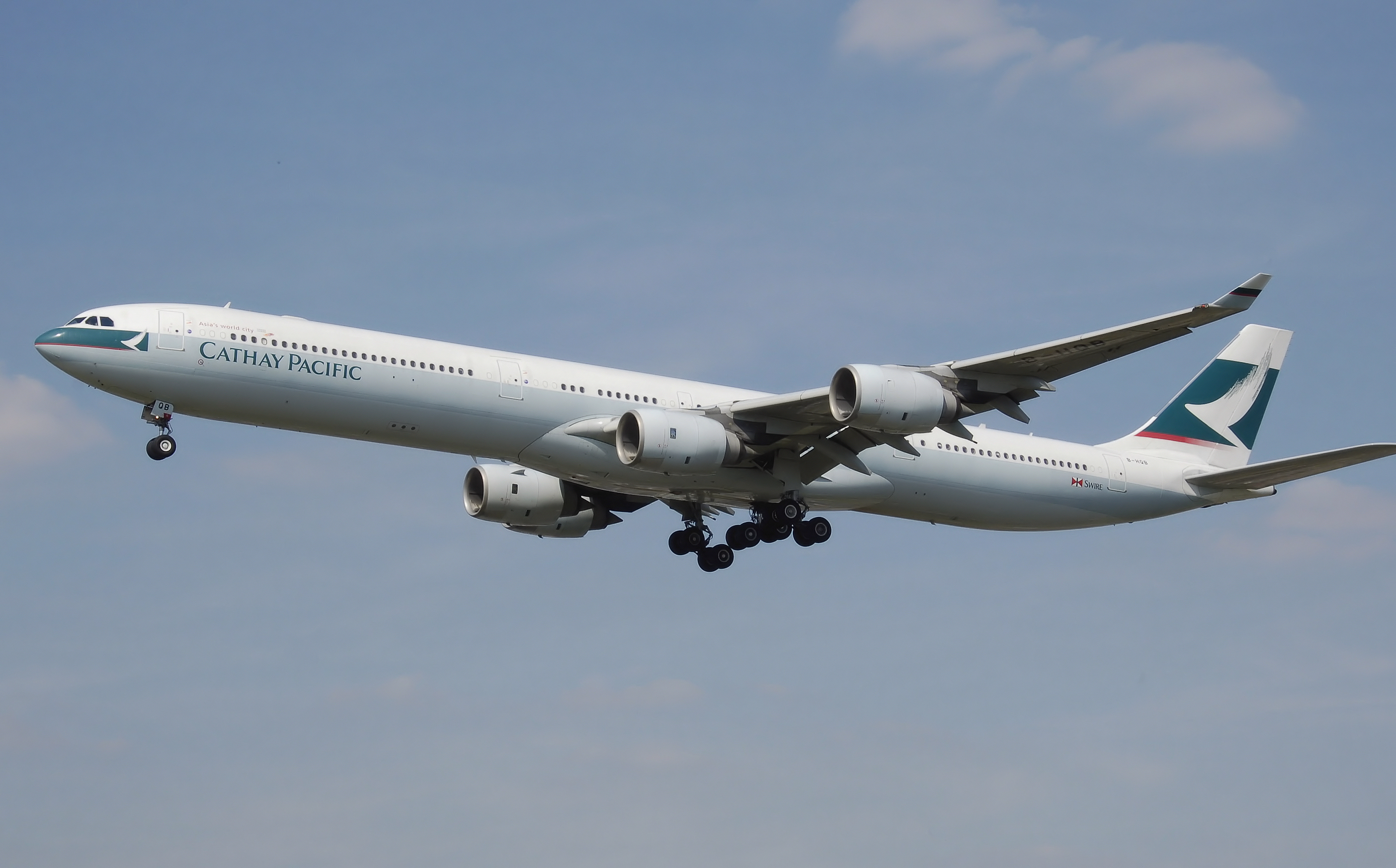
Cathay Pacific operated three Airbus A340-600s from 2002 to 2009.

The year 2000 saw Cathay Pacific experience labour relations issues while completing the acquisition of Dragonair.

==== The 49ers – employment dispute ====
In 2001, the Hong Kong Aircrew Officers Association (HKAOA) launched a "work to rule" campaign to further its campaign for pay improvements and changes to roster scheduling practices. The action involved pilots refusing to work flights that were not scheduled on their roster. Although this alone did not cause extensive disruption, rostered pilots began to call in sick for their flights. Combined with the work-to-rule campaign, the airline was unable to cover all of its scheduled flights, and cancellations resulted. Cathay Pacific steadfastly refused to negotiate with the HKAOA under threat of industrial action.

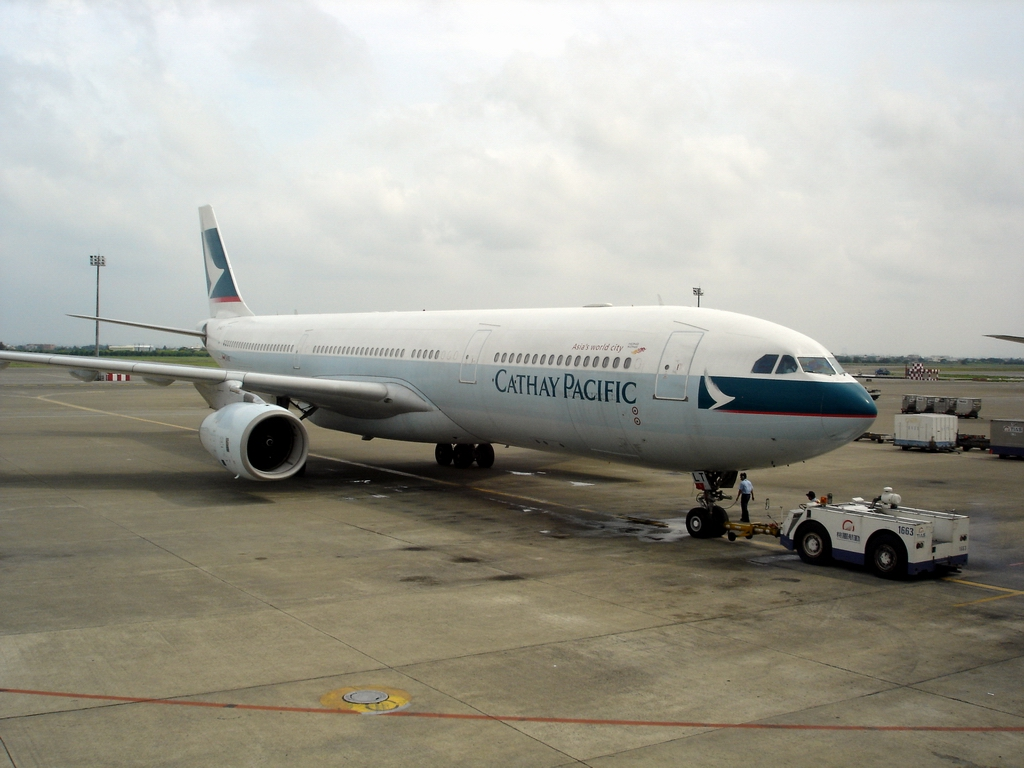
A Cathay Pacific Airbus A330-300 at Taiwan Taoyuan International Airport

On 9 July 2001, reportedly following a comprehensive review of the employment histories of all its pilots, the company fired 49 of its 1,500 pilots. This group became known colloquially as "the 49ers". Nearly half of the fired pilots were captains, representing five percent of the total pilot group. Of the 21 officers of the HKAOA, nine were fired, including four of the seven union negotiators.

Then-HKAOA president Captain Nigel Demery took the view that "the firing was pure intimidation, a union-bust straight up, designed to be random enough to put the fear in all pilots that they might be next, no reason given". The dismissals were challenged in a number of legal proceedings, but none were reinstated. The airline later offered the 49 pilots it terminated in 2001 the chance to reapply for pilot positions with its cargo division, guaranteeing such applicants first interviews, subject to passing psychometric testing. Nineteen former employees applied and twelve were offered jobs.

On 11 November 2009, 18 of the 49ers succeeded in the Hong Kong Court of First Instance concerning their joint claims for breach of contract, breach of the Employment Ordinance, and defamation.

Judge Anselmo Reyes ruled that the airline had contravened the Employment Ordinance by dismissing the pilots without a valid reason, adding that they had been sacked primarily because of union activities. He also held that remarks by then-chief operating officer Philip Chen Nanlok and current chief executive Tony Tyler after the sackings were defamatory. The judge handed the pilots a victory in their long-running legal battle, with individual awards of HK$3.3 million for defamation together with a month's pay and HK$150,000 for the sackings.

On 24 December 2010, judges Frank Stock, Susan Kwan and Johnson Lam of the Court of Appeal overturned the judgment of the lower court to the extent that the claim for wrongful termination of the contract was dismissed. The finding that Cathay Pacific wrongly sacked the 18 pilots for their union activities was upheld. The court upheld the defamation claim but reduced the damages for the defamatory comments made by Cathay Pacific management. The judges also modified the judgment awarding payment of legal costs to the pilots and instead said that they should now pay some of Cathay's costs.

The leader of the 49er Plaintiffs, Captain John Warham, launched a book titled The 49ers – The True Story on 25 March 2011.

The pilots were awarded leave on 26 October 2011 to take their case to the Court of Final Appeal. The matter was heard before Hon. Mr. Justices Bokhary, Chan and Ribeiro who are all Permanent Judges of the Court of Final Appeal. The matters to be decided upon by the Court concerned wrongful termination of contract and the level of damages for defamation. The case was heard by the Court of Final Appeal on 27 August 2012.

On 26 September 2012, 11 years after they were sacked, the 49ers were finally judged to have won the 3 prime issues of their legal case: breach of contract, breach of the Employment Ordinance, and defamation. The Court of Final Appeal agreed with the Court of Appeal's methodology for reducing the defamation damages. However, it reinstated one month's salary for each of the 49ers.

Regarding breach of contract, the overall picture leading to dismissal and events immediately after were analysed by the courts, not just the dismissal letter. Regarding the Employment Ordinance, an important aspect was that the judge defined the scope of "union activities" and its protection for workers in Hong Kong. The Court concluded: "Accordingly, most (possibly all) union-sponsored action is potentially protected by s 21B(1)(b), but if the action is not carried out "at [an] appropriate time", it is excluded from the provision". There was no challenge by Cathay Pacific to the Court of Appeal's decision to uphold the original Judge's conclusion that the statements made by Cathay Executives were defamatory of the plaintiffs.

John Warham, referring to the effect the fight has had on pilots' families, said: "In terms of human life, three people are dead because of what Cathay Pacific did to us. That's on their conscience, I hope they can live with that."

==== Acquisition and downsizing of Dragonair ====
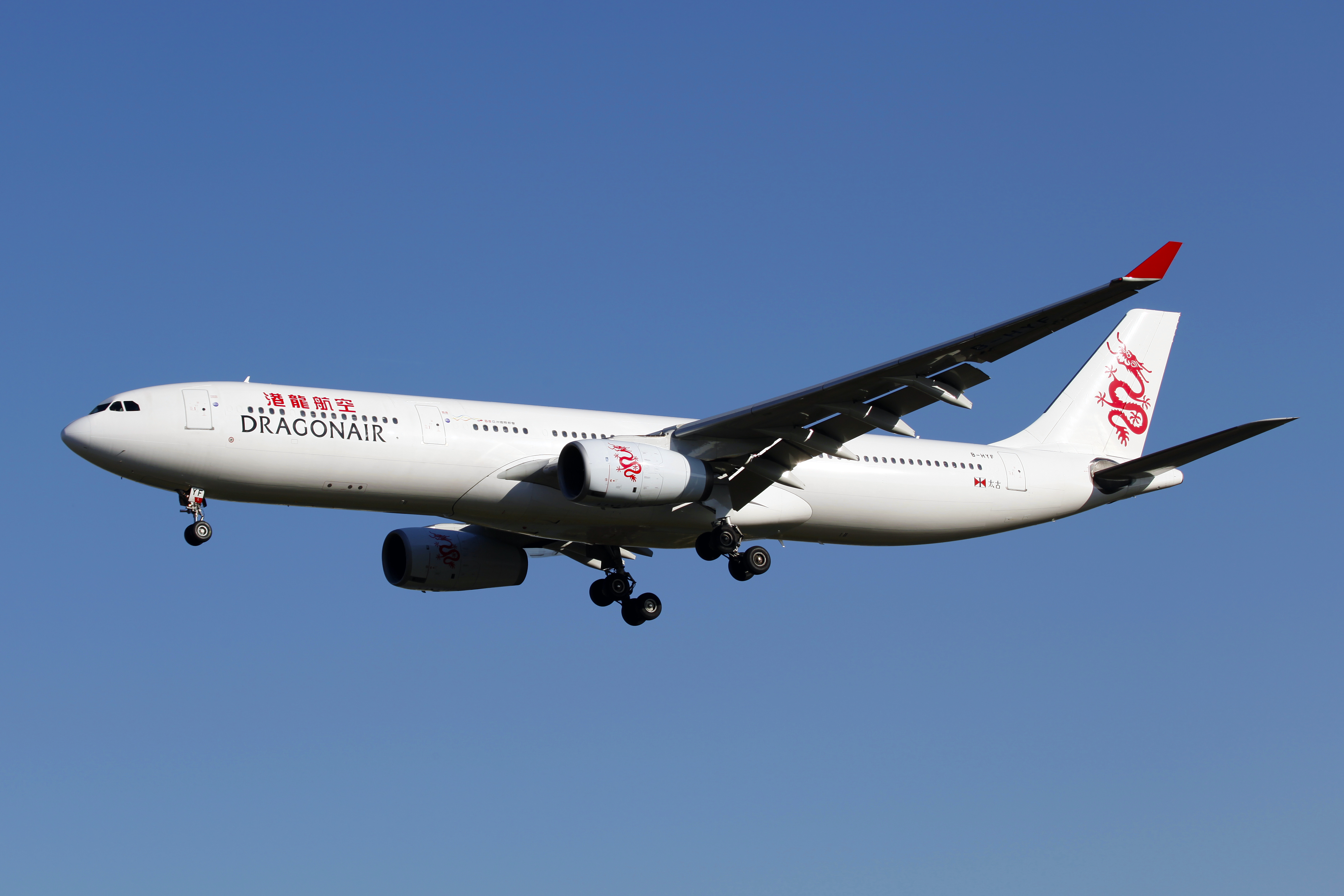
A Dragonair Airbus A330-300

On 28 September 2006, the airline underwent a shareholding realignment under which Dragonair became a wholly owned subsidiary but continued to operate under its brand. Acquiring Dragonair meant gaining more access to the restricted, yet rapidly growing, mainland China market and more opportunities for sharing of resources. CNAC, and its subsidiary, Air China, acquired a 17.5 percent stake in Cathay Pacific, and the airline doubled its shareholding in Air China to 17.5 percent. CITIC Pacific reduced its shareholding to 17.5 percent and Swire Group reduced its shareholding to 40 percent.

Dragonair had originally planned significant international expansion. It was already operating services to Bangkok and Tokyo, and was to have a dedicated cargo fleet of nine Boeing 747-400BCF aircraft by 2009 operating to New York, Los Angeles, Chicago, San Francisco and Columbus. It had also acquired three Airbus A330-300 aircraft to commence services to Sydney and Seoul.

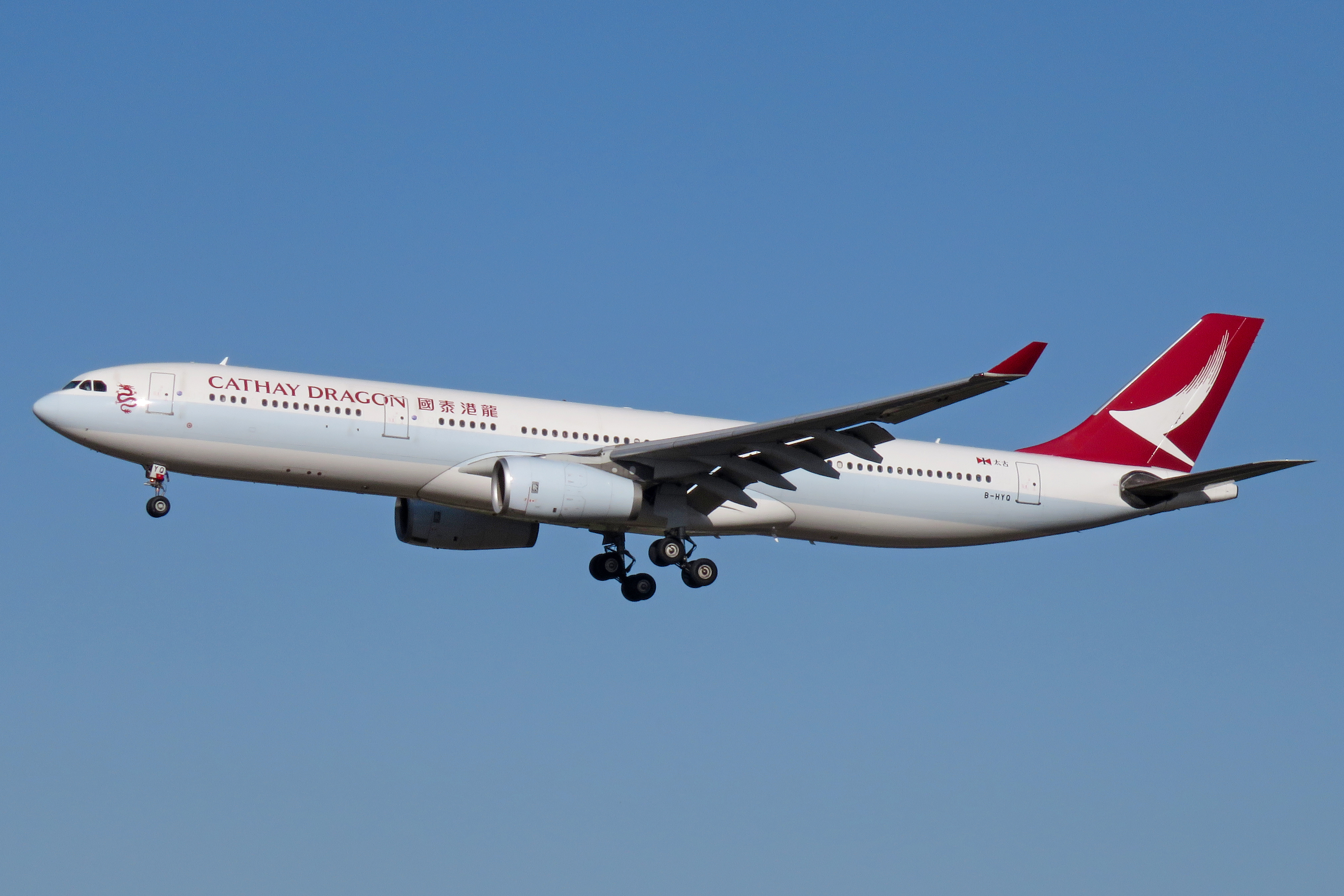
A Cathay Dragon Airbus A330-300

Following the acquisition by Cathay Pacific, Dragonair's proposed expansion plans underwent a comprehensive route compatibility analysis with the Cathay network to reduce duplication. Dragonair services to Bangkok and Tokyo were terminated, and new services launched to Sendai, Phuket, Manila, and Kathmandu. With the merging of similar departments at the two previously separate airlines, some Dragonair staff have had their employment contracts transferred to Cathay Pacific, except Dragonair Pilots and Cabin Crew and others made redundant due to the efficiencies gained in the merger. This resulted in an approximately 37 percent decrease in the amount of staff contractually employed by Dragonair.

In January 2016, Cathay Pacific announced it was rebranding Dragonair as Cathay Dragon.

On 21 October 2020, Cathay Pacific announced that it would shut down all operations of Cathay Dragon and merge it with its parent company due to the lack of customers and heavy economic problems brought by the COVID-19 pandemic. This merger marked the end for the subsidiary carrier after 35 years of operation. Cathay Pacific and its wholly owned subsidiary, HK Express, would take over Cathay Dragon's existing routes.

==== Economic challenges ====
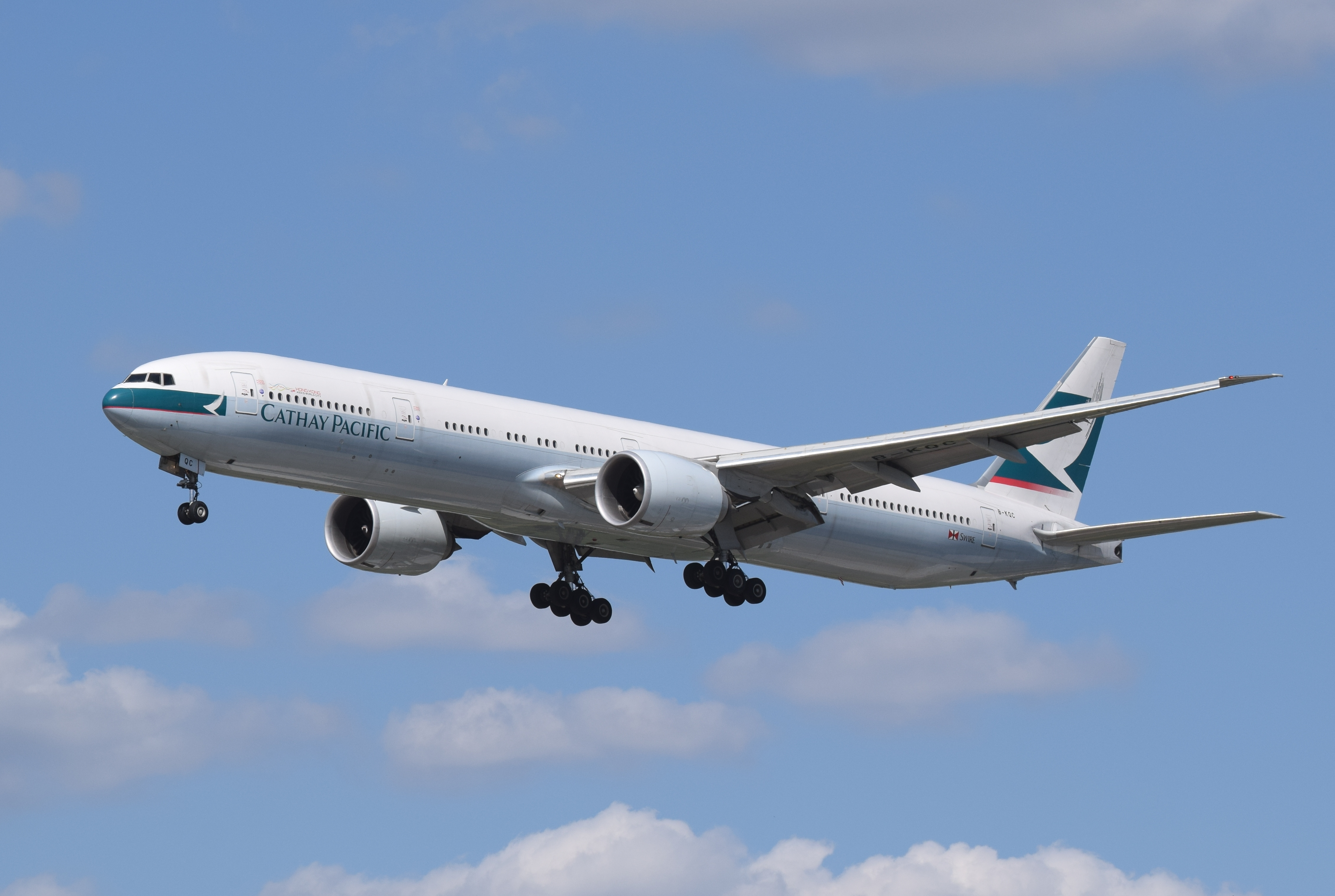
Cathay Pacific Boeing 777-300ER

To celebrate the airline's 60th anniversary in 2006, a year of roadshows named the "Cathay Pacific 60th Anniversary Skyshow" was held where the public could see the developments of the airline, play games, meet some of the airline staff, and view vintage uniforms. Cathay Pacific also introduced anniversary merchandise and in-flight meals served by restaurants in Hong Kong in collaboration with the celebrations.

In June 2008, Cathay Pacific entered into a plea bargain with the United States Department of Justice in respect of antitrust investigations over air cargo price-fixing agreements. It was fined US$60 million. The airline has subsequently set up an internal Competition Compliance Office, reporting to chief operating officer John Slosar, to ensure that the Group complies with all relevant competition and antitrust laws in the jurisdiction in which it operates. The breaches for which Cathay Pacific Cargo were being investigated in the US were not illegal under Hong Kong competition law.

In September 2008, three of Cathay Pacific's top ten global accounts, Lehmann Brothers, AIG and Merrill Lynch, hit financial trouble.

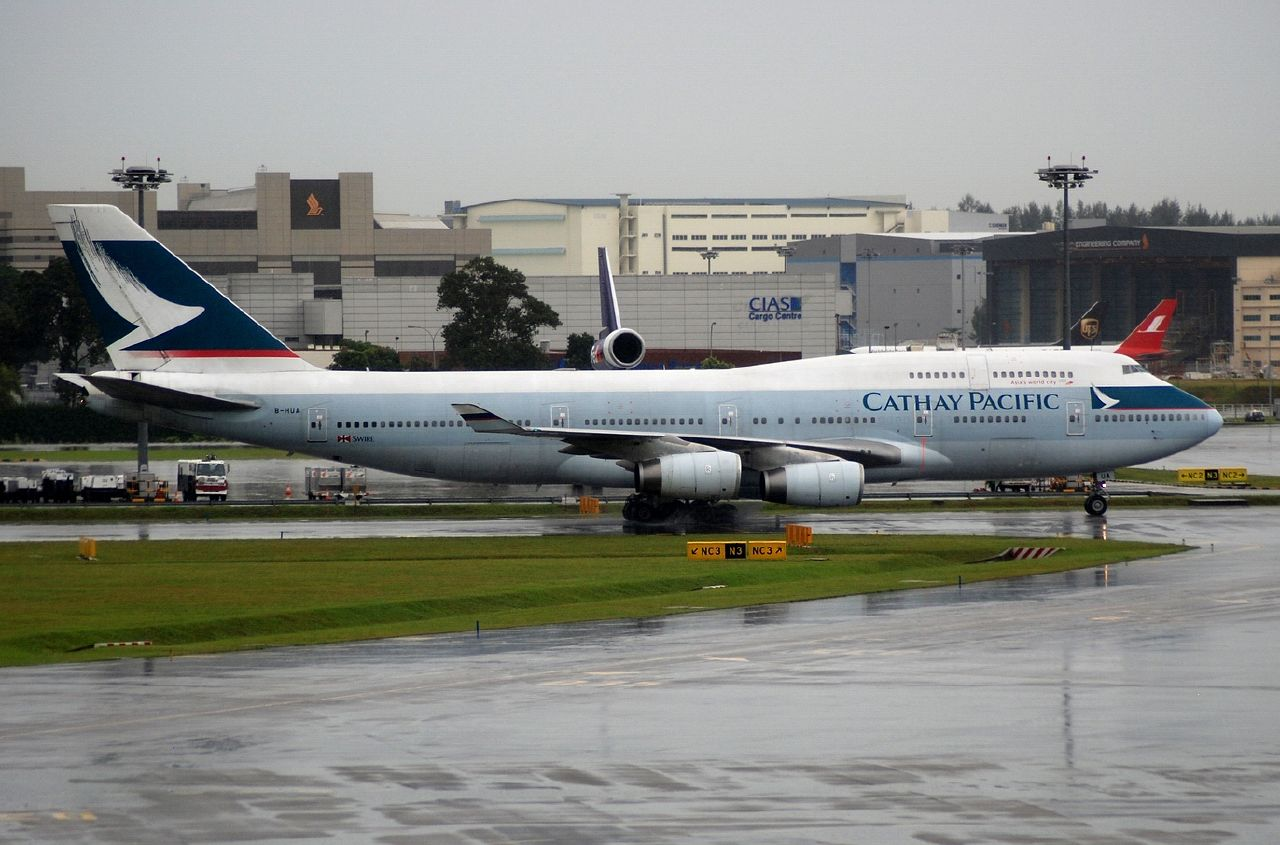
A Cathay Pacific Boeing 747–400 at Singapore Changi Airport

In March 2009, the airline reported a record full-year loss of HK$8.56 billion for 2008, which was also the carrier's first since the 1997 Asian financial crisis. The record loss included fuel-hedging losses of HK$7.6 billion and a HK$468 million charge for a price-fixing fine in the US It had to scrap its final dividend. The hedging losses were a result of locking in fuel prices at higher than the prevailing market price. As of the end of 2008, Cathay Pacific has hedged about half of its fuel needs until the end of 2011. The airline at the time estimated that it would face no further cash costs from the hedges if the average market price stood at US$75, enabling it to recoup provisions it made in 2008.

The flattening out of fuel prices resulted in Cathay Pacific recording a paper fuel hedging gain for its half-year reports for 2009. However, as a result of the global economic situation, the Group reported an operating loss. Given the current economic climate, and in line with the steps being taken by other major airlines around the world, the airline has undertaken a comprehensive review of all its routes and operations. This has resulted in frequencies being reduced to certain destinations, ad hoc cancellations on other routes, deferred capital expenditure, parked aircraft and introduced a Special Leave Scheme for staff to conserve money. According to CEO Tony Tyler, the yield from passengers was "hugely down" and the airline had lost "a lot of premium traffic". He noted that it could take 20 passengers in economy to make up for the lost revenue of one fewer first class passenger flying to New York from Hong Kong.

=== 2010–2020: Scandals and stagnancy ===
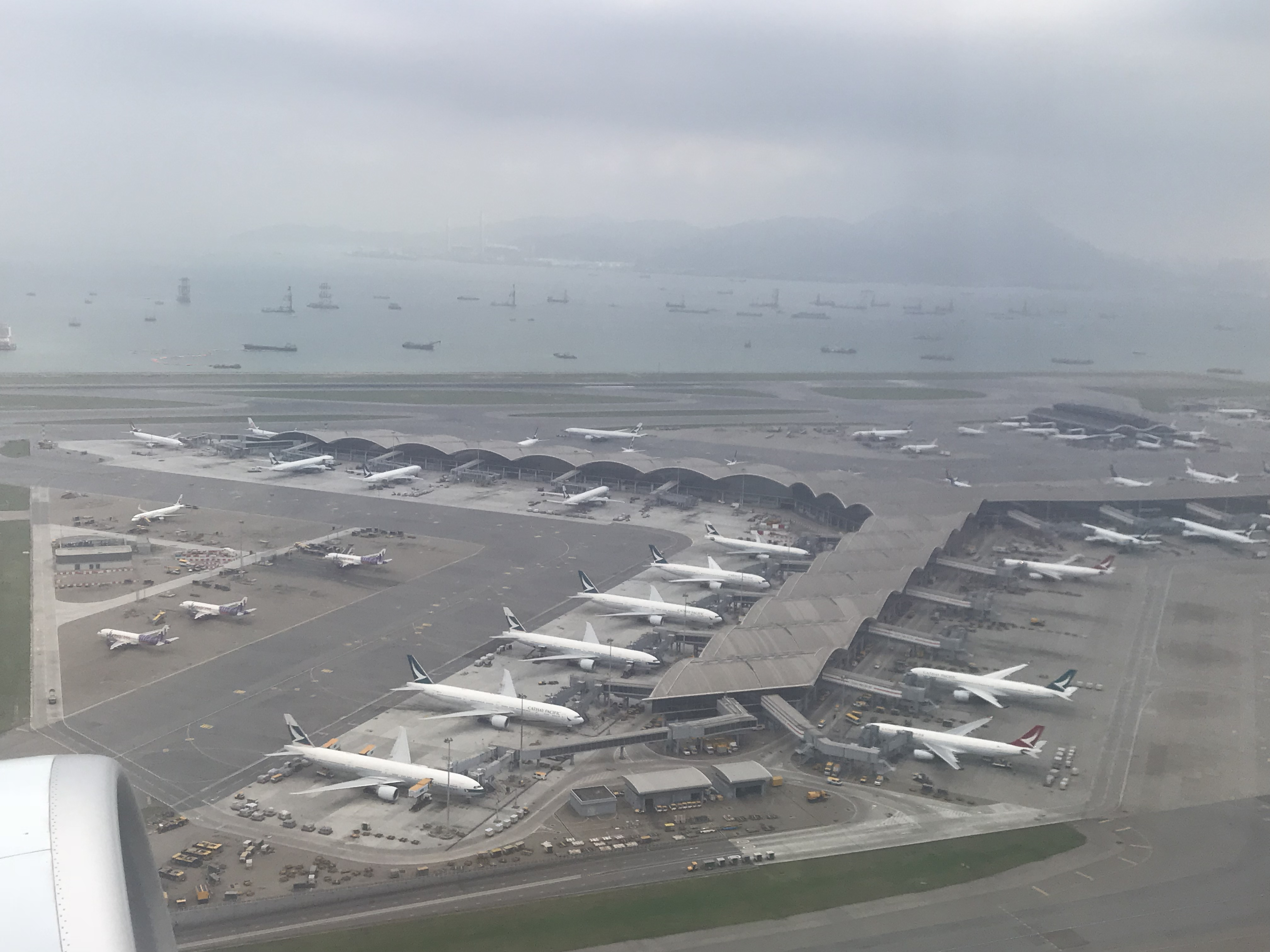
Cathay Pacific and Cathay Dragon aircraft at Hong Kong International Airport in 2018

In 2010, the airline set another record high profit, amounting to HK$14.05 billion despite record losses set in the same decade. At the same time, Cathay Pacific had taken delivery of several new aircraft types, including the Airbus A330-300 and Boeing 777-300ER. Tony Tyler left his position as CEO at the airline on 31 March 2010 to pursue his new job at the IATA. Chief operating officer John Slosar had succeeded as the new CEO. In addition, New Zealand's Commerce Commission had dropped charges against Cathay Pacific concerning the air cargo price-fixing agreements. In 2014, the airline underwent the largest network expansion in recent years which included the addition of links to Manchester, Zurich and Boston.

On 8 October 2016, Cathay Pacific retired their last passenger Boeing 747 (a 747–400 with reg B-HUJ) with a farewell scenic flight around Hong Kong after more than 35 years of service of the type. Cathay operated the 747 since August 1979, when it was inaugurated on services to Australia.

During the first half of 2016, Cathay Pacific's passenger yields fell 10 per cent, to the lowest in seven years as competing airlines from mainland China increased direct service to the U.S. and Europe, hurting the company's revenue from its Hong Kong hub. In October, Cathay Pacific scrapped its profit forecast for the second half of the year, less than two months after its issuance.

From 15 September 2016, Cathay Pacific decided to reintroduce fuel surcharge on many flights after its half-year net profits dropped more than 80% and it suffered HK$4.5 billion loss from wrong bets on fuel prices. As of September 2016, oil prices were halved from 2014 and stayed below US$50 a barrel.

==== 2017–2019 transformation ====
Under new leadership, the airline started to transform its business after suffering from 2 years of consecutive loss. The strategy focuses on 5Ps – Places, Planes, Product, People, and Productivity to find new sources of revenue, deliver more value to its customers and improve efficiency and productivity.

The airline restructured its organisation to be more agile and faster in decision making as well as responding to customers' needs. It has also launched 13 new routes since 2017, introduced a wide range of changes to its service, including bringing back hot meals on its most busy route between Hong Kong and Taipei, designed an inflight menu that features famous Hong Kong dishes served in all cabins, and revamped its Business Class service proposition to provide more choice, more personalisation, better presentation and improved quality in its food and beverages offerings.

The airline has also invested significantly in other hard product and digital offerings such as an upgraded website, new or refurbished lounges across its network, including the first airline lounge yoga studio at The Pier – Business in Hong Kong. Wi-Fi was introduced in 2017 and will be retrofitted across its fleet by 2020.

In February 2019, the airline issued a profit alert to the Hong Kong Stock Exchange indicating a profit of HK$2.3 billion for the 2018 financial year, signalling early signs of success of its transformation.

==== 2018 data breach ====
In 2018, the airline discovered a data breach. Data of around 9.4 million passengers were compromised during the breach, with 860,000 passport numbers, 245,000 Hong Kong identity card numbers, 403 expired credit card numbers, and 27 credit card numbers without CVV being accessed. However, no passwords were stolen. The breach was suspected in March 2018, but was confirmed only in May 2018. In March 2020, the company was fined £500,000 (U.S. $639,600) by the British Information Commissioner's Office (ICO) and avoided the heftier penalty of U.S. $564 million under the European Union's GDPR-derived data privacy laws, which were not in force during the discovery of the breach.

==== 2019: Acquisition of HK Express ====
On 27 March 2019, Cathay Pacific officially announced it would acquire HK Express, the only low-cost carrier in Hong Kong, citing to "expect synergies in generating a new business model and is a practical way to support long-term development and to enhance competitiveness". The transaction takes Cathay Pacific HK$4.93 billion total. The transaction was closed in July 2019, and HK Express became Cathay Pacific's wholly owned subsidiary.

==== 2019–2020: Hong Kong protests ====
During the 2019–20 Hong Kong protests, Cathay Pacific employees participated in protests at Hong Kong International Airport. The Beijing government, which is a shareholder in Cathay Pacific, ordered Cathay to suspend any employees who participated in the protest. Cathay chairman John Slosar responded, "We employ 27,000 staff in Hong Kong doing all sorts of different jobs... we certainly wouldn't dream of telling them what they have to think about something." Cathay Pacific later suspended a pilot who was arrested during a protest, and CEO Rupert Hogg declared his support of the government, and reiterated that employees who violated the company's code of conduct could be dismissed. On 16 August, Hogg resigned due to "intense criticism" from Chinese authorities as a result of Cathay staff participating in the protests. Chief customer and commercial officer Paul Loo also resigned. By late September, Cathay Pacific and Cathay Dragon had terminated the employment of 31 aviation professionals, or forced their resignations, on the basis of their participation in protests or expressions of support for them.

=== 2020–present: COVID-19 pandemic, recovery and ongoing developments ===
==== 2020: Recapitalisation and government bailout ====
On 9 June 2020, Cathay Pacific, Swire Pacific and Air China halted stock trading pending an announcement. On 10 June, Cathay Pacific and the Government of Hong Kong jointly announced a HK$39 billion recapitalisation plan and rescue package for Cathay Pacific. In the rescue package, the Government of Hong Kong will be issued HK$19.5 billion dividend-paying preference shares and HK$1.95 billion of warrants, giving it a 6% stake. The stake of the three major stakeholders, Swire Pacific, Air China, and Qatar Airways, would fall to 42%, 28% and 9.4% due to the government stake. Also, Cathay Pacific would receive a HK$7.8 billion bridging loan and the Government would have the right to appoint two observers on Cathay's board. The finance secretary of the HKSAR Government Paul Chan said, "It is not our intention to become a long-term shareholder of Cathay Pacific."

==== 2020–2022: COVID-19 pandemic ====
The COVID-19 pandemic led to travel bans and significantly reduced flight demands, which caused Cathay Pacific to cut international flights in response. In 2020, 96% of all flights from March to May were cancelled, while the group's subsidiary HKExpress suspended all flight operations from 23 March to 30 April 2020, due to reduced demand. At one point during the crisis, only 582 passengers flew with Cathay Pacific in an entire day.

In December 2020, the company said that it expected losses in the second half to be higher than the losses of the first half due to low demand, restructuring charges, and impairments on its fleet.

In 2021, the company posted a record annual loss of US$2.8 billion for 2020. It was also announced that the company would cut an additional 8,500 jobs.

On 22 April 2021, the company began its job cuts by closing its Canada pilot base, on the same day they began consultation with pilots at their Australia and New Zealand pilot bases regarding base closure in those jurisdictions. Pilots with the right to live and work in Hong Kong would be offered employment, however, those without the right to live and work in Hong Kong would face redundancy. On the same day, the company announced that they would review its bases in Europe and the United States later in the year.

On 12 May 2021, the company announced the closing of its Frankfurt pilot base. Around 50 pilots' jobs were at risk. As with the Canada base closing announced two and a half weeks earlier, pilots with the right to live and work in Hong Kong would be offered jobs, while those without the right to live and work in Hong Kong would face redundancy.

In June 2021, the company said that losses in 1H 2021 were expected to be lower than US$1.27 billion in 2020, due to cost-saving measures and strong demand for cargo flights.

In 2023 and in conjunction with the Airport Authority Hong Kong's "World of Winners" campaign, which aimed to promote tourism within Hong Kong, the airline provided some of the 500,000 tickets in the campaign, and released them in tranches for each region. Participants were required to register for its frequent flyer program and fill in a registration form on the date for the region the participant was in.

Cathay Pacific placed 76 aircraft in storage in Alice Springs, Australia. The last aircraft has returned to service in June 2024 after four years in storage.

==== 2023–2024: Mass flight cancellations ====
From December 2023 to January 2024, Cathay had to trim its schedules by an average of twelve flights per day through to the end of February to avoid significant flight cancellations over the peak Lunar New Year period. The pre-emptive decision comes as the airline grapples with a significant pilot shortage.

The cancellations were mainly on routes with multiple daily services, allowing Cathay to transfer booked passengers onto same day services. The carrier is also under some scrutiny in Hong Kong after a spate of flight cancellations since 24 December 2023, including forty flights over four days. Cancellations peaked on 7 January when the airline axed 27 flights at short notice.

After slashing its workforce during the COVID-19 pandemic, local news outlets say Cathay Pacific is now experiencing significant difficulties recruiting pilots, especially senior pilots. According to The Straits Times, around 1,000 of the airline's 4,000 pilots were made redundant during the pandemic, while a further 1,000 resigned, effectively reducing Cathay's pilot pool by 50% over the period.

On 12 December 2024, it was reported that Cathay have met their target of hiring 3,400 pilots to bring the airline back to pre-pandemic capacity. The airline is also planning to add another 100 pilots in January 2025. Prior to the pandemic, Cathay had a base of 3,800 pilots.

Cathay Pacific announced on the 8 June 2023 its return to Christchurch. With its first post-pandemic seasonal service starting on December 16, 2023, running through February 2024, and has since become a regular summer fixture, with services starting even earlier, such as November 3, 2025, for the upcoming season, offering more capacity and better connectivity to Asia.

==== 2024–present ====
In 2024, Cathay Pacific introduced its sonic identity, titled "Song of Cathay", created in collaboration with the agency Sixième Son. Designed as a musical expression of the brand’s travel experience, it is deployed across multiple touchpoints including lounges, aircraft cabins and digital platforms.

In 2025, Cathay Pacific announced that the airline will be returning to Rome, Brussels and Hyderabad - destinations that they used to serve pre-pandemic, along with new addition of Munich and Dallas - marking the carrier's 12th destination in Europe and 8th destination in North America. Cathay Pacific also announced a new route to Urumqi, China, its longest route into mainland China. With the addition of these new routes, the Cathay Pacific Group, along with its subsidiary, now serves more than 100 destinations worldwide, surpassing pre-pandemic figures.

In autumn 2025, Cathay Pacific announced the resumption of services to Adelaide starting on 11 November 2025, after being originally suspended due to COVID-19. This service will operate three times weekly as part of the winter seasonal schedule.

== Corporate affairs, identity and senior leadership ==
=== Business trends ===
The key trends for Cathay Pacific are (as of the financial year ending 31 December):

	2014	2015	2016	2017	2018	2019	2020	2021	2022	2023	2024	2025
Revenue (Note: Segment Revenue (Cathay Pacific(and Cathay Dragon))) (HK$ b)	104.9	101.2	91.5	95.9	106.5	101.4	42.7	42.2	46.4	85.3	94.7	107
Net profit (Note: Cathay Pacific, "loss attributable to the shareholders of Cathay Pacific") (HK$ b)	3.1	6.0	−0.6	−1.3	2.3	1.7	−17.4	−1.7	1.4	11.3	9.8	10.8
Number of employees (Note: "Staff number at year end" / "total workforce")	25,755	26,824	26,674	26,029	26,623	27,342	19,452	16,721	16,462	18,211	22,949	25,381
Number of passengers (Note: Cathay Pacific, "Revenue passengers carried") (m)	31.5	34.0	34.3	34.8	35.4	35.2	4.6	0.71	2.8	17.9	22.8	28.9
Passenger load factor (%)	83.3	85.7	84.5	84.4	84.1	82.3	58.0	31.1	73.6	85.7	83.2	85.2
Cargo carried (000 tonnes)	1,723	1,798	1,854	2,056	2,152	2,022	1,332	1,333	1,154	1,381	1,532	1,677
Fleet size	147	146	146	149	154	155	199	193	181	181	180	179
References												

=== Head office ===
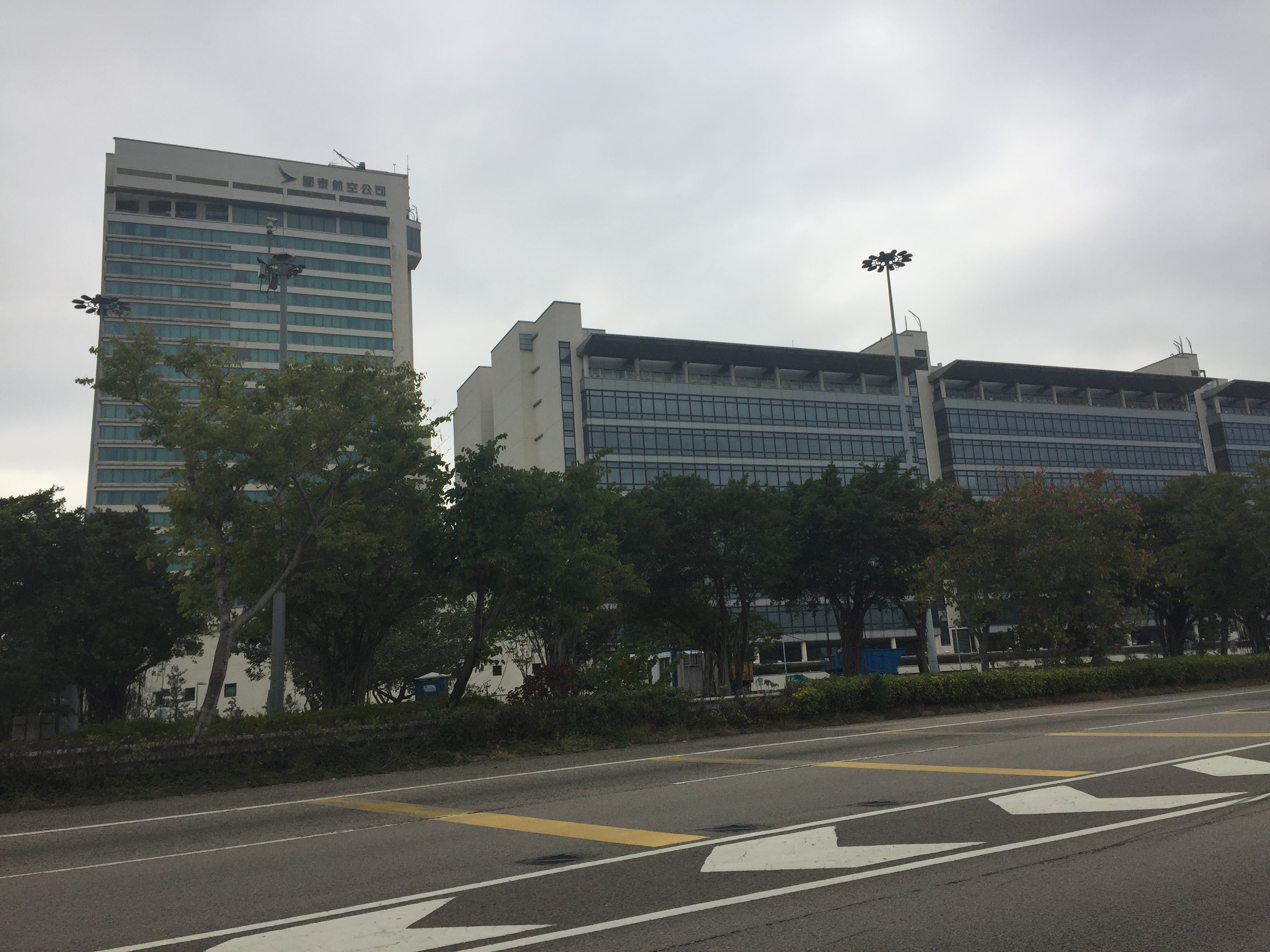
Cathay City, the airline's head office, located at Hong Kong International Airport

Cathay Pacific's head office, Cathay City, is located at Hong Kong International Airport. Cathay City was scheduled to be built in increments between April and September 1998. The headquarters opened in 1998. Previously the airline's headquarters were at the Swire House, which was a complex in Central named after the airline's parent company.

=== Major shareholders ===
- Swire Pacific 45.12%
- Air China 29.98%
- Public & Institutions 24.90%

=== Subsidiaries and associates ===
Cathay Pacific has diversified into related industries and sectors, including ground handling, aviation engineering, and inflight catering.

Companies with Cathay Pacific Group stake include:

Company	Type	Principal activities	Incorporated in	Group's equity shareholding
Air China	Corporate	Airline	Mainland China	15.09%
Air China Cargo	Joint Venture	Cargo airline	Mainland China	21.01%
AHK Air Hong Kong Limited	Subsidiary	Cargo airline	Hong Kong	100%
Airline Property Limited	Subsidiary	Property investment	Hong Kong	100%
Airline Store Property Limited	Subsidiary	Property investment	Hong Kong	100%
Asia Training Property Limited	Subsidiary	Property investment	Hong Kong	100%
Asia Miles Limited	Subsidiary	Travel rewards	Hong Kong	100%
Cathay Cargo Terminal	Subsidiary	Airline cargo handling	Hong Kong	100%
Cathay Holidays Limited	Subsidiary	Tour operator	Hong Kong	100%
Cathay Pacific Aero Limited	Subsidiary	Financial services	Hong Kong	100%
Cathay Pacific Aircraft Lease Finance Limited	Subsidiary	Aircraft leasing	Hong Kong	100%
Cathay Pacific Aircraft Services Limited	Subsidiary	Aircraft acquisition	Isle of Man	100%
Cathay Dining	Subsidiary	Airline catering	Hong Kong	100%
Cathay Pacific MTN Financing Limited	Subsidiary	Financial services	Cayman Islands	100%
Cebu Pacific Catering Services Inc.	Joint Venture	Airline catering	Philippines	40%
Deli Fresh Limited	Subsidiary	Catering	Hong Kong	100%
Ground Support Engineering Limited	Joint venture	Airport ground engineering support and equipment maintenance	Hong Kong	50%
Global Logistics System HK Company Limited	-	Air cargo computing	Hong Kong	95%
Guangzhou Guo Tai Information Processing Company Limited	Subsidiary	Information processing	Mainland China	100%
HAECO ITM Ltd.	Joint Venture	Inventory technical management services	Hong Kong	30%
Hong Kong Airport Services Limited	Subsidiary	Ground handling	Hong Kong	100%
Hong Kong Aviation and Airport Services Limited	Subsidiary	Property investment	Hong Kong	100%
Hong Kong Express Airways	Subsidiary	Airline	Hong Kong	100%
LSG Lufthansa Service Hong Kong Limited	–	Airline catering	Hong Kong	32%
Shanghai International Airport Services Co., Limited	Joint venture	Ground handling	Mainland China	25%
Snowdon Limited	Subsidiary	Financial services	Hong Kong	100%
Troon Limited	Subsidiary	Financial services	Hong Kong	100%
Vogue Laundry Service Limited	Subsidiary	Laundry and dry cleaning	Hong Kong	100%

=== Livery ===
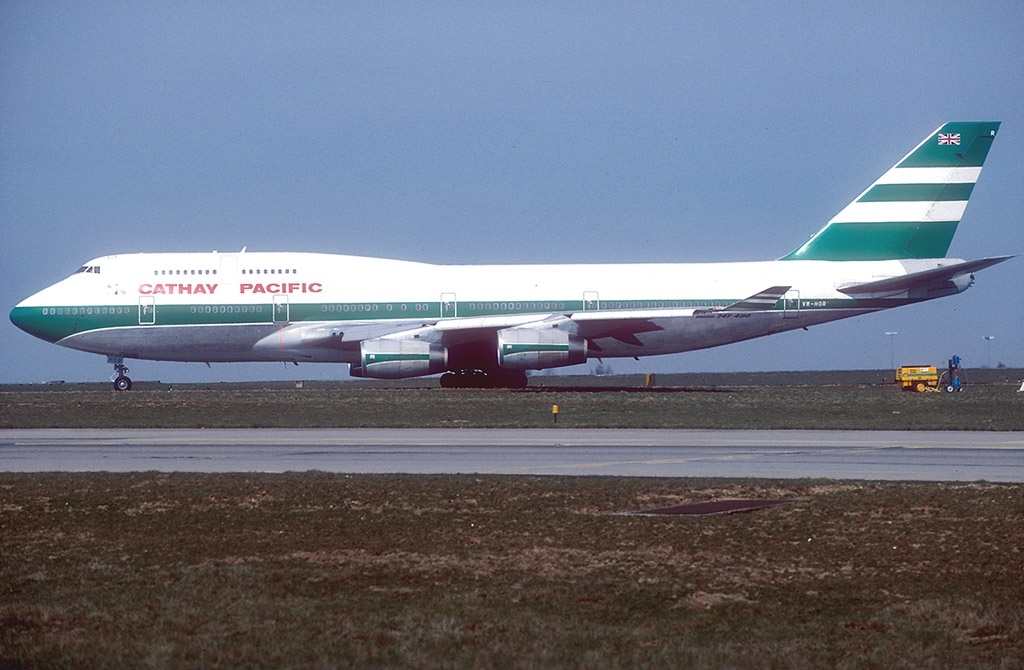
VR-HOR, a 747-400, seen at Charles de Gaulle Airport still wearing the Union Jack in 1993

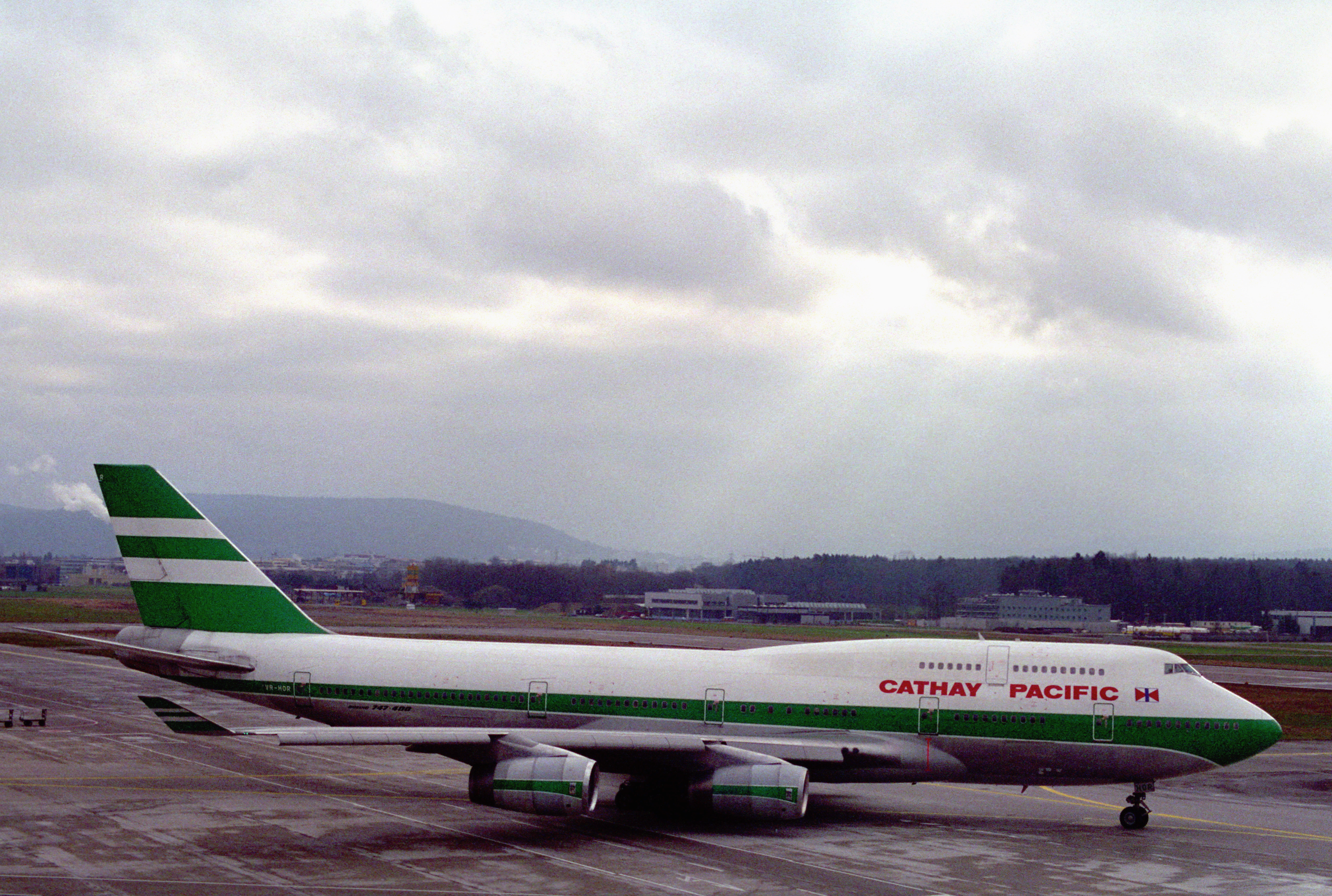
The same aircraft with the Union Jack eliminated, taxiing at Zurich Airport in 1995, two years before the Hong Kong handover

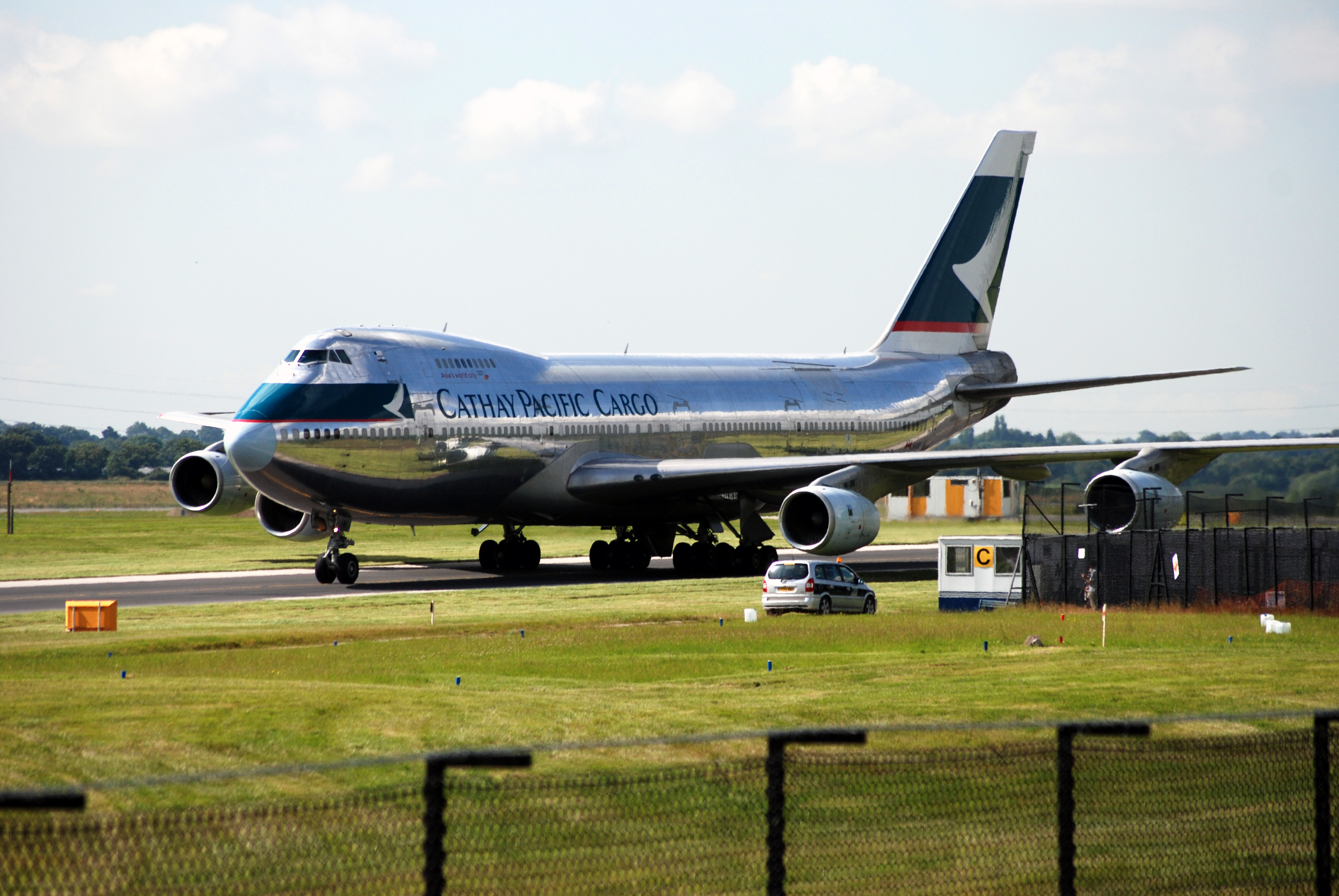
A Boeing 747-200F painted in the 1994–2015 livery at Manchester Aviation Viewing Park. Notice that the aircraft wore the bare-metal livery instead the original all-white livery with light green cheatline.

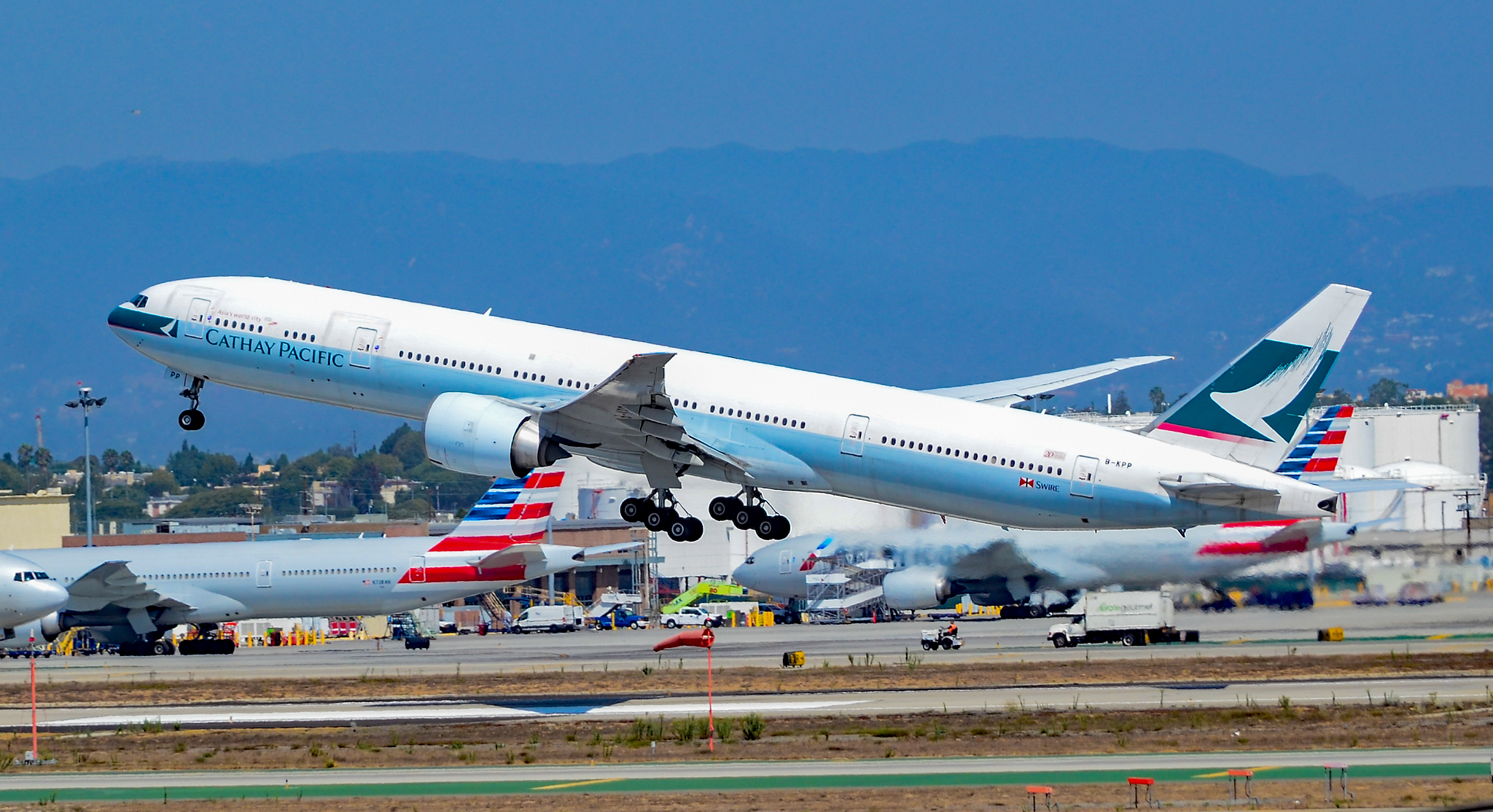
B-KPP, a Boeing 777-300ER, wearing the 1994–2015 livery at Los Angeles International Airport in 2017

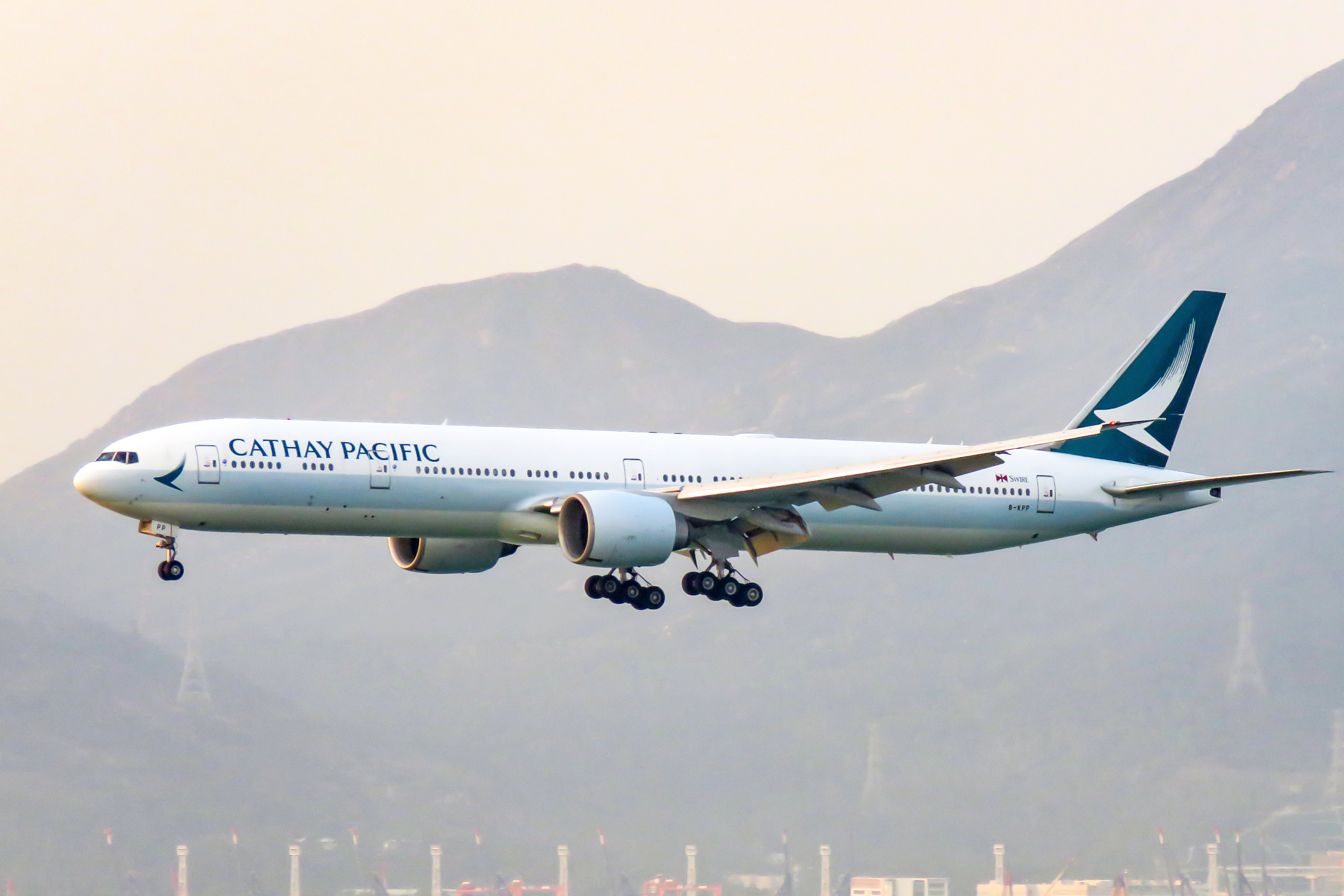
The aforementioned aircraft in the current 2015 livery landing at Hong Kong International Airport in 2019

From June 1971 until November 1994, Cathay Pacific aircraft used a "lettuce leaf sandwich" livery in Brunswick green and white over bare metal and carried the British flag on the empennage. After the handover, aircraft carry the Brand Hong Kong logo and with HONG KONG or in Chinese 香港 under or beside the Brand Hong Kong logo instead of using the Hong Kong Special Administrative Region (HKSAR) flag. The HKSAR flag has never appeared on any aircraft.

All Cathay Pacific aircraft carry the following livery, logos and trademarks: the "Brushwing" livery on the body and the vertical stabiliser, introduced in the early 1990s, and was first deployed on a Boeing 747–400 (VR-HOT, later re-registered as B-HOT), ahead of the launch of Airbus A340 service for Cathay Pacific. It also features the "Asia's world city" brandline, the Brand Hong Kong logotype and the dragon symbol; the Oneworld logo and the Swire Group logo. For most aircraft, the fuselage were all-white livery with a light green cheatline under cabin windows, but for some Cathay Pacific Cargo aircraft, especially Boeing 747-200F, they were bare-metal livery instead.

The brushwing logo consists of a calligraphic stroke against a green background; the stroke is intended to appear like the wing of a bird. The previous logo, consisting of green and white stripes, was in place from the early 1970s until 1994.

On 1 November 2015, the airline revealed a refreshed version of its previous livery, featuring a simpler paint scheme while maintaining its trademark brushwing on an all-green tail. It was first unveiled on a Boeing 777-300ER (B-KPM), in preparation for the delivery of the first Airbus A350 for Cathay Pacific. The aircraft was withdrawn from service in June 2020 amidst the COVID-19 pandemic and returned to its lessor in September 2021 at the expiration of its lease. The second aircraft was a freighter aircraft, Boeing 747-400ERF (B-LIA). Repainting was completed in November 2024.

On 18 June 2023, Cathay Pacific updated its freighter livery, which replaced the "Cathay Pacific Cargo" text with the larger "Cathay Cargo" text, as part of Cathay Pacific's rebranding. It was first unveiled on a Boeing 747-8F (B-LJN). An Airbus A330-300 (B-HLV) was the last remaining aircraft that had the classic "Brushwing" livery until it was repainted in November 2024.

=== Senior leadership ===
- Chairman: Guy Bradley (since May 2026)
- Chief executive: Ronald Lam (since January 2023)

Former chairmen include:

- E. McLaren (1948)
- E. G. Price (1948–1949)
- C. C. Roberts (1949–1950)
- E. G. Price (1950); second term
- C. C. Roberts (1950–1951); second term
- J.A. Blackwood (1951–1957)
- W. C. G. Knowles (1957–1964)
- H. J. C. Browne (1964–1973)
- Sir John Bremridge (1973–1980)
- Duncan Bluck (1981–1984)
- Michael Miles (1984–1988)
- David Gledhill (1988–1992)
- Peter Sutch (1992–1999)
- James Hughes-Hallett (1999–2004)
- David Turnbull (2005–2006)
- Christopher Pratt (2006–2014)
- John Slosar (2014–2019)
- Patrick Healy (2019–2026)

Chief executive officers were referred to as managing directors before 1 July 1998. Former CEOs include:

- Sydney de Kantzow (1946–1948)
- M. S. Cumming (1948–1950)
- W. C. G. Knowles (1950–1957)
- H. J. C. Browne (1957–1958)
- W. B. Rae-Smith (1958–1960)
- H. J. C. Browne (1960–1961); second term
- Sir John Bremridge (1961–1971)
- Duncan Bluck (1971–1978)
- Michael Miles (1979–1984)
- Peter Sutch (1984–1992)
- Sir Rod Eddington (1992–1996)
- David Turnbull (1996–2005)
- Philip Chen (2005–2007)
- Tony Tyler (2007–2011)
- John Slosar (2011–2014)
- Ivan Chu (2014–2017)
- Rupert Hogg (2017–2019)
- Augustus Tang (2019–2022)

== Destinations ==
Cathay Pacific serves 83 destinations (including cargo), but not including codeshare in 46 countries and territories on five continents, with a well-developed Asian network. The airline serves many gateway cities in North America and Europe, with easy connections with its Oneworld and codeshare partners, American Airlines and British Airways via Los Angeles and London, respectively. Also, the airline serves ten French cities via a codeshare partnership with French national rail operator, SNCF, from Paris.

On 5 December 2024, it was reported that Cathay Pacific will launch two direct flights to Munich, Germany and Brussels, Belgium in the summer of 2025. Subsequently, Cathay Pacific will be introducing a new route between Hong Kong and Dallas/Fort Worth, to commence in April 2025. The route will mark the airline's longest route (7,058 nautical miles) and will be operated four times weekly on its Airbus A350-1000.

=== Joint Venture ===
Cathay Pacific has joint venture agreements with the following airlines:

- Air China
- Air New Zealand
- Lufthansa Cargo
- Swiss WorldCargo

=== Codeshare agreements ===
Cathay Pacific codeshares with the following subsidiary airlines:

- Air Astana
- Air Canada
- Air New Zealand
- Air Niugini
- Alaska Airlines
- American Airlines
- Austrian Airlines
- Bangkok Airways
- British Airways
- Brussels Airlines
- Fiji Airways
- Finnair
- HK Express (subsidiary)
- Iberia
- Japan Airlines
- LATAM Chile
- Lufthansa
- Malaysia Airlines
- MIAT Mongolian Airlines
- Philippine Airlines
- Qantas
- Qatar Airways
- S7 Airlines
- Shenzhen Airlines
- SNCF (railway)
- Swiss International Air Lines
- Vietnam Airlines
- WestJet

Cathay Pacific also have codeshare agreements with two local ferry operators (Cotai Water Jet and Chu Kong Passenger Transport Co., Ltd) to connect passengers from Hong Kong to Macau, Zhuhai, Shenzhen and Guangzhou in the Greater Bay Area.

== Fleet ==
Cathay Pacific operates a fleet of Airbus narrow-body aircraft and a mix of Airbus and Boeing wide-body aircraft. Its cargo division, Cathay Cargo, also operates a fleet of Boeing 747 freighters. Their main fleet consists of Airbus A321neo, Airbus A330, Airbus A350 and Boeing 777 aircraft, while their cargo division operates two models of the Boeing 747: 747-400ERF and 747-8F. They also have the Airbus A350F, the Airbus A330neo, and the Boeing 777X on order, of which the A350F is for its cargo division.

== Services ==
=== Ground handling ===
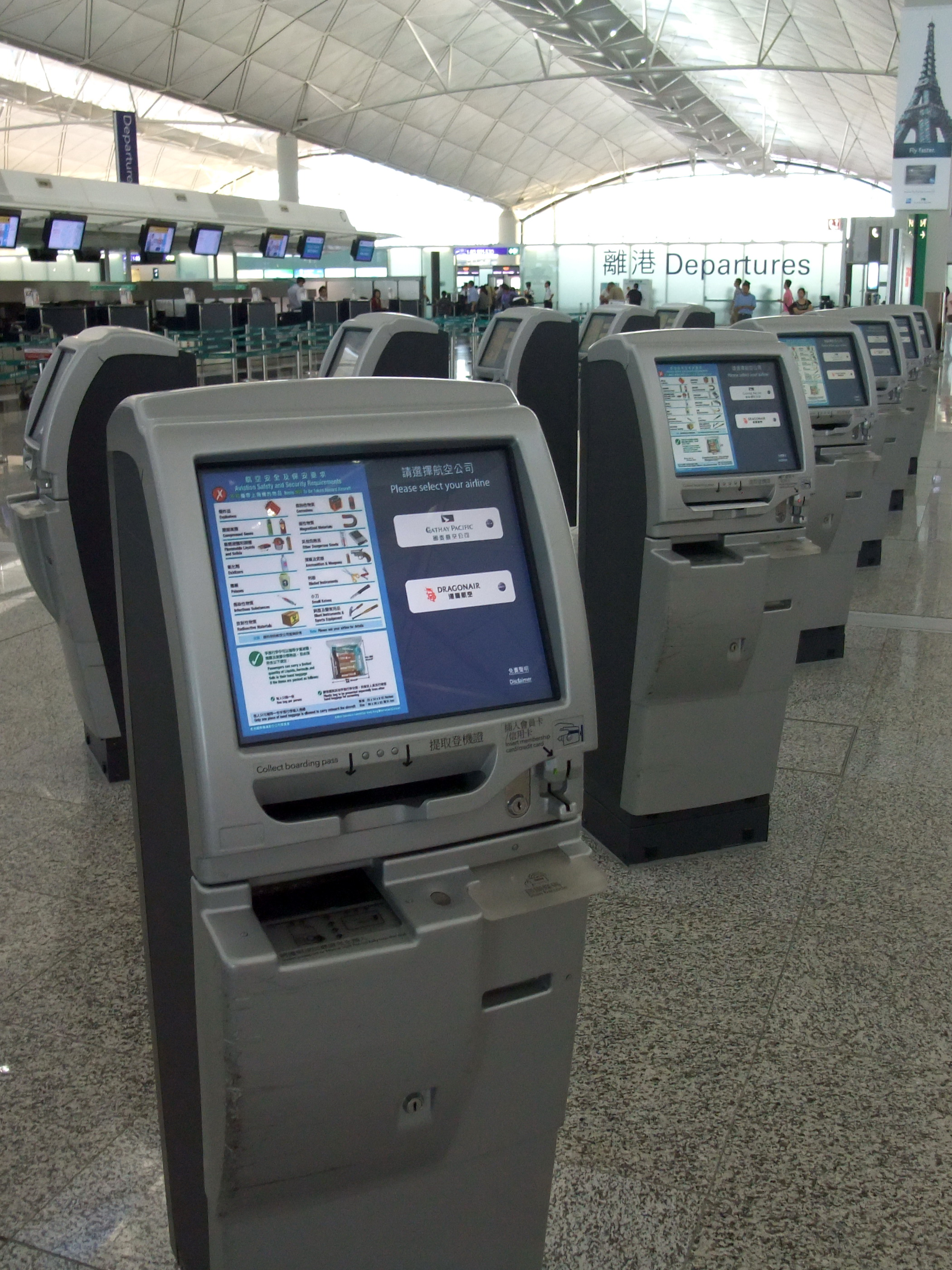
Self-check-in kiosks at Chek Lap Kok International Airport

Beginning in 2007, Cathay Pacific launched more methods to check in for flights. Among them were self-check-in using a kiosk at Hong Kong International Airport and other select destinations and checking in via a mobile phone. Cathay Pacific also launched a mobile application on App Store and Google Play, formerly named CX Mobile. Passengers can use the application to check flight arrivals and departures, check in for their flights and read about the destinations they are flying to using City Guides. The app has become a hit with passengers, making Cathay Pacific one of the industry leaders in offering mobile services to users of smartphones.

Cathay Pacific is also now following a trend among many airlines to improve its brand image to customers and shareholders with social media, and is ranked fourth worldwide. The airline now uses a range of social media tools including Facebook, Flickr, Twitter, Instagram, YouTube and blogging to share ideas with customers. In addition, it has launched a virtual tour to enable passengers to experience Cathay Pacific's new cabins and services without having to step aboard the aircraft.

On 4 January 2011, the cargo division of the airline, Cathay Pacific Cargo, became the first airline operating out of Hong Kong to fully switch to e-air waybill. This eliminates the need for all paper documents when issuing air waybills. The International Air Transport Association (IATA) selected nine countries and territories and airlines in which to run the e-AWB pilot program, including Hong Kong and Cathay Pacific.

=== Cabin ===
==== First Class ====
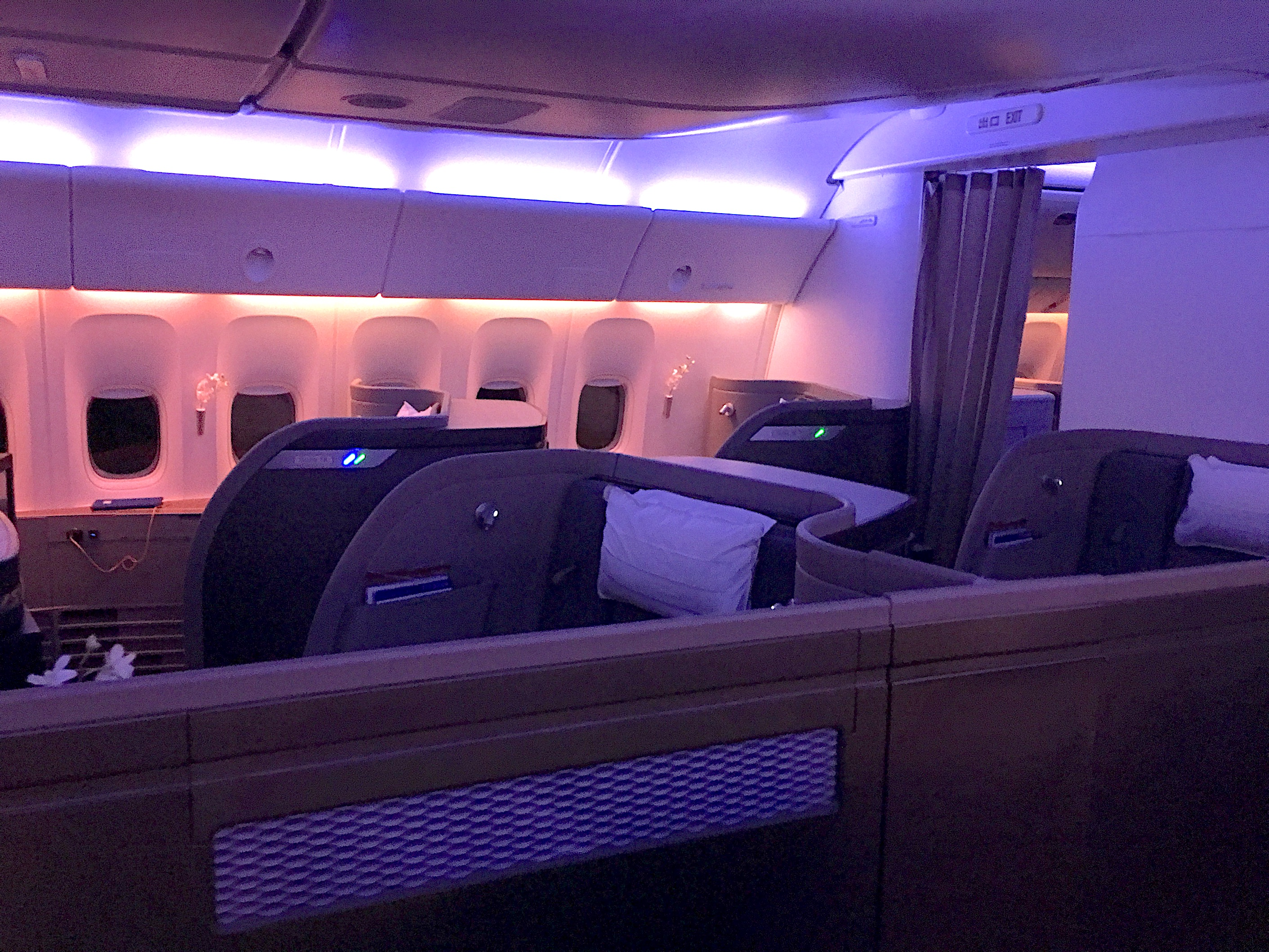
A First Class seat on board a Boeing 777-300ER

First Class is offered only on select Boeing 777-300ERs and features six seats in a 1-1-1 configuration. The first class seats can be converted into fully lie-flat beds measuring 36 in × 81 in (91 cm × 206 cm). The seats include a massage function, a personal closet, an ottoman for stowage or guest seating, and adjustable 18.5 in (47 cm), HD personal televisions (PTV). Meals often contain caviar, served with a mother-of-pearl spoon. First class passengers may use Oneworld or Cathay Pacific first class lounges at their departure airport.

==== Business Class ====
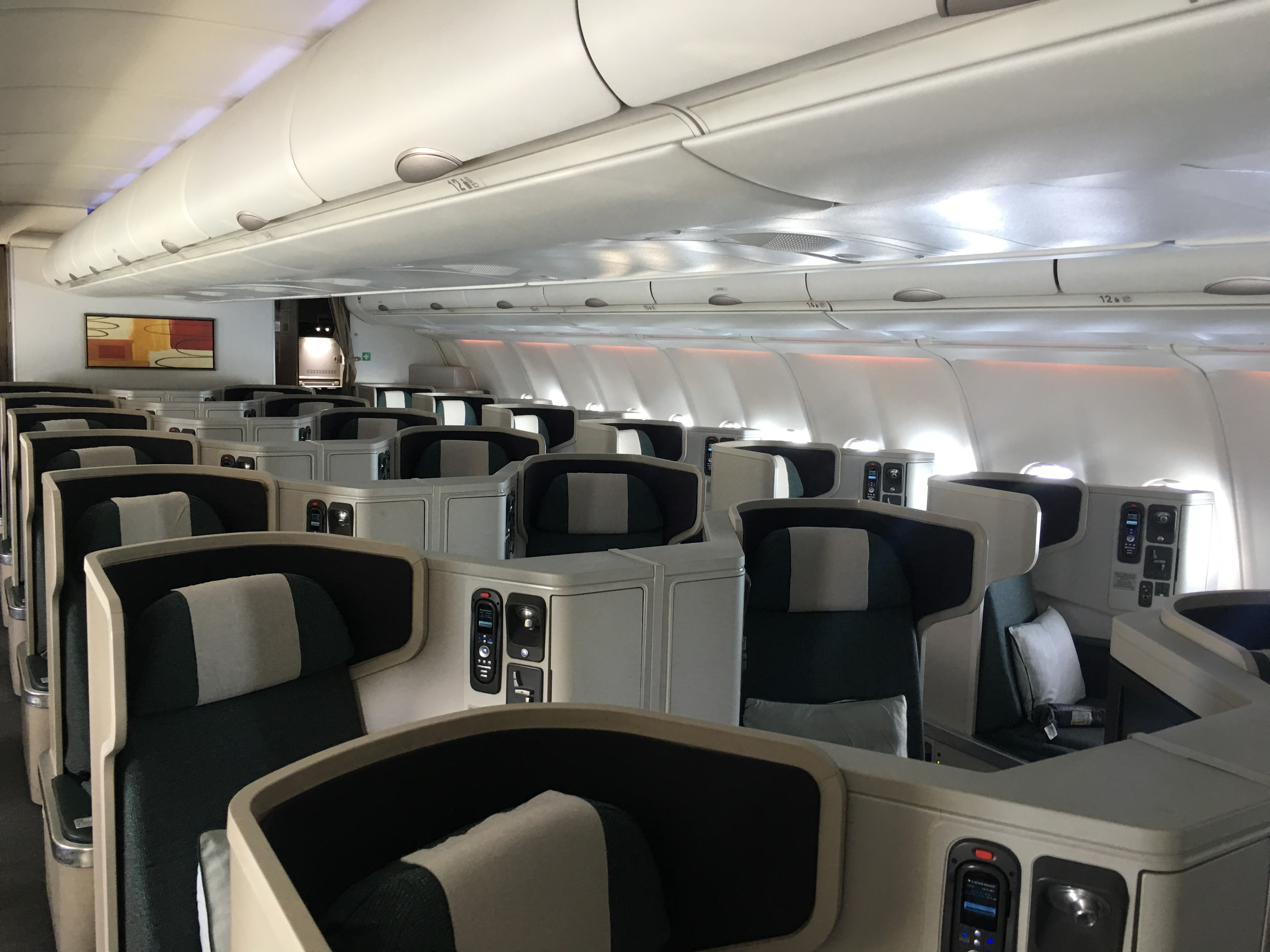
Business Class cabin on an Airbus A330-300

Business Class is offered on all aircraft, but can differ depending on aircraft type. Lie-flat seats are available on all Airbus A350s and Boeing 777-300ERs, as well as select Airbus A330-300s. Cathay Pacific introduced a new business class seat in 2011, featuring reverse herringbone seating in a 1-2-1 configuration. Each seat converts into a fully flat bed of length 82 inches (210 cm), with a width of up to 21 inches (53 cm). Each seat features a small, enclosed side cabinet, and an adjustable 18.5 in (47 cm) personal television. In 2016, upon delivery of brand new Airbus A350s, Cathay Pacific introduced a refreshed reverse herringbone seat designed by Porsche Design, with HD personal televisions and additional enclosed storage space on the side. In 2023, Cathay Pacific announced their "Aria Suite". Cathay Pacific has been installing the Aria Suite on their Boeing 777-300ERs since 2024.

==== Regional Business Class ====
Business Class is offered on all regionally configured aircraft. It is available on all Airbus A321neo and Boeing 777-300s as well as selected Airbus A330-300s. Seats have 21 in (53 cm) width and recline to 47 in (120 cm) of pitch and feature electrical recline and leg rest. A 12 in (30 cm) PTV is located in the seat back offers AVOD. In 2021, the airline has updated the cabin with a new seat on the Airbus A321neo, featuring a new design with hard-shell recliner seats that incorporate divider screens and a 15.6-inch PTV.

All Business Class passengers are allowed to use Oneworld or Cathay Pacific business class lounges prior to departure.

==== Premium Economy ====
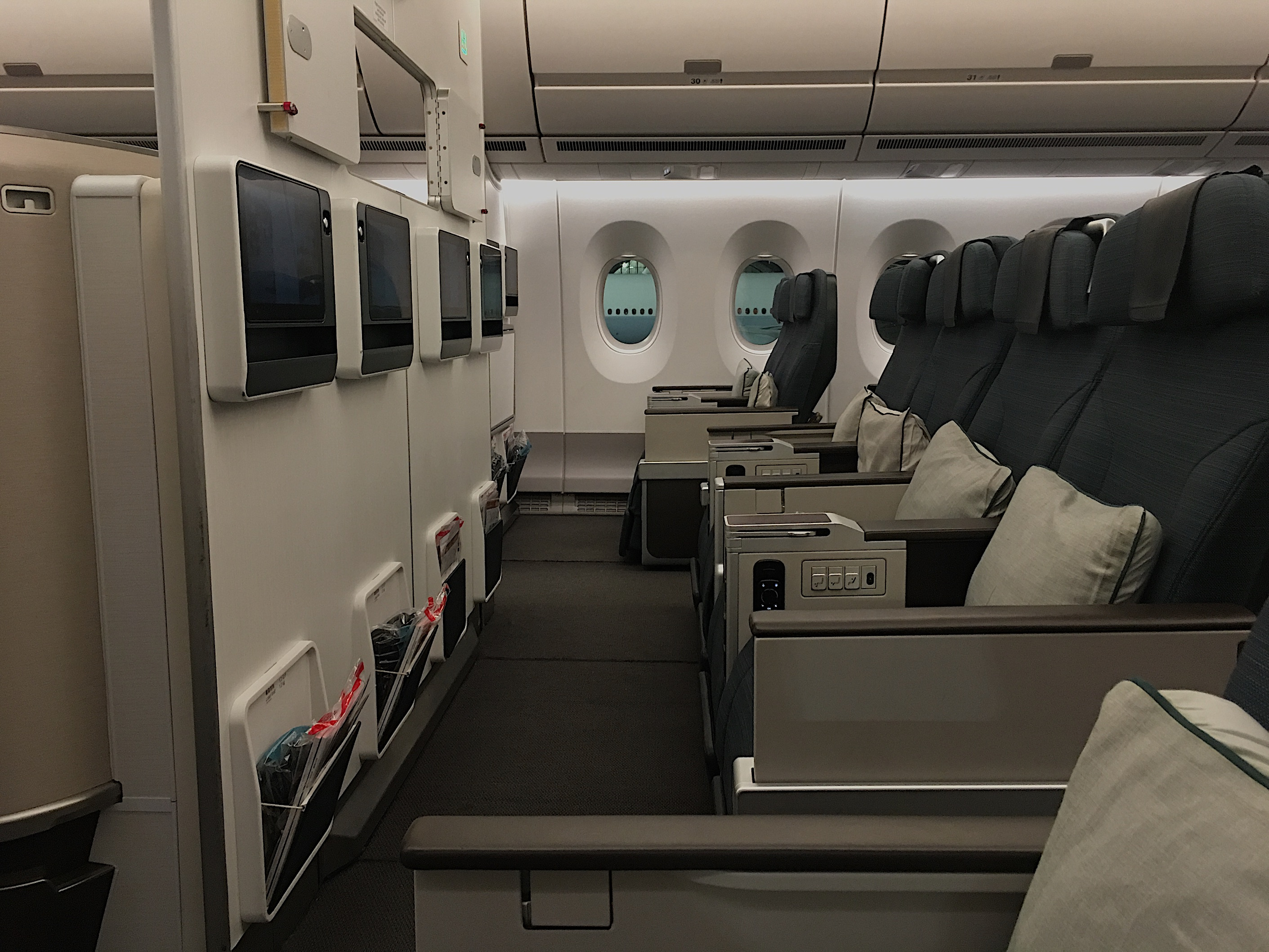
Premium Economy seats on Airbus A350-900 XWB

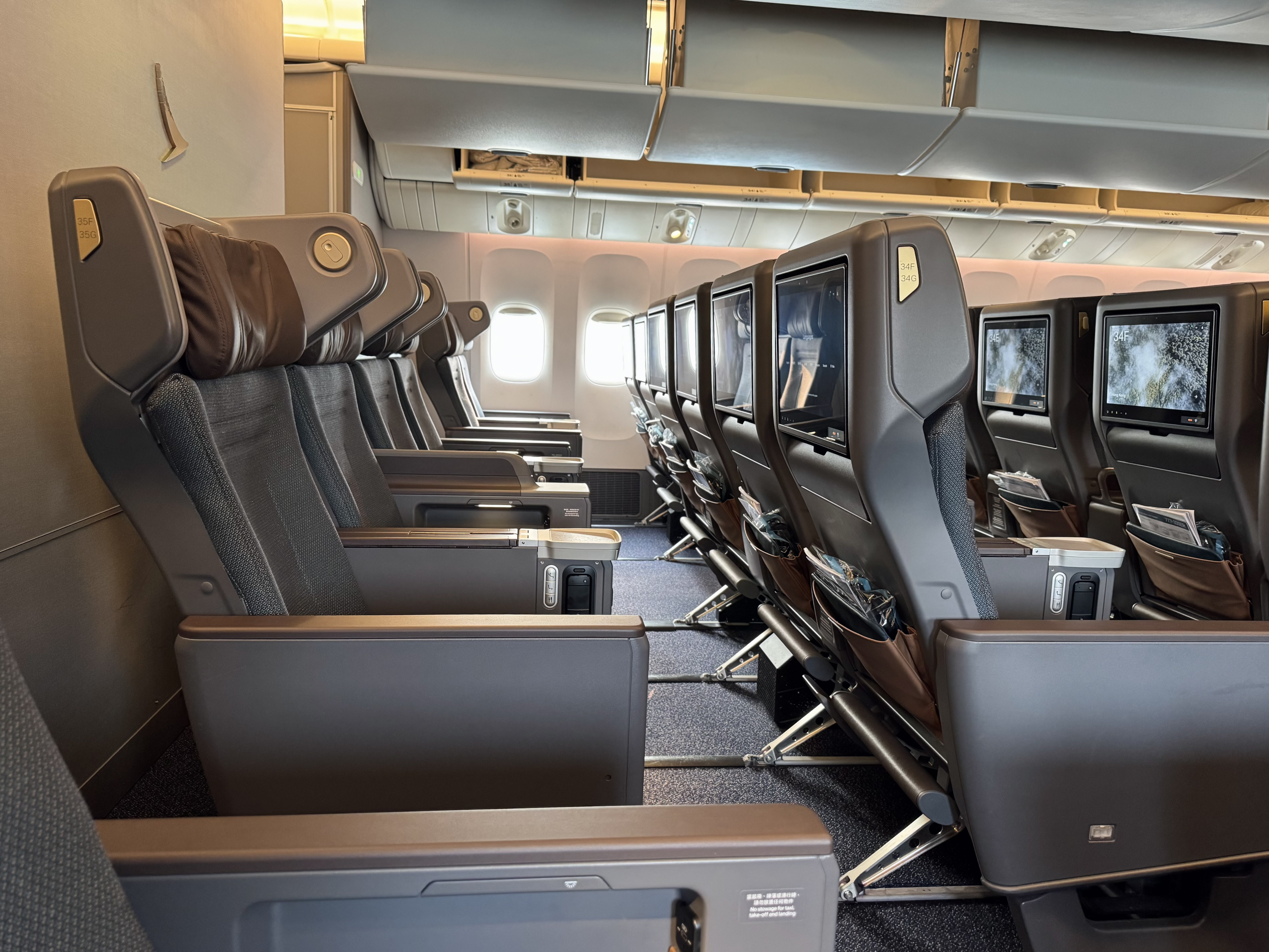
Premium Economy seats on Boeing 777-300ER

Premium Economy is offered on all Airbus A350s and Boeing 777-300ERs, as well as selected Airbus A330-300s. Cathay Pacific introduced a premium economy class in March 2012. The seat pitch is 38 inches – six inches more than Economy Class – and the seat itself is wider and have a bigger recline. It has a large meal table, cocktail table, footrest, a 10.6-inch personal television, an in-seat power outlet, a multi-port connector for personal devices, and extra personal storage space. The Premium Economy Class seat offers a higher level of comfort with more living space in a separate cabin before the Economy Class zone.

In 2016, on delivery of the Airbus A350-900 fleet, Cathay Pacific introduced a new Premium Economy seat, which features a 12.1 in (31 cm) HD PTV, and improved pitch of 40 inches (100 cm). The new seats are configured in a 2-4-2 configuration, with a width of 18.5 in (47 cm).

==== Economy Class ====
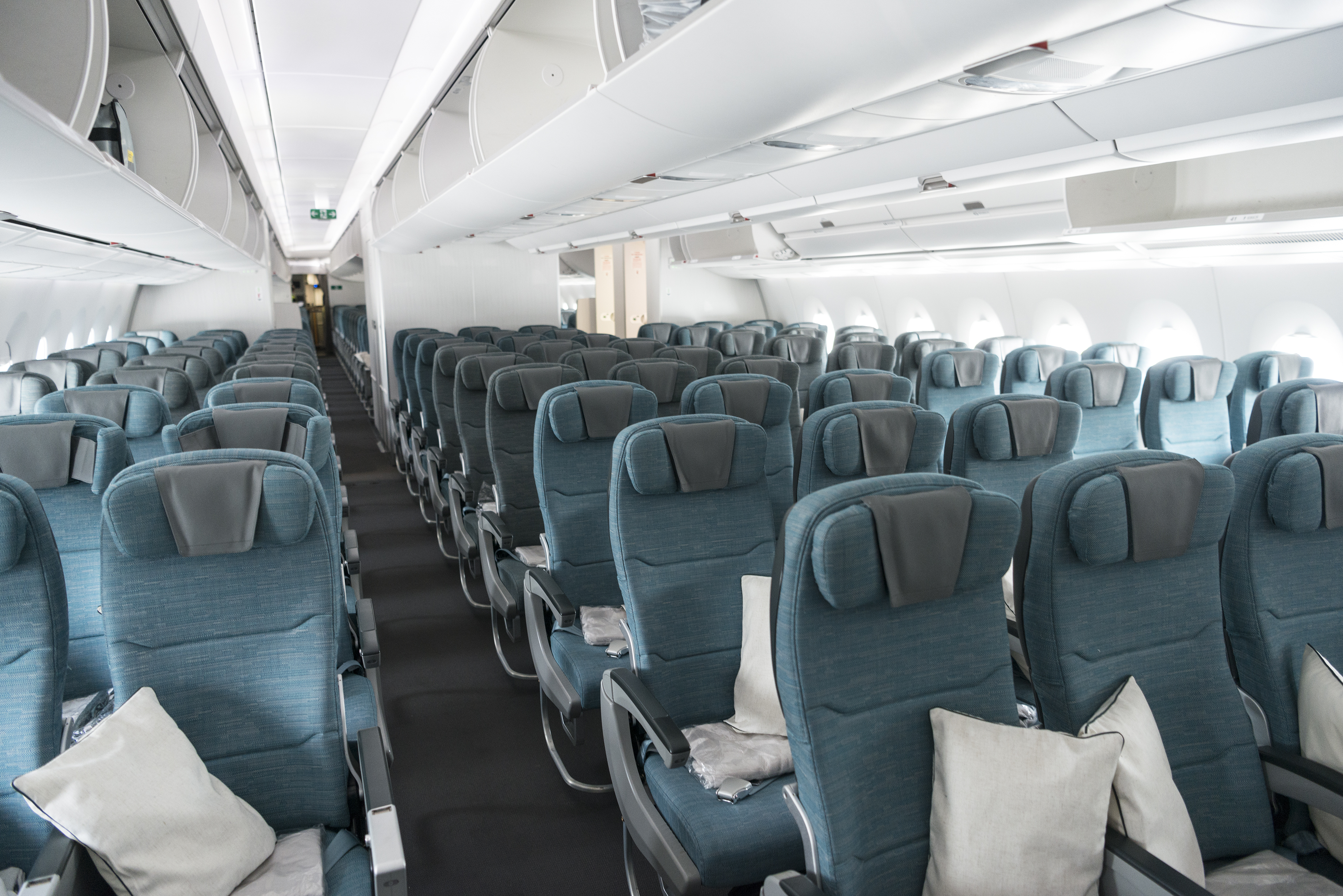
Economy Class cabin on an Airbus A350-900

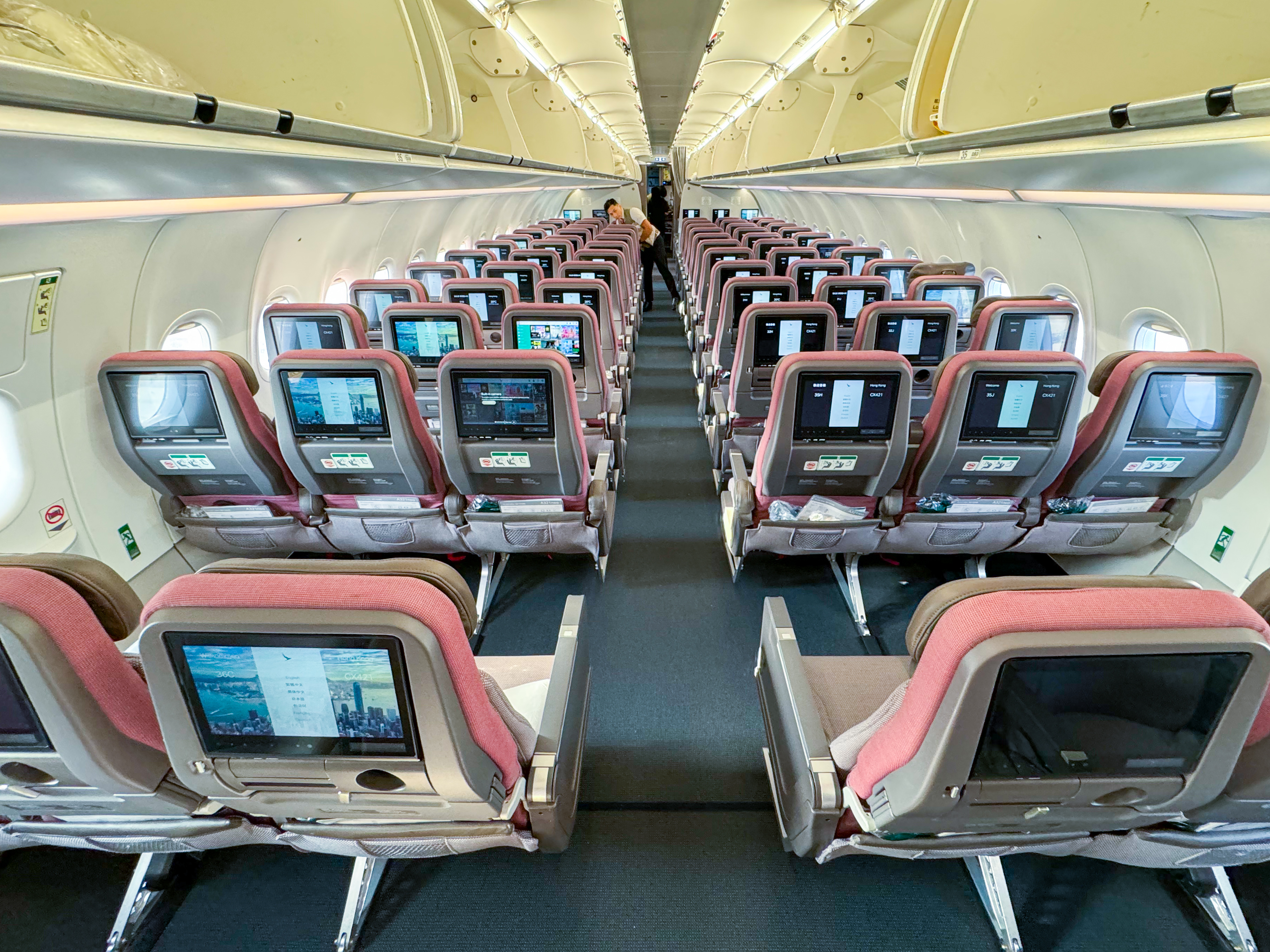
Economy class on an Airbus A321neo

Cathay Pacific currently has five types of Economy Class, different on each aircraft. From the oldest 2007 type to the newest 2021 type, each has its own unique features.

===== 2007 Economy Class (ex. 330, 340, 747, 777) =====
The phased-out old Economy Class seats, previously offered on aircraft outfitted with the refurbished long-haul interiors, were designed by B/E Aerospace and introduced in July 2008. These seats include a fixed back design (shell) that allows passengers to recline without intruding on those seated behind, a 9 in (23 cm) PTV providing AVOD, AC power located behind a larger tray table, a coat hook and a literature pocket that has been relocated to below the seat cushion to create more legroom. The fixed shell of these seats has been criticised. The previous Economy Class seats each feature 6 in (15 cm) PTVs with a choice of 25 channels. These seats are 17 in (43 cm) in width and have 32 in (81 cm) of pitch. These seats were replaced with an updated Economy Class seat on aircraft receiving the Cathay Pacific's updated long-haul interior configuration. This is no longer available as it is replaced by the new 2012 Economy Class.

===== 2012 Economy Class (333, ex. 777) =====
Cathay Pacific updated its economy class seats in March 2012, replacing the older fixed back design. They have a six-inch recline (two inches over the current long-haul economy seat). These seats are 17.5 in (44 cm) in width and have 32 in (81 cm) of pitch.

===== 2016 Economy Class (359) =====
Cathay Pacific released their new economy class on the A350-900, featuring dark green seats with a 11.1 inch touch screen, USB ports and a tablet tray. Also, seats have access to 110-volt AC power. With the new economy class design, new in-flight entertainment was also provided. The headrest size has been enlarged.

===== 2017 Economy Class (777) =====
Since 2017, all Boeing 777s were retrofitted with the popular long-haul economy product Recaro CL3710 seat. In addition, the fleet featured a change in configuration from 9 abreast to 10 abreast. This increased the economy class seats on board the −300 series from 356 to 396 seats & the −300ER from 182/268 seats to 201/296 seats. All new seats feature new 11.6-inch touch screens, USB ports, & improved seat pitch. The seat width is 17.2 in (44 cm).

===== 2018 Economy Class (35K) =====
The A350-1000 Economy Class utilises a highly customised version of the HAECO Vector Y+ seat. A separate drink holder and a bottle pouch are added. The screens are matted and feature a privacy layer, ensuring neighboring seats may not easily view each other's content for added privacy. The seat is double padded, making it thicker than any other Economy Class in the fleet (Other than the A321neo, which utilises the same seat). The faux leather headrest is also bigger.

===== 2021 Economy Class (321neo) =====
The 2021 Economy Class is identical to 2018 Economy Class, featuring the HAECO Vector Y+ design, except a few upgrades, such as a 4K resolution in-flight entertainment system, which had its privacy screen removed after user feedback regarding inaccessibility. In addition, a smaller LCD screen is added below the main screen for additional information such as flight time, and destination time. These aircraft were originally designated for Cathay Dragon, which had its brand dissolved prior to taking delivery of these A321neos, which is why Cathay's A321neo economy class features a distinct Cordova red colour scheme in contrast with the rest of the Cathay fleet, which all feature bottle green seating.

=== Catering ===
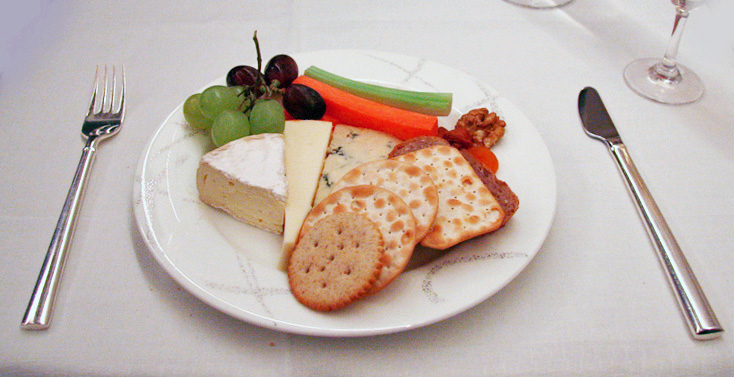
A fruit and cheese course served in First Class

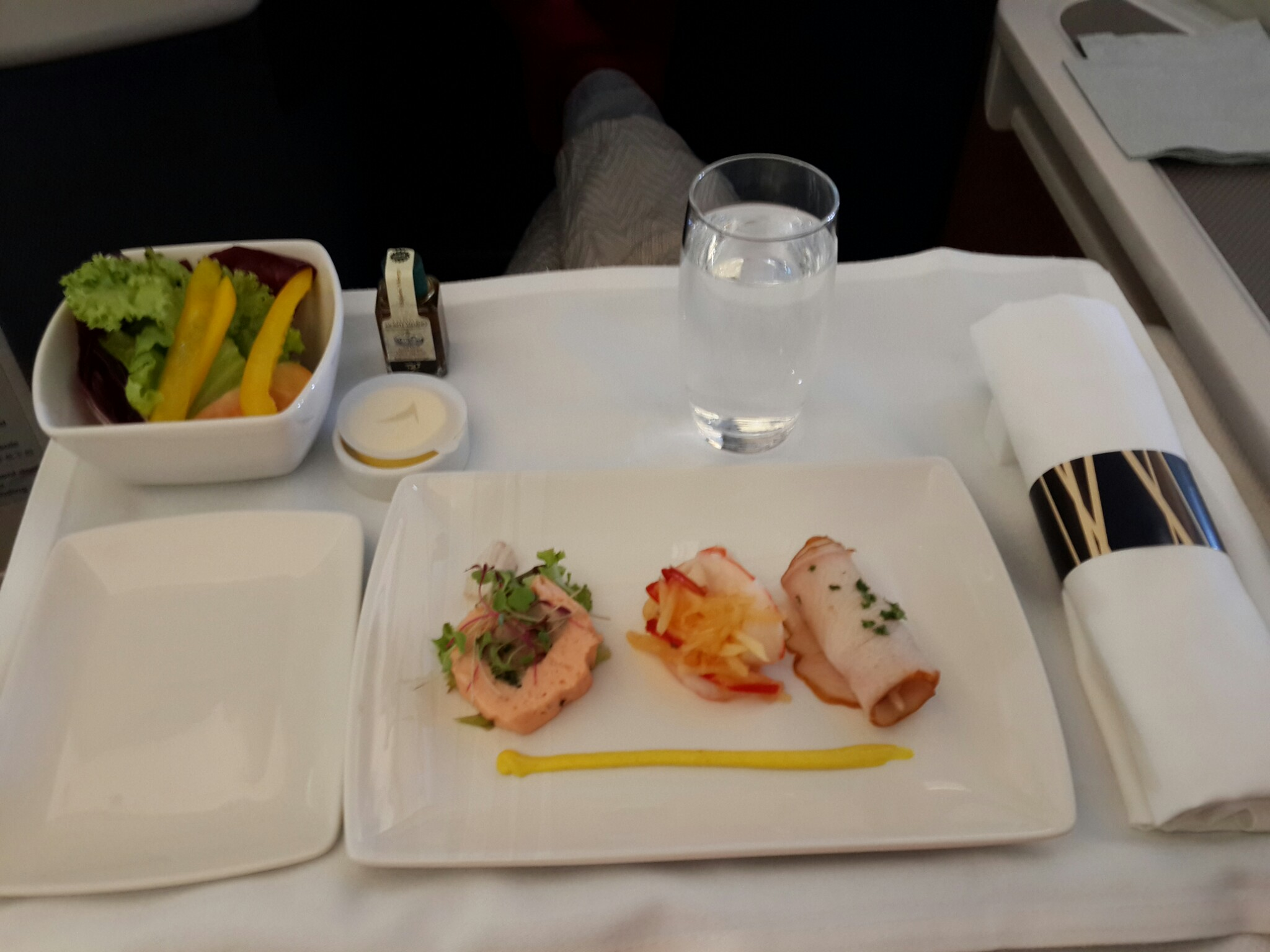
A starter served in Cathay Pacific's Business Class

Food and beverages are complimentary on all flights, with two hot meals generally served on each flight for long haul flights, along with free alcoholic beverages. Foods served on flights from Hong Kong are provided by Cathay Pacific Catering Services (CPCS) facilities in Hong Kong. CLS Catering Services Limited, a joint venture with LSG Sky Chefs, provides inflight catering from Toronto and Vancouver airports; while Vietnam Air Caterers, a joint venture between CPCS and Vietnam Airlines, provides the same for flights from Ho Chi Minh City. Meals on Manila–Hong Kong flights are typically served in snack bags as complimentary snacks and drinks.

The "Choose My Meal" service launched in July 2020 for Business Class passengers. This service was extended to First Class passengers when First Class service was resumed in November 2023. Passengers can choose their meals 10 days before departure, and features Cathay Signature dishes such as baked crab shell, braised abalone with pomelo pith, and wok fried seafood in lobster broth.

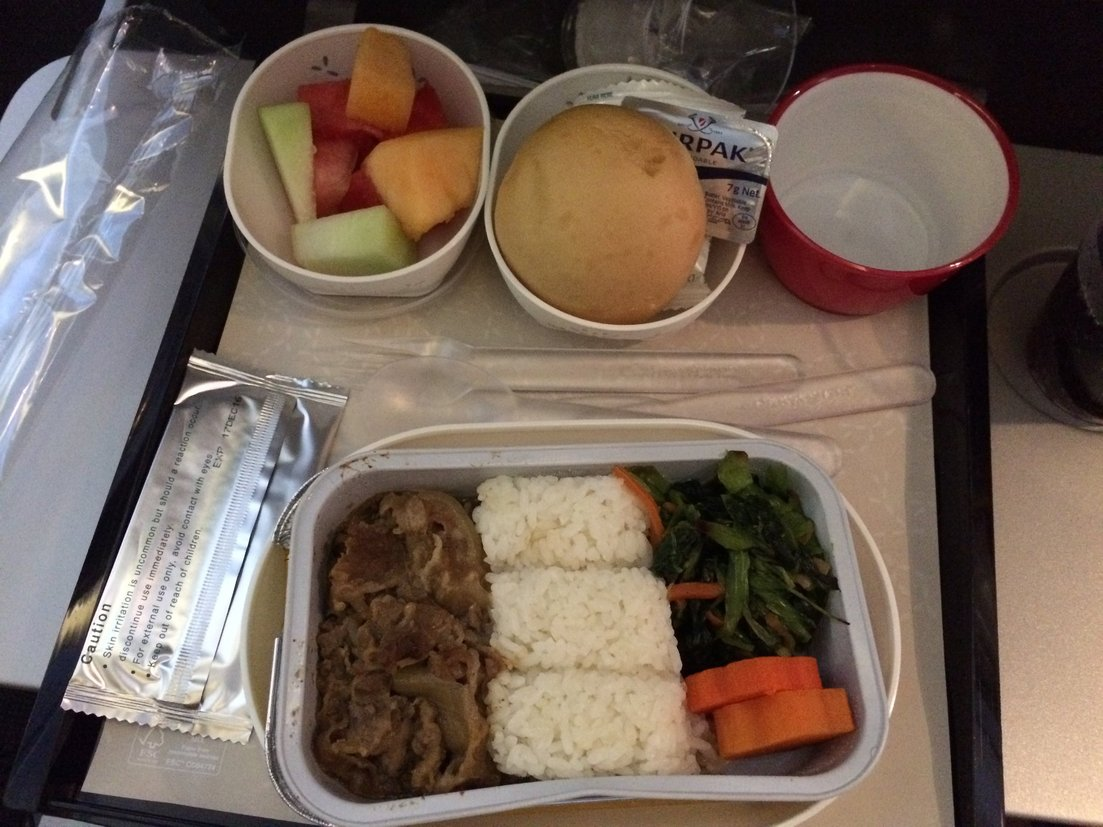
Beef and rice served onboard a Cathay Pacific Flight

=== In-flight entertainment ===
==== StudioCX (2012) ====
The first type is the StudioCX system that was launched in 2012. Now, it can only be found in unrefurbished A330s. The old system features movies, TV, music, inflight map and some games. The system is identical to Cathay Dragon's Entertainment (StudioKA).

==== StudioCX (2016) ====
In 2016, following the new A350-900, Cathay Pacific launched the new entertainment system. The new system features a brand new, modern and lighter design. There are lots of new content from the old system, following a new moving map (rather than the stuck map from the StudioCX system), live TV, reading materials, magazines, news, shopping, Sports24 (only on A350) and more movies. Resolution is 4K on A321s. In 2017, the introduction for StudioCX was updated.

StudioCX, Cathay Pacific's in-flight entertainment system, equipped with personal televisions in every seat, offers movies, Asian and Western TV programs, music and games. The airline also provides a range of different newspapers and magazines from around the world, including the airline's in-flight magazine Discovery (now Cathay). Passengers with visual impairment can request for Hong Kong's South China Morning Post in Braille to be available on board. StudioCX provides Audio/Video on Demand (AVOD) for every passenger and offers up to 100 movies, 350 TV programs, about 1000 CD albums in 25 different genres, 25 radio channels and more than 70 interactive games.

== Accidents and incidents ==
Cathay Pacific has had some incidents and accidents over its history, although none have resulted in a hull loss or loss of life since 1972. Cathay Pacific is generally regarded to have a good safety reputation and has been rated as one of the world's safest airlines.

- On 16 July 1948, Miss Macao, a Cathay Pacific-subsidiary-operated Consolidated PBY-5A Catalina from Macau to Hong Kong was hijacked by four men, who killed the pilot after take-off. The aircraft crashed in the Pearl River Delta near Zhuhai. Twenty-six people died, leaving only one survivor, a hijacker. This was the first hijacking of a commercial airliner in the world.
- On 24 February 1949, a Cathay Pacific Douglas C-47 Skytrain from Manila to Hong Kong crashed near Braemar Reservoir after a go-around in poor weather. All 23 people on board died.
- On 13 September 1949, a Cathay Pacific Douglas C-47 Skytrain departing from Anisakan, Burma crashed on take-off when the right-hand main gear leg collapsed. There were no reported fatalities.
- On 23 July 1954, a Cathay Pacific Douglas C-54 Skymaster from Bangkok to Hong Kong was shot down by aircraft of the People's Liberation Army Air Force in the South China Sea near Hainan Island. Ten people died, leaving nine survivors. After the incident, Cathay Pacific received an apology and compensation from the People's Liberation Army Air Force. It was apparently mistaken for a Nationalist Chinese military aircraft.
- On 5 November 1967, Cathay Pacific Flight 033, operated by a Convair 880 from Hong Kong to Saigon, overran the runway at Kai Tak Airport. One person was killed and the aircraft was written off.
- On 15 June 1972, Cathay Pacific Flight 700Z, operated by a Convair 880 from Bangkok to Hong Kong, disintegrated and crashed while the aircraft was flying at 29,000 feet (8,800 m) near Pleiku, South Vietnam after a bomb exploded in a bag placed under a seat in the cabin, killing all 81 people on board. This remains the last Cathay Pacific incident to involve a total hull loss and passenger fatalities.

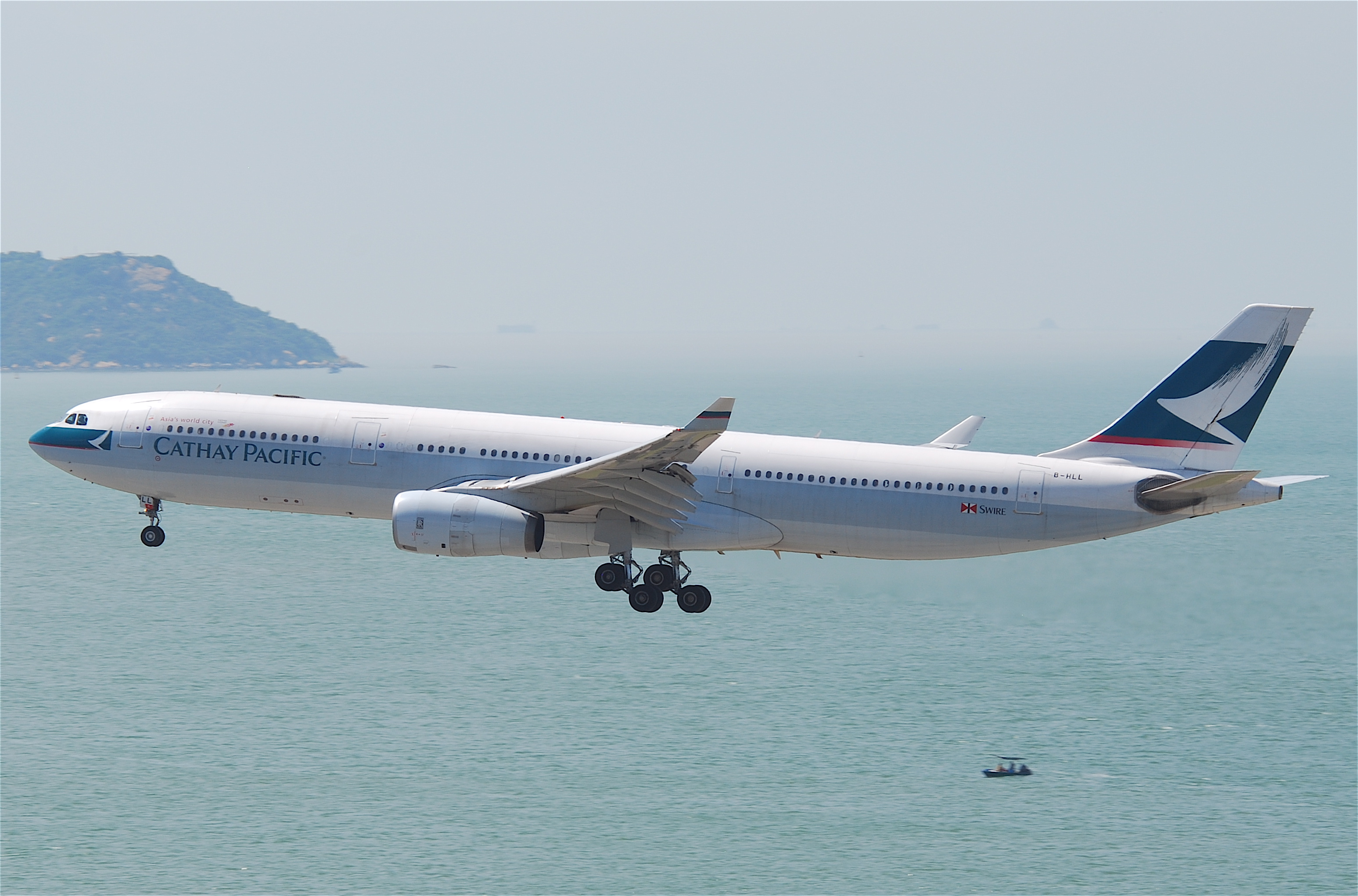
B-HLL, the Airbus A330 involved in the Flight 780 accident

- On 13 April 2010, Cathay Pacific Flight 780, operated by an Airbus A330-342 from Surabaya Juanda International Airport to Hong Kong, landed safely after both engines failed due to contaminated fuel. 57 passengers were injured in the ensuing slide evacuation. The two pilots received the Polaris Award from the International Federation of Air Line Pilots' Associations for their heroism and airmanship.
- On 2 September 2024, Cathay Pacific Flight 383, operated by an Airbus A350-1041 from Hong Kong International Airport to Zurich Airport, experienced a serious incident after a leak in fuel system of the left engine, which caused an engine fire after departing Hong Kong. The plane circled over the sea for more than half an hour to dump fuel before landing safely back in Hong Kong. There were no casualties among the 348 people on board. Following the incident, the airline conducted engine inspections of its A350 fleet and identified fifteen A350s in its fleet with affected engine components. The aircraft was repaired and returned to service.

== See also ==
- List of airlines of Hong Kong
- List of airports in Hong Kong
- List of companies of Hong Kong
- Macau Air Transport Company – subsidiary from 1948 to 1961
- Transport in Hong Kong

== Bibliography ==
- Eather, C.E. (1983). Syd's pirates-A story of an airline. Sydney (N.S.W.): Durnmount.
- Young, Gavin (1988). Beyond lion rock-The story of Cathay Pacific Airways. London: Hutchinson.
- Willing, M.J. (1988). From Betsy to Boeing-The aircraft of Cathay Pacific Airways 1946-1988. Hong Kong: Arden Publishing Co. Ltd.
