= Thomas O. Hardin =

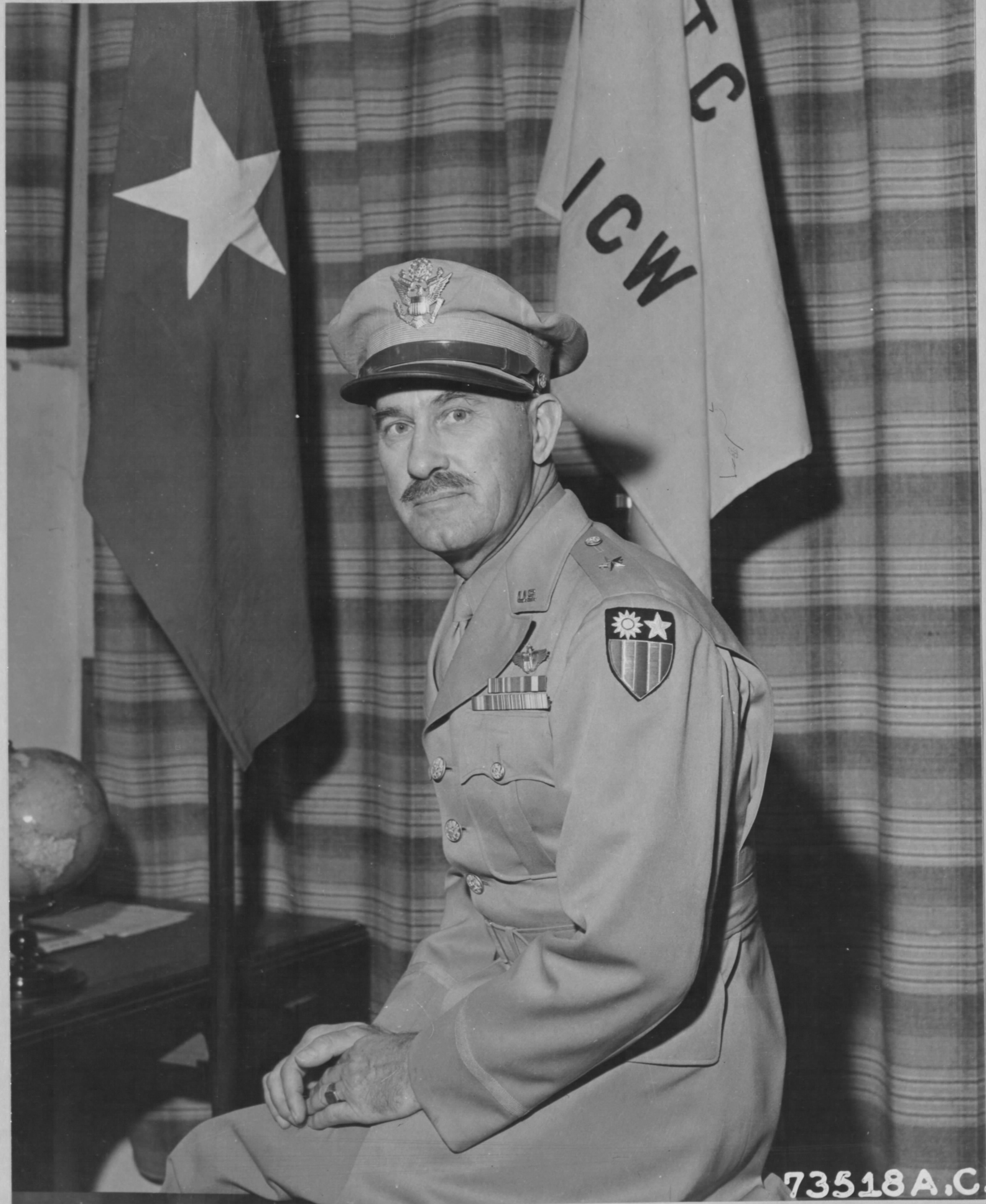
- Born: 15 October 1894; Mexia, Texas
- Died: 18 October 1968 (aged 74)
- Burial place: Arlington National Cemetery
- Spouse: Daisy Brown Hardin
- Military career
- Allegiance: United States
- Branch: United States Army (1917–1919, 1922–1945); United States Air Force (1947–1955)
- Service years: 1917–1919, 1922–1955
- Rank: Major general
- Service number: O-170727
- Commands: Central African Sector; India-China Wing; West Coast Wing; Central Pacific Wing
- Conflicts: World War I; Mexican Expedition; Western Front; World War II; Middle East Theater; China-Burma-India Theater; Central Pacific Area
- Awards: Legion of Merit; Army Distinguished Service Medal; Distinguished Flying Cross; Commendation Ribbon

Thomas Oates Hardin (15 October 1894 – 18 October 1968) was an airline executive and a United States Air Force (USAF) major general who commanded the India-China Wing of the Air Transport Command (ATC) in the China-Burma-India Theater during World War II. As such he directed flights over the Hump. He helped found Southern Air Transport, which became part of American Airlines. Between 1938 and 1940 he was a member of the Air Safety Board. In this role he updated and simplified the Civil Air Regulations, investigated air crashes, and recommended new air safety regulations. After the war he headed the USAF Directorate of Technical Inspection and Flight Safety Research.

== Early life ==
Thomas Oates Hardin was born in Mexia, Texas, on 15 October 1894. He graduated from high school in Rockport, Texas, in 1911, and began a career as a surveyor. He left to work herding cattle, first on Matagorda Island, and then around Ballinger, San Angelo and Winters, Texas. He decided that he wanted to fly, so he took a job with the San Antonio Drug Company, which ran a service flying emergency medical supplies around Texas.

From March 1916, to January 1917 he served with the Mexican Expedition as a civilian contract transport specialist with the United States Army Quartermaster Corps. After the United States officially joined World War I, he enlisted in the Aviation Section, U.S. Signal Corps. He was deployed to France in December 1917, and served in England and France with the 101st Aero Squadron. He returned to the United States in April 1919 and was discharged from the Army the following month.

== Between the Wars ==
Hardin was commissioned as a second lieutenant in the Air Reserve on 2 November 1922, and rated as a pilot. He toured the southwestern United States barnstorming. In 1927, with two Curtiss JN Jennys and a Canuck, he formed Southern Air Transport with A. P. Barrett, becoming the vice president and general manager of the company. Southern Air Transport merged with the Aviation Corporation of New York City in 1929, and he became its director of operations. In January 1930, the Aviation Corporation spun off American Airways as a subsidiary, and he became its general manager. In 1934 the company was acquired by E. L. Cord, who renamed it American Airlines.

In July 1938, President Franklin D. Roosevelt appointed Hardin to the Independent Air Safety Board. He set out to update and simplify the Civil Air Regulations. The result was a fifty page handbook for pilots and student pilots, which was published in April 1939. The board was supposed to have three members, but the third, C. B. Allen, was not appointed until March 1939, and Hardin was frequently at loggerheads with the chairman of the board, Walter Sumpter Smith.

Hardin conducted on-site investigations of many accidents, which he felt was the only way to determine the root cause, while Smith never went to the scene of an accident or attended hearings. But it was not the causes of accidents that they disagreed on, but proposed changes to prevent recurrence. Hardin recommended, for example, that propeller feathering be made mandatory on commercial airliners, but Smith did not agree. While Smith was ill in January and February 1939, Hardin produced over 250 reports on his own. After Allen joined, he and Hardin frequently formed a 2-1 majority. In September, they replaced Smith as chairman with Hardin, which led to Smith's resignation in November.

James H. Roe of Trans World Airlines recalled:

The first thing you have to understand is that real safety costs money, and that’s why they were out to get ASB in 1940. In the old days, before that crash that killed Senator Cutting, the first thing the government would come up with was pilot error, it was just about automatic. Of course pilot error does happen, but what if it was company error, or more likely an error in the government-run facilities? Did they ever come up with government error?

When we got the independent safety board in 1938, we thought our troubles were over because we had one of our own men in there, Tom Hardin. Now, Tom Hardin didn’t make too many friends in Washington... Maybe we lost the independent safety board because of his personality or because of the way he was carrying out his duties as chairman.

I do know that Hardin cost the airline companies some money, and he certainly wasn’t popular with them because of that.

The Air Safety Board was abolished in May 1940, and its functions transferred to the Civil Aeronautics Board. For the last seventeen months of the Air Safety Board's existence there had been no fatal airline accidents, but in the first eight months after its abolition there were five.

== World War II ==
Hardin returned to the aviation industry as vice president for safety at Trans-World Airlines. In 1941 he was seconded to the Defense Supplies Corporation, and surveyed air transportation in Latin America for the Civil Aeronautics Board. He was involved in the acquisition of German airlines in Ecuador, Bolivia and Peru at the behest of the U. S. government. This was followed by the acquisition of German and Italian airlines in Brazil and Argentina the following year, after the United States had joined World War II.

In April 1942, Hardin went to Africa and India to assess the requirements for air transport in the Middle and Far East. He was recalled to active duty with the rank of lieutenant colonel on 8 May 1942 and was promoted to colonel on 20 May. He joined the Middle East Wing of Air Transport Command as assistant chief of staff for operations and then deputy commander in East Africa, where he served until 6 June 1943, when the wing split up and he became the commander of the Central African Sector, with his headquarters at Khartoum. He was awarded the Distinguished Flying Cross. His citation read:

When his organization was established he surveyed a number of new air routes so that personnel and equipment could be speeded to this theater of operations. Colonel Hardin was the pilot of the first American transport plane to land at Touggourt, Biskra, Atar, Tindouf, Marrakesh, Adjouf, Dakar and Colomb-Béchar. During the Royal Air Force operations against the German Army in Africa, Colonel Hardin transported vitally-needed gasoline by air to Allied front line bases. He also served as a pilot in Algiers, Tunisia and in Moroccan combat areas surveying fields and airdromes for air support operations. Many of these flights were made in the face of possible enemy interception, over dangerous terrain and with virtually no navigation aids. The unflagging devotion to duty and disregard of personal danger exhibited by Colonel Hardin during these missions reflect the highest credit on himself and the Army Air Forces."

In September 1943, the commander of the ATC, Major General Harold L. George appointed Hardin the commander of the Eastern Sector of the India-China Wing of the ATC on the advice of Brigadier General C. R. Smith, who had known Hardin since the Southern Air Transport days in the 1920s. The Eastern sector, based in Assam, was responsible for flights to China over the Hump, as the Himalayas were known, It was one of the most difficult and dangerous air routes in the world. Hardin came to be both feared and respected. He relieved officers who did not meet his standards, but became known as a commander who would not demand from his men anything that he was not willing to do himself. He also did not let regulations stand in the way of getting the job done. Smith reported:

Hardin is steaming like an old fire engine... I have never seen a man work harder... He usually works in the office in the morning and spends the afternoon going from one field to another. He has probably broken by now most of the Air Force rules about operations.... If Tech rules were enforced here I doubt that there would be an airplane in the air.

In December, the India-China Wing reached the objective that Roosevelt had set for it: 10,000 long tons (10,000 t) in a single month. Roosevelt was so pleased he awarded the wing the Presidential Unit Citation. Hardin was promoted to brigadier general on 1 March 1944, when he replaced Brigadier General Earl S. Hoag as commander of the India-China Wing. Hardin returned to the United States in September 1944, and was awarded the Army Distinguished Service Medal on 14 October.

In December Hardin assumed command of the West Coast Wing of ATC, with its headquarters in San Francisco until 25 April 1945. He then moved to Guam, where he commanded Central Pacific Wing of ATC from 12 May to 6 September 1945. He then returned to the United States and, after a period of leave, was separated from active service on 9 December 1945. His decorations included the Army Distinguished Service Medal, Distinguished Flying Cross, Air Medal, Army Commendation Ribbon and Chinese Certificate of Merit.

== Post war ==
Hardin returned to the aviation industry as executive vice president of Taca Airlines in Central and South America from October 1945 to July 1946. He then became an aviation consultant, specialising in the Middle East and Far East. On 10 October 147, Hardin was recalled to active duty with the United States Air Force (USAF) as chief of the Air Reserve and National Guard Section of the ATC with the rank of colonel. He remained in this role until 13 June 1948. He was relieved from active duty on 15 June, but recalled again on 20 June and promoted to brigadier general on 12 July. He served as chief of the reserves branch in the office of the Deputy Chief of Staff of the Air Force for Operations in Washington, DC, from 21 July 1948 to 8 October 1950. He then headed the Directorate of Technical Inspection and Flight Safety Research at Norton Air Force Base in San Bernardino, California.

== Latter life ==
On 1 February 1955, Hardin retired from the USAF . He was awarded the Legion of Merit for his work with the Inspector General of the Air Force. He then returned to the aviation industry as an executive at Pan Am, where he had responsibility for aspects of the Point Four Program.

Hardin died on 18 October 1968, and was buried in Arlington National Cemetery. His wife Daisy née Brown was buried with him when she died on 4 February 1970. His papers are in the History of Aviation Collection Small Collections at the Eugene McDermott Library of the University of Texas at Dallas.

== Dates of rank ==
Insignia	Rank	Component	Date	Reference
	Second Lieutenant	United States Army Air Service Reserve	2 November 1921	
	First Lieutenant	United States Army Air Service Reserve	2 November 1927	
	Lieutenant Colonel	Army of the United States	8 May 1942	
	Colonel	Army of the United States	20 May 1942	
	Brigadier General	Army of the United States	21 January 1944	
	Brigadier General	United States Air Force Reserve	27 February 1947	
	Colonel (temporary)	United States Air Force	9 October 1947	
	Brigadier General (temporary)	United States Air Force	12 July 1948	
	Major General (temporary)	United States Air Force	8 March 1952	
