= Roy Farrell =

American businessman (1912–1996)

Roy Clinton Farrell
- Born: June 19, 1912; Vernon, Texas, U.S.
- Died: January 3, 1996 (aged 83)
- Occupation: Businessman
- Known for: Co-founder of Cathay Pacific Airways
- Children: 2 sons, 1 daughter
- Relatives: 9 grandchildren

Roy Clinton Farrell (June 19, 1912 – January 3, 1996) was the American co-founder of Cathay Pacific Airways along with the Australian Sydney de Kantzow.

== Early years ==
Farrell was born in Vernon, Texas. He went to China during World War II, and eventually started an export business (Roy Farrell Import-Export Company) in 1945 in Shanghai.

== Aviation career ==
Farrell joined the China National Aviation Company (CNAC) in 1943 and flew in Burma to supply the war effort. He left CNAC to establish Cathay Pacific with Sydney de Kantzow in 1946. Both Farrell and de Kantzow were ex-CNAC pilots who had flown "The Hump", a route over the Himalayan Mountains.

Before forming Cathay Pacific, Farrell attempted to purchase a ship to take advantage of what he rightly perceived to be an opening market in China to goods previously unavailable to it before the war. He was unable to locate any ship for purchase and instead bought a C-47 airplane (the military version of the similar DC-3 airplane). This airplane was named "Betsy". He, along with the crew he assembled, flew the plane from New Jersey through South America, Africa, India and China, eventually ending the trip in Shanghai, and established the Roy Farrell Import Export Company.

His company subsequently purchased another C-47 and this plane was named "Niki". Betsy is permanently on display at the Hong Kong Science Museum; the fate of the original Niki is unknown. A plane painted to resemble Niki is on display at Cathay Pacific's offices at Chek Lap Kok in Hong Kong.

As the business developed, Farrell focused more on the shipping aspects of the company and de Kantzow focused more on flying the aircraft. The early Cathay Pacific pilots were referred to as "Syd's Pirates".

=== Establishment of Cathay Pacific ===
Although initially based in Shanghai, the two men moved to Hong Kong and incorporated Cathay Pacific Airways on September 24, 1946. They named it "Cathay" because it was the medieval name given to China, derived from "Khitan", and "Pacific" because Farrell speculated that they would one day fly across the Pacific. The Chinese name for the company comes from a Chinese idiom meaning "Grand and Peaceful State".

=== Later aviation ventures ===
He then established Amphibian Airways in the Philippines and operated it until 1949 when he returned to Texas to raise his family. He sold his remaining interest in Cathay Pacific in 1953.

== Later years and death ==
Farrell was active in oil and gas exploration and production in Vernon, Texas, until his death in 1996 at the age of 83. He was married twice and had two sons (Roy Farrell Jr. continues to run the oil business as Farrell Oil Company) and one daughter and nine grandchildren.
