= The Hump =

Airlift route in World War II

- Part of the Burma campaign, the South-East Asian theatre of World War II, the Second Sino-Japanese War, the China Burma India Theater and the Pacific Theater of World War II
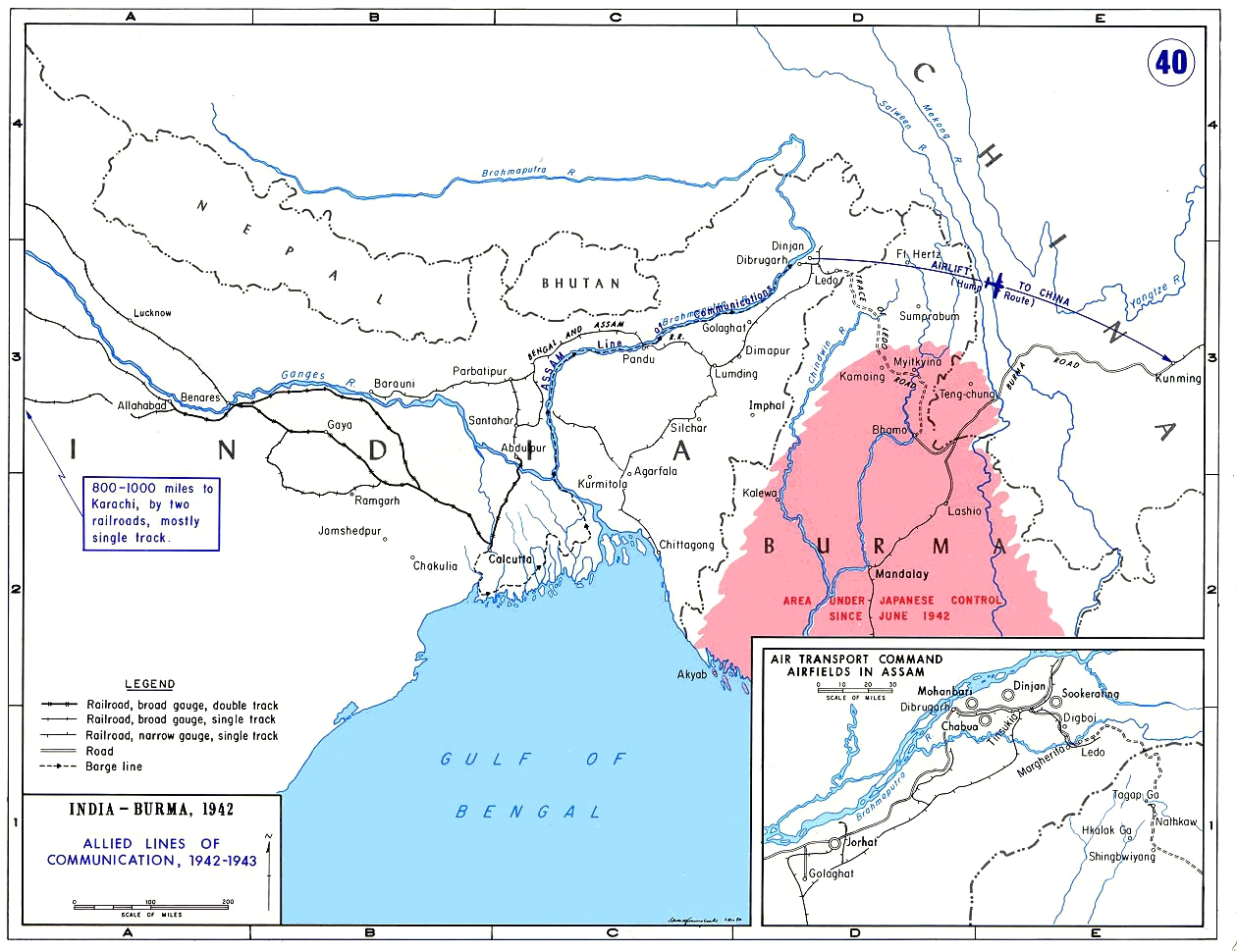
- Allied lines of communication in Southeast Asia (1942–43). The Hump airlift is shown at upper right.
- Location: Assam Province, India, to Kunming city, Republic of China
- Planned: November 1941
- Planned by: United States Army Air Forces, Republic of China Air Force, Royal Air Force, ABDA Command
- Objective: Resupplying the Chinese war effort
- Date: April 8, 1942 – November 15, 1945 (3 years, 7 months and 1 week)
- Executed by: US Tenth Air Force, India-China Division, XX Bomber Command
- Outcome: Allied operation successful
- Casualties: 594 aircraft lost, missing, or written off; 1,659 personnel killed or missing

The Hump
- Traditional Chinese: 駝峰航線
- Simplified Chinese: 驼峰航线
- Literal meaning: Hump Route
Transcriptions
Standard Mandarin
- Hanyu Pinyin: Tuófēng Hángxiàn

The Hump was the name given by Allied pilots in the Second World War to the eastern end of the Himalayan Mountains over which they flew military transport aircraft from India to China to resupply the Chinese war effort of Chiang Kai-shek and the units of the United States Army Air Forces (USAAF) based in China. Creating an airlift presented the USAAF a considerable challenge in 1942: it had no units trained or equipped for moving cargo, and there were no airfields in the China Burma India Theater (CBI) for basing the large number of transport aircraft that would be needed. Flying over the Himalayas was extremely dangerous and made more difficult by a lack of reliable charts, an absence of radio navigation aids, and a dearth of information about the weather.

The task was initially given to the USAAF's Tenth Air Force, and then to its Air Transport Command (ATC). Because the USAAF had no previous airlift experience as a basis for planning, it assigned commanders who had been key figures in founding the ATC in 1941–1942 to build and direct the operation, which included former civilians with extensive executive experience operating civil air carriers.

Originally referred to as the "India–China Ferry", the successive organizations responsible for carrying out the airlift were the Assam–Burma–China Command (Note: Also called the Assam-Burma-China Ferry Command. The "command" was ad hoc and not an official designation, as was that of its partner branch, the Trans-India "Command".) (April–July 1942) and the India-China Ferry Command (July–December 1942) of the Tenth Air Force; and the Air Transport Command's India-China Wing (December 1942 – June 1944) and India-China Division (July 1944 – November 1945).

The operation began in April 1942, after Japanese forces blocked the Burma Road, and continued daily until scaled down from August 1945. It procured most of its officers, men, and equipment from the USAAF, augmented by British, British-Indian Army, Commonwealth forces, Burmese labor gangs and an air transport section of the Chinese National Aviation Corporation (CNAC). Final operations were flown in November 1945 to return personnel from China.

The India–China airlift delivered approximately 650,000 tons of materiel to China at great cost in men and aircraft during its 42-month history. For its efforts and sacrifices, the India–China Wing of the ATC was awarded the Presidential Unit Citation on 29 January 1944 at the personal direction of President Franklin D. Roosevelt, the first such award made to a non-combat organization.

== Background: the China supply dilemma ==
With the Second Sino-Japanese War raging in China (1937–1945), the Empire of Japan had effectively blockaded the entry of fuel and supplies into China by 1940, pushing the Republic of China government further hinterland to the new wartime capital of Chongqing, further culminating into the Japanese invasion of French Indochina and attack on Pearl Harbor, and necessitating the need in keeping the Chinese well-supplied for the continued fight against the Empire of Japan in the overall war effort. While committed to the success of the "Europe first" strategy of the Allied forces, keeping China well-supplied in the war on the Asian mainland would tie-down more than a million Japanese troops who might otherwise increase threat to the Allied strategic offensive in the Pacific War, had also become a priority. The Japanese invasion of French Indochina closed all sea and rail access routes for supplying China with war materiel except through central/north Asian states with the Soviet Union. That access ended following the signing of the Soviet–Japanese Neutrality Pact in April 1941 due to the need for the Soviets to commit to war against Nazi Germany, and the Burma Road became the only land route where supplies trickled in. The rapid success of Japanese military operations in Southeast Asia threatened this lifeline, prompting discussion of an air cargo service route from India; Chiang's foreign minister, T. V. Soong, estimated that 12,000 tons of materiel could be delivered monthly by air from India if 100 C-47 Skytrain-type transports were committed to an airlift. (Note: Delivery of four tons per day per aircraft was theoretically feasible under ideal conditions of terrain, weather, and aircraft availability.) Chinese Air Force Major General Mao Bangchu was tasked with leading the exploration into suitable air-routes over the dangerous Himalayas in 1941, and commissioned CNAC pilot Charles L. Sharp flying for the first-time, this route which was to become known as The Hump in November of that year.

On 25 February 1942, President Roosevelt wrote to General George C. Marshall that "it is of the utmost urgency that the pathway to China be kept open", and committed ten C-53 Skytrooper transports for lend-lease delivery to CNAC to build its capability to 25 aircraft. When the newly created Tenth Air Force opened its headquarters in New Delhi under the command of Maj. Gen. Lewis H. Brereton in March 1942, it was assigned the responsibility of developing an "India-China Ferry" using both U.S. and Chinese aircraft. Although he was never given command authority over aircraft or personnel, the officer responsible for the India-China Ferry was Brereton's chief of staff Brig. Gen. Earl L. Naiden, who held that responsibility until mid-August. (Note: "India-China Ferry" was an unofficial descriptive of the system used in official correspondence, and not an organized command. On 16 July 1942 the "India-China Ferry Command" became an official command by order of the Tenth Air Force.)

From its onset, the air route was predicated on operating two branches, unofficially deemed "commands": a "Trans-India Command" from India's western ports to Calcutta, where cargo would be transshipped by rail to Assam; and the "Assam-Burma-China Command", a route from bases in Assam to southern China. The original scheme envisioned the Allies holding northern Burma and using Myitkyina as an offloading terminal to send supplies by barge downriver to Bhamo and transfer to the Burma Road. However, on 8 May 1942 the Japanese seized Myitkyina (Note: One of the last Allied aircraft through Myitkyina before it fell was a CNAC DC-3 carrying Brig. Gen. Jimmy Doolittle back from China after the raid on Japan.) which, coupled with the loss of Rangoon, effectively cut Allied access to the Burma Road. To maintain the uninterrupted supply to China, U.S. and other allied leaders agreed to organize a continual aerial resupply effort directly between Assam and Kunming.

== Airlift history ==
=== Haynes, 1942 ===
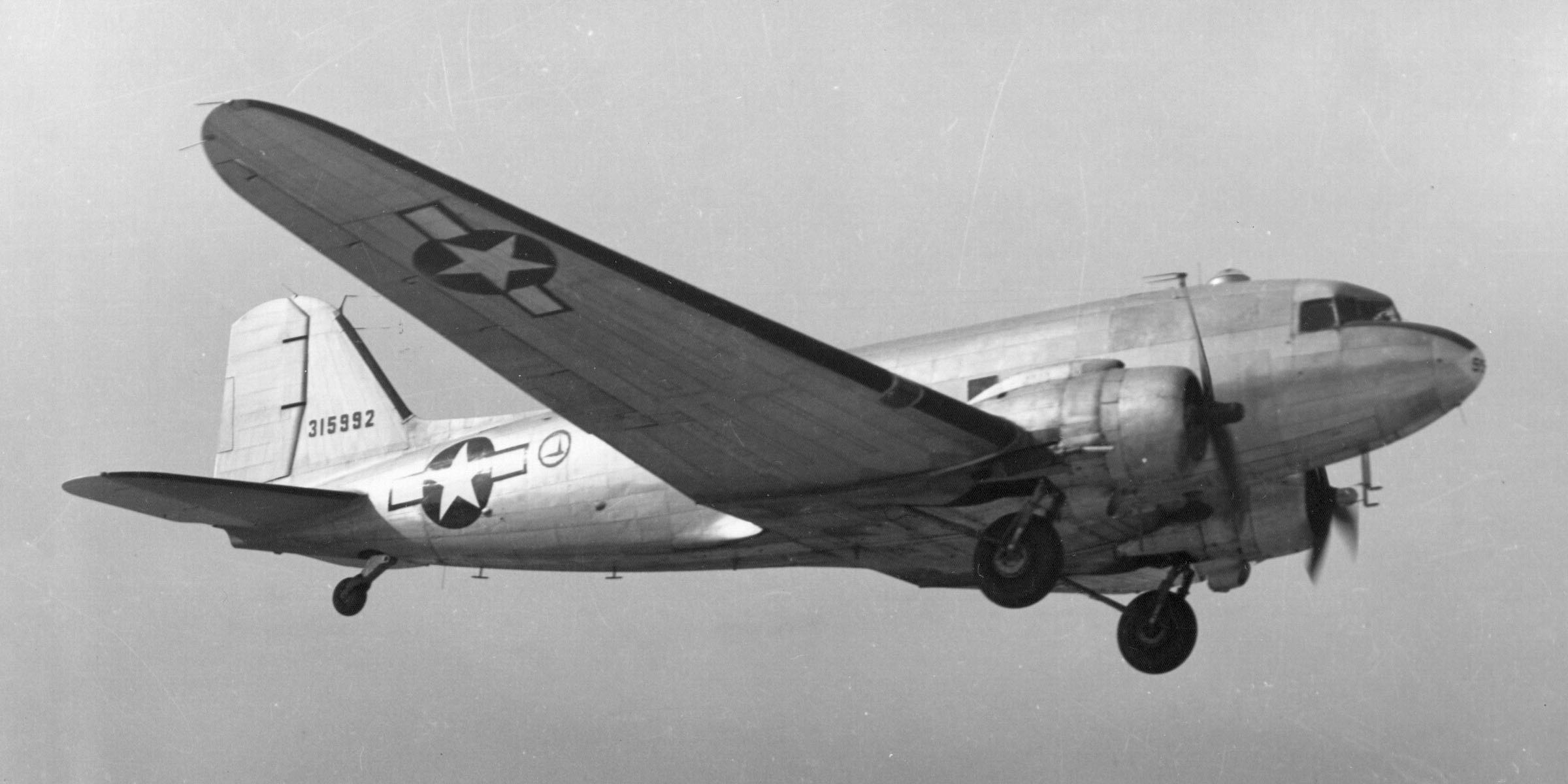
C-47 Skytrain

Tenth Air Force was hampered by a constant diversion of men and aircraft to Egypt, where Nazi Germany was threatening to seize the Suez Canal. Its Air Service Command was still en route by ship from the United States, forcing it to get aircraft and personnel for the India-China Ferry from any available source. Ten former Pan American World Airways DC-3s and flight crews were sent from the trans-Africa ferry route to outfit the new operation. (Note: On 18 February 1942, to protect the route from the Vichy French, the Air Corps Ferry Command militarized Pan Am's operations in Africa. Concurrently it also cancelled all overseas contracts with the civil air carriers except those in the Western Hemisphere.) 25 other DC-3s requisitioned from American Airlines in the United States could not be moved to India due to lack of crews, and were later integrated into the complement of the first transport group committed to the airlift.

The command structure of the India-China Ferry was fractured after senior officers in India and Burma made competing claims for jurisdiction, with part of the authority given to Gen. Joseph Stilwell as CBI theater commander and part remaining with Tenth Air Force, which had also been ordered by Marshall to "co-operate when requested" with the British in defending India. Movement by ground transport of supplies arriving from the United States at the port of Karachi to the airfields, as well as construction of the infrastructure required to support the operation, was the responsibility of the U.S. Army's Services of Supply, commanded in the CBI by Maj. Gen. Raymond A. Wheeler. The airlift was the final leg of a journey of 12,000 mi (19,000 km) from Los Angeles to China often taking four months.

On 23 April 1942, Colonel Caleb V. Haynes, a prospective bombardment group commander, was assigned to command the Assam-Kunming branch of the India-China Ferry, dubbed the Assam-Burma-China Ferry Command. Col. Robert L. Scott, a pursuit pilot awaiting an assignment in China, was assigned as his operations officer and a month later as executive officer. Haynes was a fortuitous choice to be the airlift's first commander, as he had just completed an assignment as a key subordinate of Brig. Gen. Robert Olds. Olds and his staff had founded the Air Corps Ferrying Command in June 1941 and pioneered overseas military air transport, including use of the South Atlantic air route by which aircraft, personnel, and cargo would reach India from the United States. However, at the time the India-China Ferry was conceived, the ABC Ferry Command was not prepared to plan, control, or execute such an operation. Its formal organization was minimal, it had no units of its own, and its few aircraft were committed to establishing air transport routes. By June, however, the ABC Ferry Command had begun a greatly expanded wartime restructuring, and became the Air Transport Command on 1 July.

The first mission "over the hump" took place on 8 April 1942. Flying from the Royal Air Force airfield at Dinjan, Lt. Col. William D. Old used a pair of the former Pan Am DC-3s to ferry 8,000 U.S. gallons (30,000 liters) of aviation fuel intended to resupply the Doolittle Raiders. (Note: The original plan had been to haul fuel over the Hump for use by the Aquila Force, an advanced heavy bomber detachment of the Tenth AF intended to bomb Japan from eastern China. Haynes had been the detachment commander and Scott a volunteer member before the plan was cancelled in favor of the B-25 raid.) The collapse of Allied resistance in northern Burma in May 1942 meant further diversion of the already minuscule air effort. The ABC Ferry Command resupplied Stilwell's retreating army and evacuated its wounded, while establishing a regular air service to China using ten borrowed DC-3s, three USAAF C-47s, and 13 CNAC C-53s and C-39s. Only two-thirds of the aircraft were serviceable at any time. Dinjan was within range of Japanese fighters now based at Myitkyina, forcing all-night maintenance operations and pre-dawn takeoffs of the defenseless supply planes. The threat of interception also forced the ABC Ferry Command to fly a difficult 500-mile (800 km) route to China over the Eastern Himalayan Uplift, which came to be known as the "high hump", or more simply, "The Hump". (Note: While the region and the operation were universally known as "the hump", crews flying the airlift also called the mountainous barrier the "Rockpile".)

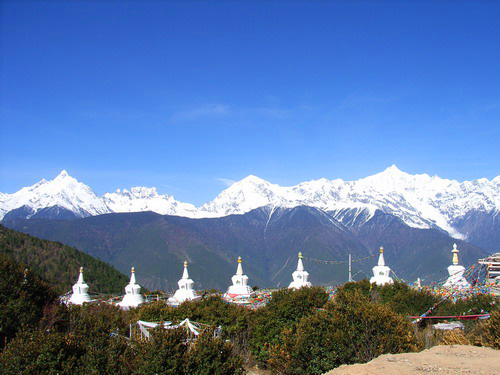
Meili Snow Mountains, prominent landmark on the high Hump

The official history of the Army Air Forces states:

The Brahmaputra valley floor lies 90 feet (27 m) above sea level at Chabua. From this level the mountain wall surrounding the valley rises quickly to 10,000 feet (3,000 m) and higher. Flying eastward out of the valley, the pilot first topped the Patkai Range, then passed over the upper Chindwin River valley, bounded on the east by a 14,000-foot (4,300 m) ridge, the Kumon Mountains. He then crossed a series of 14,000–16,000-foot (4,300–4,900 m) ridges separated by the valleys of the West Irrawaddy, East Irrawaddy, Salween, and Mekong Rivers. The main "Hump", which gave its name to the whole awesome mountainous mass and to the air route which crossed it, was the Santsung Range, often 15,000 feet (4,600 m) high, between the Salween and Mekong Rivers. East of the Mekong the terrain became decidedly less rugged, and the elevations more moderate as one approached the Kunming airfield, itself 6,200 feet (1,900 m) above sea level.

Unfavorable weather conditions along the route were a major contributing factor to its difficulty:

The Assam-Kunming route...[was situated]...in the middle of...three Eurasian air masses that were stirred and conflated by the presence of the Himalayas themselves. Moist warm air from the Indian Ocean to the south produced high pressure that swept north, while cold dry air from Siberia moved south. These lows and highs were extreme, producing violent winds...and when those winds hit the immovable mass that was the world's tallest mountain range, they shot upward at startling speeds until they cooled and then rushed downward in terrifying drafts that hurled airplanes...earthward at stupefying rates of descent...Turbulence inside the cloud mass was severe; pilots reported being flipped upside down by gusts, while many others were unable to report anything because they went missing. Hail, sleet, and torrential rains lashed the aircraft. Thunderstorms built suddenly...[into]...a whirling opaque world that not only meant no visibility but also frequently meant icing. The peaks of the Hump were waiting; the pilots called them "cumulo-granitus"...

The point of view of a veteran crewman who flew the Hump was described in a feature story for a local newspaper years after:

... Let there be no question about it! Flying the Hump was risky business. The air route led first over the Himalayan foothills and finally to the mountains, between north Burma and west China, airspace where turbulence and abominable weather was the norm. Judge for yourself: [the name of] one of the peaks they flew over translated into English as "Elephant Head Gouge Mountain", because "when elephants use a game trail on its side, at one place they have to turn such a sharp corner that their tusks scrape grooves into the rock." ...

Innumerable problems with the Indian railway system meant that aircraft assigned to the airlift often carried their cargo all the way from Karachi to China, while much cargo took as long to reach Assam from Karachi as the two-month journey by ship from the United States. India's highway and river systems were so undeveloped as to be unable to support the mission, leaving air as the only practicable way to supply China in anything resembling a timely fashion.

The first crews and aircraft from the United States went to the 1st Ferrying Group, (Note: Also seen as the "1st Ferry Froup," consisting of the 3rd, 6th, and 13th Ferrying Squadrons) arriving on 17 May at their base at the New Malir Cantonment near Karachi. The group was activated in India in March without personnel or equipment and was assigned to the operational control of the Tenth Air Force over the objections of the commander of ATC, who feared that its planes and crews would be steered into combat units, which did in fact occur at times. Aircraft continued to arrive in small increments through October with flight crews consisting of airline pilots holding Air Corps Reserve commissions who had been called up for active duty specifically for the India-China assignment, and navigators, engineers and radiomen from the USAAF technical training schools. For the remainder of 1942, the 62 C-47s (Note: The group began with 75 transports, but thirteen were diverted to the Middle East en route to India. Of the 62 that reached India between May and October, 15 were destroyed by the end of 1942.) of the 1st Ferrying Group were the backbone of the airlift, flying both branches of the operation from Karachi until August, when it began a three months' relocation to Assam.

In the first two months of the airlift the USAAF delivered only 700 tons of cargo and CNAC only 112 tons, (Note: The totals include 420 tons of gasoline (including the 30,000 U.S. gallons (110,000 liters) of fuel and 2 tons of oil allotted for the Doolittle force), 208 passengers, a million rounds of ammunition, 4.5 tons of Bren guns, 8 tons of bombs, 1.5 tons of radio equipment, a 1.5-ton jeep, two small aircraft, 46 tons of aircraft spare parts, 7 tons of medical supplies, 38 tons of food, 15 tons of "other" and "special" equipment, and two tons of cigarettes".) and tonnage fell for both June and July, mostly due to the full onset of the summer monsoon. (Note: The summer monsoon begins in mid-May and typically lasts until the end of October, during which time 200 inches of rain is common in Assam.) In July, CNAC quadrupled its tonnage to 221 tons, but 10AF C-47s brought only 85 net tons (Note: "Net tons" excludes the weight of fuel transported to China to enable the return of the aircraft to India.) of materiel and personnel into China.

=== Tate, 1942 ===
On 17 June 1942, Haynes continued on to China to take up an assignment as bomber commander of the China Air Task Force, Tenth Air Force's eastern appendage commanded by Brig. Gen. Claire L. Chennault. Scott was left in command for several days before he too was ordered to China to command the first U.S. fighter group in the CATF. On 22 June Col. Robert F. Tate (who like Haynes was a bombardment officer) was named to replace Haynes, but he was also in charge of the Trans-India Command in Karachi and remained in that capacity. (Note: Because of the slowness of reinforcements in reaching the CBI, the Trans-India Command was never formally manned or equipped with its own personnel and aircraft in its three months of existence. Loaded aircraft of the ABC Ferry Command were transited to and from Karachi carrying out both missions, and Tate remained in Karachi to coordinate their movements.) Lt. Col. Julian M. Joplin, acting at the direction of Naiden, for all practical purposes commanded India-China operations until 18 August. Tate took actual command on 25 August, when Naiden was forced to return to the United States, (Note: Weaver states the return was for a "stomach disorder". However other sources indicate the abrasive Naiden may have been insubordinate to a British general officer, and one alleges that Stilwell had him relieved for "financial impropriety". Whatever the case, Naiden was reduced back to colonel on November 6 and held two training commands before his death in 1944.) although like Naiden he delegated direction of airlift operations to Joplin. Effective 15 July 1942, the two branches of the India-China Ferry merged into the India-China Ferry Command, an organized component of the Tenth Air Force.

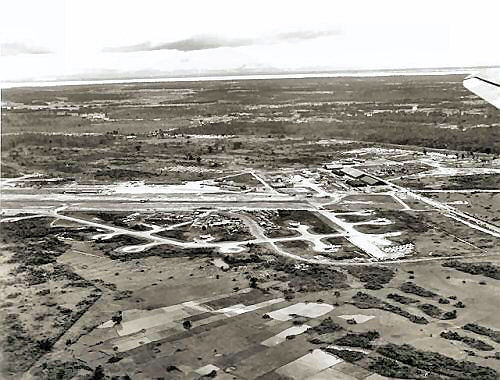
Chabua Airfield. The white line at the top is the Brahmaputra River.

Tate was immediately and severely handicapped when the best pilots and 12 aircraft of the airlift went west to Egypt with Brereton on 26 June. Despite the use of the 1st Ferrying Group, the buildup of the airlift grew very slowly during the summer monsoon. Overuse of the small number of aircraft available, spotty maintenance, and a lack of spare parts led to numerous groundings until overhauls could be effected. In particular the lack of replacement tires and spare engines held down operations even after eight of the C-47s sent to the Middle East returned in August. For a short time engines intended for P-43 fighters of the Chinese Air Force were adapted for use on C-47s, but the supply of those proved small.

Although three bases constructed by the British on tea plantations at Chabua, (Note: All-weather base, headquarters of 1st Ferrying Group, with 3rd Ferrying Squadron based there.) Mohanbari, (Note: Base of the 6th Ferrying Squadron until the end of the dry monsoon.) and Sookerating (Note: Base of the 13th Ferrying Squadron until the end of the dry monsoon.) were declared operational in August 1942, and construction of a fourth began at Jorhat, none were expected to be ready for all-weather operations before November or December because of problems with unskilled indigenous labor and the failure of promised heavy equipment to arrive from the United States. Throughout the monsoon rains Dinjan remained the chief transport base. The dismal results of the India-China Ferry to this point led to a proposal in Washington to turn over control of the operation entirely to CNAC, which would place U.S. military personnel in a combat area under foreign civilian control. Stilwell vigorously and successfully opposed the plan. He reinforced his position by insisting that CNAC lease its C-53s and crews participating in the airlift to the USAAF to assure that they would carry only essential cargo and not commercial activity. Losses of transports increased sharply, with the airlift's first loss to accident on 23 September 1942, presumably from icing.

Protection of the aerial supply line became the primary mission of the Tenth Air Force. When the summer monsoon ended, the Japanese were expected to try to sever the last remaining connection to China, and although 10AF's CATF was adequate for the defense of the eastern end, little had been done to create an antiaircraft defense around the four Assam airfields. The 51st Fighter Group was nominally responsible for fighter protection, but two of its three squadrons had been stripped of their aircraft and personnel in July to equip the group's third squadron and round out the newly activated 23rd Fighter Group, both in China with the CATF. The 51st FG remained in Karachi awaiting aircraft and personnel. (Note: The 51st arrived in India on March 12. It had originally sailed for the Philippines before 7 Dec 41 but had been recalled, reassigned, diverted and delayed since the start of the war. All but 10 of its original complement of 70 P-40s had been diverted by ship to reinforce Java and had been lost at sea at the end of February.) Requests for more antiaircraft guns, a weather squadron, and radios and landline communications equipment for an early warning system were immediately approved but went unfulfilled for a variety of reasons. (Note: An example of the exasperating difficulties encountered by 10AF was its request for radio equipment for 20 early warning stations. Even though only five sets were approved, and there was no delay in transferring personnel to operate them, the equipment was lost. It was eventually traced to Natal, Brazil, where it have been unloaded and then forgotten. It finally arrived in India in 1943 just before the next wet monsoon would halt Japanese air operations.) The India Air Task Force, the western combat force of the Tenth Air Force, was activated on 3 October with nine squadrons, none fully operational. Haynes was promoted to brigadier general and placed in command. The 51st FG had been re-equipped with P-40s, but had trained pilots sufficient for only one squadron, which Haynes sent to Dinjan.

The long-anticipated air attack by the Japanese took place late in the afternoon of 25 October. 100 bombers and fighters, bombing from 10,000 feet (3,000 m) and strafing from 100 feet (30 m), achieved complete surprise. The only defense provided came from three P-40s aloft on patrol, and six others which took off and gave pursuit. Dinjan and Chabua were heavily bombed, with nine transports and twenty fighters destroyed or badly damaged by low-level strafing. The next day Sookerating was strafed by 30 fighters, again without warning, but damage was confined to a single storage building containing food and medical supplies. A third raid struck Chabua on 28 October but missed the field entirely. The India Air Task Force had flown reconnaissance missions over the captured airfield at Myitkyina all summer, but the Japanese mounted the raids from Lashio or bases in southern Burma, equipping their fighters with external fuel tanks.

Haynes responded by moving the other squadron of the 51st FG to Sookerating, while the China Air Task Force was ordered to launch a series of attacks by B-25s against Lashio. While Chennault complied, he did not believe that the Japanese strikes originated there and the rift between him and Tenth Air Force grew wider. Whatever the case, the Japanese raids were not repeated in 1942. In June 1943, following small, sporadic raids during the dry season, the entire fighter strength of the India Air task Force, amounting to less than 100 P-40s, was organized as the Assam American Air Base Command (later the 5320th Air Defense Wing, Provisional), specifically to protect the Assam airfields.

=== Alexander, 1942–43 ===
"In conformity with recently announced War Department policy and to provide more efficient operations of the India-China transport line the First Ferry Group will be taken over on December 1st by AAF Air Transport Command. Col. E. H. Alexander is being designated Commanding Officer of the India-China Wing, Air Transport Command, with selected professional operator as Assistant."
Marshall to Stilwell, 21 Oct. 42.

The airlift was evaluated by the USAAF in October 1942 and the attitudes of Tenth Air Force's commanders regarding the feasibility of the operation were characterized as "defeatist". (Note: The study was conducted for the USAAF Inspector General "in the field" by Frank D. Sinclair, Aviation Technical Adviser of China Defense Supplies, Inc.) Living conditions for airlift flight crews and support personnel, particularly at Dinjan, were described as "by far the worst in the entire theater", with primitive quarters, poor sanitation, bad food and mess facilities, pervasive disease, and lack of recreation. Apathy became widespread and morale dropped to a "dangerous point," with the feeling among the troops that as part of the Tenth Air Force, they were "illegitimate children".

After reviewing the evaluation, the Air Transport Command on 13 October offered to take over the operation. Eight days later it was instructed to do so effective 1 December 1942, and activated the India-China Wing ATC (ICWATC), commanded by Col. (later Brig. Gen.) Edward H. Alexander, who was Stilwell's air officer. Like Haynes, Alexander had been a founding member of ATC in 1941 as executive officer of the Ferrying Command. ICW reported directly to ATC's chief of staff in Washington, D.C., Col. (later Maj. Gen. and ATC deputy commander) Cyrus R. Smith (under the supervision of Headquarters USAAF), ending the division of authority under which the India-China Ferry Command had labored. (Note: A tactical airlift historian makes the claim that the transfer of the airlift to ATC was "actually a violation of the orders under which the USAAF had been formed," reasoning that as a "USAAF organization" ATC usurped "a responsibility of air forces under theater command." Because the India-China Ferry Command was a theater operation, it should therefore remain under a theater commander. Aside from the fact that the transfer was approved and commanded by the Army Chief of Staff on the basis of a strategic planning judgment made by the commanding general of the USAAF, a fellow member of the Joint Chiefs, the argument misses the point that the USAAF was forced to create the India-China Ferry Command as a combat organization because no other resources were yet available, and as such was vulnerable to conflicting demands from commanders in the theater that degraded its effectiveness. The issue had historically been the major point of contention between the Air Corps and ground forces since 1920 and the initial setup of the airlift went against Air Corps thinking if not doctrine. The USAAF then disbanded the India-China Ferry Command, which removed the airlift from the purview of theater command, and replaced it with a non-combat operation using resources (ATC) that had not been available seven months earlier, making it subject to fewer diversions from its mission. It was part of a global supply chain that passed through several theaters getting to India, making that independence even more crucial. 10AF had coveted the airlift as a means of acquiring needed tactical airlift assets, but would soon receive transports of its own, and thus freed of the airlift burden, could concentrate on its combat responsibilities. McGowen's criticism approached the transfer from the point of view of a modern Air Force (i.e. independent service) tactical airlift partisan to whom such considerations were moot.) The 1st Ferrying Group was returned to ATC and redesignated the 1st Transport Group. Its 76 C-47s were augmented in January 1943 by the addition of three Consolidated C-87 Liberator Express transports (a derivative of the B-24 Liberator), which increased to 11 in March and a projected total of 50 by the end of the summer. (Note: However from the outset the C-87s proved to be both difficult and very dangerous to handle and reinforcements were hard-pressed to keep up with losses.)

USAAF Commanding General Henry H. Arnold observed first-hand the hazards of "flying the Hump" in February 1943 when the combat crew flying Argonaut, the B-17 that transported his party, became lost as they flew to Kunming following the Casablanca Conference. (Note: En route to Kunming, Arnold stopped at New Delhi to confer with Stilwell. He arrived at Dinjan on February 4, intending to remain overnight, but when he found that Stilwell and Field Marshal Sir John Dill had flown on, impulsively decided to fly the Hump at night. 10AF commanding general Clayton Bissell and his personal pilot accompanied Arnold and assured him they knew the route, part of which was over Japanese-occupied territory. After an early evening takeoff, Arnold's navigator experienced altitude sickness in the unpressurized bomber. Navigation beacons failed to work, the radio operator could not raise Kunming by radio, and the B-17 unknowingly encountered a 100-knot tail wind, 50 knots more than had been forecast. Bissell's pilot proved useless. Argonaut had actually flown well past Kunming, and as fuel began to seem critical, the radio operator finally made contact with Kunming station and used its signal as a direction finder. Argonaut landed shortly before two in the morning, four hours overdue.) From his experiences, Arnold later wrote:

A C-87 Liberator transport must consume three and a half tons of 100-octane gasoline flying the Hump over the Himalaya Mountains between India and Kunming (to get) four tons through to the Fourteenth Air Force. Before a bombardment group can go on a single mission in its B-24 Liberators, it must fly the Hump four times to build up its supplies.

With the onset of heavy monsoon rains in March the ATC operation was reduced to operating from the only all-weather base at Chabua (the RAF base at Dinjan was now occupied by CNAC and Tenth Air Force's only P-40 group), but with a critical shortage in flight crews, even ATC's modest goal of 4,000 tons a month was impossible to attain. The 308th Bombardment Group reached its base at Kunming on 31 March 1943 and began two months of "reverse Hump" operations, flying round trips to India to acquire the gasoline, bombs, parts and other materiel it needed to stockpile before flying combat missions. (Note: The 308th BG was commanded by Arnold's protégé and former personal pilot, Col. Eugene H. Beebe.) Using kits developed by the South India Air Service Command Depot, it converted its B-24 Liberators into fuel transports to accomplish the task. The 308th used Chabua airfield was already crowded with more than 80 ICW transports, and its lightly constructed runway was soon "going to pieces" under the weight of the bombers. Jorhat had stronger runways but its taxiways were still unpaved, making it unsuitable for four-engined aircraft. Both Sookerating and Mohanbari were due to have strong concrete runways capable of handling all aircraft, but neither was yet paved and monsoon rains made them inoperable.

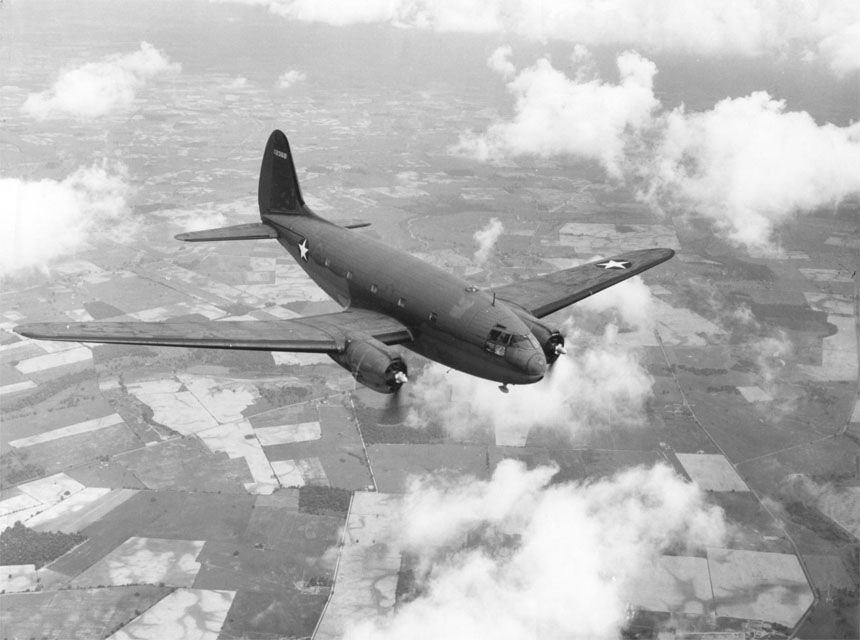
Curtiss C-46 Commando

The first of thirty Curtiss C-46 Commandos (an unproven cargo transport whose performance was significantly superior to the C-47's in cargo capacity and ceiling) arrived in India on 21 April 1943. In May the 22nd Ferrying Group (Note: The "Ferrying" designation for the group and its 77th, 78th, and 88th Ferrying Squadrons was changed to "Transport" on July 1.) began C-46 operations from the still uncompleted base at Jorhat, which had a concrete runway. In June, although the British—and later the U.S. Army's Services of Supply—failed to complete construction of all-weather runways at Mohanbari and Sookerating, the activation of the 28th, (Note: Based at Tezpur; 96th, 97th, 98th Transport Squadrons.) 29th, (Note: Based at Sookerating; 99th, 100th, 301st Transport Squadrons.) and 30th (Note: Based at Mohanbari; 302nd, 303rd, 304th Transport Squadrons.) Transport Groups proceeded, an attempt to expand the C-46's role to meet projected levels of tonnage. (Note: The use of "groups" and component "squadrons" to identify ATC units continued until 1 December 1943, when ATC discarded the group/squadron system and its standardized tables of personnel and equipment, determining the size of its flying units within any wing by exact manning requirements for each base controlled by the wing, giving it the flexibility of moving men and planes around within the wing to meet mission requirements. After 1 December, units were identified by the station numbers of their bases.)

The severe shortage of crews led to pleas from Alexander for additional personnel. "Project 7" was set up by ATC at the end of June to fly nearly 2,000 men, 50 transports and 120 tons of materiel from Florida to India. Despite this, July's tonnage was less than half of its goal. The airfields were nowhere near completion, nearly all of the new pilots had been single-engine instructor pilots, specialized maintenance personnel and equipment had been sent by ship, and the complexities of the new C-46 (see Transport shortcomings below) had become evident. Scorching heat and torrential rains of the summer monsoon completed the undermining of the ambitious goals. The long-delayed work on existing fields resulted in intervention by Marshall in which he ordered Wheeler to have the Services of Supply complete the work by 1 July and issued a deadline of 1 September 1943 to have three additional fields ready for operations, but airfield construction problems were not overcome for several months.

=== Hoag and Hardin, 1943–44 ===
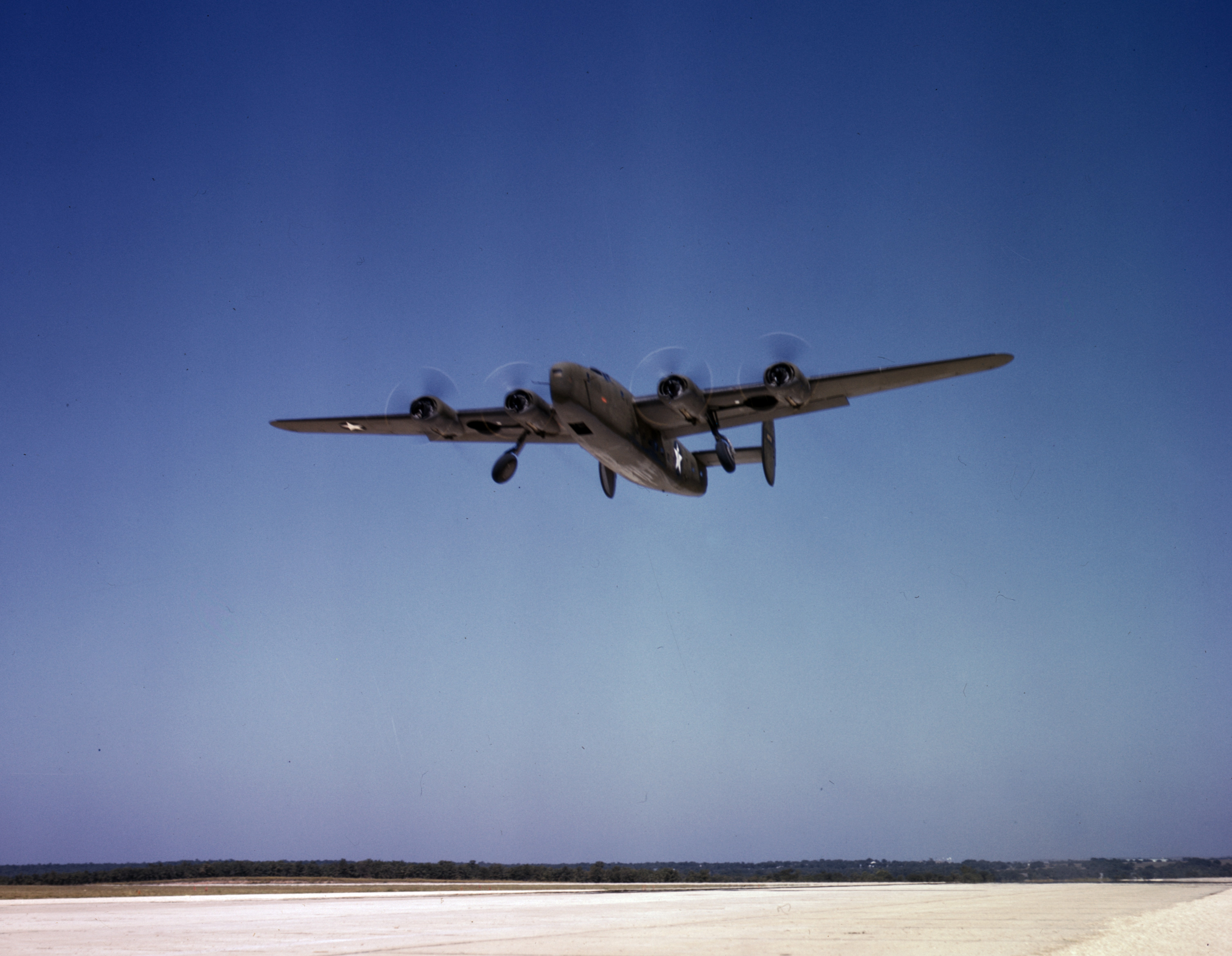
C-87 transport taking off

At his meeting with Arnold, Chiang warned that the price of China's cooperation with Stilwell to reconquer Burma was a 500-plane air force and delivery by the airlift of 10,000 tons a month. In May 1943, at the Trident Conference, President Roosevelt ordered ATC to deliver 5,000 tons a month to China by July; 7,500 tons by August; and 10,000 tons by September 1943. This came about as Marshall and Arnold sent Maj. Gen. George E. Stratemeyer, the Chief of Air Staff, on a special mission to India to observe ICWATC operations and report back with recommendations. Similarly, Eddie Rickenbacker flew the Hump in a C-87 to reach China during his fact-finding mission to the Far East and the Soviet Union, and both he and Stratemeyer found ICW's performance seriously deficient. While ICW was carrying more tonnage by virtue of having nearly ten times as many aircraft as CNAC, half of them with a larger load capacity, the Chinese carrier was far more efficient in tonnage lifted per aircraft, by a factor of 2.5 to 1. The primary cause of ATC's failure was the complete inadequacy of its airfield facilities, but other major factors were unsatisfactory performance by overwhelmed aircraft maintenance personnel that grounded a hundred ATC aircraft per day, a predominance of inexperienced pilots (particularly compared to those of CNAC), and a dearth of radio and navigation aids in ATC transports. Rickenbacker and Tenth Air Force commanding general Clayton L. Bissell recommended return of the operation to theater command, but Stratemeyer disagreed, as did Maj. Gen. Howard C. Davidson, who was about to replace Bissell in command of 10AF and had made an inspection tour of his own in June. (Note: Thus when Davidson became 10AF commander on 19 Aug 1943 and Stratemeyer the commanding general of the newly-activated "Headquarters, United States Army Air Forces, India-Burma Sector, China-Burma-India" the next day, control of ICWATC was specifically excluded from both commands.)

Frustration at the failure of the ICW to meet the Trident goals led Arnold to dispatch another inspection team to India in September 1943, led by ATC commander Maj. Gen. Harold L. George. Accompanying George was Col. Thomas O. Hardin, an aggressive former airline executive who had already been overseas a year as head of ATC's Central African Sector. On 16 September, George immediately reassigned Hardin to command the new Eastern Sector of the ICW, to invigorate India-China operations. Alexander was replaced in command of the ICW by Brig. Gen. Earl S. Hoag on 15 October. (Note: Alexander later commanded both the Caribbean and Southwest Pacific Wings of ATC.) In addition to the changes in command, George instituted the "Fireball", a weekly C-87 express flight (see External links for photo essay) by the 26th Transport Group carrying critical spare parts for the transports from the Air Service Command Depot at Fairfield, Ohio, to the ATC service depot at Agra, India.

Japanese fighters based in central Burma began to challenge the transport route near Sumprabum at the end of the summer monsoon. On 13 October 1943, a large number of Japanese fighters assisted by ground observers evaded U.S. fighter patrols and shot down a C-46, a C-87, and a CNAC transport while damaging three others. Despite the doubling of U.S. fighter patrols, similar interceptions on 20, 23, and 27 October shot down five more C-46s. Japanese pilots referred to the shooting down of vulnerable transport aircraft as tsuji-giri ("cutting down a casually met stranger") or akago no te wo hineru ("twisting a baby's arm"). On the last of the interceptions a formation of B-24s on a reverse Hump mission, mistaken for C-87s, claimed eight fighters shot down. Tenth Air Force immediately began attacks on Japanese airfields (Myitkyina was attacked 14 times before the end of the year, mostly by strafers and P-40s using 1000-lb bombs), and ICW moved its route to Kunming even farther north. Only two more C-46s were shot down during the remainder of 1943, both in December.

20 Japanese bombers escorted by 25 fighters bombed the Assam airfields on 13 December 1943 after several days of probing the early warning system without making an attack. Despite an increase in fighter patrols and an alarm issued, the defenders had only twelve minutes warning. U.S. interceptors were unable to climb to the 18,000-foot (5,500 m) altitude of the bombers in time to prevent the bombing, but it only caused slight damage. The raiding force was pursued and attacked, then ran head-on into fighter patrols returning from northern Burma. Serious losses to the raiders apparently convinced the Japanese not to repeat the attacks.

Hardin altered operations by introducing night missions and refusing to cancel scheduled flights because of adverse weather or threat of interception. Although losses to accidents and enemy action increased, and replacements for the high number of C-46s lost ceased entirely for two months, tonnage delivered rose sharply. The operation finally surpassed its objective in December with over 12,500 tons delivered to Kunming after new C-46s loaded with much-needed C-46 spare parts began arriving in numbers. (Note: The 40 C-46s were part of Project 8, an operation to support construction of a gasoline pipeline between China and Assam. 16 new C-47s arrived in November bringing in the ground crews for Project 8 aircraft. Impetus for the pipeline slowed and Project 8 was integrated into the India-China operation, operating from a new base at Misamari. The delay in replacing C-46s had been the result of a modification program to correct the problems experienced during its initial India-China operations.) By the end of 1943, Hardin had 142 aircraft in operation: 93 C-46, 24 C-87, and 25 C-47.

Presidential Unit Citation

President Roosevelt directed that the Presidential Unit Citation be awarded to the India-China Wing in recognition of their service. Hardin was given a month's leave in the United States, promoted to brigadier general, and as the representative of the wing received the award from General Arnold on 29 January 1944, the first awarded to a non-combat unit. Hardin returned to the India China Wing in February 1944, just as the first of a trickle of four-engined Douglas C-54 Skymaster transports arrived in theater (see Operations on the low hump and in China below). With a maximum load ceiling of only 12,000 feet the C-54s were unable to hurdle the high Hump. Japanese interceptors blocked use of eastbound routes at lower altitudes and the C-54s were limited for the time being to freight movement within India or flights between the CBI and the continental United States.

Hardin advanced to command of the ICW on 21 March 1944 when Hoag was transferred to head ATC's European Wing. (Note: The transfer was not entirely routine. The fearful losses suffered by the ICW in the first seven weeks of 1944 prompted Arnold to send C. R. Smith on an emergency inspection trip to India, where Smith met with Hoag. He was appalled to find that the ICW commander was headquartered a thousand miles to the west of his bases, the result of an agreement between George and Stratemeyer, acting at the behest of Stilwell. Although the arrangement did not result as feared by ATC in undue influence by Stratemeyer's staff on Hoag's, the ICW commander had never flown the Hump himself as a result and received all his information from written reports. Smith did fly the Hump during his inspection, however, and it was he who recommended Hardin take over the wing.) A month later, to give Hardin closer personal contact with his growing number of airbases, ICW changed its headquarters from New Delhi to Rishra, north of Calcutta. There, on the 40-acre (160,000 m^{2}) site of the Hastings Jute Mill, Stratemeyer, now a lieutenant general and commander of all USAAF forces in the CBI, established Hastings Army Air Base as the headquarters of the Army Air Forces India-Burma Theater, using a converted 8.5-acre (34,000 m^{2}) mill building to house his headquarters, that of CBI Air Service Command, and ICWATC. Under Hardin, tonnages increased, but so did expectations and frustrations; morale and safety concerns continued to plague the operation. In the first 54 days of 1944, 47 transports were lost. One transport was being lost for every 218 flights, an accident rate of 1.968 planes lost per thousand hours, of one life for every 162 trips flown or 340 tons delivered.

In June 1944, after the capture of the Japanese fighter base at Myitkyina and at the behest of Brig. Gen. William H. Tunner, Col. Andrew B. Cannon was assigned to command the Assam Wing when it was activated the next month. Tunner, who was to become airlift commander following Hardin, anticipated that the end of the fighter threat would see a massive influx of C-54s into the India-China operation. Like Haynes, Alexander, and Tunner, Cannon had been a pioneer in the Air Transport Command, where as a protege of Tunner's he was base commander of Long Beach Army Air Field, where Tunner made his headquarters as commander of ATC's Ferry Division, and commanding officer of the 6th Ferrying Group. On 1 July, ATC reorganized its nine wings worldwide into air divisions, and sectors into wings. The ICW-ATC became the India China Division ATC (ICD-ATC), while the Eastern Sector, carrying out the India-China airlift, was re-designated the Assam Wing, and the Western Sector support organization became the India Wing. The India China Division also had an operational training unit at Gaya and used the service depots of the China-Burma-India Air Service Command at Panagarh, Agra, and Bangalore.

Systems for identifying units and organizations assigned to the airlift changed several times between 1942 and 1945. The final change occurred on 1 August 1944 when the Air Transport Command discontinued the use of station numbers to identify its units and designated them as numbered "USAAF Base Units" with parenthetical modifiers describing their function. USAAF base units collectively identified all permanent party organizations, including flying units, at any particular non-combat base. The flying units were commonly denoted as lettered squadrons, i.e. "Squadron B", within the Base Unit. To illustrate the various organizational changes affecting the India-China airlift, the unit at Chabua under 10AF deployed overseas as the 1st Ferrying Group. It was redesignated the 1st Transport Group on 1 December 1942 to denote that it was an ATC unit. Next it became Station No. 6 (APO 629 New York) on 1 December 1943 when for flexibility ATC no longer fielded groups or squadrons as units. Finally it became the 1333rd USAAF Base Unit (Foreign Transport Station) on 1 August 1944 in conformance with USAAF policy service-wide. Similarly, Headquarters Squadron, Eastern Sector, India-China Wing, established at Chabua on 16 September 1943 to administer the headquarters of the airlift, was redesignated the Headquarters Squadron, Assam Wing on 1 July 1944 when ATC reorganized itself into "divisions" and "wings"; and Squadron A, 1325th USAAF Base Unit (HQ Assam Wing) on 1 August 1944.

=== Tunner, 1944–45 ===
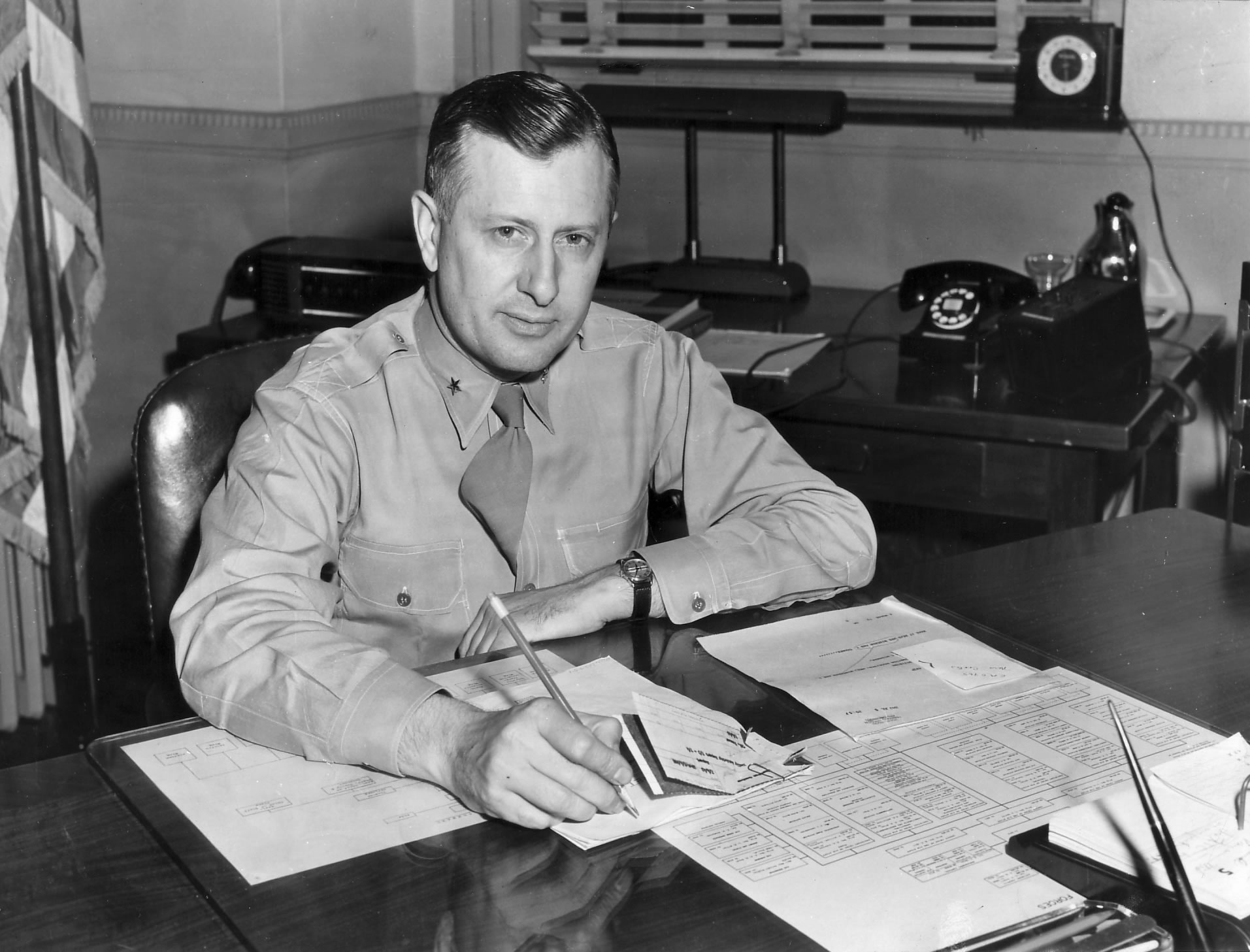
Brig. Gen. William H. Tunner

Hardin was brought back to the United States after spending two years overseas (Note: Hardin commanded the West Coast and Central Pacific Wings of ATC.) and command of the India-China Division went next to Tunner. Selected in the spring of 1944 to succeed Hardin, he chose his key staff and made a theater inspection trip in June that included piloting a C-46 over the Hump. He took command on 4 September 1944 with orders not just to increase the tonnage delivered, but also to reduce the numbers of lives and aircraft lost in accidents, and to improve morale in the India-China Division. Tunner and his staff, using a "big business" approach, completely turned around the operation, improved morale, and cut the aircraft loss ratio in half while doubling the amount of cargo delivered.

Tunner made extensive use of over 47,000 local laborers and utilized at least one elephant to lift 55-gallon fuel drums into the aircraft. (Note: Essentially a publicity stunt, Tunner had an elephant and mahout recruited at Misamari, with the animal named, appropriately enough, "Miss Amari". Photographs also appeared of an elephant named "Elmer" lifting a drum, but their veracity and that of the practice as being standard is not documented.) A daily direct flight called the "Trojan", flown by select C-54 crews, carried a minimum of five tons of highest priority materiel or passengers between Calcutta and Kunming, then brought back critically wounded patients or aircraft engines needing overhaul. Each base was assigned both daily and monthly tonnage quotas to move over the Hump based on the type of aircraft it operated and its distance from the "Chinaside" airfields, as the crews referred to their destinations. Tunner immediately reinstituted military standards of dress, decorum (including inspections and parades), and behavior that had become slack in the previous year, for which he earned the nickname "Willie the Whip".

In Tunner's first month of command, although the ICD delivered 22,314 tons to China, it still incurred an accident rate of 0.682 per thousand hours of flight. By January 1945, Tunner's division had 249 aircraft and 17,000 personnel. It delivered more than 44,000 tons of cargo and passengers to China that month at an aircraft availability rate of 75%, but incurred 23 fatal crashes with 36 crewmen killed. On 6 January a particularly fierce winter storm blew across the Himalayas from west to east, increasing the time of westbound trips by one hour, and caused 14 CNAC and ATC transports to be lost or written off, with 42 crewmen missing, the highest one-day loss of the operation. The accident toll increased in the two months that followed, with 69 planes lost and 95 crewmen killed.

To reduce losses due to mechanical failure, in February 1945 Tunner introduced a maintenance program termed Production Line Maintenance. PLM consisted of having each aircraft due for 50- or 200-hour maintenance towed through five to seven maintenance stations, depending on whether or not an engine change was required. Each station had a fresh maintenance crew trained for a specific service task, including engine run up, inspections, cleaning, technical repair, and servicing, a process that took nearly a full 24-hour day per aircraft to complete. Each base specialized in only one type of aircraft to simplify the process. Despite initial resistance, PLM was successfully implemented throughout the division. (Note: PLM later became standard practice throughout the USAAF.)

Tunner also adopted two measures to lower the number of air mishaps due to inexperience and crew fatigue. To accomplish the first, he appointed Lt. Col. Robert D. "Red" Forman as division training officer to oversee both stringent training and a flying safety program led by Capt. Arthur Norden. After 15 March 1945, the program intensified when Major John J. Murdock, Jr., took over the position of division flying safety officer. Tunner also altered the personnel rotation policy of the ICD, which he saw as a major contributor to crew fatigue. Before Tunner took command, a pilot was rotated back to the United States after completing 650 flight hours over the Hump. Many pilots took advantage of this by flying daily, accumulating the required hours in as little as four months (average about 37 hours in the air every week). But these pilots overworked themselves; the division flight surgeon reported that half of all crewmen suffered from operational fatigue. So, from 1 March 1945, Tunner required all personnel to be in theater for twelve months to be eligible for rotation, which discouraged over-scheduling; he also increased the number of flight hours required to 750.

Under Tunner, the India-China Division expanded to four wings in December 1944. The expansion was necessary to control the multiplicity of USAAF Base Units created as more airfields were opened. (Note: ICD was in charge of 60 USAAF base units at some point between December 1943 and December 1945.) In addition to the Assam and India Wings, ICD added the Bengal Wing, headquartered at Tezgaon, to control C-54 operations, and the China Wing at Kunming. Tunner shifted his veteran commanders to provide leadership to the new wings. Cannon switched to the Bengal Wing, while Col. Richard F. Bromiley moved from the India Wing to the China Wing. Col. George D. "Lonnie" Campbell, Jr. succeeded to command of the Assam Wing. (Note: Cannon and Bromiley, along with "Red" Forman, became USAF brigadier generals with the Military Air Transport Service.)

Both the accident rate and the raw number of accidents decreased notably as a result of these measures with the exception of the C-87/C-109 types, which remained 500% higher than on the C-54. Tunner called for their replacement entirely by C-54s and plans were drawn up to increase the Skymaster force to 272 by October 1945 and 540 by April 1946. With a fleet of 410 C-46s augmenting the ICD, the tonnage lift capability over the Hump was predicted to become more than 86,000 tons per month. A shortage of C-54 engines hampered the plan, which was modified to have a quarter of the force always in a pipeline between India and Florida for engine changes, carrying cargo and passengers as they traveled in both directions. The modified plan was approved in April 1945 and Morrison Field, Florida, was chosen for the maintenance but it proved an impediment to success when C-54s sent there remained at the field for periods five times the seven days originally estimated for turnaround.

In July 1945, the last full month of operations, 662 aircraft of the India-China airlift delivered 71,042 tons, ICD's maximum monthly tonnage. Of this fleet, 332 were ICD transports, but 261 were combat aircraft from USAAF units temporarily assigned to the airlift. (Note: The augmentation was ordered by Stratemeyer when units no longer had a combat mission and the airlift, allocated nearly 49,000 tons for delivery in April 1945 (an increase of 350% from the allocation of 14,000 tons the month Tunner took command), delivered only 44,000. The 7th and 308th Bomb Groups and 443rd Troop Carrier Group operated from India, while the 1st, 3rd, and 4th Combat Cargo Groups were based at Myitkyina. These groups carried more than 20,000 tons in July and 11,000 tons in August.) An average of 332 flights to China was scheduled daily. The India-China Division ATC had 34,000 USAAF personnel assigned, and including indigenous civilians of all nationalities employed in India, Burma, and China, 84,000 persons overall. It boasted an aircraft availability rate of more than 85%. ICD suffered 23 major accidents in July, with 37 crewmen killed, but the Hump accident rate declined to .358 aircraft per thousand hours of flight in July (one-fifth of what it had been in January 1944) and .239 in August.

On 1 August 1945, to celebrate "Air Force Day", (Note: Histories (including Tunner 1955) refer to "Army Air Forces Day", but contemporary documents including the Hump Express consistently call it "Air Force Day".) ICD laid on its largest mission of the airlift. Tunner wrote that ICD flew 1,118 round-trip sorties, averaging two per aircraft, and one C-54 logged three round trips in 22 1/4 hours of operations. 5,327 tons were delivered in one day without fatality, and with no major accidents. (Note: However one accident did occur when a C-46 made a wheels-up landing. Whether or not Tunner considered this a major accident is unknown.) C-87s and C-109s carried 15% of the tonnage without mishap. Before the month ended, nearly 50,000 more tons were delivered. Eight major accidents resulted in only 11 deaths, at a rate of one death for every 2,925 trips (1/18 of what it had been in January 1944). The major accident rate of only 0.18 aircraft lost per 1000 hours was one-third of what it had been when Tunner took command, and one-eighth of that of January 1944.

He considered ICD's safety record to be his greatest achievement. In his memoir Over the Hump, Tunner wrote:

If the high accident rate of 1943 and early 1944 had continued, along with the great increase in tonnage delivered and hours flown, America would have lost not 20 planes that month but 292, with a loss of life that would have shocked the world.

Tunner commanded the division until 10 November 1945. The deputy commander of ICD, former bomber commander Brig. Gen. Charles W. Lawrence, briefly commanded the division before it was disbanded on 15 November 1945.

== Operations on the low hump and in China ==
The first significant diversion of India-China Wing resources to operations in the region other than the Hump airlift began in February 1944. The Japanese attack in Arakan, followed by an offensive against Imphal in March and April, resulted in assistance to the British that Hardin estimated reduced hump deliveries by 1,200 tons. The ICW also had a stake in resistance to the offensive because the threat to Imphal imperiled the Assam-Bengal railroad along which not just Hump cargo but fuel for the airlift passed. The crisis occasioned by the Japanese attack on Imphal led Admiral Louis Mountbatten, the commander-in-chief of the Allied South East Asia Command, to request 38 C-47 aircraft to reinforce Imphal. Mountbatten had no authority to divert planes from the Hump, but he was backed up by two of the principal American commanders in the theater: Major General Daniel I. Sultan, the deputy commander of the CBI Theater, and Stratemeyer, who in addition to all his other duties commanded SEAC's Eastern Air Command, which for all practical purposes made him Mountbatten's air commander. (Note: Stratemeyer had been selected to go to the CBI more or less as an ambassador at large to handle just such problems. Command of EAC had been added to his responsibilities of coordinating ATC airlift activities for Arnold, controlling supply and training of 14AF for Chiang, and defense of the India-China bases and air routes for the US. Joint Chiefs.) After the request was approved, ICW provided 25 C-46s as the equivalent of 38 C-47s. (Note: Taylor writes that the British originally wanted 63 C-47s. After review by Gen. William D. Old and Air Marshal John Baldwin, the recommended figure was 38, which was agreed to by Lt. Gen. William J. Slim. The EAC chief of staff, USAAF Brig. Gen. Charles B. Stone, then concluded 30 was sufficient. Mountbatten changed it back to 38 for the formal request to the U.S. chiefs of staff.) These were attached to the EAC Troop Carrier Command (Note: EAC Troop Carrier Command was commanded by Brig. Gen. William Old, who had flown the initial mission over the Hump in 1942.) to support the British and were used to fly the personnel and light equipment of the 5th Indian Division to Imphal and Dimapur, where it arrived in time to thwart the Japanese offensive.

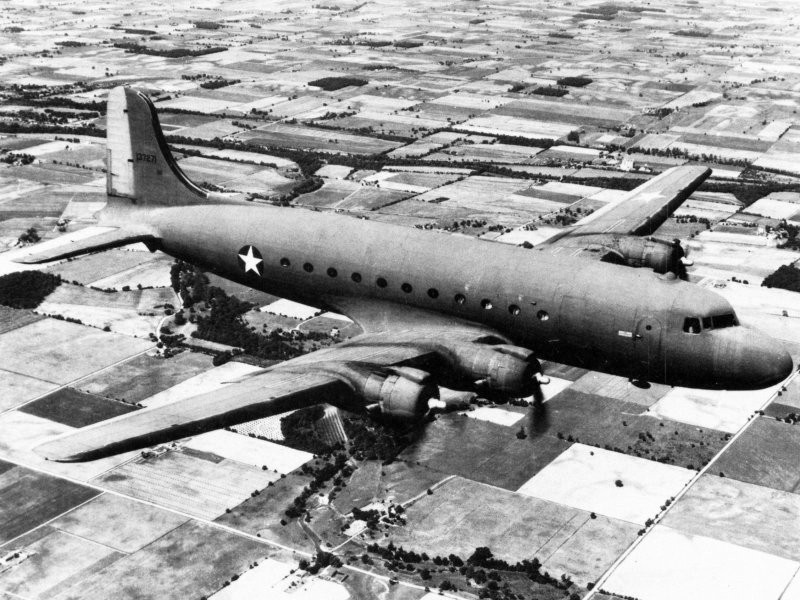
Douglas C-54 Skymaster

The next month, to reinforce Stilwell's planned offensive into Burma, the ICW flew 18,000 Chinese troops west across the Hump to Sookerating, which resulted in a net reduction to the India-China effort of at least 1,500 tons. However, the capture in May 1944 of Myitkyina airfield by American and Chinese troops of Stilwell's command deprived the Japanese of their principal fighter airfield threatening Allied aircraft flying the Hump. The field immediately became an emergency landing strip for Allied aircraft even though fighting continued in Myitkyina town until August 1944. ICD continued its contribution to this success by flying in from southern India a regimental-sized force of combat engineers and their support, including heavy equipment, for airfield construction. The capture of Myitkyina allowed ICD C-54s, which had ceiling limitations that precluded flying Route Able (the High Hump), the regular use of a second, more direct route, designated Route Baker but unofficially dubbed the "Low Hump".

In October 1944, after Gen. Tunner took command of the India-China Division of Air Transport Command, increased numbers of C-54s, sometimes escorted by Allied fighters based at Myitkyina, greatly increased tonnage levels flown to China from India. The C-54, which could at ten tons carry five times the cargo load of the C-47 and twice that of the C-46, replaced both twin-engined transports as the primary lifter of the operation. The expansion of bases resulted in the formation of eastbound Routes Easy, Fox, Love, Nan, and Oboe, and of westbound Route King.

=== Support of XX Bomber Command ===
From April 1944 to January 1945, the India-China Division was also tasked with supporting Operation Matterhorn, the B-29 Superfortress strategic bombing campaign against Japan from forward bases around Chengtu in central China. Arnold originally envisioned Matterhorn units as being self-sustaining, bringing in their own fuel in hundreds of C-109s (see Transport shortcomings below) and other materiel using B-29s and 20 C-87s as their own "air transport service". The concept proved to be flawed from the outset when the planned 300-bomber force was reduced to a single combat wing of 150 bombers before it left the United States. B-29s of the XX Bomber Command, stripped of guns and other equipment and fitted with four bomb bay tanks, were used as fuel tankers while tactical aircraft hauled other supplies, including bombs, but were unable to bring enough materiel over the Hump from their permanent bases around Calcutta in India to begin missions. XX BC turned to ICD for additional support when its target date for commencement of missions was repeatedly postponed.

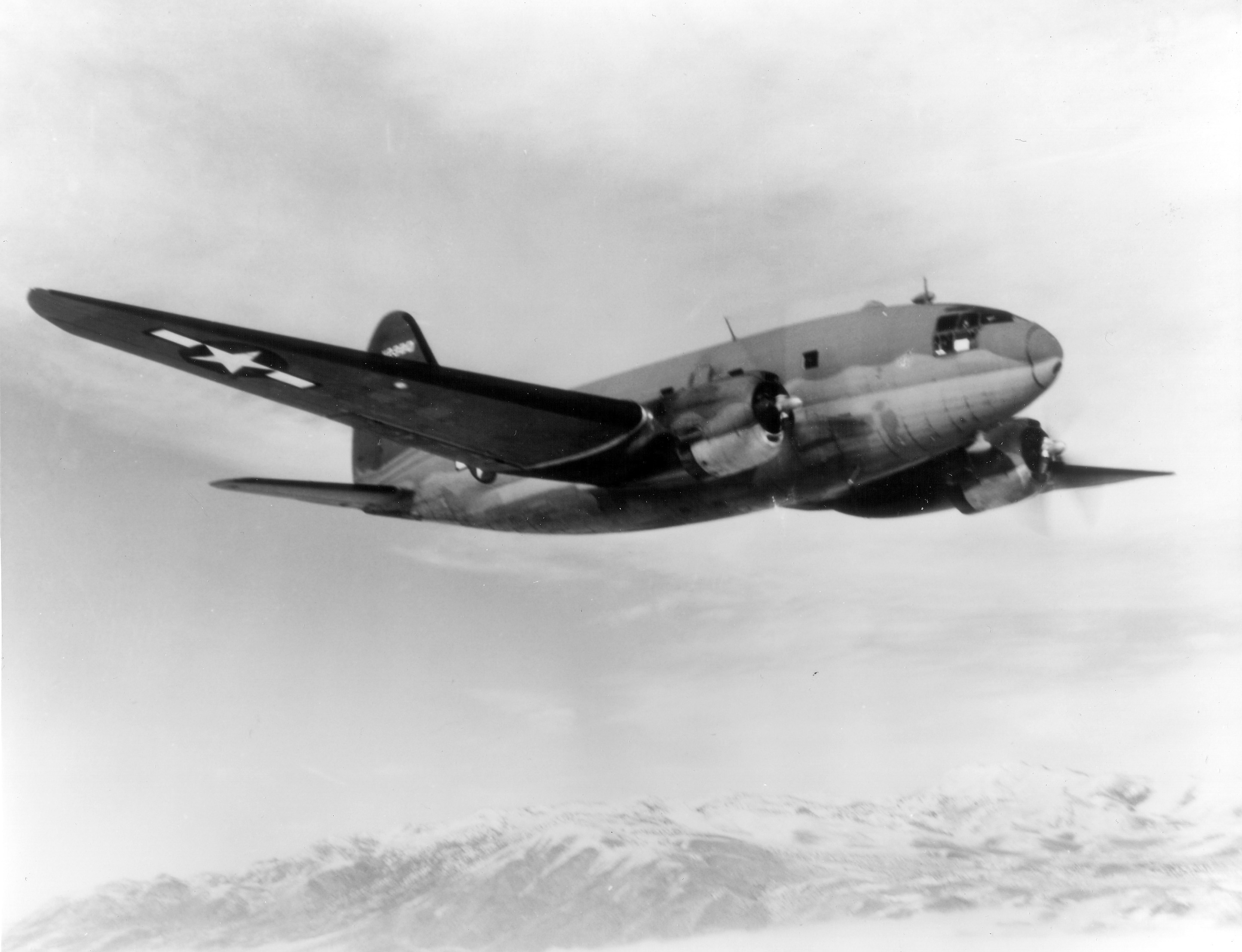
Curtiss C-46 Commando

ATC's North African Wing had already provided stopgap support by transporting 250 spare B-29 engines to the CBI in April and May 1944, using 25 C-54s over a 6,200 mi (10,000 km) shuttle route from the port of Casablanca to Calcutta that came to be called the "Crescent Blend" (Note: The route was a "blend" of sea and air transport totaling 9,800 mi (15,800 km) from Newark, New Jersey, to Casablanca to Calcutta. The C-54s used were known as "Mission 10".) until three special mission C-46 squadrons—created in early 1944 under the code name "Moby Dick"—were ready to carry out supply operations for XX Bomber Command. Designated the 1st, 2nd and 3rd Air Transport Squadrons (Mobile), each was intended to be a self-contained unit of twenty C-46s, flight crews, maintenance and engineering specialists, and a full complement of station operation personnel, although when first committed the service elements had not yet been integrated. They arrived in the CBI in June 1944, with the 1st and 2nd MATS based at Kalaikunda, West Bengal, taking over the "Crescent Blend" shuttle and bringing in over 100 spare engines per month, while the 3rd MATS was sent forward to the ICD base at Kunming to augment the India-China airlift.

Of 42,000 tons of materiel delivered before XX BC abandoned its China bases and returned to India, the ICD moved almost two-thirds. During the last three months of bombing operations from China, XX BC quickly phased out use of its B-29s to haul cargo, and ICD supplied all of XX Bomber Command's materiel except bombs, which B-29s toted over the mountains in "reverse Hump" missions. Lt.Col. Robert S. McNamara created a statistical control section to create adjustable schedules that tracked the variable.

XX BC had the unfortunate coincidence of arriving in the theater just as the Japanese started a major offensive in East China to open a corridor for lines of communication to its forces in Indochina, seize the airfields of Chennault's Fourteenth Air Force situated in that corridor, and possibly knock China out of the war. The load allocations that ICD had to commit to XX BC early on caused "mutual recriminations" between XX BC, ICD and Chennault, from whom most of the altered allocation tonnage was taken, with each blaming the other for problems that ensued. The Japanese offensive continued inexorably all summer and into the fall, threatening the efficacy if not the very existence of 14AF. Relations were never entirely smoothed with Chennault, but workable compromises were eventually fashioned by Stratemeyer, Hardin and Tunner to accomplish the tasks necessary to keep 14AF in the fight. Supplying Matterhorn during the concurrent crisis did have the positive effect of increasing the resources and effort committed to the airlift, and recognition by all involved that ICD was the only agency that could efficiently handle the logistics.

When ATC reorganized on 1 August, the MATS squadrons maintained a separate identity from the newly created USAAF Base Units, but each flew hundreds of Hump missions, delivering aviation fuel and engines. Because India-China operations were of extraordinary length from Kalaikunda—requiring an intermediate stop at Jorhat—its two squadrons were transferred to ICD when XX Bomber Command began planning the reduction of its operations in November 1944. On 30 October the 2nd MATS moved to Dergaon, East Bengal, and later to Luliang, China, where it was disbanded in June 1945 and became Squadron B, 1343rd USAAF Base Unit.

=== Operations Grubworm and Rooster ===
Because C-47s and C-46s which landed in China were temporarily beyond ATC control, they were constantly being diverted for local emergencies by Chennault's and China Theater commander Lt. Gen. Albert C. Wedemeyer's forces, disrupting the flight crew rest and aircraft maintenance schedules necessary to maintain tonnage. To alleviate the situation and also provide the additional support needed by the combat forces, 50 C-47s and 20 C46s were permanently based in China after October 1944 for internal movement of cargo and to assist the India-China airlift when gaps in local scheduling permitted. Most of the remaining C-47s were eventually sent to bases in Burma and continued India-China missions over the lower routes. They proved their continuing usefulness by playing prominent roles in various support missions within China in 1944 and 1945.

Between 5 December 1944 and 5 January 1945, C-46s and crews were attached to the Tenth Air Force to augment "Operation Grubworm". (Note: The operation was planned as "Operation Glow Worm", but changed when Tenth Air Force Col. S.D. Grubbs was placed in charge.) This was the relocation of the 14th and 22nd Chinese Divisions, located in reserve on the Stilwell Road near Myitkyina, to bases around Kunming. Chiang and Wedemeyer proposed to the Combined Chiefs of Staff, over the objections of Mountbatten, to relocate the divisions to counter a Japanese offensive seeking to capture the Kunming airfields. The operation was approved with the proviso that it not strain Tenth Air Force's extensive air transport system supplying Allied ground operations in Burma. IDC provided the C-46s of the mobile air transport squadrons and all of its China Wing C-47s to provide the necessary augmentation. (Note: The China Wing C-47s were assigned to haul newly trained Chinese troops from North China to Yunnan Province.)

The 2nd MATS moved in entirety from its base at Dergaon to Luliang Field, China, completing the deployment by December 13. The 1st MATS operated from Ledo, and ICD's 1348th USAAF Base Unit at Myitkyina South airfield coordinated the entire operation and provided the staging base for refueling all transports. The C-46s moved the 14th Division from five airfields in Burma, including a field at Nansin whose construction was completed December 4. Takeoffs there were subject to artillery and sniper fire. The 1348th Base Unit scheduled operations 24 hours a day and in bad weather, although the operation was suspended between 16 and 22 December when the situation in China seemed improved. Of the six pick-up fields, only Myitkyina South was capable of night operations, and troop carrier C-47s were used to shuttle troops there during the day for ICD aircraft to fly over the Hump at night.

The mobile air transport squadrons were familiar with the Burma airfields and so were selected to fly the operation. Showing unusual flexibility in planning, the 1348th Base Unit quartered incoming troops near airfields, supplied them, monitored the availability of aircraft and crews, divided the troops into planeloads, and kept Chinese units and their materiel intact. Briefings and fuelings were conducted at Myitkyina South, the planes flew to their pickup fields and loaded, and then flew back to Myitkyina South for a final refueling before flying on to China. The 1348th Base Unit control tower performed all air traffic control of aircraft to and from China.

Grubworm lifted 25,009 Chinese troops, 396 Americans, 1,596 draft animals, 42 jeeps and 144 pieces of artillery in 24 days of flying. ICD crews provided 597 of the 1328 sorties of the operation and moved more than 14,000 of the troops involved. Although three C-47s were lost during the operation, ICD had no losses. (Note: 2nd MATS did have a C-46 go missing on a regular India-China mission on 16 December.) When the Japanese offensive shifted to seize the Fourteenth Air Force bases at Suichwan and Kanchow, the 2nd ATS evacuated the bases in a single day on 22 January.

Between March and May 1945, the ICD carried the first American combat troops into China when it redeployed the two American regiments of the MARS Task Force from Burma. In April, 50 C-47s and 30 C-46s of the ICD (Note: The C-47s were those internally based in China.) conducted "Operation Rooster", transporting both divisions of the Chinese 6th Army from Kunming, where they had been delivered by "Grubworm", to Chihkiang in the western Hsiang valley to reinforce the defense of the 14th AF base there. ICD flew 1,648 sorties, delivering 25,136 troops; 2,178 horses; and 1,565 tons of materiel; for a total of 5,523 tons. 369 tons of aviation gasoline was also carried to Chihkiang for 14th AF use

== Operational difficulties ==
=== Building capability ===
The task facing the Tenth Air Force of creating an airlift was daunting at minimum, emphasizing all that the Army Air Forces lacked in April 1942: no units tasked for moving cargo, no experience in organized airlift by the USAAF or its predecessor Air Corps, and no airfields for basing units. In addition, flying in the region was made more difficult by a lack of reliable charts, an absence of radio navigation aids, and a dearth of weather data.

In 1942 Chiang Kai-shek insisted that at least 7,500 tons per month were needed to keep his field divisions in operation, but this figure proved unattainable for the first fifteen months of the India-China airlift. The 7,500 total was first exceeded in August 1943, by which time objectives had been increased to 10,000 tons a month. Ultimately monthly requirements surpassed 50,000 tons.

Slowly, however, an airlift of unprecedented scale began to take shape. Construction of four new bases was begun in 1942, and by 1944 the operation flew from six all-weather airfields in Assam. By July 1945 the air corridor from India began at thirteen airfields strung out along the North-east Indian Railways in the Brahmaputra valley, with seven in Assam, four in the Bengal valley, and two near Calcutta, (Note: The thirteen Hump bases were Chabua (1333rd Base Unit, C-46/C-87), Mohanbari (1332nd BU, C-46), Sookerating (1337th BU, C-46), Jorhat (1330th BU, C-87/C-109), Tezpur (1327th BU, C-87/C-109), Misamari (1328th BU, C-46), Moran (1331st BU, C-46), Kalaikunda (1355th BU, C-46), and Barrackpore (1304th BU, C-54) in India; and Lalmonir Hat (1326th BU, C-46), Shamshernagar (1347th BU, C-87/C-109), Tezgaon (1346th BU, C-54), and Kurmitola (1345th BU, C-54) in Bangladesh.) and terminated at six Chinaside airfields around Kunming. (Note: Yunnanyi (1338th BU), Kunming (1340th BU), Yangkai (1341st BU), Chanyi (1342nd BU), Luliang (1343rd BU), and Loping (1359th BU). As many as ten airfields near Kunming and Chengdu served as China terminals when the B-29 XX Bomber Command was in operation.)

Through July 1944 the flight corridor for the India-China airlift was fifty miles wide with a highly restrictive vertical clearance. As bases expanded and the Low Hump route came into use, the corridor widened to 200 miles (320 km) and 25 charted routes, with a vertical clearance of 10,000–25,000 MSL in the south, permitting highly congested but controlled operations at all hours.

=== Transport shortcomings ===
A critical problem proved to be finding a cargo aircraft capable of carrying heavy payloads at the high altitudes required, and three types were tried before the opening of a low Hump route permitted the use of C-54s: C-47 and variants, C-46, and C-87/C-109.

Initially, the India-China airlift was flown with the Douglas DC-3 and its military versions, the C-47, C-53 and C-39. However, the DC-3 design's fuselage was so high off the ground that loading from most truck beds was difficult, and its narrow door and weak floor could not sustain heavy cargo. Although C-47s had reinforced flooring and a wider door, they still required specialized loading equipment for much of the cargo needed in China and had a limited payload capacity. Also, performance specifications of the Douglas transports were not suited to high-altitude operation with heavy payloads, and could not normally reach an altitude sufficient to clear the mountainous terrain, forcing the planes to attempt a highly dangerous route through the maze-like Himalayan passes.

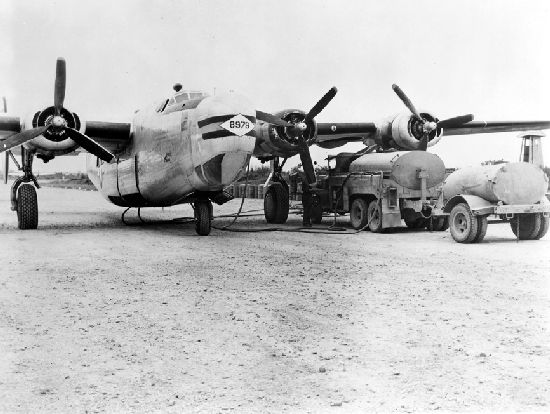
C-109 tanker

The introduction in January 1943 of the Consolidated C-87 Liberator Express, a design modification of the B-24D heavy bomber, boosted tonnage figures. Its high-altitude capability enabled it to surmount the lower mountains (15,000–16000 feet MSL) without resorting to the passes, but the type had a high accident rate and was unsuited to the airfields then in use. Despite having four engines, the C-87 climbed poorly with heavy loads, as did its bomber counterparts, and often crashed on takeoff if an engine failed. Its poor cockpit illumination was inadequate for bad weather flying and often failed during instrument takeoffs, its electrical and hydraulic systems frequently froze at high altitude and malfunctioned, and its flight deck heating system was prone to produce either stifling heat or none at all. Attributed by its pilots to its slim Davis wing, the C-87 also had a tendency to spin out of control when encountering even mild icing conditions over the mountains. One Hump pilot called the variant "an evil, bastard contraption" and a "ground-loving bitch" that "could not carry enough ice to chill a highball".

Despite its shortcomings, the C-87 was valued for the reliability of its engines, speed that enabled it to reduce significantly the effect of head and cross winds, a service ceiling that allowed it to surmount most weather fronts, and range that permitted its crews to fly "pressure-front" patterns that chased favorable winds.

Another Liberator transport variant, the C-109, carried gasoline in converted B-24Js or B-24Ls. All combat equipment was removed and eight flexible bag fuel tanks were installed inside the fuselage with a 2,900 U.S. gallon capacity. 70 were initially planned to fly the Hump with XX Bomber Command, beginning in September 1944, but most of the 218 C-109 conversions eventually served in the CBI under ATC after B-29 operations were shifted from China back to India. At least 80 were involved in major accidents between September 1944 and August 1945. Like the C-87, they were not popular with their crews, (Note: C-109 crews were assigned from surplus B-29 crews of the XX Bomber Command.) since they were very difficult to land when fully loaded, particularly at airfields above 6,000 feet (1,800 m) altitude such as Kunming, and often had unstable flight characteristics when all eight cargo tanks were full. A crash landing of a loaded C-109 inevitably resulted in an explosion and crew fatalities, earning it the nickname "C-One-Oh-Boom".

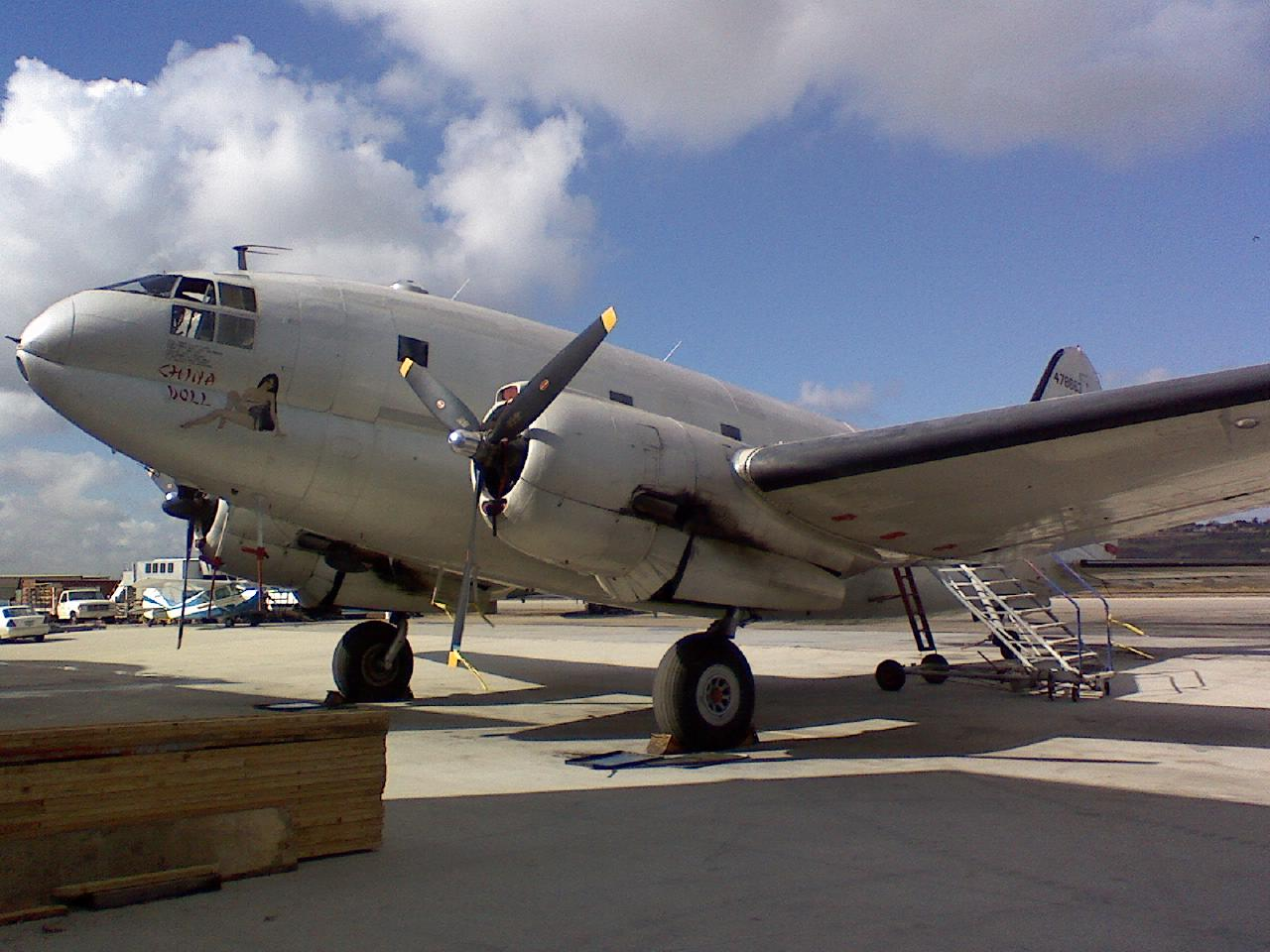
C-46 Commando China Doll

The Curtiss C-46 Commando began to fly India-China missions in May 1943. The C-46 was a large twin-engine aircraft capable of flying faster and higher than any previous medium-range cargo aircraft, and could carry heavier loads than either the C-47 or the C-87, albeit at two and one half times the unit cost of a C-47. With the C-46, airlift tonnage increased significantly, surpassing objectives with 12,594 tons in December 1943. Loads continued to increase throughout 1944 and 1945, reaching an all-time maximum tonnage in July 1945. Performance of the Commando was enhanced when camouflage paint, standard on all USAAF aircraft until February 1944, was removed to reduce weight and provide five extra knots of speed.

While becoming the medium-range workhorse of the Hump airlift, the C-46 throughout its service experienced frequent mechanical failures (in particular, a tendency to engine failure and fuel leaks that puddled at the wing root to become an explosion hazard) that led to such unflattering sobriquets Air Force-wide as "Dumbo" and "Plumber's Nightmare", and among ATC crews as the "flying coffin". In its first five months of operations, 20% of the C-46s assigned to the airlift crashed. When it first arrived in theater, in addition to being accompanied by technical orders that required 50 field modifications before it could be flown operationally, (Note: By November 1943 the number of required field modifications had risen to over 700.) the C-46 also required additional training for inexperienced crews, and a transition school was established that drained the airlift of ten aircraft and crews. Worse, spare parts were in such scarce supply until the fall of 1943 that 26 of the first 68 C-46s sent were out of commission.

=== Flight hazards ===
Flying over the Hump proved to be an extremely hazardous undertaking for Allied flight crews. The air route wound its way into the high mountains and deep gorges between north Burma and west China, where violent turbulence, 125 to 200 mph (320 km/h) winds, icing, and inclement weather conditions were a regular occurrence. Lack of suitable navigational equipment, radio beacons, and inadequate numbers of trained personnel (there were never enough navigators for all the groups) continually affected airlift operations.

In the first year of the airlift, inexperienced officers of the Services of Supply (Note: ATC did not at any time have control of personnel or units responsible for loading.) often ordered planes loaded until they were "about full", ignorant of gross weight limitations or center of gravity placement, while most pilots were reserves recently called up from the airlines with little military transport experience and accustomed to civilian safety standards. As the airlift grew in size and scope in 1943, demands of tactical units and the failure of airline-conducted ATC training programs to produce sufficient multi-engined pilots limited nearly all reinforcement pilots to those just out of flight school or single-engine rated pilots from training fields who had relatively little instrument time. In December 1942, one-third of the 102 technical sergeant (non-commissioned officer) pilot training graduates of the Lubbock Field Class 42-I were immediately sent to India to fly the Hump as replacement co-pilots. This collective inexperience required ICW to create an in-theater OTU near Karachi to qualify new arrivals, taking 16 experienced pilots and eight to ten aircraft away from the airlift. CNAC pilots, while accustomed to a variety of aircraft, also had little instrument experience, and most were unfamiliar with the large American transport aircraft used in the airlift. Not until 1944, when the ATC recruited high hour civilian flight instructors released by the USAAF in pilot training program cutbacks, and the 3rd OTU at Reno Army Air Force Base (Nevada) turned out a growing number of C-46 crews, were highly qualified replacements more readily available for the airlift.

Still, American and CNAC pilots often flew daily on round-trip flights, and around the clock. Some exhausted crews flew as many as three roundtrips every day, particularly during the Hardin rotation policy. Mechanics serviced planes in the open, using tarpaulins to cover the engines during the frequent downpours, and suffered burns to exposed flesh from sun-heated bare metal. There were not enough mechanics or spare parts to go around during the first two years of operations; maintenance and engine overhauls were often deferred. Many overloaded planes crashed on takeoff after mechanical trouble such as an engine failure. Author and ATC pilot Ernest K. Gann recalled flying into Chabua and witnessing four air crashes in one day: two C-47s, two C-87s and 32 killed. He commented with grim sarcasm, "Not to be confused with a combat operation." Due to the isolation of the area, as well as the lower priority of the CBI theater, parts and supplies to keep planes flying were in short supply before the onset of the "Fireball", and flight crews were often sent into the Himalayan foothills to cannibalize aircraft parts from the numerous crash sites. At times, monthly aircraft losses totaled 50% of all aircraft then in service along the route. A byproduct of the numerous air crashes was a local boom in native wares made from aluminum crash debris.

In addition to losses from weather and mechanical failure, the unarmed and unescorted transport aircraft flying the Hump were occasionally attacked by Japanese fighters. While piloting a C-46 on one such mission, Lt. Wally A. Gayda returned fire in desperation against a fighter by pushing a Browning automatic rifle out the cockpit window and firing a full magazine, killing the Japanese pilot. Some C-87 pilots installed a pair of forward-firing .50 caliber machine guns fuselage-mounted in front of the cargo doors of their aircraft, but there is no documented instance of their being used.

=== Search and rescue ===
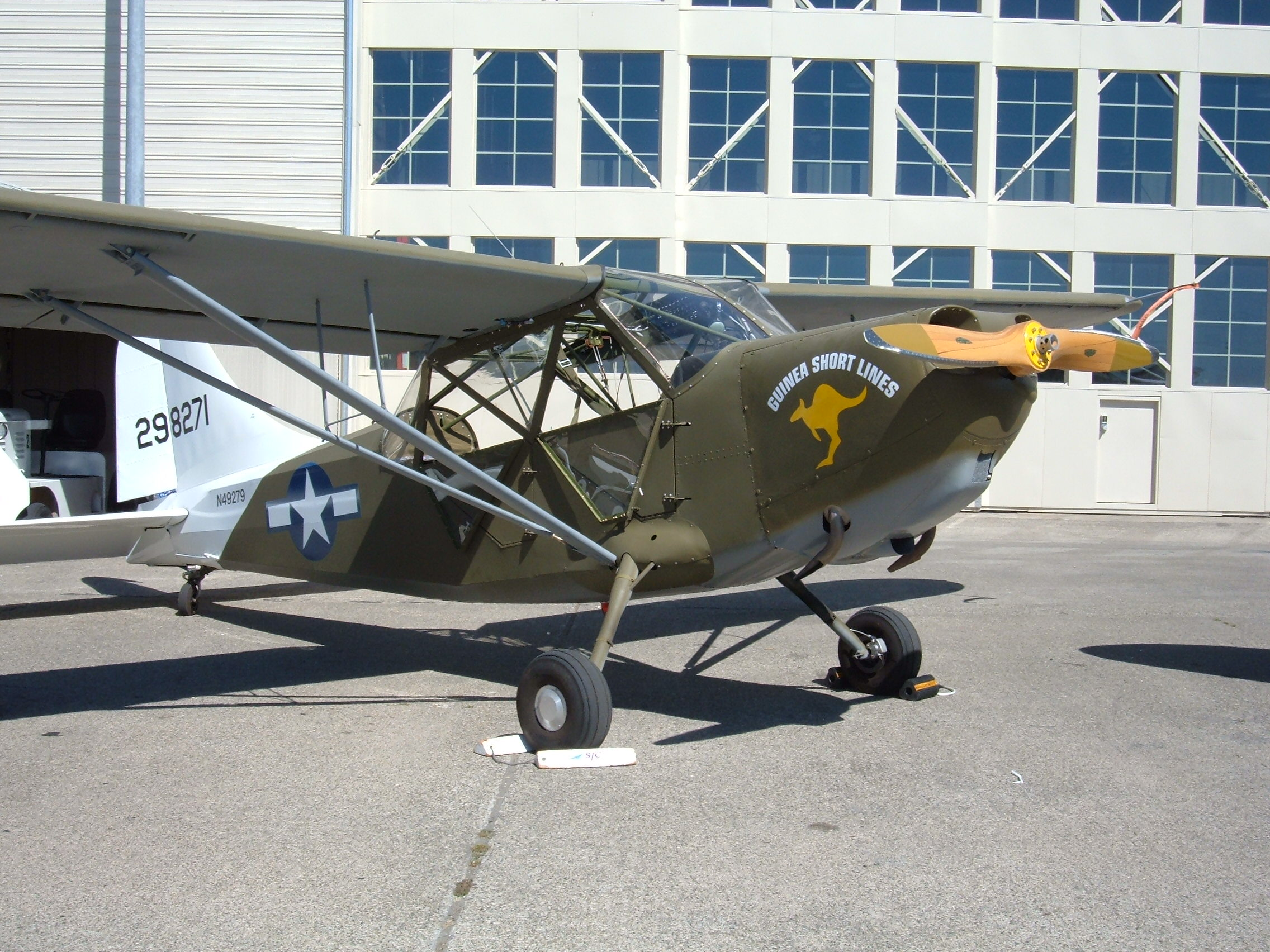
L-5 Sentinel

The high number of losses resulted in the formation at Jorhat in July 1943 of one of the first search and rescue organizations, nicknamed "Blackie's Gang". A former test pilot and a Hump veteran, Capt. John L. "Blackie" Porter directed the unit using C-47s borrowed from airlift units that were crewed by a dozen former barnstormers and enlisted personnel armed with submachine guns and hand grenades. "Blackie's Gang" accounted for virtually every crewman recovered in 1943, including CBS News correspondent Eric Sevareid and 19 others forced to parachute on 2 August. The unit moved to Chabua on 25 October and was given official status and allotted two C-47s and several L-5 Sentinel liaison planes for rescue pickups. Porter recruited volunteer medics to parachute into crash sites to aid injured crewmen. In late November he added two B-25 Mitchells to his small fleet from aircraft that had been consigned to a salvage field. Porter was killed in action on 10 December 1943, when his B-25 was set on fire by Japanese Zero fighters during a search mission and crashed at the Indian border trying to return to base.

When Tunner took command of ICD, he was dissatisfied with the existing search-and-rescue set-up, deeming it "a cowboy operation". He appointed the operations officer at Mohanbari, former Hump pilot Major Donald C. Pricer, to establish "a thoroughgoing and efficient search and rescue organization". Pricer's 90 men of the 1352nd Base Unit (Search and Rescue) at Mohanbari used four B-25s, a C-47, and an L-5, painted yellow overall with blue wing bands for easy identification, to conduct the search missions. Pricer also charted all known crash sites to eliminate checking previous wrecks, and on occasion called upon a Sikorsky YR-4 helicopter based at Myitkyina to assist in rescue missions.

The Hump Express, in its last edition on 15 November 1945, reported:

The unit has been responsible for all search and rescue work from Bhamo, in Burma, north as far as allied planes regularly fly. Roughly, its jurisdiction extended from Tezpur, India to Yunnanyi, China. Before organized search and rescue, crews had been lost for weeks, sometimes months. Stretches up to 90 days were not unknown in a country where jungle thickets and dizzy mountain trails made each hour a nightmare to the lost crews fighting their way out. But today, ICD's unique outfit probably would have made the story a trifle less stark. Aerial supply drops of maps and pertinent homing information would have made the walk-out perhaps less circuitous, while certainly the hardships would have been alleviated by air-dropped medical supplies, food and clothing. S & R members have parachuted to lost aircrews to furnish medical aid and walkout assistance. As a direct result of the unit's work, the percentage of saved personnel steadily mounted and with it the confidence and assurance of ICD flight crews.

== Statistical summary of operations ==
ATC operations accounted for 685,304 gross tons of cargo carried eastbound during hostilities, including 392,362 tons of gasoline and oil, with nearly 60% of that total delivered in 1945. ATC aircraft made 156,977 trips eastbound between 1 December 1943, and 31 August 1945, losing 373 aircraft. Though supplemented by the opening of the Ledo Road network in January 1945 and by the recapture of Rangoon, the airlift's total tonnage of 650,000 net tons dwarfed that of the Ledo Road (147,000 tons). In addition to cargo, 33,400 persons were transported, in one or both directions.

CNAC pilots made a key contribution to India-China flight operations. Between 1942 and 1945, the Chinese received 100 transport aircraft from the United States: 77 C-47s and 23 C-46s. Of the eventual 776,532 gross tons and approximately 650,000 net tons transported over the Hump, CNAC pilots accounted for 75,000 tons (about 12%). The India-China airlift continued beyond the end of the war. The final missions of the ICD, made after most of its attached organizations had departed, were the transporting of 47,000 U.S. personnel west over The Hump from China to Karachi for return to the United States.

The maximum aircraft strength of the India-China Division, ATC (31 July 1945) was 640 aircraft: 230 C-46s, 167 C-47s, 132 C-54s, 67 C-87/C-109s, 33 B-25s, 10 L-5s, and 1 B-24.

Gen. Tunner's final report stated that the airlift "expended" 594 aircraft. (Note: "Expended" includes aircraft destroyed during Japanese air raids and a large number of transports written off ("Class 26 accident") as too expensive or too damaged to warrant repair. Except for those lost to Japanese interceptors, all ATC losses during flight were USAAF Form 14 losses, "other than combat.") At least 468 American and 41 CNAC aircraft were known lost from all causes, with 1,314 air crewmen and passengers killed. In addition, 81 more aircraft were never accounted for, with their 345 personnel listed as missing. Another 1,200 personnel had been rescued or walked back to base on their own.

The final summary of logged flight time in the airlift totalled 1.5 million hours. The India-China ferrying operation was the largest and most extended strategic air bridge (in volume of cargo airlifted) in aviation history until it was surpassed in 1949 by the Berlin airlift, an operation also commanded by Gen. Tunner. Tunner, writing in Over the Hump, described the significance of the India-China Airlift:

Once the airlift got underway, every drop of fuel, every weapon, and every round of ammunition, and 100 percent of such diverse supplies as carbon paper and C rations, every such item used by American forces in China was flown in by airlift. Never in the history of transportation had any community been supplied such a large proportion of its needs by air, even in the heart of civilization over friendly terrain...After the Hump, those of us who had developed an expertise in air transportation knew that we could fly anything anywhere anytime.

From 1942 to 1944, 98 percent of all US lend-lease to China went directly to US Army units in China, not the Chinese military.

== Notable Hump airlift participants ==
Notable people involved in the Hump airlift, and their later careers, included:

- Maj. Gen. Barry Goldwater, Pilot and flight instructor, later US Senator and presidential nominee
- Col. Harry L. "Red" Clark (former Eastern area flight manager for American Airlines and vice president-flight for Seaboard World Airlines), commanding officer 1st Ferrying Group
- Col. Robert L. Scott, Jr., pilot and commanding officer
- Col. Merian C. Cooper (movie producer), liaison officer
- Col. James H. Douglas, Jr. (Secretary of the Air Force), ATC staff member
- Lt. Col. Robert S. McNamara (corporate executive, Secretary of Defense), scheduling analyst for "Reverse Hump" operation
- Lt. Col. Thomas Watson Jr. (corporate executive, CEO of IBM, ambassador to Soviet Union)
- Lt. Col. Reserves Erik Meidell Jr. (Berlin Airlift pilot, as United Airlines pilot flew King Olav V of Norway in his 1969 state visit to the United States), C-46 pilot
- Lt. Col. Lloyd H. Aronson, Pilot. Saved a Chinese girl from pneumonia after his plane was forced to crash-land in western China. (Scott, Col. Robert. God Is My Co-Pilot. Second Special Printing, Ballantine Books, 1976. Page 149.) Later flew the Berlin airlift and worked for NASA.
- Maj. Floyd Shaw "Buckley" Benjamin Jr. (Pilot TE(1051) & 4E(1024) (P); B-24, B-25, C-47, C-54.), 1596th (2nd Foreign Trans Gp) (Ferrying Div, ATC) New Castle Army Air Field, Wilmington, Del.
- Maj. Arthur Chin, Chinese-American fighter ace, one of the original volunteer pilots to join war against Imperial Japan
- Maj. Ernest K. Gann (author), C-87 instructor pilot
- Capt. Jack Narz, C-46 pilot
- Capt. Walter G. Hughen, noted civilian AA commercial pilot recruited as commander in the earliest stages of the operation
- Capt. Larry Clinton (band leader), flight instructor 1343rd Base Unit
- Capt. Richard E. Cole (Doolittle Raider), 6th Ferrying Squadron (1st Ferrying Group) pilot (Note: Cole remained in the CBI as a Hump pilot until 29 April 1943 and was the pilot of the first C-87 mission over the Hump.)
- Lt. Ralph Knudtsen, (CA Steel Industrialist) C-47 pilot, commanding officer, Purple Heart recipient, over 300 missions and shot down in Burma, wound to the head
- Capt. Edgar E. McElroy (Doolittle Raider), C-47 pilot
- Captain Frank Kingdon-Ward (botanist), British soldier recruited to locate crash sites
- Captain Lawrence D. Edmonson (psychologist, later lifetime private pilot until age 88), C-46/C-47 pilot
- Lt. Jerry Disharoon (USAF Colonel), C-46/C-47 pilot
- 2d Lt. Theodore F. Stevens (U.S. senator), C-47/C-46 pilot
- 2d Lt. George Olesen (cartoonist), B-24 pilot 7th Bomb Group
- Lt. Beryl Clark (NFL player), C-109 pilot 1347th Base Unit
- Lt. Bruce Sundlun (Rhode Island governor), C-54 pilot
- F/O. Gene Autry (television and movie star), C-109 pilot
- F/O Vernon Martin (NFL player), C-109 pilot 1347th Base Unit
- T/Sgt. Tony Martin (entertainer), Special Services performer (Note: Martin's role in boosting morale during the final year of the airlift was significant. In his memoirs Tunner called him "a godsend" and noted that in addition to performing, Martin was both talent scout and producer, putting together a touring troupe of amateur entertainers culled from the ranks of ICD personnel.)
- S/Sgt. Leonard Pennario (concert pianist), recruited to Martin's troupe
- Roy Farrell and Sydney de Kantzow (co-founders of Cathay Pacific Airways), CNAC pilots
- David Elvin Nelson (1920–2022), Santa Rosa, California, surviving pilot and last surviving founder of San Francisco Maritime Museum
- LT COL W.E. Yeates, founder member of the Veterans Memorial Museum in Laurel, MS
- Major J.W. Slaton, Captain & initial cadre (1937 hire) at Delta Air Lines

== See also ==
- Fort Hertz covered an airstrip in Northern Burma which served as an emergency landing ground for planes flying the Hump.
- Hengduan Mountains
- South-East Asian Theatre of World War II
- Ledo Road

== General references ==
- Allen, Louis (1984). Burma: The Longest War 1941–45. Dent Paperbacks. pp. 242–244, 390. ISBN 0-460-02474-4.
- Birdsall, Steve (1973). Log of the Liberators: An Illustrated History of the B-24. Garden City: Doubleday and Sons. ISBN 0-385-03870-4.
- Bowen, Dr. Henry Lee (1953). "Part II. Aid to China: The Theater Air Forces in CBI". In Craven, Wesley Frank; Cate, James Lea (eds.). The Army Air Forces in World War II: The Pacific: Matterhorn to Nagasaki June 1944 to August 1945 (PDF). Vol. V. Air Force Historical Studies Office. pp. 200–274.
- Bowman, Martin (1989). B-24 Liberator 1939–45. Norwich. Patrick Stephens, Ltd. ISBN 1-85260-073-X.
- Carter, John D. (1958). "Chapter 1: The Air Transport Command"; and "Chapter 2: Airway to the Middle East". In Craven, Wesley Frank; Cate, James Lea (eds.). The Army Air Forces in World War II: Services Around the World (PDF). Vol. VII. Air Force Historical Studies Office. pp. 3–62.
- Carter, Kit C.; Mueller, Robert (1991). U.S. Army Air Forces in World War II: Combat Chronology 1941–1945 (PDF). Washington D.C.: Center for Air Force History. Archived from the original (PDF) on 2015-01-21.
- Cate, James Lea (1953). "Part I. The Twentieth Air Force and MATTERHORN". In Craven, Wesley Frank; Cate, James Lea (eds.). The Army Air Forces in World War II: The Pacific: Matterhorn to Nagasaki June 1944 to August 1945 (PDF). Vol. V. Air Force Historical Studies Office. pp. 58–178.
- Coffey, Thomas M. (1982). Hap: The Story of the U.S. Air Force and the Man Who Built It General Henry H. 'Hap' Arnold. Viking Press. pp. 291–292. ISBN 0-670-36069-4.
- Correll, John T. (2009). "Over the Hump to China" (PDF). Air Force Magazine. 92 (October): 68–71.
- Daugherty, Leo J. III (Summer 1996). "Supplying War: Interservice and Interallied Cooperation in China-Burma-India" (PDF). Joint Force Quarterly (12). Archived from the original (PDF) on 2013-11-11.
- DeBerry, Col. Drue L. (2002). The Air Force, Andrews AFB. Maryland: Air Force Historical Foundation, Hugh Lauter Levins Associates. p. 49. ISBN 0-88363-104-0.
- Fogerty, Robert P. (1953). "Tunner, William H". Biographical Data on Air Force General Officers, 1917–1952, Volume 2 - L thru Z (PDF). Maxwell Air Force Base: USAF Historical Division. Archived from the original (PDF) on 2012-06-12.
- Gann, Ernest (1961). Fate Is The Hunter. New York: Simon & Schuster.
- Glines, Carroll V. (1991). "Flying the Hump". Air Force Magazine. 74 (March): 102–105.
- Hanson, David S. (2008). "'When You Get a Job to Do, Do It': The Airpower Leadership of Lt. Gen. William H. Tunner" (PDF). U.S. Air Force. Archived (PDF) from the original on June 4, 2011.
- Heck, Frank H. (1958). "Chapter 5: Airline to China". In Craven, Wesley Frank; Cate, James Lea (eds.). The Army Air Forces in World War II: Services Around the World (PDF). Vol. VII. Air Force Historical Studies Office. pp. 114–151.
- Heflin, Dr. Woodrow A (1953). "Chapter 6. Ways and Means". In Craven, Wesley Frank; Cate, James Lea (eds.). The Army Air Forces in World War II: The Pacific: Matterhorn to Nagasaki June 1944 to August 1945 (PDF). Vol. V. Air Force Historical Studies Office. pp. 179–199.
- Launis, Roger D. (2000). "The Hump Airlift Operation". In Scott, Beth F.; Rainey, James C.; Hunt, Andrew W. (eds.). The Logistics of War: A Historical perspective. Air Force Logistics Management Agency (U.S. Air Force). pp. 110–113. ISBN 978-1-4289-9378-5.
- Lewis, W. David (2005). Eddie Rickenbacker: An American Hero in the Twentieth Century. Johns Hopkins University Press. ISBN 0-8018-8244-3.
- Li, Xiangping (2003). Hump Air Transport. China Intercontinental Press. p. 131. ISBN 978-7-5085-0286-1.
- McGowan, Sam (2011). Anything, Anywhere, Anytime: Tactical Airlift in the US Army Air Forces and US Air Force From World War II to Vietnam. AuthorHouse (e-book). ISBN 978-1-4685-0564-1.
- Nalty, Bernard C. (1997). "Victory over Japan". In Bernard, C. Nalty (ed.). Winged Shield, Winged Sword: A History of the United States Air Force. Air University Press. p. 342. ISBN 0-16-049009-X.
- Okerstrom, Dennis K. (2015). Dick Cole's War: Doolittle Raider, Hump Pilot, Air Commando. University of Missouri Press. ISBN 978-0-8262-2066-0.
- Plating, John D. (2011). The Hump: America's Strategy for Keeping China in World War II. College Station: Texas A&M University Press. p. 320. ISBN 978-1-6034-4237-4..
- Romanus, Charles F.; Sunderland, Riley (1953). Time Runs Out in CBI (PDF). Center for Military History (US Army). CMH Publication 9-1
- Sherry, Mark D. (3 October 2003). "US Army Campaigns of World War II: China Defensive Campaign, 4 July 1942-4 May 1945". United States Army Center of Military History. pp. 1–26. Archived from the original on 1 April 2019.
- Slim, Field Marshal William (1956). "Chapter IX: The Foundations". Defeat Into Victory. London: Cassell.
- Tunner, Lt. Gen. William H. (1955). Over the Hump (PDF). Air Force Historical Studies Office.
- Taylor, Dr. Joe G. (1957). USAF Historical Study 75: Air Supply in the Burma Campaign (PDF). Air Force Historical Research Agency. Archived from the original (PDF) on 2013-11-13.
- Vinyard, J. V., ed. (January 1, 2005). "Flying the Hump (A Fact Sheet for the Hump Operations During World War II)". CBI Hump Pilots Association.
- Weaver, Herbert; Bowen, Lee (1950). Frank Craven, Wesley; Lea Cate, James (eds.). "Section IV. China-Burma-India" (PDF). The Army Air Forces in World War II: The Pacific: Guadalcanal to Saipan: August 1942 – July 1944. Air Force Historical Studies Office. pp. 405–459. Archived from the original (PDF) on 23 November 2016.
- Weaver, Herbert; Rapp, Marvin A. (1944). "Army Air Forces Historical Study 12: The Tenth Air Force 1942" (PDF). Air Force Historical Research Agency. Archived from the original (PDF) on 2009-09-20.
- Weaver, Herbert (1946). USAF Historical Study 117: The Tenth Air Force, 1943 (PDF). Air Force Historical Research Agency. Archived from the original (PDF) on 2013-03-13.
- Weaver, Herbert (1947). Frank Craven, Wesley; Lea Cate, James (eds.). "Chapter 14: Commitments to China" (PDF). The Army Air Forces in World War II: Plans and Early Operations January 1939 to August 1942. Air Force Historical Studies Office. pp. 484–513. Archived from the original (PDF) on 28 January 2016.
- United States. Army Air Forces. Office of Statistical Control (1945). "Army Air Forces Statistical Digest, World War II. Table 211 - ATC Operations From Assam, India to China (Over the Hump): Jan 1943 to Aug 1945" (PDF). U.S. Air Force. Archived from the original (PDF) on 4 March 2016.

=== Websites ===
- American Aircraft of World War Two (28 April 2006). "Curtiss Commando". century-of-flight.net. Archived from the original on 19 August 2009.
- Baugher, Joe (August 15, 1999). "Consolidated C-109". private site. Archived from the original on March 4, 2009. (retrieved with the Wayback archive)
- Goebel, Greg (January 1, 2002). "Curtiss C-46 Commando". private web site.
- Goldblatt, Gary, ed. (September 4, 2010). "2nd Air Transport Squadron (Mobile)". CBI Order of Battle Lineages and History. cbi-history.com.
- Goldblatt, Gary, ed. (June 10, 2011). "Transport Units". CBI Order of Battle Lineages and History. cbi-history.com.
- Kline, David R. (2007). "The Wartime Years of Dayne Kline". archived from the Benton News (Benton, Pennsylvania). Archived from the original on December 29, 2011.
- Leeuw, Ruud (1 November 2008). "Background Information / Curtiss C-46 Commando". private site. credits:

=== Contemporary newspapers ===
- Staff (January 25, 1945). "Hump's Worst Weather Bats Planes About". Hump Express.
- Staff (February 15, 1945). "Flout Enemy to Evacuate Suichwan". Hump Express.
- Staff (February 23, 1945). "'Sylvester's Circus' Makes Records In Three Theaters". China Command Post.
- Staff (March 15, 1945). "Flying Safety Officers launch Intensified Drive". Hump Express.
- Staff (April 12, 1945). "Trojan Run Takes C-54 Over Hump Twice Gaily". Hump Express.
- Staff (November 15, 1945). "Lawrence new CG". Hump Express, final edition.
- Staff (November 15, 1945). "Blackie's Gang' Instills Confidence in Air Crews". Hump Express, final edition.
