= Waterfront Air =

Chinese airline

Waterfront Air 海翔航空
IATA	ICAO	Call sign
—	—	—
- Founded: 20 October 2008
- Ceased operations: 2014
- Destinations: 4 proposed
- Headquarters: Shenzhen and Hong Kong
- Key people: Michael Agopsowicz (Founder); Peter de Kantzow (Co-founder); Bert Kwok (Chairman)

Waterfront Air (Chinese: 海翔航空; Jyutping: hoi2 coeng4 hong4 hung1) is a Chinese airline started in 2008 with the aim of reintroducing seaplane services from Hong Kong's Victoria Harbour. In 2014 the airline ended plans for operating in Hong Kong and instead is focusing its operations in mainland China.

== History ==
Waterfront Air was founded by Michael Agopsowicz and co-founded by Peter de Kantzow, who is the son of Sydney de Kantzow, the Australian co-founder of Cathay Pacific Airways.

Six years after the company began, Waterfront Air HK ceased operations on 23 December 2014 without any established routes, according to Hong Kong's Companies Registry record.

As of 2015, HaiXiang Air (海翔公務航空有限公司) intended to operate seaplane services in China under the English name Waterfront Air. HaiXiang Air received their AOC preliminary approval in China on 10 August 2015 from the CAAC South Central branch.

== Proposed routes ==
HaiXiang Air operating as Waterfront Air has planned routes between Hong Kong and Macau and Shenzhen, with an estimated flight time of 20 minutes. There are additional plans to extend the services to Guangzhou and other parts of Shenzhen in the near future.

Waterfront Air's proposed destinations includedGuangzhou, Shenzhen, Hong Kong and Macau.

== Fleet ==
Waterfront Air plans to lease de Havilland DHC-6 Twin Otters, but no aircraft appeared to have been ordered or delivered.

== Facilities ==
The airline had planned to use the old Kai Tak Airport adjacent to the Kai Tak Cruise Terminal in Victoria Harbour for operations in Hong Kong.

== Progress ==
In February 2010, the airline reached an agreement with Shenzhen Airport Group to make Shenzhen the company's main base. On 6 January 2010, Waterfront Air signed a memorandum of understanding with the Shenzhen Airport Ferry Terminal Services Company Limited to operate seaplane services from Shenzhen Airport Ferry Pier to various destinations in the Greater Pearl River Delta.

On 1 April 2013, Waterfront Air concluded an agreement with the Shenzhen Dapeng Peninsula government to operate seaplane services from Nan'Ao.

In July, 2015, Viking Air announced the certification of the Twin Otter in China.

On 10 August 2015, HaiXiang Air received their AOC preliminary approval in China from the CAAC South Central branch.
