= Sydney de Kantzow =

Australian co-founder of Cathay Pacific

Sydney Hugh de Kantzow
- Born: 9 November 1914; Austinmer, New South Wales, Australia
- Died: 21 November 1957 (aged 43); Darlinghurst, New South Wales, Australia
- Known for: Co-founder Cathay Pacific
- Spouse: Angela Mary
- Awards
- Aviation career
- First flight: 1934
- Air force: No. 24 Squadron RAF; CNAC (1940–1945)

Sydney Hugh ("Syd") de Kantzow (9 November 1914 – 21 November 1957) was the Australian co-founder of Cathay Pacific Airways with American Roy Farrell.

De Kantzow, the son of Charles Adolphus de Kantzow, was born to a family of Polish and Swedish origin, and grew up in the Sydney suburb of Roseville, New South Wales. He served during World War II as a pilot for the Royal Australian Air Force. Both de Kantzow and Farrell were ex-air force pilots who had flown The Hump, a route over the Himalayan Mountains. It was said that Soong Mei-ling always asked for him personally as her pilot. He was awarded the Order of the Cloud and Banner personally by her for his services with CNAC and the Burma Star for his services in respect to the relief aid program.

Although initially based in Shanghai, the two men moved to Hong Kong to found Cathay Pacific Airways. They named it "Cathay" because that was the medieval name given to China derived from "Khitan", and "Pacific" because Farrell speculated that they would one day fly across the Pacific. The Chinese name for the company comes from a Chinese idiom meaning "Grand and Peaceful State".

As the business developed, Farrell focused more on the shipping aspects of the company and de Kantzow focused more on flying the aircraft. The early Cathay Pacific pilots were referred to as "Syd's Pirates".

De Kantzow resigned from Cathay Pacific in 1951 and died in a high-speed car accident in 1957. He and his wife Angela Mary (1924 – 2005) had son Peter, a director and co-founder of Waterfront Air of Hong Kong.
