= Earl S. Hoag =

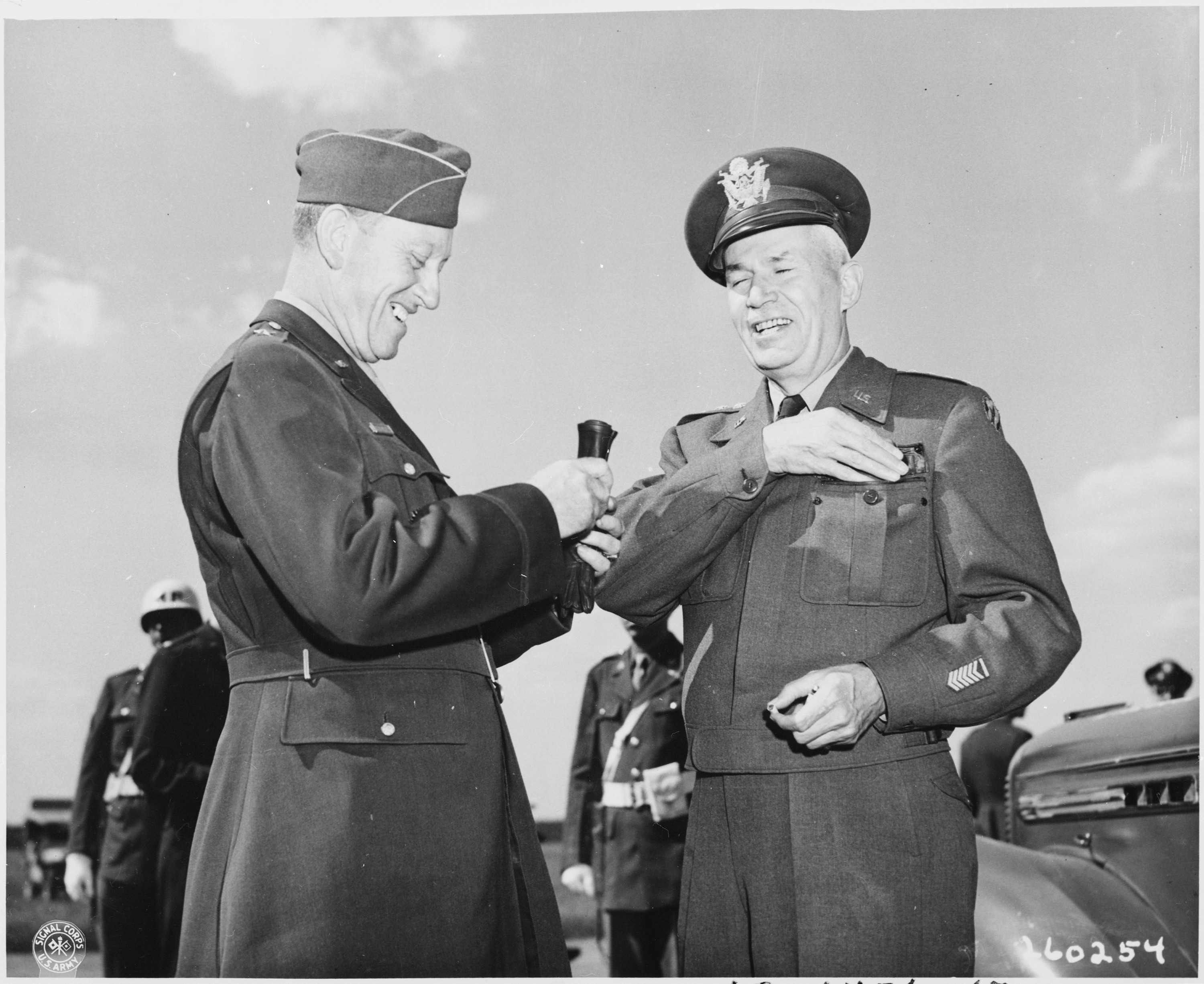
Earl S. Hoag (left) with Gen. Brehon Somervell, 15 July 1945

Earl Seeley Hoag (1895–1968) was an American World War II major general.

== Biography ==
In October 1943, he became commanding general of the India-China Wing of Air Transport Command, which operated supply and sustainment flights over "The Hump" between India and China. In March 1944 he was designated commanding general of the European Division of Air Transport Command which he reorganized in preparation for the invasion of Normandy. He remained in that post until the end of World War II, then served in various other posts until his retirement in 1953.

== Awards and decorations ==
General Hoag has been awarded the Distinguished Service Medal, Legion of Merit, Air Medal, and the Army Commendation Medal. His foreign decorations include the British Honorary Companion, Most Excellent Order of the Bath; the Norwegian Order of St. Olav, Commander with Star; the Chinese Special Collar Order of Yun-Hui, and the French Legion of Honor, Chevalier, and Croix de Guerre with Palm.
