= 3rd Airlift Squadron =

3rd Airlift Squadron

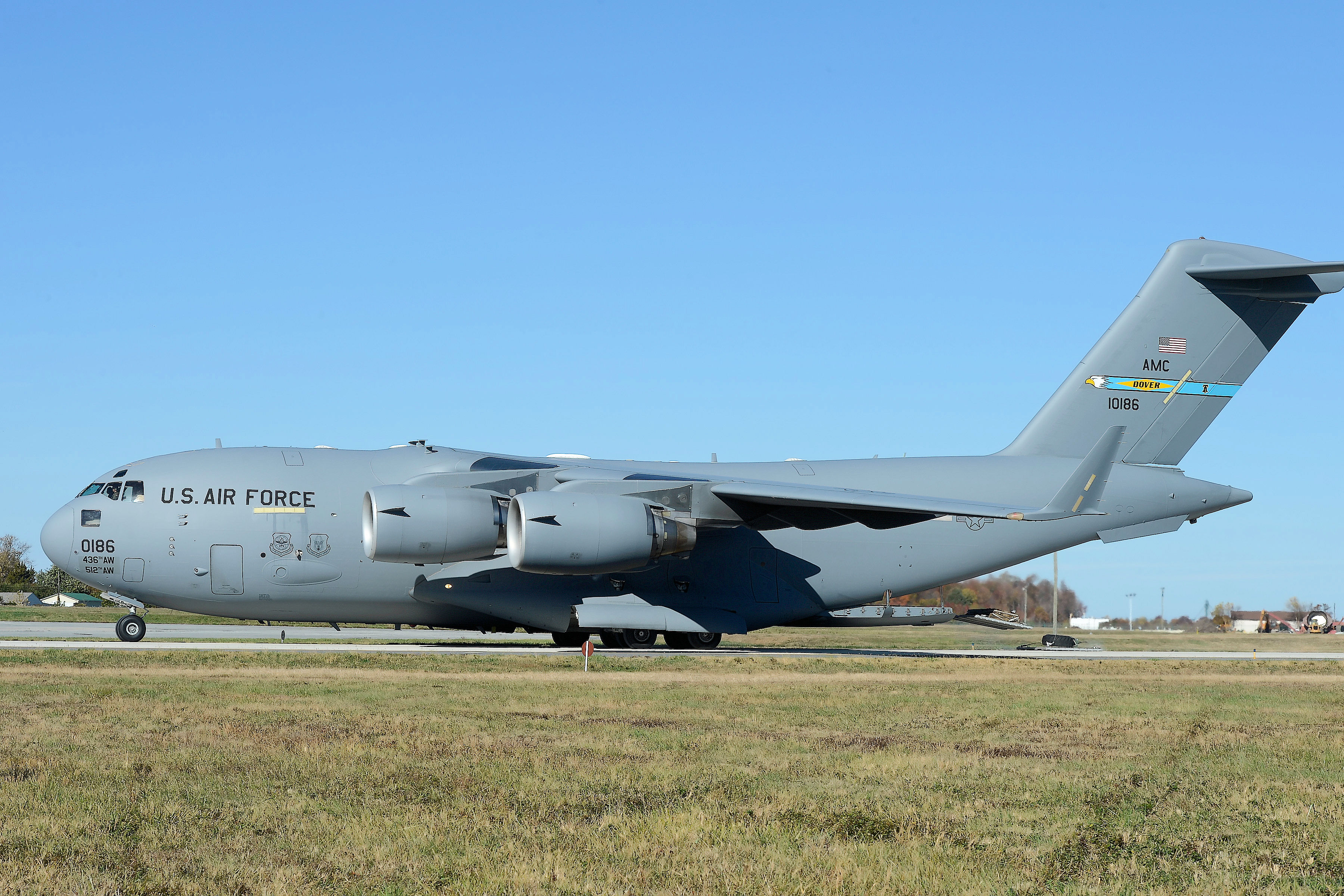
- 3rd Airlift Squadron C-17A Globemaster III (Note: Aircraft is Boeing C-17A Globemaster III, serial 01-186.)
- Active: 1942–1943; 1952–present
- Country: United States
- Branch: United States Air Force
- Role: Airlift
- Part of: Air Mobility Command
- Garrison/HQ: Dover Air Force Base, Delaware
- Mottos: Safe, Swift, Sure; Third but First
- Engagements: Asia-Pacific Theater (World War II) Southwest Asia Service: Defense of Saudi Arabia; Liberation and Defense of Kuwait
- Decorations: Air Force Outstanding Unit Award; Republic of Vietnam Gallantry Cross with Palm

Commanders
- Current commander: Lieutenant Colonel Zane Hershey
- Notable commanders: William J. Begert

Insignia
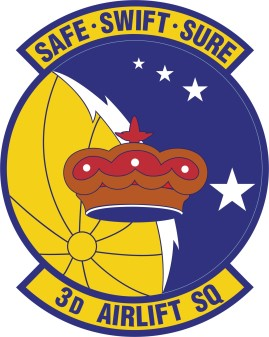
- 3rd Airlift Squadron emblem (Note: Approved 31 July 1959. Description: On a Blue disc bordered Blue, a Golden Yellow sun issuing from dexter (right), radials Blue, the perimeter surrounde by a White lightning flash arched, in chief three small White stars forming "Orion's belt", in sinister (left) one (1) large White star "Sirius", over all a Golden crown trimmed Red, lined Blue with highlights White, outlined and details White.)

The 3rd Airlift Squadron is an active unit of the United States Air Force, assigned to the 436th Airlift Wing, Air Mobility Command. It is based at Dover Air Force Base near Dover, Delaware. The squadron operates Boeing C-17 Globemaster III aircraft supporting the United States Air Force global reach mission worldwide.

== History ==
=== World War II ===
The squadron goes back to the days of World War II when it was activated at Pope Field, North Carolina, in March 1942, as the 3rd Air Corps Ferrying Squadron. Two months later, the 3rd moved to India, where it was stationed at Chabua Airfield, Upper Assam, India. It was part of the India-China Wing of Air Transport Command and carried supplies and equipment back and forth across The Hump. The squadron was disbanded in late 1943.

=== Strategic airlift ===
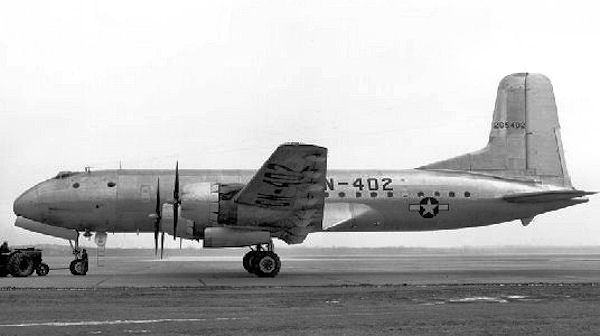
Squadron C-74 Globemaster in the early 1950s (Note: Aircraft is Douglas C-74 Globemaster, serial 42–65402.)

During the Korean War, the 3rd was reconstituted at Brookley Air Force Base, Alabama as the 3rd Air Transport Squadron, and began flying regularly scheduled airlift missions in its eight Douglas C-124 Globemaster IIs to the Arctic, Caribbean, and South America. In June 1958, the squadron moved to Charleston Air Force Base, South Carolina, where it continued to fly C-124s until August 1965, when it transitioned into jets with the arrival of the first Lockheed C-141 Starlifter. Redesignated the 3rd Military Airlift Squadron on 8 Jan 1966.

In June 1970, the squadron, now the 3rd Military Airlift Squadron received the first operational Lockheed C-5 Galaxy to be assigned to a Military Airlift Command (MAC) flying organization. Three years later, the 3rd moved to its present home with the 436th Airlift Wing at Dover Air Force Base. Aircrews of the 3rd flew support missions for French troops in the Zaire peacekeeping effort. For their efforts, they were co-recipients with a 9th Military Airlift Squadron crew of the Mackay Trophy for the 1978 airlift operation. The 3rd proved itself and the C-5 by setting MAC records for departure reliability. In 1986, the 3rd received the 436th Military Airlift Wing's Flying Eagle award four times for having the highest percentage of on-time departures in the wing.

In April 1988, a 3rd crew, overcoming the difficulties of flying into unfamiliar territory, airlifted drilling equipment into Semipalatinsk, in the Soviet Union. The mission was part of a joint nuclear weapons detonation monitoring agreement signed by the United States and the Soviet Union. The crew was subsequently awarded the Mackay Trophy for the "most meritorious flight of the year". Redesignated the 3rd Airlift Squadron on 1 Dec 1991.

The 3rd continues its distinct history and support of Air Mobility Command (AMC) by flying humanitarian and contingency missions into such places as Southwest Asia, Somalia, Rwanda, and Haiti. The squadron participated in the first-ever six-ship formation flights of C-5's in support of the Strategic Brigade Airdrop Test. In October 2003 a crew from the 3rd Airlift Squadron landed the first Galaxy in Iraq at Baghdad International Airport. Until 2004 the unit was also the only Special Operations Low Level capable unit to fly the C-5 Galaxy.

In March 2007 the squadron transitioned from operation of the C-5 to the newer Boeing C-17 Globemaster III. The squadron was awarded the General Joseph Smith Trophy for 2009 when they were judged to be the best airlift squadron in AMC.

September 2017, saw the 3rd deploy to Puerto Rico and the U.S. Virgin Islands to deliver much needed humanitarian supplies to the islands following the devastating Hurricanes Irma and Maria.

During September 2019, the squadron took part in Exercise Mobility Guardian 2019. Exercise Mobility Guardian is Air Mobility Command's premier, large-scale mobility exercise that took place that year at Fairchild Air Force Base, Washington.

== Lineage ==
- Constituted as the 3rd Air Corps Ferrying Squadron on 18 February 1942

Activated on 7 March 1942
Redesignated 3rd Transport Squadron on 24 March 1943
Disbanded on 1 December 1943

- Reconstituted and redesignated 3rd Air Transport Squadron, Heavy on 20 June 1952

Activated on 20 July 1952
Redesignated 3rd Military Airlift Squadron on 8 January 1966
Redesignated 3rd Airlift Squadron on 1 December 1991

=== Assignments ===
- 1st Ferrying Group (later 1st Transport Group), 7 March 1942 – 1 December 1943
- 1703rd Air Transport Group, 20 July 1952
- 1700th Air Transport Group, 18 June 1957
- 1608th Air Transport Wing, 24 November 1957
- 1608th Air Transport Group, 18 June 1958
- 1608th Air Transport Wing, 18 January 1963
- 437th Military Airlift Wing, 8 January 1966
- 436th Military Airlift Wing, 1 August 1973
- 436th Operations Group, 1 December 1991 – present

=== Stations ===
- Pope Field, North Carolina, 7 March 1942
- Charleston Army Air Base, South Carolina, 17–19 March 1942
- Karachi Airport, India, 15 May 1942
- New Malir Cantonment, India, 17 May 1942
- Chabua Airfield, India, 1 August 1942 – 1 December 1943
- Brookley Air Force Base, Alabama, 20 July 1952
- Charleston Air Force Base, South Carolina, 18 June 1958
- Dover Air Force Base, Delaware, 1 August 1973 – present

=== Aircraft ===
- Curtiss C-46 Commando, 1942–1943
- Douglas C-74 Globemaster, 1948–1955
- Douglas C-124 Globemaster II, 1952–1965
- Lockheed C-141 Starlifter, 1965–1970
- Lockheed C-5 Galaxy, 1970–2007
- Boeing C-17 Globemaster III, 2007–present

=== Decorations ===
Air Force Outstanding Unit Awards: 1 Jan 1963-1 Feb 1964; 11 Jul 1966-10 Jul 1967; 11 Jul 1967-10 Jul 1968; 11 Jul 1968-12 Jun 1969; 13 Jun 1969-12 Jun 1970; 1 Jul 1972-30 Jun 1973; 13 Oct-14 Nov 1973; 1 Jan 1974-30 Apr 1975; 1 May 1975-31 May 1976; 1 Jun 1976-31 May 1978; 1 Jun 1978-31 May 1979; 1 Jun 1981-31 May 1982; 1 Jun 1982-31 May 1984.

Republic of Vietnam Gallantry Cross with Palm: 1 Apr 1966-28 Jan 1970.
