= India–China Division, Air Transport Command =

India-China Division
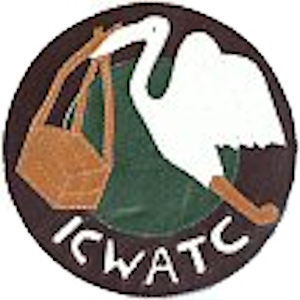
- Active: 1942–1946
- Country: United States
- Branch: United States Army Air Forces
- Role: Air transport
- Engagements: India-China airlift ("The Hump")
- Decorations: Presidential Unit Citation

Commanders
- Notable commanders: William H. Tunner

The India-China Division (ICD) is an inactive United States Air Force unit. Its last assignment was with the Air Transport Command, stationed at Dum Dum Airport Calcutta, British India. It was deactivated in 1946. The organization was formed as the India-China Wing, ATC (ICWATC) from a consolidation of equipment and personnel of former units of the disbanded India-China Ferry Command in December 1942, which had been established in July 1942 by the Tenth Air Force to transport materiel to China over the Himalayan Mountains ("The Hump").

ICWATC was one of nine overseas transport wings of ATC's Air Transportation Division, reporting directly to Division headquarters and not subject to control by theater commanders. It was also one of the few ATC wings to have its own assigned aircraft under the direct command of the wing commander. In July 1944 ATC reorganized worldwide and the nine wings became divisions. ICWATC became the India-China Division, with its Eastern and Western Sectors redesignated the Assam and India Wings respectively. Its mission was the air transport of supplies, personnel, equipment and aircraft within India and China during World War II.

Between 1 December 1942 and 1 December 1943 its flying components were transport groups and squadrons. After that ATC discarded the standard TO&E group/squadron structure for its units and adopted a more flexible "exact manning" system, identifying its units by their station number designation until August 1944, when it converted to the service-wide Army Air Force Base Unit system of designating non-combat units.

The organization began with two stations (Dinjan and Chabua) and three others under construction, operating less than 60 aircraft. By August 1945 ICD had expanded to more than 60 Base Units, 640 aircraft, and 34,000 personnel. On 29 January 1944 the ICWATC became the first non-combat organization to be awarded the Presidential Unit Citation, at the personal direction of President Franklin Delano Roosevelt, for its efforts flying the Hump.

== History ==
=== Lineage ===
- Constituted as the India-China Wing, Air Transport Command

Activated on 1 December 1942 (Note: The wing assumed the personnel and equipment of Tenth Air Force Trans-India Ferry Command, which was discontinued.)
Redesignated India-China Division, Air Transport Command on 1 July 1944 (Note: On 1 August 1944, Headquarters and Headquarters Squadron, India-China Division, Air Transport Command was disbanded and replaced by the 1300th AAF Base Unit (Headquarters, India-China Division, Air Transport Command))
Inactivated on 15 February 1946

=== Assignments ===
- Air Transport Command, 1 December 1942 – 1946

=== Components ===
1 December 1942 to 1 December 1943

- 1st Ferrying Group

3d Ferrying Squadron
6th Ferrying Squadron
13th Ferrying Squadron
Dinjan Airfield, Assam, India

- 22d Transport Group

77th Transport Squadron
78th Transport Squadron
88th Transport Squadron
Jorhat Airfield, Assam, India

- 28th Transport Group

96th Transport Squadron
97th Transport Squadron
98th Transport Squadron
Tezpur Airfield, Assam, India

- 29th Transport Group

13th Ferrying Squadron
99th Transport Squadron
100th Transport Squadron
301st Transport Squadron
Sookerating Airfield, Assam, India

- 30th Transport Group

302nd Transport Squadron
303d Transport Squadron
304th Transport Squadron
Mohanbari Airfield, Assam, India

=== Stations ===
ATC Station Number	AAF Base Unit	Name	Coordinates	Notes
1	1300th	HQ, India-China Division, ATC; Hastings AAB; Rishra, India	22°43′30″N 088°21′18″E	HQ Moved from New Delhi in April 1944 to be closer to operational areas. Co-located with Headquarters Army Air Forces India-Burma Theater in the Hastings Jute Mill. Inactivated 15 February 1946.
19	1305th	Dum Dum Airport; Calcutta, India	22°39′17″N 088°26′48″E	Operated Calcutta (later Bengal) Air Depot. Responsible for movement of aircraft, supplies and equipment received at Calcutta port facilities north to Chauba for points in China or east to forces in Burma. Supported depot facilities operated by Air Materiel Command and Air Technical Service Command in Calcutta. Inactivated 14 December 1945.
2	1325th	HQ, Assam Wing; Chabua Airfield, India	27°27′44″N 095°07′05″E	Established 1944 from Eastern Sector, India-China Wing. Commanded ATC medium-range transport organizations stationed in the Northeast India Assam Valley. Primary mission was ferrying aircraft and moving supplies and equipment over Himalayan Mountains (The Hump). Inactivated 15 October 1945
3	1325th	HQ, Bengal Wing; Tejgaon Airport, India	23°46′43″N 090°22′57″E	Located near Dacca and established December 1944. Commanded ATC C-54 organizations stationed in eastern India and Burma. Also moving supplies and equipment over Himalayan Mountains from Burma. Inactivated 15 June 1946
8	1307th	Hq, India Wing; Willingdon Airfield; New Delhi, India	28°35′04″N 077°12′21″E	Established 1944 from Western Sector, India-China Wing and responsible for ATC operations within most of India. Successor of 10th AF Trans-India Ferry Command. Moved supplies and equipment from Bombay, Bangalore and Ceylon, including operation of Trans-Indian Ferry route from Karachi to Bengal or Assam Wings. Inactivated 5 December 1945
13	1340th	Hq, China Wing; Kunming Airport, China	24°59′32″N 102°44′36″E	Established December 1944 to commanded ATC organizations stationed in China. On route Easy Inactivated 25 November 1945
		RAF Agartala, India	23°53′24″N 091°14′32″E	ATC staging airfield on Transport Route "Nan" (Barrackpore, India Eastbound to Szemao, China). Primarily 10th AF Combat Cargo support airfield for support of British and United States forces in Burma. Also used by 10th AF and RAF. USAAF ended operations June 1945. Now Agartala Airport, India (IATA: IXA, ICAO: VEAT).
17	1303d	Agra Airfield, India	27°09′27″N 077°57′39″E	Built by USAAF, First American personnel arrived 19 March 1942. On Trans-India ferrying route from Karachi to Calcutta. Major ATSC Depot and ATC transshipment facility. ATSC Central Indian Air Depot, 3d Air Depot Group. ATC ended operations December 1945, USAAF May 1946. Today Agra is an Indian Air Force airbase Agra Air Force Station as well as public/civil airport. (IATA: AGR, ICAO: VIAG).
	1304th	Barrackpore Airfield, India	22°46′55″N 088°21′33″E	Airfield established by RAF in June 1943, taken over by USAAF in October. Became transshipment and major Air Depot for ATC transport and ferrying operations to China, Origin of Transport Route "Nan" (Barrackpore Eastbound to Szemao, China), and terminus of Transport Route "Oboe" (Kunming China Westbound to Barrackpore). Also supported 10th AF Combat Cargo operations into Burma for support of British and United States ground forces. USAAF operations ended March 1946. Now IAF Barrackpore Air Force Station.
		Bhamo Airfield, Burma	24°16′06″N 097°14′54″E	Built by Japanese, sized in January 1945 by British forces during the Battle of Bhamo. Became 10th Air Force airfield. Used by ATC as staging airfield on Transport Route "Oboe" (Kunming China westbound to Barrackpore, India), primarily for Combat Cargo resupply and casualty transport. Closed December 1945 Now civil airport (IATA: BMO, ICAO: VYBM).
6	1333d	Chabua Airfield, India	27°27′44″N 095°07′05″E	Built at Hazelbank Tea Plantation by USAAF. Construction began April 1942, opened in September. Was major staging station on ATC Transport Route "Able" (Rupsi, India to Hsichang, China and return) and was one of the most important air transport bases in northeast Assam. A large percentage of the Hump flights originated at Chabua: it was the receiving point for high-priority items air-shipped to the Assam area for use by air and ground forces in CBI, and was the home base for a group of 10th AF B-24 bombers, with supporting fighter planes. Its only runway was 6,000 feet long. Also used by 10th AF Combat Cargo units. Attacked by Japanese aircraft on 12 February 1943. Inactivated 25 December 1945. Now IAF Chabua Air Force Station.
30	1342d	Chanyi Airfield, China	25°35′32″N 103°49′43″E	Primarily 14th AF combat reconnaissance and medium bomber base. Origin of ATC Transport Route "Charlie", (westbound to Tezpur, India) Supported 14th AF Combat Cargo units. Extensive Chinese Army transport facility. USAAF closed facilities 12 October 1945. Now Zhanyi Airport/Air Base civil airport/PLA-AF base (Closed).
15	1339th	Chengkung Airfield, China	25°50′36″N 102°47′57″E	Construction of the airfield began in November 1942, with the airfield opening on 27 January 1943. Chengkung was a major terminal for "the Hump" trans-Himalayan transport aircraft between India and China for Air Transport Command C-47 Skytrain and C-46 Commando aircraft. On Transport Route "Nan" (eastbound from Barrackpore, India) In addition, Air Technical Service Command maintained a maintenance and supply facility at the base to support the airlift operations over the Himalayas. Also 14th AF Combat Cargo Facility. Inactivated 20 October 1945.
		Comilla Airfield, India	23°26′14″N 091°11′22″E	Used by ATC as an axillary field for Dacca on southern transport route through Burma to China. Now Comilla Airport, Bangladesh (IATA: CLA, ICAO: VGCM).
22	1329th	Deragon Airfield, India	26°42′N 093°59′E	Dergaon airfield was located just a few miles west of Jorhat, and was another base for transport flights to China via the "Hump" route. Today, it has disappeared. [not to be confused with Deragon, Central Provinces, India, located near Nagpur] Inactivated on 18 July 1945 Location approximate, obliterated.
		Dinjan Airfield, India	27°32′16″N 095°16′10″E	Primarily used by 10th Air Force. Was an axillary for Chabua on the route to China on Route Able. With the end of combat in September 1945, Dinjan Airfield was abandoned. Today the runways of the former airfield can still be seen from aerial photography, however the base is overrun with vegetation and the land has returned to its natural state.
		Fenny Airfield, India	23°02′06″N 091°23′37″E	On Nan Route. Was primary home of 10th AF 12th Bombardment Group, which flew B-25 Mitchell medium bombers from the airfield. In addition to the bombers, the 12th Combat Cargo Squadron used Fenny to air drop supplies and ammunition to the ground forces. Fenny also was used as a communications station as well as an Air Technical Service Command maintenance depot.
26		Fort Hertz Airfield, Burma	27°19′48″N 097°25′35″E	British station in Burma. Airfield served as an emergency landing ground for planes flying The Hump from India to China over the eastern end of the Himalayas. This same airstrip was the only supply line for Fort Hertz. There was also eventually a radio beacon navigation check point at the site. Also home of US 1st Commando Group. Now Putao Airport (IATA: PBU, ICAO: VYPT).
20	1311th	Gaya Airfield, India	24°44′40″N 084°57′04″E	In east-central India used as a refueling stop on the Trans-India Ferry Route. Also 8th Operational Training Unit. Inactivated on 5 December 1945 Now Gaya Airport (IATA: GAY, ICAO: VEGY)
23	1334th	Golaghat Airfield, India	26°29′17″N 093°59′24″E	Location approximate. In Assam Valley used by ATC as an axillary for Chabua on Transport Route Easy. Inactivated on 7 March 1945 Obliterated today, no remains.
27	1309th	HAL Airport; Bangalore, India	12°57′00″N 077°40′06″E	Primarily used by Air Technical Service Command as an overhaul, depot-level maintenance facility due to large concentration of Indian aircraft companies in area. ATC facility supported logistically with equipment and supplies. Inactivated on 15 October 1945
		Hsinching Airfield, China	30°25′13″N 103°50′41″E	First constructed in 1928, and upgraded during World War II, first in 1940 and then in 1943. Primarily used XX Bomber Command and 14th Air Force as a combat airfield. Used by ATC as a hub on routes Able and Roger. Today Xinjin Airport.
		Indainggale Airfield, Burma	23°11′19″N 094°03′06″E	Seized from Japanese in December 1944. Used as a Supply and Evacuation airfield by ATC and as a hub on Route Nan on southern route over Himalayas to China. Closed October 1945. Now Kalaymyo Airport (IATA: KMV, ICAO: VYKL)
		Ipin Airfield, China	28°48′02″N 104°32′46″E	Transshipment point in Southeast China, used by ATC as a hub on Routes Able and Mike. Now Yibin Airport (IATA: YBP, ICAO: ZUYB). Appears also to be a PLA-AF base.
4	1335th	Jorhat Airfield, India	26°43′54″N 094°10′32″E	Opened in 1943 as an axillary for Chabua on Route Charlie. Inactivated 15 June 1946. Now Jorhat Airport (IATA: JRH, ICAO: VEJT).
28	1308th	Juhu Airport; Bombay, India	19°05′53″N 072°50′02″E	Provided transshipment services from port facility to Central and eastern India. Inactivated on 13 November 1945. Juhu Airport (ICAO: VAJJ) now replaced by newer facility today for intercontinental and domestic airlines, still in use for general aviation.
16	1306th	Karachi Airport, India	24°54′24″N 067°09′39″E	Activated in March 1942. ATC Station #16. Was western ATC hub of India-China Air Route, receiving large numbers of ferried aircraft from Africa and Middle East. Large Technical Service Command presence and depot facilities. Trans-India movement made via New Delhi and Calcutta for Tenth Air Force aircraft; through Chauba for Fourteenth Air Force ferried aircraft. Also performed air transport of supplies and material in CBI. Moved large amount of shipments from port facility across India via transport aircraft. Detachment was closed on 26 June 1946.
		Katha Airfield, Burma	24°09′17″N 096°19′38″E	Japanese Airfield seized in late 1944. Opened in January 1945 as a stop on ATC Route Obo through Burma into southeastern China over Himalayas. Coosed after the war, today some remains visible, otherwise obliterated.
	1346th	Kurmitola Airfield, India	23°50′34″N 090°24′02″E	In Bengal, used as an auxiliary on southern Oboe Route through Burma into southeast China. Closed November 1945. Today Shahjalal International Airport in Bangladesh
10	1326th	Lalmanir Hat Airfield, India	25°53′33″N 089°25′41″E	Used on southern route via Burma into southeast China. Inactivated 26 October 1945. Now abandoned, extensive amount of remains visible
		Lashio Airfield, Burma	22°58′39″N 097°45′09″E	Opened in late 1944. Former Japanese airstrip located in Eastern Burma On southern Route Nan over Himalayas into southeast China. Also used by 10th AF as a fighter airstrip, ATC also used as resupply and causality evacuation field. Closed late 1945, now commercial airport. (IATA: LSH, ICAO: VYLS)
		Likiang Airfield, China	26°40′45″N 100°14′45″E	Opened November 1943. Used by ATC for ferrying aircraft, supplies and equipment into southeast China. Also used by 14th AF. Closed September 1945. Now Lijiang Airport (IATA: LJG, ICAO: ZPLJ).
		Liuchow Airfield, China	24°12′27″N 109°23′28″E	Opened in April 1943 as 14th AF fighter airfield, home of 23d Fighter Group (Flying Tigers). Evacuated and over run by Japanese Army forces in December 1944, recaptured by Chinese forces in July 1945. On ATC Routes Nan and Easy, used for receiving supplies and equipment, aircraft turnaround for return flight to Assam Valley. Closed October 1945. Now Liuzhou Bailian Airport.
		Loping Airfield, China	24°50′42″N 104°18′31″E	Hub of Routes Easy and Mike. Primary transport base on the Chinese side of "the Hump" air supply route over the Himalayan Mountains. Also used by 14th AF a transport base, primarily moving Chinese troops and their equipment from the base to other locations in China. The Americans used the base until the end of December 1945, when their closed their facilities at the station. Abandoned after the war, no remains today.
		Lushien Airfield, China	28°51′09″N 105°23′34″E	Built in late 1944. Terminus of Route Able. Closed December 1945. Now Luzhou Airport (IATA: LZO, ICAO: ZULZ).
		Mangshih Airfield, China	24°24′01″N 098°31′53″E	Opened December 1944. On Southern Route Fox. Closed November 1945. Now Dehong Mangshi Airport (IATA: LUM, ICAO: ZPLX).
		Manipur Road Airfield, India	25°53′01″N 093°46′19″E	Opened in November 1943. Way-station on Northern On Route Fox in Assam Valley. Closed August 1945. Now IAF Dimapur Airport/Air Base. (IATA: DMU, ICAO: VEMR)
		Mengasa Airfield	23°52′33″N 100°05′59″E	On Route Oboe. Obliterated, now part of urban area of Linxiang
11	1328th	Misamari Airfield, India	26°49′01″N 092°35′52″E	On Route Able. Inactivated 20 October 1945
9	1332d	Mohanbari Airfield, India	27°29′02″N 095°01′01″E	Opened March 1942. On Route Able over Himalayas into China. Major point of departure for ATC transports. Inactivated 5 December 1945. Now Dibrugarh Airport (IATA: DIB, ICAO: VEMN).
21	1331st	Moran Airfield, India	27°08′34″N 094°54′15″E	In Assam Valley, sub-base of Chauba. Used for landings and takeoffs on Able route. Inactivated on 7 March 1945
		Myitkyina Airfield, Burma	25°23′01″N 097°21′06″E	Major combat airfield for 10th AF and RAF in Burma. Captured by Japanese on 8 May 1942 during their conquest of Burma. During the occupation, it was used by the Japanese Air Force as a fighter base, attacking Allied aircraft flying "the Hump" transport supply missions between India and China. Retaken by Allied forces in May 1944. Used as a combat resupply airfield, air-dropping pallets of supplies and ammunition to the advancing Allied forces on the ground. Also used by ATC as a hub on the Peter, Fox and Oboe Routes, with supply and passenger flights between the airfield and China until December 1945 when American forces pulled out of the area at the end of the war.
18	1312th	Ondal Airfield, India	23°35′38″N 087°13′28″E	Opened January 1943. Primarily 10th Air Force B-25 airfield. Used as ferrying station on Trans-India route to Assam Valley. Inactivated on 7 February 1945. Now abandoned with runways, taxiways visible in imagery.
		Paoshan Airfield, China	25°03′13″N 099°10′04″E	Emergency landing airfield in China on Route Easy, about halfway home to Chauba. Closed November 1945. Now Baoshan Airport (IATA: BSD, ICAO: ZPBS)
		Peishiyi Airfield, China	29°29′46″N 106°21′32″E	14th AF combat base, on ATC Route Roger within China. Used as a resupply and evacuation stop by ATC. Closed 31 July 1946. Now: Chongqing Baishiyi Air Base
	1306th	RAF Jiwani, India	25°04′04″N 061°48′20″E	Former British Imperial Airways airport on Cairo-Karachi route, used by ATC as a refueling field for ferrying aircraft over Middle East or Central African Route to Karachi. 973 miles (1,566 km). USAAF operations at base ended, September 1945. Now Jiwani Airport, Pakistan (IATA: JIW, ICAO: OPJI).
29	1310th	RAF Station Negombo; Colombo, Ceylon	07°10′52″N 079°53′01″E	Used by ATC for special fights between India and Australia. Inactivated on 19 October 1945. Now Bandaranaike International Airport (IATA: CMB, ICAO: VCBI).
25		Ranchi Airfield, India	23°18′51″N 085°19′18″E	Used primarily as a staging airfield, moving supplies and equipment from Bombay and Barrackpore into southeast India though Deragon. Now Birsa Munda Airport (IATA: IXR, ICAO: VERC).
	1361st	Rupsi Airfield, India	26°08′28″N 089°54′25″E	Major transshipment facility in Assam Valley, Western terminus of Transport routes "Able" and "Easy" into and returning from China. Also home of 10th AF 308th Bombardment Group in July 1945. Closed October 1945. Now Rupsi Airfield, although largely closed, many abandoned wartime facilities evident in aerial imagery. As of May 2021, Rupsi now operates as a commercial airfield for regional airline FlyBig, connecting with Kolkata.
		Sadiya Airfield, India	27°50′35″N 095°40′00″E	Most northeasterly airfield in Assam Valley of India. Location approximate Hub of east-west "Able" transport route, also origin of westbound "Easy" route to Yunnanyi, China. Closed September 1945. Earthquakes in 1950 and in 1967 Sadiya seriously damaged and later destroyed facility, all remnants removed and today all signs of the airfield are obliterated by redevelopment, no visible remains.
		Sahmaw Airfield, Burma	25°14′35″N 096°48′06″E	Location approximate. Seized from Japanese in August 1944. Primarily 10th AF and RAF combat airfield, used by ATC as a staging airfield and hub on southern transport routes between India and China. Used on Eastbound route "Oboe" to Barrackpore, India and westbound route "Fox" from Rupsi, India, both connecting to Ipin, China. UAAF facility closed September 1945. Airfield today obliterated by redevelopment.
		Shamshernagar Airfield, India	24°23′41″N 091°55′00″E	Opened in late 1944 on southern route to China via Burma. Was a staging airfield on Route Oboe to Barrackpore, India. Currently Used as a STOL airport by Bangladesh Air Force (IATA: ZHM, ICAO: VGSH).
7	1337th	Sookerating Airfield, India	27°33′10″N 095°34′14″E	Opened in the Assam Valley in late 1944 as a sub-field of Chabua. Airfield was used as a transport base by ATC also as a 10th AF combat airfield. Used for westbound aircraft towards Rupsi, India as a landing/servicing airfield. UAAF facility closed 25 November 1945. Now IAF Sookerating Air Force Station.
		Szemao Airfield, China	22°47′41″N 100°57′32″E	Opened June 1945 on southern transport route "Nan" from Barrackpore, India to Kunming. Also used by 14th AF as a fighter base. USAAF facilities closed in October 1945. Today Simao Airport (IATA: SYM, ICAO: ZPSM).
		Tamu Airfield, Burma	24°12′21″N 094°18′19″E	Location approximate. Seized from Japanese on 4 August 1944 during Battle of Imphal. Used by 10th AF as a combat reconnaissance airfield, ATC used facility as both as resupply and evacuation tactical field and also as transport base on Route "Oboe" between Sookerating and Bhamo. USAAF closed Facility December 1945. Today obliterated by urban area.
	1345th	Tezgaon Airfield, India	23°46′39″N 090°22′59″E	Also known as RAF Dainodda. Built by RAF in 1941 as a Royal Indian Air Force (RIAF) station. The first RIAF light fighter landed on the under‑construction runway of Tejgaon at the beginning of 1943. ATC use began in March 1944. On Route "NAN" and "Obo" to and from Barrackpore, India to Kunming. USAAF use ended January 1945. Tejgaon Airport became the first airport to operate civil aviation in the then East Pakistan and it was also a station of the Pakistan Air Force. After 1971 it became the first civil airport of Bangladesh. Today it is a part of BAF (Bangladesh Air Force) Base Bashar (ICAO: VGTJ).
5	1327th	Tezpur Airfield, India	26°42′44″N 092°47′14″E	Constructed by the British Royal Indian Air Force during World War II in 1942. Used as a 10th AF B-24 bomber base. Used by ATC as a sub-field of Chabua on Route "Able" from Rupsi, India to Ipin, China in both directions. USAAF operations ended 26 October 1945. Now IAF Tezpur Air Force Station (IATA: TEZ, ICAO: VETZ).
		Tsuyung Airfield, China	25°00′39″N 101°33′57″E	ATC transport field opened June 1944 between Paoshan and Kunming on Route Easy. Closed by USAAF in late 1945. Now obliterated, now part of urban area of Chuxiong.
		Tulihal Airfield, India	26°45′36″N 093°53′48″E	Initially used as 10th AF combat airfield during 1942 Battle of Imphal, when Japanese forces attempted to invade India, but were driven back into Burma with heavy losses. Used by ATC on Transport route "Oboe", from Samhaw to Sookerating . USAAF closed facilities late 1945. Now Imphal Airport (IATA: IMF, ICAO: VEIM).
14	1341st	Yangkai Airfield, China	25°24′14″N 103°06′46″E	14th AF combat airfield used by B-25 Mitchells. Used by ATC for combat resupply and casualty evacuation to Kunming. Closed 10 September 1945. Airfield visible in imagery, in undetermined status.
12	1338th	Yunnanyi Airfield, China	25°26′44″N 100°44′05″E	Established in December 1942. Had supported American Volunteer Group prior to the AVG being disbanded. ATC staging airfield on Transport Route "Love" (Barrackpore, India Eastbound to Ipin, China). Also connected into Kunming on Routes "Charlie" and "Peter" westbound to Barrackpore. Contained large storage facilities for equipment and supplies. Also supported 14th AF Fighter units. Closed October 1945. Now Xiangyun Airport, status is undetermined and it may be closed.

== See also ==
- China Burma India Theater
- Chinese Army in India
- South Atlantic air ferry route in World War II
