= List of airports in Assam =

This article includes a list of airports in the Indian state of Assam, including airports for domestic, international or military usage.

== Contents ==
This list contains the following information:

1. Location served – Town or city that the airport mainly serves. This may not always be an exact location as some airports are situated in the periphery of the town/city they serve.
2. ICAO – The location indicator assigned by the International Civil Aviation Organization (ICAO)
3. IATA – The three letter airport code assigned by the International Air Transport Association
4. Operator – Operator of the airport
5. Role – Role of the airport as given by the table below

Role of airport
Role	Description
International	Airport that handles international flights
Customs	Airports with customs checking and clearance facilities handling international flights but not elevated to international airport status
Domestic	Airport that handles domestic flights only
Civil enclave	Portions of military airfield for civilian use
Military	Airports used for defence purposes

== List ==
List of airports
Location served	Airport name	ICAO	IATA	Operator	Role
Chabua	Chabua Air Force Station	VECA	—	Indian Air Force	Military
Dibrugarh	Dibrugarh Airport	VEMN	DIB	Airports Authority of India	Domestic
Jorhat	Jorhat Airport	VEJT	JRH	Airports Authority of India	Domestic
North Lakhimpur	Lilabari Airport	VELR	IXI	Airports Authority of India	Domestic
Guwahati	Lokpriya Gopinath Bordoloi International Airport	VEGT	GAU	Adani Group	International
Dhubri	Rupsi Airport	VERU	RUP	Airports Authority of India	Domestic
Silchar	Silchar Airport	VEKU	IXS	Airports Authority of India	Civil enclave
Sookerating	Sookerating Air Force Station	VESK	—	Indian Air Force	Military
Tezpur	Tezpur Airport	VETZ	TEZ	Airports Authority of India	Civil enclave
