= 13th Air Transport Squadron =

- Active: 1942–1943; 1952–1957; 1969–1970
- Country: United States
- Branch: United States Air Force
- Type: Airlift
- Engagements: China Burma India Theater

The 13th Air Transport Squadron is an inactive United States Air Force unit. Its last assignment was to the 2nd Aircraft Delivery Group of Tactical Air Command at Dobbins Air Force Base, Georgia, where it was inactivated on 30 September 1970.

The squadron was first activated during World War II and served in the Air Transport Command in the China Burma India Theater, where it flew airlift missions over The Hump.

The squadron was reactivated under Military Air Transport Service (MATS) in 1952 as a medium airlift unit and served in that role until MATS inactivated its 1703d Air Transport Group and drew down its operations at Brookley AFB. Alabama.

It was active for a short period at Dobbins AFB, Georgia as a VIP airlift unit before its final inactivation.

== History ==
=== World War II ===
The squadron was first activated as the 13th Air Corps Ferrying Squadron, a C-46 Commando squadron at Pope Field, North Carolina, serving with the 1st Ferrying Group. It deployed to India where it was an element of Tenth Air Force until it was transferred to the India-China Wing of the Air Transport Command (ATC) in India where the squadron flew the India to China route over The Hump. It was disbanded in December 1943 in a reorganization of ATC and was replaced by Station 6, India-China Wing, Air Transport Command.

=== Service with Military Air Transport Command ===
The 13th was reconstituted and reactivated in 1952 as the 13th Air Transport Squadron, Medium at Brookley Air Force Base, Alabama, where it replaced the 1281st Air Transport Squadron when MATS converted its table of distribution air transport squadrons to table of organization units controlled by Headquarters, USAF. The squadron equipped with C-124 Globemaster II intercontinental strategic transports, it flew long range strategic airlift missions until 1957 when the unit was inactivated as part of the Military Air Transport Service (MATS) pullout from Brookley.

=== VIP Airlift ===
The squadron again replaced a unit controlled by a major command in 1969 when Tactical Air Command (TAC) activated it to replace the 4433d Air Transport Squadron at Dobbins Air Force Base, Georgia. The 4433d had been providing VIP transport, primarily for Army officers, under various designations since 1948. The 4433d was originally organized as the 5th Special Air Missions Squadron under Bolling Field Command in the spring of 1948. on 19 July 1948 it became the 1115th Special Air Missions Squadron when Headquarters, USAF required units controlled by its major air commands to be numbered with four digits in assigned blocks of numbers. In November 1952, the squadron was transferred to Continental Air Command, which required renumbering to the 2315th Air Transport Squadron, Light. Transfer to TAC in July 1960 resulted in another designation, the 4433d Air Transport Squadron, Light, but the squadron mission remained the same. TAC finally inactivated its VIP airlift squadrons, including the 13th, in 1970.

== Lineage ==
- Constituted as the 13th Air Corps Ferrying Squadron on 18 February 1942

Activated on 7 March 1942
Redesignated as the 13th Transport Squadron 24 March 1943
Disbanded on 1 December 1943

- Reconstituted on 20 June 1952 as the 13th Air Transport Squadron, Medium

Activated on 18 July 1952
Inactivated on 1 July 1957

- Redesignated as the 13th Air Transport Squadron on 2 September 1969

Activated on 15 October 1969
Inactivated on 30 September 1970

=== Assignments ===
- 1st Ferrying Group (later Transport Group): 7 March 1942 – 1 December 1943
- 1703d Air Transport Group: 20 July 1952
- Continental Division, MATS: 18 June 1957 – 1 July 1957
- 2nd Aircraft Delivery Group: 15 October 1969 – 30 September 1970

=== Stations ===
- Pope Field, North Carolina, 7 March 1942 – 17 March 1942
- Charleston Army Air Base, South Carolina, 17 March 1942 – 19 March 1942
- Karachi Airport, India, 15 May 1942
- New Malir Cantonment, India, 17 May 1942
- Chabua Airfield, India, 1 Aug 1942 – 1 Dec 1943
- Brookley AFB, Alabama, 1952–1957
- Dobbins AFB, Georgia, 1969–1970

=== Aircraft ===
- C-46 Commando, 1942–1943
- C-54, 1952–1957
