= 301st Air Refueling Squadron =

Inactive US Air Force unit

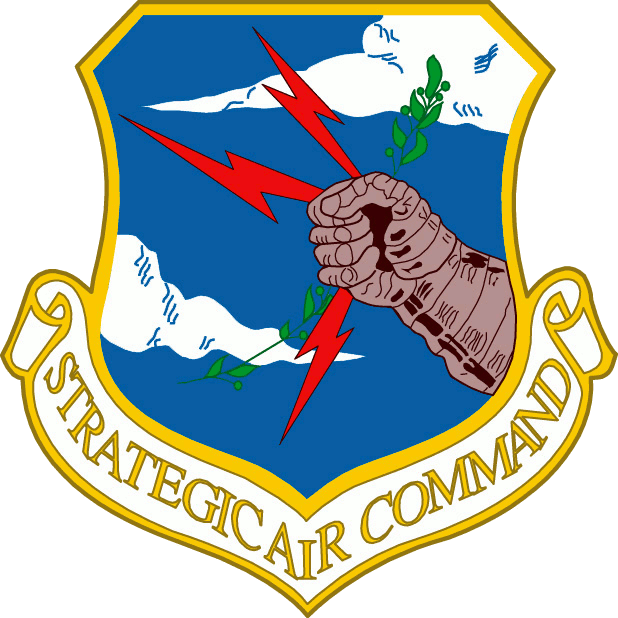
301st Air Refueling Squadron

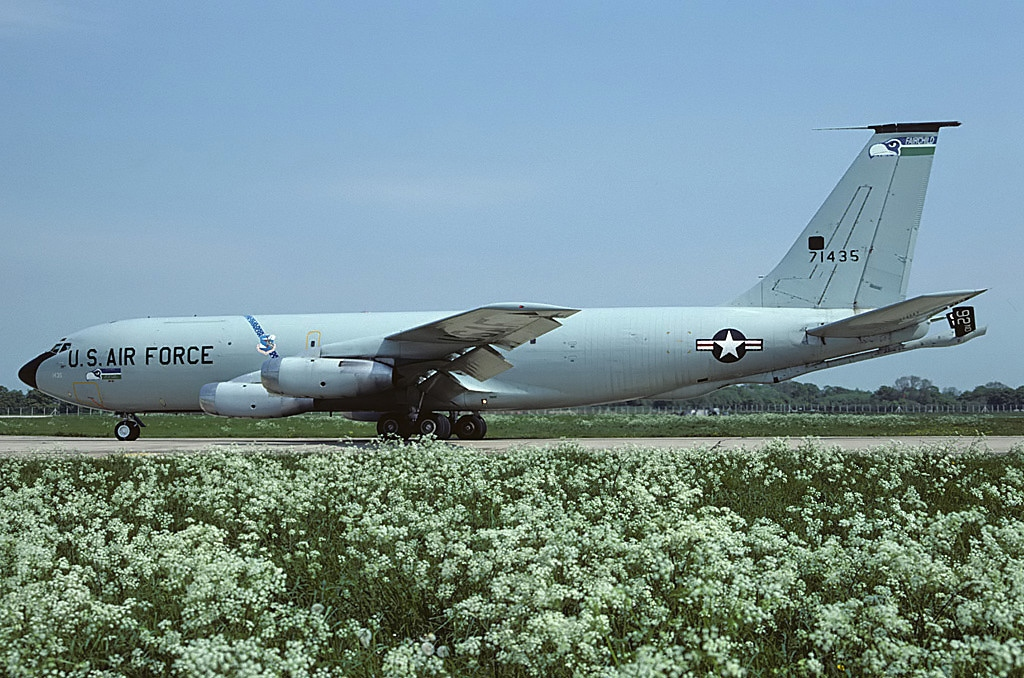
- KC-135A in Strategic Air Command markings
- Active: 1943; 1943–1944; 1949–1962: 1973–1975
- Country: United States
- Branch: United States Air Force
- Role: Aerial refueling
- Part of: Strategic Air Command
- Engagements: China Burma India Theater European Theater of World War II

Insignia
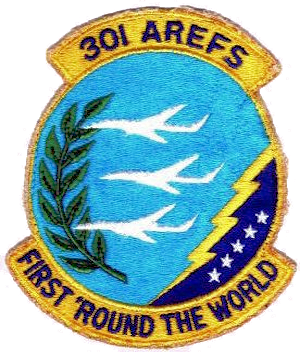
- Patch with 301st Air Refueling Squadron emblem

The 301st Air Refueling Squadron is an inactive United States Air Force (USAF) unit. It was last assigned to the 301st Air Refueling Wing at Rickenbacker Air Force Base, Ohio, where it was inactivated on 31 December 1975. In 1985 the 301st was consolidated with the World War II 301st Transport Squadron and 322d Transport Squadron. The squadron has not been active since consolidation.

The 301st Transport Squadron was an Air Transport Command airlift that operated C-47 transports flying The Hump route from India to China from Sookerating Airfield in the Assam Valley of India during 1943.

The 322d Transport Squadron performed a similar mission for United States Strategic Air Forces in England in late 1943 and early 1944.

The 301st Air Refueling Squadron performed air refueling missions to support of USAF operations on a worldwide basis. The squadron was one of the first Strategic Air Command (SAC) air refueling squadrons. It was inactivated in 1962 with the phaseout of the propeller-driven Boeing KC-97 Stratofreighter from SAC. The squadron was later activated in the early 1970s as a Boeing KC-135A Stratotanker squadron.

== History ==
=== World War II ===
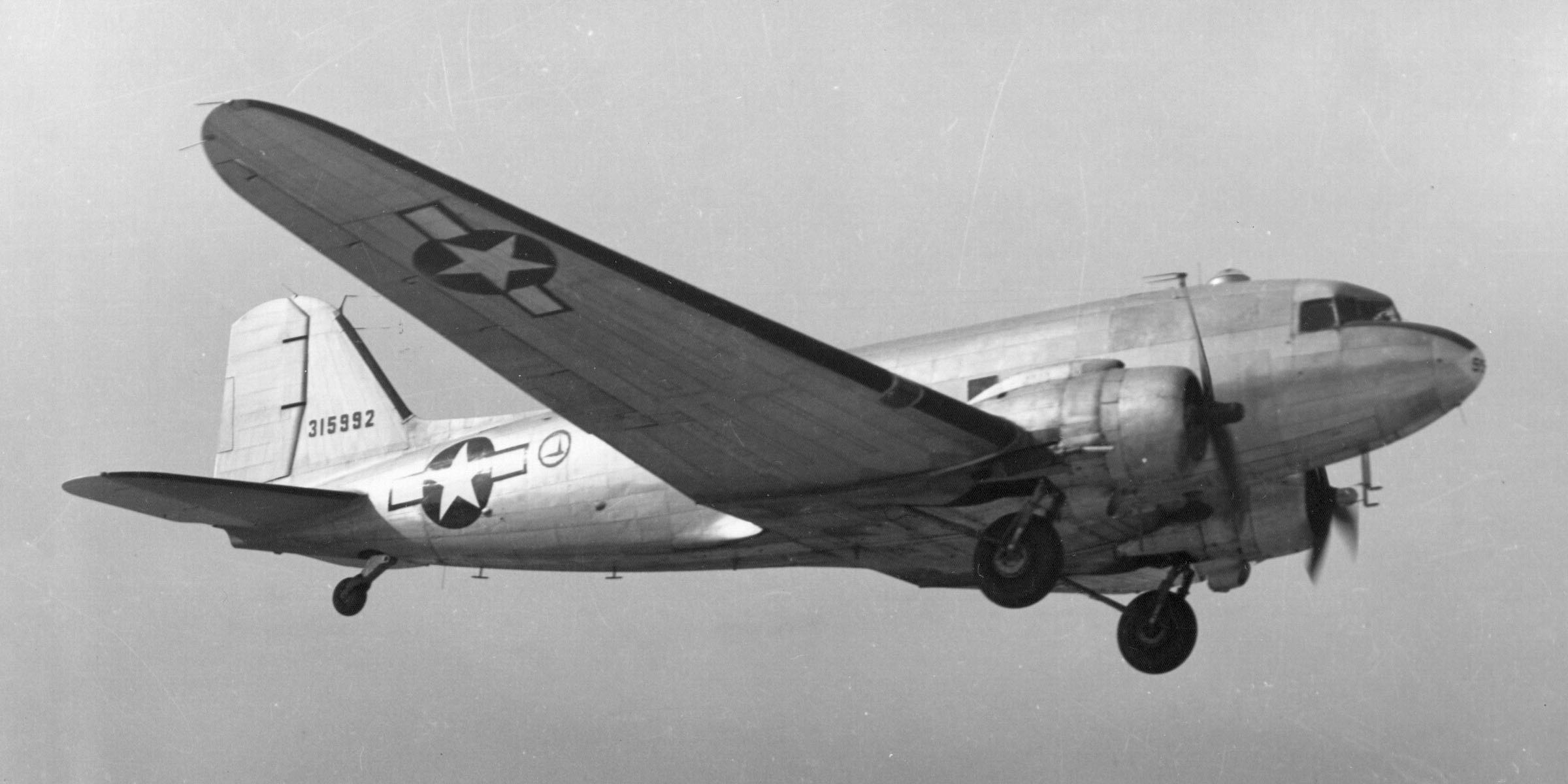
C-47 in Air Transport Command markings

The first of the two World War II squadrons that were later to be consolidated with the 301st Air Refueling Squadron was the 301st Transport Squadron, which was activated in the summer of 1943 at Sookerating Airfield, India as one of the three squadrons of the 29th Transport Group when the India-China Wing, Air Transport Command expanded by adding three groups, the 28th, 29th, and 30th Transport Groups. The squadron drew its cadre from the 13th Air Corps Ferry Squadron , which had been stationed at Sookerating since 1942. For the next five months the squadron flew personnel, equipment and supplies from its base in India over the Hump to advanced bases in China.

On 1 December 1943, the India-China Wing, Air Transport Command reorganized, disbanding its table of organization groups and squadrons and replacing them with "Stations" manned under exact manning tables. The squadron, along with the remainder of the 29th group, was replaced by Station 7, India-China Wing, Air Transport Command.

The 322d Transport Squadron was assigned to the 31st Transport Group shortly after the 301st squadron was disbanded. The 31st group was located at RAF Grove and had been activated to transport high priority passengers and cargo for IX Air Force Service Command to support Ninth Air Force and Eighth Air Force in the United Kingdom and France. The 322d squadron was disbanded only a few months after it was activated.

=== Air refueling operations ===
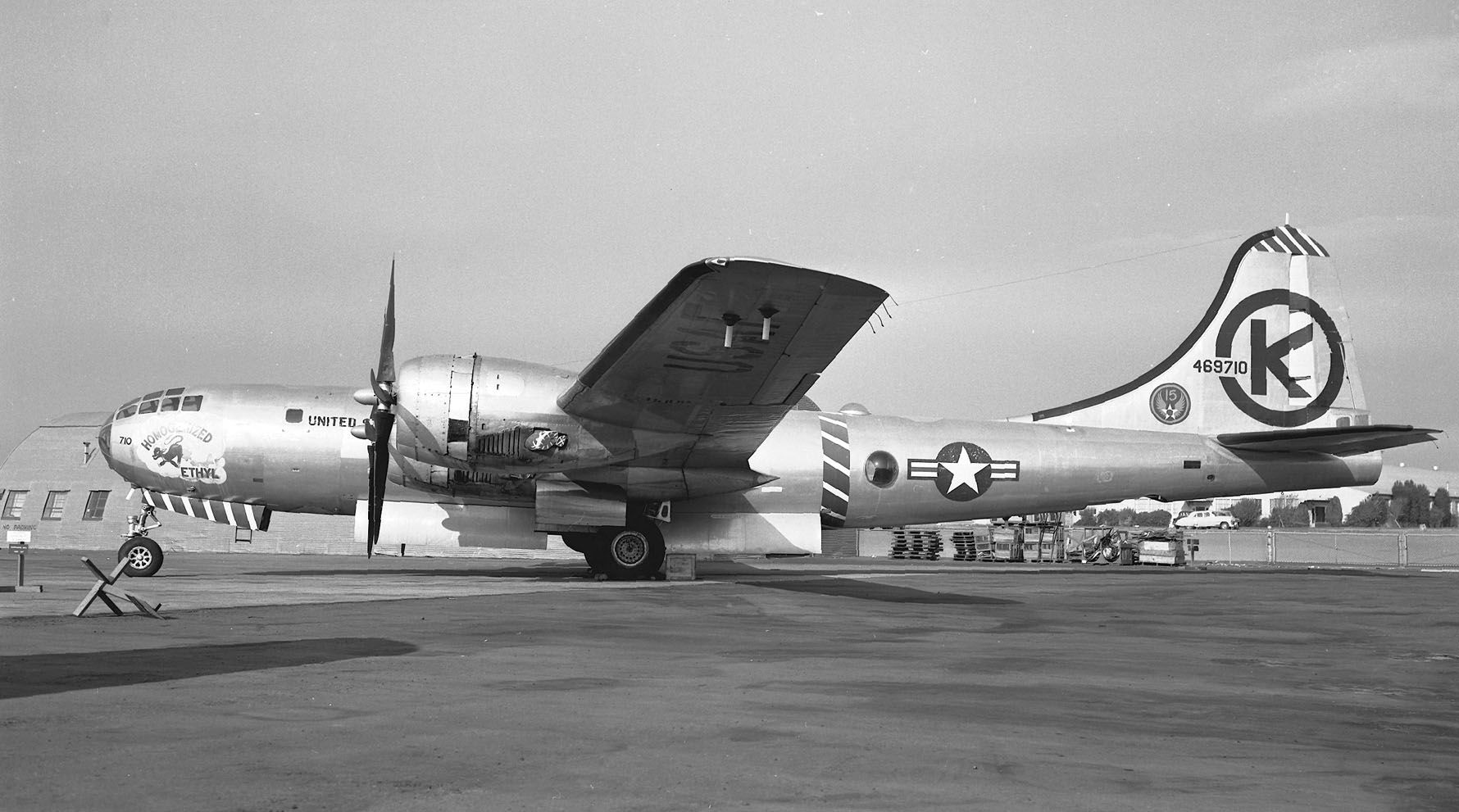
KB-29M as flown by the 301st Air Refueling Squadron

The 301st Air Refueling Squadron was activated in March 1949 at Barksdale Air Force Base, Louisiana The squadron was one of the first Strategic Air Command (SAC) air refueling squadrons established. The squadron performed air refueling in support of USAF operations on a worldwide basis as part of the 301st Bombardment Wing. The squadron performed one of its first deployments to RAF Lakenheath, England, supporting the 32d Bombardment Squadron from May to November 1950.

In the spring of 1951, SAC ordered the 301st Bombardment Wing to provide the cadre for the formation of the 376th Bombardment Wing at Barksdale, with the 301st providing the nucleus for the 376th Air Refueling Squadron. The 301st replaced its initial contingent of Boeing KB-29 Superfortresses with Boeing KC-97 Stratofreighters in 1953. After 1955, the squadron was frequently detached from its parent wing as it deployed to forward locations.

In the spring of 1958, SAC phased out Boeing B-47 Stratojet operations at Barksdale, and the 301st Bombardment Wing transferred to Lockbourne Air Force Base, Ohio. The squadron did not move, but was assigned to the 4238th Strategic Wing, which was activated in anticipation of the assignment of Boeing B-52 Stratofortresses to Barksdale.

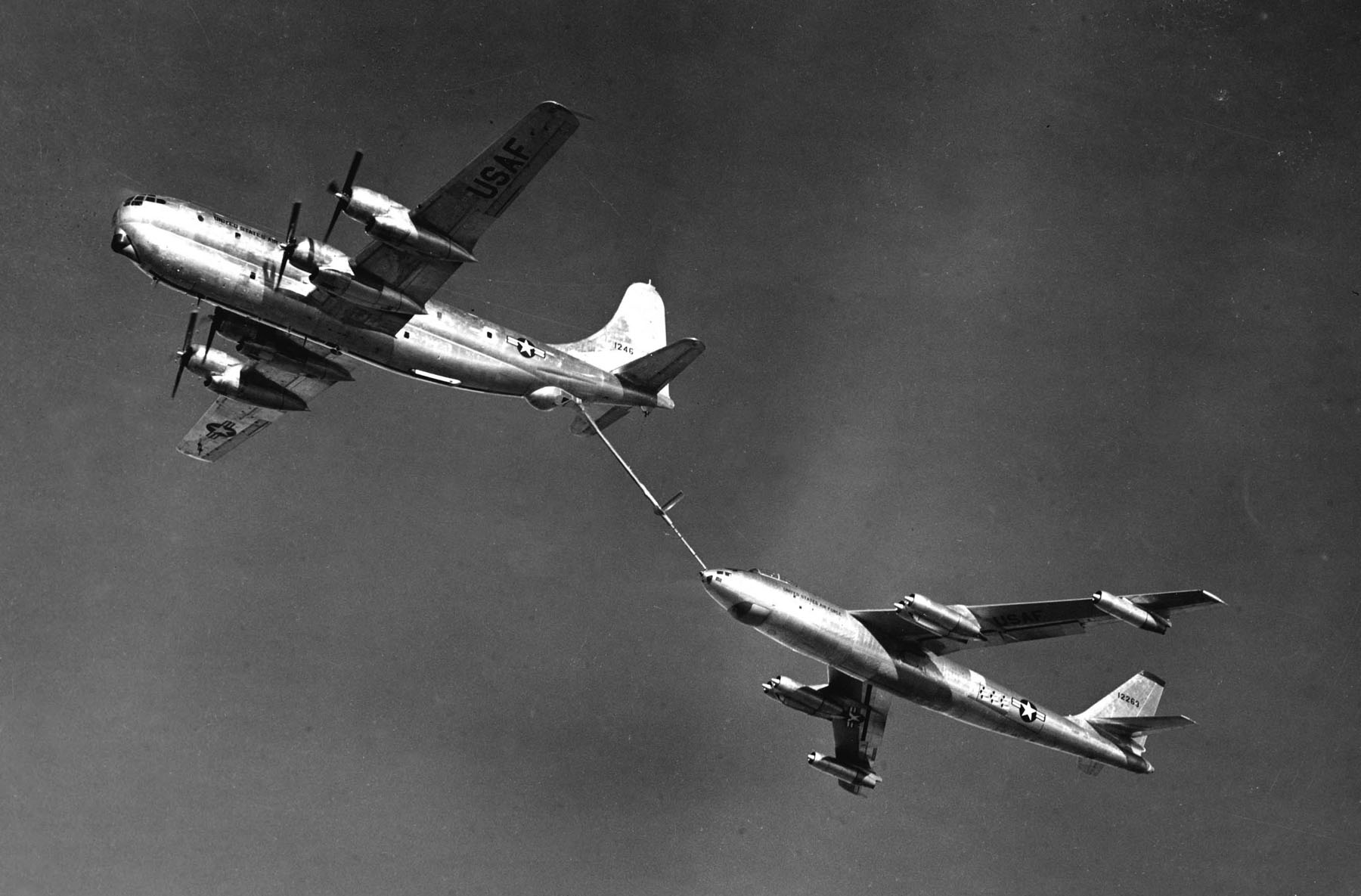
USAF KC-97F refueling a B-47B

The 301st Deployed to Lajes Air Base in the Azores Islands in 1960, returning to Barksdale in mid-October. The squadron was programmed for inactivation in 1961 with the phaseout of the propeller-driven KC-97 from SAC, however instead it was reduced to half strength in the summer of 1961 and its inactivation was delayed until 1962 . During the period it operated at reduced strength the squadron continued to deploy to Goose Air Base, Canada as late as April 1962. As the 301st reduced in size, its companion refueling squadron in the 4238th Strategic Wing, the 913th Air Refueling Squadron, which flew more modern Boeing KC-135 Stratotankers, doubled its strength.

The 301st was reactivated in 1973 at Lockbourne as a KC-135A squadron. In 1975, the 301st wing transferred eight KC-135s to the 160th Air Refueling Group of the Ohio Air National Guard, which became the first SAC gained Air National Guard unit under the "Total Force" concept. The squadron was inactivated at the end of 1975.

== Lineage ==
- Constituted as the 301st Transport Squadron c. 4 June 1943

Activated on 21 June 1943
Disbanded on 1 December 1943

- Reconstituted on 19 September 1985 and consolidated with 322nd Transport Squadron (Cargo& Mail) and 301st Air Refueling Squadron as the 301st Air Refueling Squadron
- Constituted as the 322d Transport Squadron (Cargo & Mail) 1943

Activated c. 5 December 1943
Disbanded 9 April 1944

- Reconstituted 19 September 1985 and consolidated with 301st Transport Squadron and the 301st Air Refueling Squadron as the 301st Air Refueling Squadron
- Constituted as the 301st Air Refueling Squadron, Medium on 2 February 1949

Activated on 1 March 1949
Inactivated: on 1 July 1962
Redesignated 301st Air Refueling Squadron, Heavy, on 19 June 1973
Activated: on 30 September 1973
Inactivated on 31 December 1975

- Consolidated with 322nd Transport Squadron (Cargo& Mail) and 301st Transport Squadron on 19 September 1985

=== Assignments ===
- 29th Transport Group, 4 June 1943 – 1 December 1943
- 31st Transport Group, c. 4 December 1943 – 9 April 1944
- 301st Bombardment Group, 7 November 1949 (attached to 301st Bombardment Wing after 14 February 1951)
- 301st Bombardment Wing, 16 June 1952 (detached 20 June 1955 – 26 June 1955, 10 July 1955 – 18 September 1955, 27 April 1956 – 27 June 1956, 15 November 1956 – 6 December 1956, 27 December 1956 – 28 February 1957)
- 4238th Strategic Wing, 15 April 1958 – 1 July 1962
- 301st Air Refueling Wing, 30 September 1973 – 31 December 1975

=== Stations ===
- Sookerating Airport, India, 21 June 1943 – 1 December 1943
- England, c. 4 December 1943 – 9 April 1944
- Barksdale Air Force Base, Louisiana, 7 November 1949 – 1 July 1962
- Lockbourne Air Force Base (later Rickenbacker Air Force Base), Ohio, 30 September 1973 – 31 December 1975

=== Aircraft ===
- Douglas C-47 Skytrain, 1943
- Boeing KB-29M Superfortress, 1949–1953
- Boeing KC-97F Stratotanker, 1953–1962
- Boeing KC-97G Stratotanker, 1953–1962
- Boeing KC-135A Stratotanker, 1973–1975

=== Campaign and service streamers ===
Campaign Streamer	Campaign	Dates	Notes
	India-Burma	21 June 1943 – 1 December 1943	301st Transport Squadron
	EAME Theater without inscription	December 1943-9 April 1944	322d Transport Squadron

== See also ==
- List of B-29 Superfortress operators
- Air Transport Command
