= 1703rd Air Transport Group =

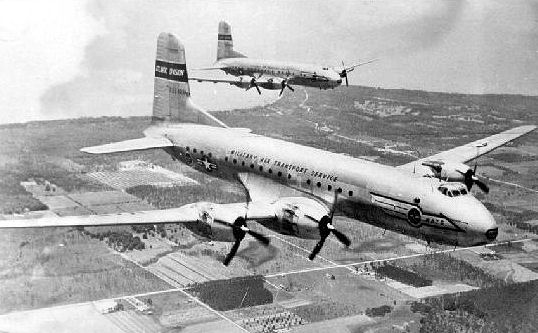
- Two Douglas C-74 Globemasters of the 1703rd Air Transport Group
- Active: 1947–1957
- Country: United States
- Branch: United States Air Force
- Type: Airlift

The 1703rd Air Transport Group is an inactive United States Air Force unit. It was assigned to Military Air Transport Service (MATS) at Brookley Air Force Base, Alabama. It was inactivated on 18 June 1957. The group was formed in 1948 as the 521st Air Transport Group when MATS replaced Air Transport Command and converted its units to the Wing Base organization system.

== History ==
=== Formation ===
The organization was formed at Brookley Air Force Base, Alabama in June 1948, absorbing the mission, personnel and Douglas C-74 Globemasters of the 3rd Air Transport Group (Provisional). The 3rd Group was organized on 7 May 1947 when Globemaster operations at their original station, Morrison Field, Florida ended. While active, it was the United States Air Force's only C-74 very heavy airlift unit, providing worldwide transport missions from Brookley until the aircraft was retired in 1955.

Initially two C-74 squadrons (17th and 19th) formed from provisional units, later redesignated 1258th and 1260th Air Transport Squadrons. The group was assigned to the Atlantic Division, Military Air Transport Service, which controlled Military Air Transport Service unis on the east coast of the United States, across the Atlantic Ocean to Europe, North Africa, the Mediterranean and the Caribbean.

=== Berlin Airlift ===
Sent one C-74 (42-65414) to Frankfurt, Germany Rhein-Main Airfield on 14 August 1948 to support Berlin Airlift Operations. On 18 September, the C-74 flew a total of six round trips to Tempelhof Central Airport, Berlin. The single C-74 was instrumental in helping build Tegel Airfield in the French sector of Berlin, hauling in heavy construction equipment that had been dismantled into components. The aircraft operated as part of the airlift for six weeks, but it was simply too heavy for the Tempelhof runways. There are also stories that the Soviets complained that it might be used as a bomber because of its hoist well in the belly.

Support for the Berlin Airlift was maintained by the group by flying regularly scheduled flights between the United States and Germany. Transported C-54 engines and parts for use in the airlift. Other flights were made between Brookley and Albrook Field, Balboa, Canal Zone and from Brookley to Ramey AFB, Puerto Rico. In May, a C-74 carried 75 passengers plus a crew of 12 to England, at the time the largest military passenger load to fly the Atlantic. Six months later, on 25 November 25, C-74 414, flew the Atlantic with a record 103 people aboard to RAF Marham, England.

=== Korean War ===
During the Korean War, the Group logged over 7000 hours in flights to Hawaii hauling troops and high priority cargo westward toward the combat area and returning eastward with wounded personnel. During the seven months between July 1950 and January 1951, the Globemasters transported 2,486 patients, 550 passengers, and 128,000 pounds of cargo from Hawaii to the U.S. while hauling just under a million pounds of cargo westward.

Activated 1281st Air Transport Squadron in November 1951, initially equipped with C-54 Skymasters, upgraded to new C-124C Globemaster II heavy lift strategic transports in 1952.

Reorganized in July 1952, the 1258th, 1260th, 1281st ATS became 3rd, 6th and 13th Air Transport Squadrons, respectively. With the small number of C-74s in service, maintenance was an increasing headache as time went on and spares became harder to obtain. In 1955, the C-74's maintenance man-hour requirements were so high that a two-hour-a-day utilization rate was requested and approved. During the Spring, a program was begun to cross-flow C-74 pilots and engineers to the C-124 in preparation for the C-74's retirement. The 6th ATS flew 45 scheduled and special trips during their last six months. Their destinations included Europe, North Africa, South America, and the Middle East carrying over six million pounds of cargo, nearly one million pounds of mail, and 1,750 passengers.

=== Winding down operations ===
However, deterioration of the C-74's components were progressing more rapidly than predicted. Plans were made for the eventual retirement of the Air Force's only fleet of Globemasters. Aircraft were withdrawn from service in late 1955, with 3rd and 6th ATS being inactivated.

Continued operations of C-124s until 1957 when unit was inactivated when control of Brookley AFB was reassigned to Air Materiel Command.

== Lineage ==
- Designated as the 521st Air Transport Group on 14 May 1948

Organized on 1 June 1948
Redesignated 1601st Air Transport Group on 1 October 1948
Redesignated 1703rd Air Transport Group on 25 October 1949
Discontinued on 18 June 1957

=== Assignments ===
- Atlantic Division, Military Air Transport Service, 1 June 1948
- Continental Division, Military Air Transport Service, 25 October 1949
- 1701st Air Transport Wing, 1 May 1953 – 18 June 1957

=== Units ===
- 3rd Air Transport Squadron, 20 July 1952 – 1 November 1955
- 13th Air Transport Squadron, 20 July 1952 – 18 June 1957
- 6th Air Transport Squadron, 20 July 1952 – 30 June 1955
- 17th Air Transport Squadron (later 1258th Air Transport Squadron), 1 July 1947 – 1 June 1949
- 18th Air Transport Squadron (later 1259th Air Transport Squadron), 1 July 1947 – 1 July 1949
- 19th Air Transport Squadron (later 1260th Air Transport Squadron), 1 July 1947 – 20 July 1952
- 1258th Air Transport Squadron, Heavy, 20 March 1950 – 20 July 1952
- 1281st Air Transport Squadron, 24 July 1951 – 20 July 1952
- 1731st Air Transport Squadron (Aeromedical Evacuation), 1 June 1952 – 1 February 1953

Scott Air Force Base, Illinois

- 1732nd Air Transport Squadron (Aeromedical Evacuation), 1 April 1950 – 20 July 1952

Westover Air Force Base, Massachusetts

- 1735th Air Transport Squadron (Aeromedical Evacuation), 1 July 1950 – 1 February 1953

=== Stations ===
- Brookley Air Force Base, Alabama, 1 June 1948 – 18 June 1957

=== Aircraft ===
- C-74 Globemaster, 1948–1955
- C-131 Samaritan, 1954–1957
- C-54 Skymaster, 1951–1952
- C-124 Globemaster II, 1952–1957
