= 1st Ferrying Group =

1st Ferrying Group (later 1st Transport Group, 431st Military Airlift Training Group)
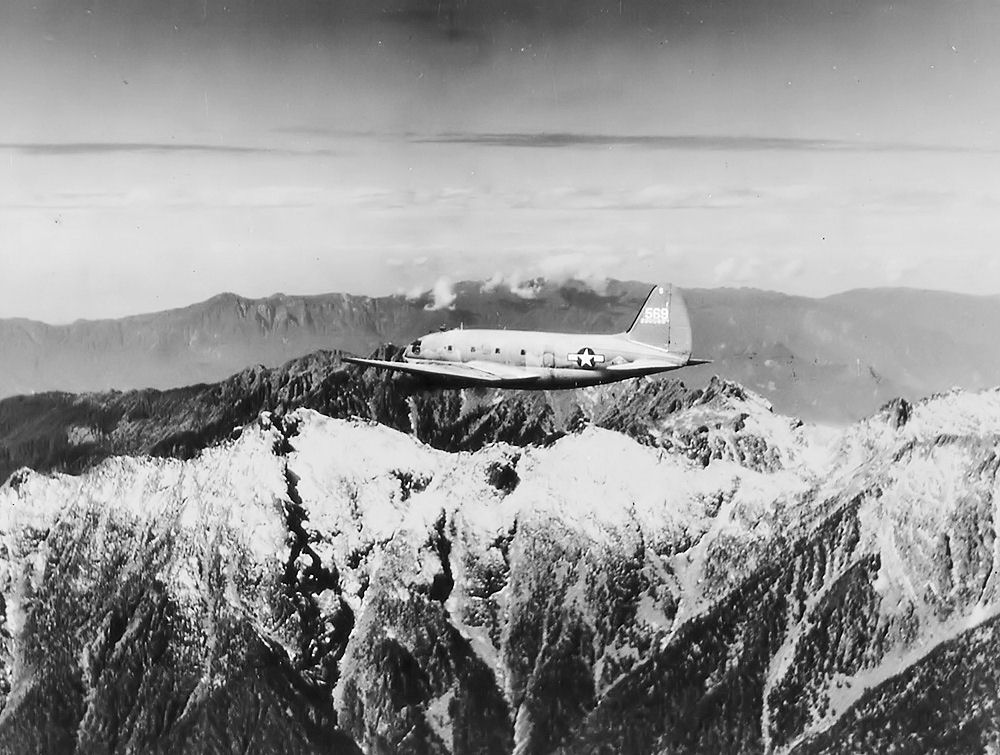
- C-46 Commando flying The Hump
- Active: 1942–1943
- Disbanded: 1 December 1943
- Country: United States
- Branch: United States Air Force
- Role: Strategic airlift
- Part of: Air Transport Command
- Engagements: China Burma India Theater

The 1st Ferrying Group was a unit of the Army Air Forces during World War II. It was the first transport group to deploy overseas and the first to fly transport missions over the Hump. It was redesignated the 1st Transport Group, then disbanded in December 1943, when the India-China Wing, Air Transport Command adopted a station organization. The group was reconstituted in 1985 as the 431st Military Airlift Training Group, but has not been active.

== History ==
The 1st Ferrying Group was organized in March 1942 at Pope Field, North Carolina. After briefly training with Douglas C-47 Skytrains, it deployed to India, using the South Atlantic route. On arrival in India, it became part of Tenth Air Force and began flying missions over the Hump to resupply Chinese and American forces in China. Shortly after its arrival, it was transferred to the newly formed India-China Wing, Air Transport Command. It continued to fly transport missions until it was disbanded in December 1943, when the India-China Wing reorganized to create a single unit at each of its stations.

The group was reconstituted in July 1985 as the 431st Military Airlift Training Group, but has not been active.

== Lineage ==
- Constituted as the 1st Ferrying Group on 3 March 1942

Activated 7 March 1942
Redesignated 1st Transport Group c. 24 March 1943
Disbanded on 1 December 1943

- Reconstituted on 31 July 1985 and redesignated 431st Military Airlift Training Group (not active)

=== Assignments ===
- Air Force Combat Command, 3 March 1942
- Tenth Air Force, c. 17 May 1942
- India-China Wing, Air Transport Command, July 1942 – 1 December 1943

=== Components ===
- 3d Air Corps Ferry Squadron (later 3d Ferrying Squadron, 3d Transport Squadron; 7 March 1942 – 1 December 1943
- 6th Air Corps Ferry Squadron (later 6th Ferrying Squadron, 6th Transport Squadron; 7 March 1942 – 1 December 1943
- 13th Air Corps Ferry Squadron (later 13th Ferrying Squadron, 13th Transport Squadron; 7 March 1942 – 1 December 1943

=== Stations ===
- Pope Field, North Carolina, 7 March 1942
- Charleston Municipal Airport, South Carolina, 17–19 March 1942
- New Malir Cantonment, India, 17 May 1942
- Dinjan Airfield, India, c. June 1942
- Chabua Airfield, India, 1942 – 31 December 1943

=== Campaign ===
Campaign Streamer	Campaign	Dates	Notes
	India-Burma	2 April 1943 – 1 December 1943	
