= 1701st Air Transport Wing =

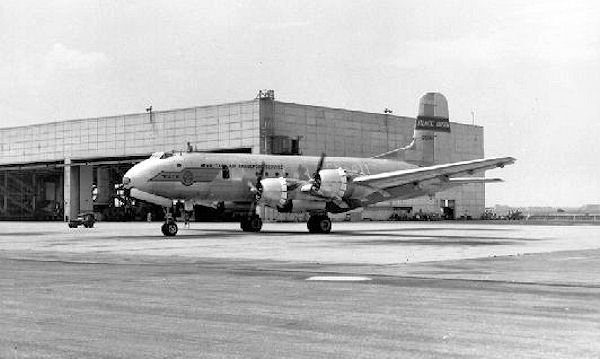
- Wing Douglas C-74 Globemaster at Brookley AFB
- Active: 1944–1957
- Country: United States
- Branch: United States Air Force
- Role: Airlift

The 1701st Air Transport Wing is a discontinued United States Air Force unit. It was last assigned to Continental Division, Military Air Transport Service (MATS) at Great Falls Air Force Base, Montana, where it was discontinued on 1 May 1953. The wing was formed as the 517th Air Transport Wing in 1948, when MATS replaced Air Transport Command and Naval Air Transport Service and reorganized its units under the wing base organization. The wing trained MATS aircrews, most notably for the Berlin Airlift. MATS training operations moved to Palm Beach Air Force Base in the early 1950s and the wing was discontinued when Great Falls was turned over to MATS' Air Resupply and Communications Service.

== History ==
The 517th Air Transport Wing was organized at Great Falls Air Force Base in June 1948, when Military Air Transport Service (MATS) replaced Air Transport Command (ATC) and Naval Air Transport Service and reorganized its Air Force elements under the wing-base organization system. The new wing assumed the personnel and equipment of the 1455th AF Base Unit (Air Transport) of ATC and continued its mission of training aircrews for airlift units.

On 25 June 1948 Operation Vittles, the strategic airlift of supplies to Berlin's 2,000,000 inhabitants, was initiated. The 517th (later 1701st) played a critical role in assuring the success of this vital operation. Officials selected Great Falls as the only replacement aircrew training site for Berlin Airlift-bound C-54s. It formed a provisional unit, the 1435th Air Transport Group, to perform this mission, using resources from the wing's 1701st Air Transport Group. Using radio beacons, Great Falls was transformed to resemble Tempelhof Airport in Berlin, Germany. Hundreds of pilots and flight engineers many of whom were recalled to active duty, were qualified on the Douglas C-54 Skymaster aircraft and on flight procedures to and from Berlin by practicing on ground mock-ups and flying simulated airlift missions.

The 517th Air Transport Wing was redesignated the 1701st Air Transport Wing in October 1948 to comply with Air Force policy that table of distribution units be numbered in a series of four digits assigned to their parent command. The wing's primary mission was the routing and scheduling of flights throughout the Pacific Ocean region and in support of allied forces in the Korean War. MATS reopened the C-54 Flight Training School as the 1272d Medium Transition Training Unit in May 1950, one month before the Korean War began. Following Continental Air Command's formation of corollary units in the May 1949 reserve program, the wing assumed responsibility for training reservists assigned to the 8523d Air Transport Squadron (Corollary). Corollary units were reserve units integrated with an active duty unit. They were viewed as the best method to train reservists by mixing them with an existing regular unit to perform duties alongside the regular unit. In May 1951, the 8523d mobilized for the Korean war, with its personnel used as fillers for other units.

The wing assumed responsibility for a second flying group, the 1703d Air Transport Group. Until 1951, the 1703d flew Douglas C-74 Globemaster Is. In May 1951, it received its first Douglas C-124 Globemaster II, and began operational testing and evaluation of the C-124. The 1703d also had a squadron dedicated to the aeromedical evacuation mission.

In January 1951, the wing assumed responsibility for a second base, Mountain Home Air Force Base, Idaho. Mountain Home was used by MATS' Air Resupply and Communications Service (ARCS) to train its units before they deployed overseas. In November 1951, ARCS formed the 1300th Air Base Wing and assumed responsibility for Mountain Home. The 1701st was inactivated and replaced by the 1300th Wing in June 1953 when MATS transferred Mountain Home to Strategic Air Command and moved its ARCS operations to Great Falls. The MATS aircrew training mission was transferred to the 1707th Air Transport Wing at Palm Beach Air Force Base, Florida, while the wing's remaining crews and aircraft were transferred to the 1501st Air Transport Group at Travis Air Force Base, California.

=== Lineage ===
- Designated as the 517th Air Transport Wing on 14 May 1948

Organized on 1 June 1948
Redesignated 1701st Air Transport Wing, 1 October 1948
Discontinued on 1 May 1953

=== Assignments ===
- Pacific Division, Military Air Transport Service, 1 June 1948
- Continental Division, Military Air Transport Service, 1 July 1948 – 1 May 1953

=== Components ===
Operational

- 517th Air Transport Group (later 1701st Air Transport Group (Transition Training Unit)), 1 June 1948 – 1 May 1953
- 1453d Air Transport Group (Provisional), attached 1 October 1948 – c. 31 March 1949
- 1703d Air Transport Group, 25 October 1949 – 1 May 1953

Support

- 517th Air Base Group (later 1701st Air Base Group), 1 June 1948 – 1 May 1953
- 517th Supply and Maintenance Group (later 1701st Maintenance and Supply Group), 1 June 1948 – 1 May 1953
- 1701st Maintenance Group, 23 April 1949 – 25 October 1949
- 1701st Supply Group, 23 April 1949 – 25 October 1949
- 1706th Air Base Group, 1 February 1951 – 1 November 1951

=== Stations ===
- Great Falls Air Force Base, Montana, 1 June 1948 – 1 May 1953

=== Aircraft ===
- Douglas C-47 Skytrain, 1948–1953
- Douglas C-54 Skymaster, 1948–1953
- Douglas C-74 Globemaster I, 1949-1951
- Douglas C-124 Globemaster II, 1951-1953
