= Jorhat Airport =

Domestic airport serving Jorhat, Assam, India

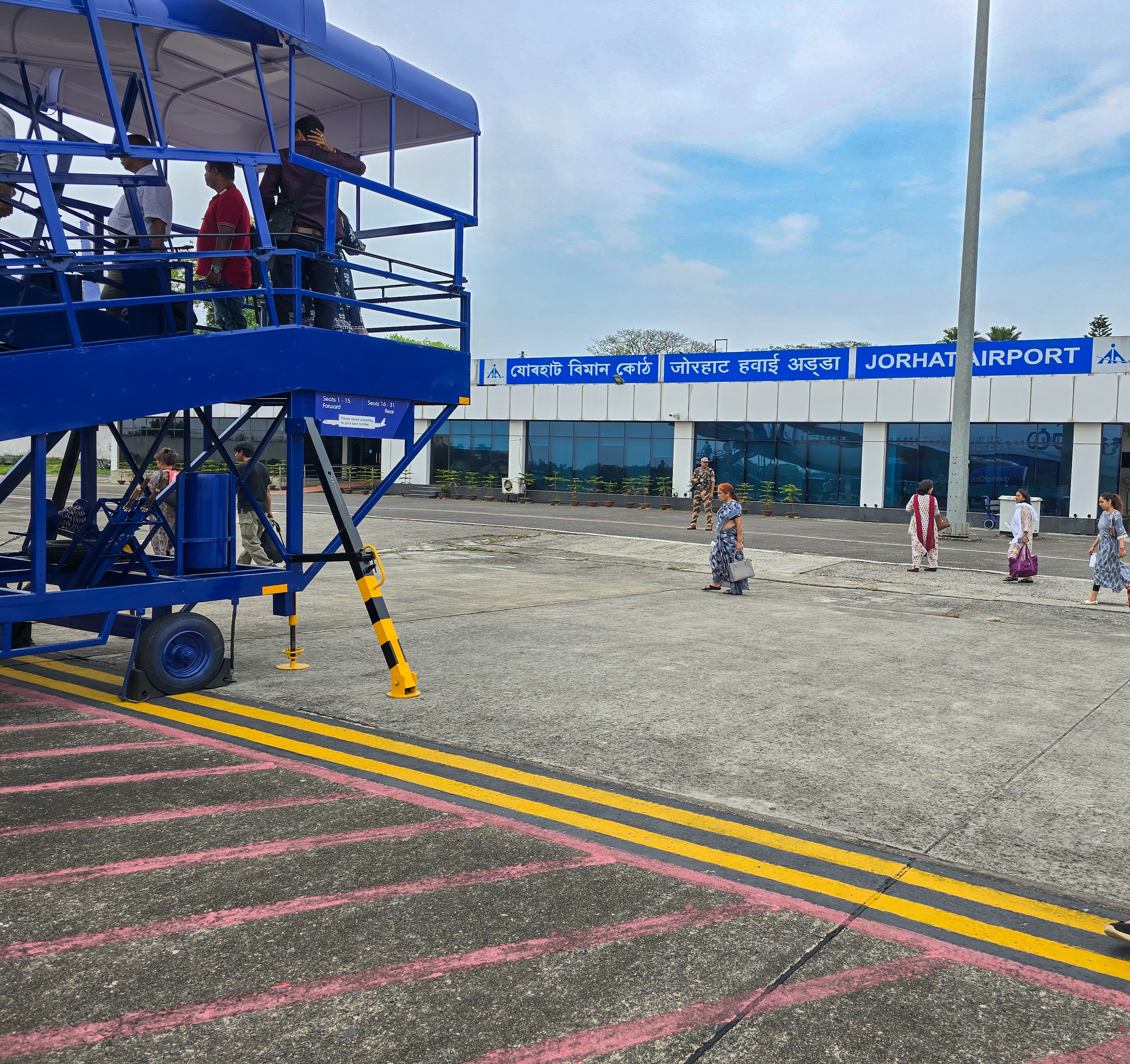
- IATA: JRH; ICAO: VEJT

Summary
- Airport type: Public/Military
- Owner/Operator: Airports Authority of India
- Serves: Jorhat
- Location: Rowriah, Jorhat, Assam, India
- Elevation AMSL: 311 ft (95 m)
- Coordinates: 26°43′54″N 094°10′32″E
- Website: Jorhat Airport

Map
- Location in Assam JRH (India)

Runways
Direction	Length		Surface
Direction	ft	m	Surface
04/22	9,000	2,743	Concrete

Statistics (April 2025 – March 2026)
- Passengers: 1,57,754 (▲20.6%)
- Aircraft movements: 1,510 (▲33.5%)
- Cargo tonnage: 121.3 (▼12.8%)
- Source: AAI

Jorhat Airport (IATA: JRH, ICAO: VEJT) is a domestic airport serving the city of Jorhat, Assam, India. It is located at Rowriah, situated 7 km (4.3 mi) south-west from Jorhat city and serves civil aviation alongside military operations.

== History ==
It was established in early 1950 for civilian use. Jorhat Airport serves as a key air link for Upper Assam alongside its military role. Jorhat AFS is the Indian Air Force's first air base in the East. It is primarily a transport base for launching aircraft that carry out airdrops in the Naga Hills in Nagaland and Arunachal Pradesh. It is equipped with two squadrons of An-32 transport aircraft. Air logistics are provided from Jorhat to the Kameng, Subansiri, Siang, Lohit and Tirap districts of Arunachal Pradesh.

== Expansion ==
On 8 February 2022, the Government of Assam approved the sanction of ₹ 156 crore for the acquisition of private land to facilitate the expansion of the airport.

== Airlines and destinations ==
Airlines	Destinations	Refs.
IndiGo	Delhi, Kolkata; Seasonal: Bangalore	
