= Brookley Air Force Base =

US Air Force base in Alabama

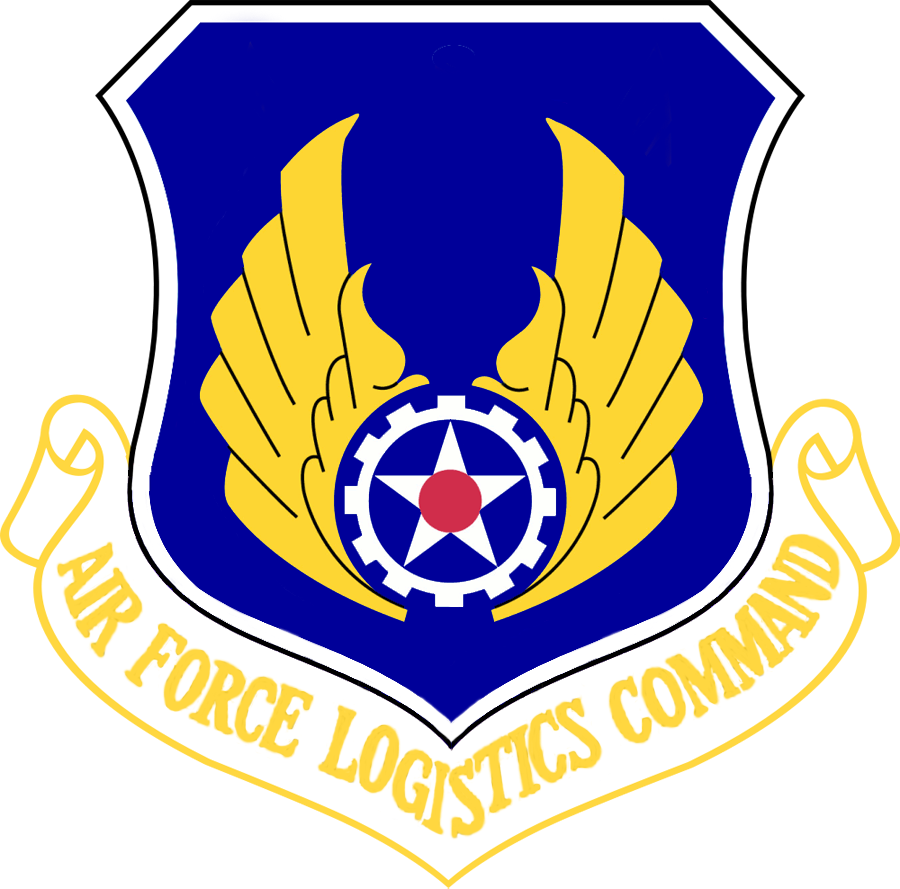
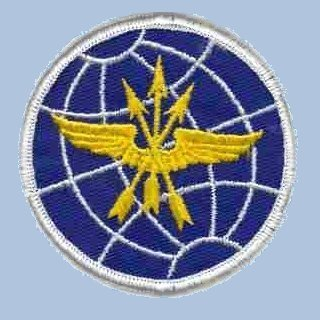
Brookley Air Force Base Brookley Field
- Part of Air Force Logistics Command (AFLC)
- Located near: Mobile, Alabama
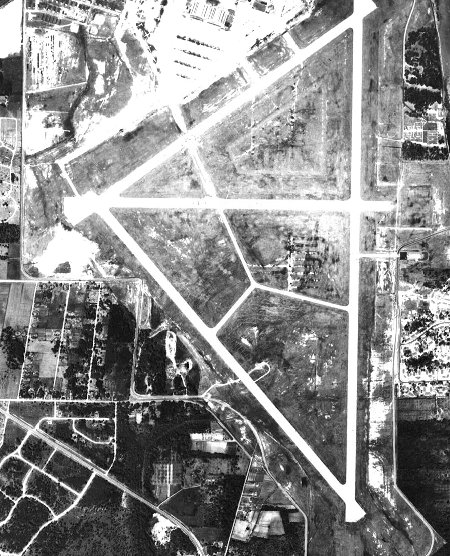
- Brookley Air Force Base - 7 April 1952

Site information
- Controlled by: United States Air Force

Location
- Location within Alabama
- Coordinates: 30°37′36″N 088°04′05″W

Site history
- Built: 1940
- In use: 1940-1969

For the civil use of Brookley AFB after 1969, see: Mobile Downtown Airport

Brookley Air Force Base is a former United States Air Force base located in Mobile, Alabama. After it closed in 1969, it became what is now known as the Mobile Aeroplex at Brookley.

== History ==
Brookley Air Force Base had its aeronautical beginnings with Mobile's first municipal airport, the original Bates Field. However, the site itself had been occupied from the time of Mobile's founding, starting with the home of Mobile's founding father, Jean-Baptiste Le Moyne, Sieur de Bienville, in the early 18th century.

In 1938 the Army Air Corps took over the then 1,000-acre (405 ha) Bates Field site and established the Brookley Field. The military was attracted to the site because of the area's generally good flying weather and the bay-front location, but Alabama Congressman Frank Boykin's influence in Washington was important in convincing the Army to locate the new military field in Mobile instead of Tampa, Florida. However, later that year, Tampa was also chosen for a military flying installation of its own, which would be named MacDill Field, home of present-day MacDill Air Force Base.

Capt. Wendell H. Brookley

Brookley Air Force Base was named after Capt. Wendell H. Brookley (1896-1934), a former World War 1 US Army pilot. Brookley was killed on February 28, 1934 while testing a new prop on a Douglas BT2-B biplane. While in flight out of Bolling Field (now known as Bolling Air Force Base) the prop mysteriously broke apart causing the engine to break away from the fuselage and the aircraft to go out of control. His copilot successfully bailed out but by the time Brookley attempted to leave the doomed aircraft he was too low of altitude and his parachute did noy fully deploy.

=== World War II ===
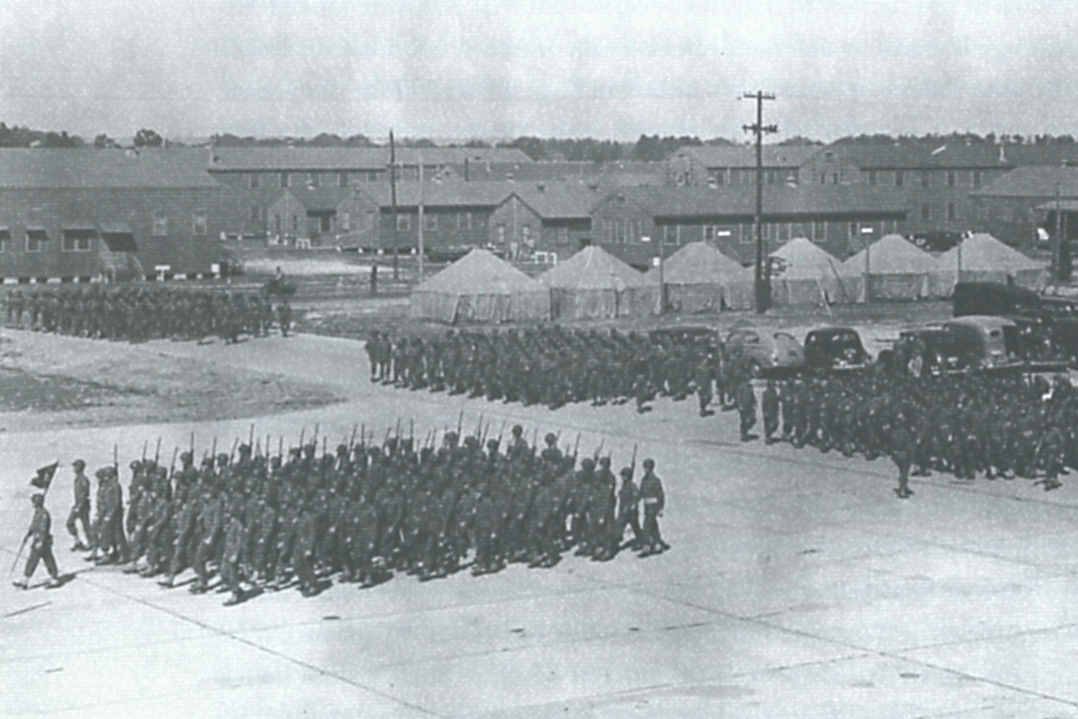
World War II scene at Brookley Field

During World War II, Brookley Field became the major Army Air Forces supply base for the Air Materiel Command in the southeastern United States and the Caribbean.

Many air depot personnel, logisticians, mechanics, and other support personnel were trained at Brookley during the war. Both Air Materiel and Technical Services Command organized mobile Depot Groups at Brookley, then once trained were deployed around the world as Air Depot Groups, Depot Repair Squadrons, Quartermaster Squadrons, Ordnance Maintenance, Military Police, and many other units whose mission was to support the front-line combat units with depot-level maintenance for aircraft and logistical support to maintain their operations. Air Transport Command operated large numbers of cargo and passenger aircraft from the base as part of its Domestic Wing.

During the war, Brookley became Mobile's largest employer, with about 17,000 skilled civilians capable of performing delicate work with fragile instruments and machinery. In 1944, the Army decided to take advantage of Brookley's large, skilled workforce for its top-secret "Ivory Soap" project to hasten victory in the Pacific. The project required 24 large vessels to be re-modeled into Aircraft Repair and Maintenance Units that had to be able to provide repair and maintenance services to B-29 bombers, P-51 Mustang, Sikorsky R-4, and amphibious vehicles.

The Air Force delivered 24 vessels to Mobile, Alabama, in spring 1944 to start conversion as a part of the top-secret Operation Ivory Soap. Six Liberty ships were converted into shops to repair aircraft. They were designated Aircraft Repair Units, Floating and were equipped to repair planes as big as the B-29 Stratofortresses. Eighteen smaller ships were outfitted as Aircraft Maintenance Units. They were made to repair fighter aircraft. About 5,000 men underwent a complex training process that prepared them to rebuild the vessels and operate them once on the water. By the end of the year, the vessels departed Mobile for the Philippines and the Marianas.

One of the keys to Allied victory in Europe was the Norden bombsight, which enabled bomber squadrons to target Germany's war-making industry and infrastructure much more accurately. The military repaired and calibrated the bombsights at Brookley in a secret facility, still standing and in use today.

In 1944 with the closure of the Army contract flying school at nearby Bates Field, Air Transport Command operations were shifted to Bates to alleviate runway traffic at Brookley. Late in 1945 Bates Field was returned to civil control and ATC operations returned to Brookley.

=== Postwar use ===
Following World War II and the creation of an independent United States Air Force, the installation became Brookley Air Force Base. In 1947 with the closure of Morrison Field, Florida, the C-74 Globemaster project was moved to Brookley. The C-74 was, at the time, the largest military transport aircraft in the world. It was developed by Douglas Aircraft after the Japanese attack on Pearl Harbor. The long distances across the Atlantic, and especially the Pacific Ocean to the combat areas indicated a need for a transoceanic heavy-lift military transport aircraft.

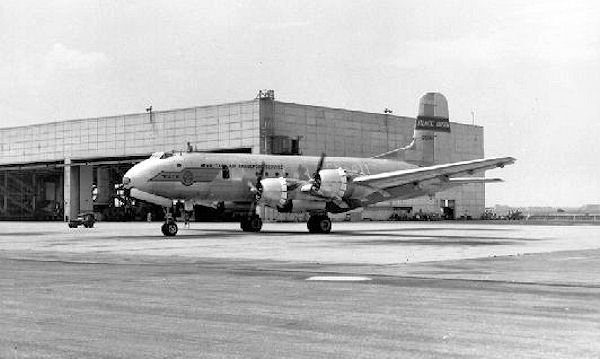
1701st Air Transport Wing Douglas C-74 Globemaster at Brookley AFB in the early 1950s

The "C-74 squadron" (later 521st Air Transport Group, 1701st Air Transport Wing), Air Transport Command operated two squadrons of C-74 Globemasters from Brookley from 1947 until their retirement in 1955. The eleven aircraft were used extensively for worldwide transport of personnel and equipment, supporting United States military missions. They saw extensive service supporting the Berlin Airlift and the Korean War being used on scheduled MATS overseas routes through the late 1940s and mid-1950s. Additionally, logistic support flights for Strategic Air Command (SAC), and Tactical Air Command (TAC) saw the Globemaster in North Africa, the Middle East, Europe, the Caribbean, and within the United States. Two C-74s were used to support the first TAC Republic F-84 Thunderjet flight across the Pacific Ocean to Japan. SAC also continued to use the Globemasters to rotate Boeing B-47 Stratojet medium bombardment groups on temporary duty in England and Morocco. The C-74s were retired in 1955 due to lack of logistical support. The 1701st ATW flew strategic airlift missions on a worldwide scale with its C-124 Globemaster II fleet after the retirement of the C-74 until 1957 when Military Air Transport Service moved out of Brookley AFB and the base came under the full jurisdiction of Air Materiel Command.

In 1962, the Air Materiel Command was renamed as the Air Force Logistics Command (AFLC) and Brookley AFB became an AFLC installation and the host base of the modification and repair center's successor organization, the Mobile Air Materiel Area (MOAMA).

After an immediate end to many of the wartime jobs of World War II, the base's civilian workforce again expanded to around 16,000 people by 1962, a result of both the Cold War and other USAF base closings in other areas of the country. During this time, AFLC's Mobile Air Materiel Area (MOAMA) provided depot-level maintenance for various USAF aircraft of the period including the C-119 Flying Boxcar, C-131 Samaritan, F-84 Thunderstreak, RF-84 Thunderflash, F-102 Delta Dagger, F-104 Starfighter and F-105 Thunderchief.

In 1964, the Air Force Reserve 908th Tactical Airlift Group moved to Brookley from Bates Field. It operated C-119 Flying Boxcar transports.

=== Closure and Controversy ===
On November 19, 1964, the Department of Defense announced a progressive reduction in employment and the eventual closure of Brookley Air Force Base. The costs of the escalation of the Vietnam War was cited as the primary reason for the closure. Moves such as these eventually led to Secretary of Defense Robert McNamara becoming very unpopular both with Congress and with the public. Military bases were sources of employment and federal dollars for states and local communities which allowed them to handle the cost and sales to military people stationed at the base. Moreover, McNamara worked for President Lyndon B. Johnson, who had a well-known reputation for handsomely rewarding friends and severely punishing opponents. When McNamara began the base closure announcements and Brookley was on the list, suspicion immediately began that Johnson personally picked Brookley to close as retribution (albeit retaliation) for the recent 1964 Presidential Election. The Republican candidate, Senator Barry Goldwater, carried Alabama in the election and it was highly believed that Johnson was punishing the state for defecting from its traditional Democratic Party ties.

The closing announcement came as a shock to both local residents employed at Brookley as well as enlisted personnel stationed there. Most were quick to blame Johnson and McNamara for playing politics as well as their seemingly cavalier attitudes over the fallout from it. McNamara steadfastly denied politics played any part in the decision to close Brookley citing the closure of other Air Force bases also on the same list. Instead, he claimed he had another agenda as he wanted to curb the Air Force's reliance on large aircraft in favor of long-range missiles and closing maintenance facilities such as Brookley was a way to do that. However, many former Brookley employees and Mobile residents even to this day still dismiss that as just a made-up cover story to mask Johnson's vengeance, especially since most of the operations simply packed up, moved from Brookley and continued at other Air Force bases including Maxwell AFB in Montgomery. The fact Brookley was also the only Air Force base with a seaport as well as having its own railyard making it logistically unique further didn't support McNamara's reasoning.

Another purported contributor to the demise of Brookley was when First Lady Lady Bird Johnson visited Alabama by train on "The Lady Bird Express" on October 9, 1964. Upon arrival in Mobile and other surrounding Alabama towns she was given a rather cold tepid reception and met with multiple boos, protests as well as several people holding up "Goldwater for president" signs. Many believed this infuriated her husband and was another catalyst that led to Brookley's closure.

The reserve 908th TAG was moved to Maxwell AFB, Alabama in April. Almost immediately after Johnson left office on January 20, 1969, some state and city of Mobile officials tried to reverse the closure of Brookley but the incoming Nixon Administration confirmed the closure as a way to save money because of the Vietnam War. Brookley officially closed its doors for good in June 1969 and was turned over to the state, Brookley AFB represented the largest base closure in U.S. history up to that time, eliminating an estimated 13,000 jobs (10% of Mobile's workforce) which provided an annual payroll of $95 million ($816 million in 2024) to the local economy.

=== Major USAF units assigned ===
- 1701st Air Transport Wing
- 1703d Air Transport Group
- 908th Tactical Airlift Group
- 26th Weather Squadron

=== Post-military use ===
After closure, the base was returned to the City of Mobile. Later, the city transferred it to the Mobile Airport Authority, and it became known as the Mobile Downtown Airport. The city had created the Mobile Airport Authority in 1982 to oversee the operation of the Mobile Regional Airport and what would become the Mobile Aeroplex at Brookley. The Mobile Airport Authority is autonomous and is not a part of the city or Mobile County. The Authority's five board members are appointed by Mobile's mayor, approved by the Mobile City Council, and serve six-year terms.

Following a catastrophic Hurricane Katrina striking New Orleans, first responders from across the Southeast and beyond, came to help. Among them was a team of 30 special agents from the U.S. Bureau of Alcohol, Tobacco, Firearms & Explosives (ATF) who made camp in a dorm on Brookley grounds for the entire month of September 2005. Mobile and most of southern Alabama having been spared the worst of her fury, extensive flooding did occur throughout the city. Once all gun stores and explosive storage sites were secured, the ATF team turned its attention to the three southern-most, coastal counties in Mississippi. Coordinating with other federal, State, and local officials operating from a command post in Gautier, Mississippi, the team assisted law enforcement and national guard personnel in Biloxi, Pascagoula, Gulfport, and elsewhere along the I-10 corridor.

Airbus currently has an aircraft final assembly line at Brookley, producing the Airbus A320 series airliners. Airbus had previously attempted to enter the market at Brookley Field when its military division EADS partnered with Northrop Grumman to produce the KC-45, billed as the next generation of air refueling and cargo aircraft for the US Air Force as a replacement to the aging fleet of KC-135s. EADS/Northrop Grumman originally won the contract bid to produce the aircraft, but the plans were put in limbo after rival Boeing filed a protest over the bidding process. In 2011, Boeing was declared the winner of the rebidding.

== In popular culture ==
In the 1977 film Close Encounters of the Third Kind, the entire landing strip complex behind Devils Tower was actually constructed and filmed in an abandoned aircraft hangar at the former Brookley AFB.

In the 2001 documentary "The Making of Close Encounters of the Third Kind" director Steven Spielberg referred to Brookley as a former US Air Force "dirigible base" but no dirigible airships were ever maintained or stored at Brookley while it was under US Air Force control.

== See also ==
- Alabama World War II Army Airfields
