= Douglas C-74 Globemaster =

US military transport aircraft with 4 piston engines, 1945

C-74 Globemaster
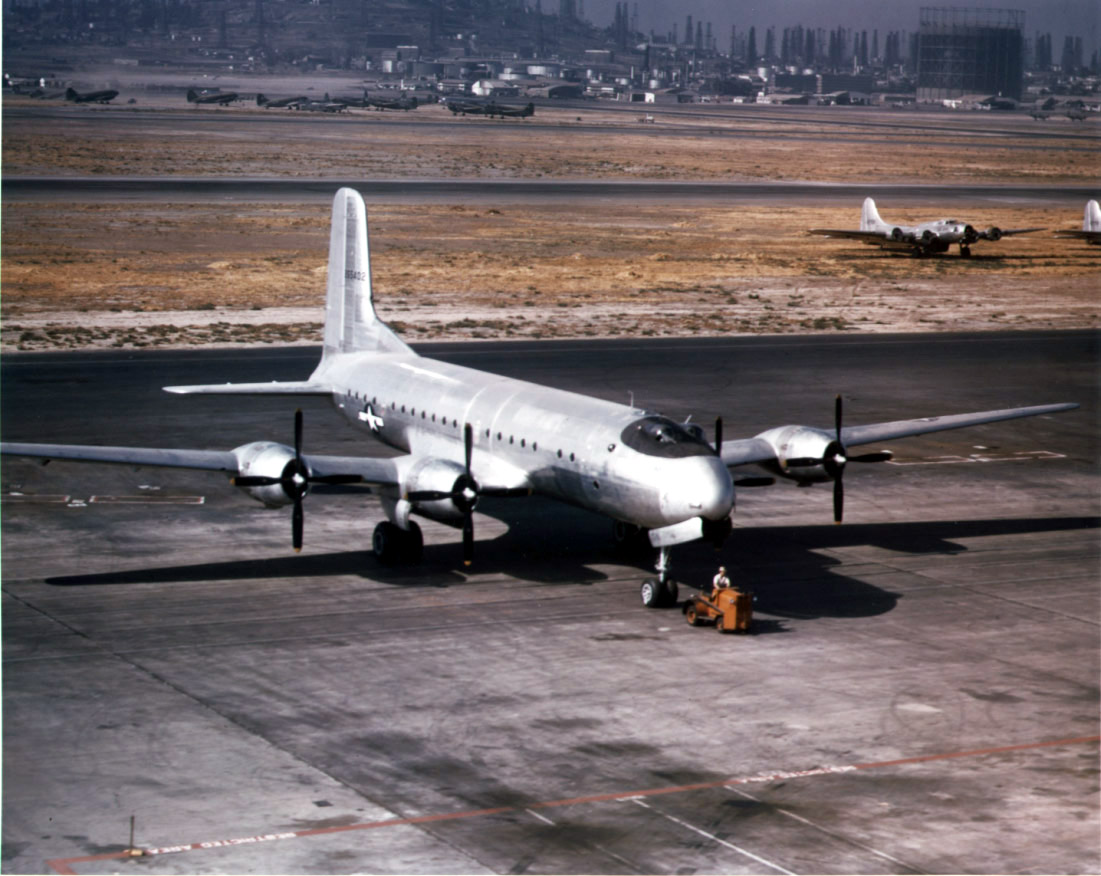
- C-74 Globemaster in Long Beach, California

General information
- Type: Strategic airlifter
- Manufacturer: Douglas Aircraft Company
- Status: Retired – 1959 (military), 1969 (civilian)
- Primary users: United States Army Air Forces United States Air Force
- Number built: 14 (one converted to C-124 prototype)

History
- Manufactured: 1945–1947
- First flight: 5 September 1945
- Retired: 1969 (last operational flight)
- Developed into: Douglas C-124 Globemaster II

The Douglas C-74 Globemaster was a United States heavy-lift cargo aircraft built by the Douglas Aircraft Company in Long Beach, California. The aircraft was developed after the Japanese attack on Pearl Harbor. The long distances across the Atlantic and, especially, Pacific oceans to combat areas indicated a need for a transoceanic heavy-lift military transport aircraft. Douglas Aircraft Company responded in 1942 with a giant four-engined design. Development and production modifications issues with the aircraft caused the first flight to be delayed until 5 September 1945, after both V-J Day (marking the end of conflict in World War II, on August 15, 1945) and formal surrender on September 2. Total production was limited to 14 aircraft when the wartime contract was cancelled in January 1946.

Although not produced in large numbers, the C-74 did fill the need for a long-range strategic airlifter, in which capacity the subsequent Douglas C-124 Globemaster II was used by the Air Force for many years.

== Design and development ==
The Douglas Aircraft Company began studies at their Santa Monica division in early 1942 for a transport capable of fulfilling the global logistical needs of the U.S. military. Its "C-74 Project Group" used their company's DC-4 as a basis and concentrated on enlarging its capabilities. The group's design philosophy was to build a "no-frills" aircraft able to accommodate much of the Army's large equipment including light tanks, two 105-millimeter (4.1 in) howitzers with their towing vehicles, two angle bulldozers, and smaller utility vehicles. This became the Douglas Model 415 and a cost-plus contract worth more than $50 million was signed 25 June 1942 for 50 aircraft and one static test article. The resulting production aircraft was 31 ft (9.4 m) longer than the C-54 Skymaster, and would be 24 ft (7.3 m) longer than the proposed C-118 Liftmaster; no experimental XC- or YC-74 models were produced.

This first flight of a C-74 occurred at 15:09 hrs. on 5 September 1945 at Long Beach with Ben O. Howard at the controls and lasted 79 minutes. The first C-74, 42-65402, was airborne just two months after it rolled off the assembly line. At the time of its first flight, the C-74 was the largest landplane to enter production, with a maximum weight of 172,000 lb (78,000 kg). It was able to carry 125 soldiers or 48,150 lb (21,840 kg) of cargo over a range of 3,400 mi (5,500 km). Perhaps the most notable feature of the C-74 was its cockpit arrangement with separate canopies over the pilot and copilot; the same arrangement was used for the XB-42 Mixmaster. This arrangement was unpopular with flight crews, however, and the aircraft were retrofitted with a more conventional arrangement. During the life of the aircraft, the radial engines were also upgraded to 3,250 hp (2,420 kW) Pratt & Whitney R-4360-49 engines.

The second built, 42-65403, c/n 13914, crashed during flight testing on 5 August 1946 at Torrance, California, when it lost a wing during an overload dive test. All four crew bailed out successfully. The fourth aircraft was diverted to a static test article at Wright Field, Ohio, and virtually every major structural component was tested to destruction between August 1946 and November 1948. This was done in order to determine the individual components' ability to withstand design loads. The fifth C-74 built was modified to be a prototype for the C-124 Globemaster II, which used the same wing as the C-74, but used a much larger fuselage. This newer aircraft quickly superseded the C-74 in service.

Douglas had every intention to adapt the aircraft into a civil airliner once the war ended. Pan American World Airways began negotiations in 1944. Their civilian model would be dubbed a DC-7 by Douglas (Model 415A) and the 'Clipper Type 9' by Pan American. Pan American intended to use the 108-passenger aircraft for international travel between New York, Rio de Janeiro, and other cities. The major difference between the military cargo aircraft and the civil airliner was the non-pressurized fuselage of the military C-74 and the pressurized DC-7. The passenger compartment was to be outfitted with a lounge bar, dining area and sleeping cabins for night flights. In June 1945, an order was placed for 26 DC-7 aircraft.

With the need for military aircraft greatly reduced by the end of World War II, the order for 50 military aircraft was canceled in January 1946 after production of only 14 aircraft. This cancellation also ended plans to build an airliner version of the C-74 for the civilian market, as the limited military production run increased the cost per civilian aircraft to over $1,412,000 and Pan American canceled its order. Douglas then canceled the DC-7 designation. The DC-7 designation was later used for a completely different civilian airliner project in the early 1950s, having no relationship to the C-74.

== Operational history ==
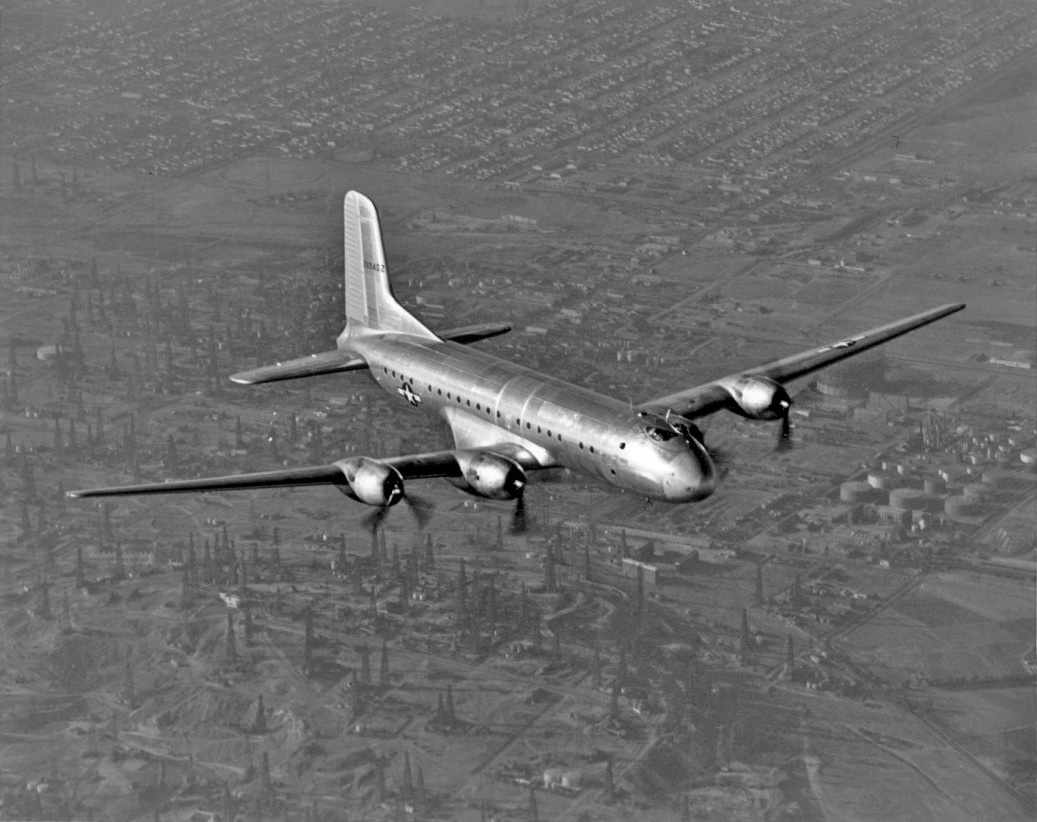
C-74 Globemaster over Long Beach, California, October 1945

Of the 14 Globemasters built, 11 actually saw operational service. All were used by the United States Army Air Forces Air Transport Command (ATC), and later by the United States Air Force Military Air Transport Service (MATS).

The C-74 had a crew of five, including pilot, copilot, radio operator, navigator, and flight engineer. Crew rest quarters were included for long-duration missions. Passageways were provided in the wing to permit the flight engineer to perform servicing and repairs while in flight. It could carry 125 fully equipped troops, 115 litter patients with their medical attendants, or up to 50,000 lb (22,700 kg) of cargo. The cargo bay had twin hoists that could be moved on a rail up and down the bay. They could be used to drop a removable belly section to ease loading of cargoes, reducing the need for specialized cargo handling equipment.

The small numbers of C-74s built meant that the aircraft's service was limited, but it gave the Air Force experience with the operation and utility of large transport aircraft.

=== Service introduction ===
The "C-74 squadron" was activated along with the "C-74 Project" on 5 September 1946. They were attached to the 554th AAF Base Unit located at Memphis Municipal Airport, Tennessee. The 554th was a part of the USAAF Air Transport Command. The C-74 Squadron's mission was:

- To conduct non-scheduled, nonstop flights from Fairfield-Suisun (Later Travis Air Force Base) to Washington, D.C. The flights would be cargo only, no passengers were authorized.
- To establish a flight program which would accumulate 300 hours of service time on the Globemaster's original R-4360-27 engines in the shortest possible time
- To gather and record all technical data from tests performed on the C-74
- To train sufficient crew members and aircraft mechanics with which to conduct these tests. The R-4360 engine was earmarked for the B-35 and B-36 so Air Materiel Command was especially anxious to see the results of the squadron's use of the aircraft.
- Establish loading techniques and procedures
- Establish proper tie-down procedures.
- Establish air evacuation techniques.
- Determine other data concerning loading, offloading of cargo.

This project was designed to be a "shakedown" of the aircraft prior to entering operational service. Training of personnel to conduct this test was to have been accomplished by aircrews and technicians initially C-74 trained at Wright Field, Ohio, and also at the Douglas facility in Long Beach, California. Approximately 30 transcontinental flights were planned.

The squadron was moved to Morrison Field, Florida in October 1946. This was due to the fact that the runways at Memphis were not stressed to take the large gross weight of the C-74, resulting in some minor cracking to the concrete surface. Operations included two weekly trips from Morrison Field to Albrook Field, Panama using Río Hato Army Air Base as an alternate field.

In 1947, the 2nd and 3rd Air Transport Groups (Provisional) were formed and the C-74 was declared operationally ready. Humanitarian missions were flown in 1947 that included flood relief to Florida, and Hurricane relief for the southern area of the U.S.

=== MATS operations ===
Morrison Field was inactivated on 1 July 1947, and both provisional units were inactivated, the aircraft and support personnel and equipment being reassigned to Brookley Field, Alabama. On 1 June 1948, the Military Air Transport Service (MATS) was formed with the merging of the Air Force's Air Transport Command and the Navy's Naval Air Transport Service. Within MATS, all of the Globemasters were assigned to the Atlantic Division.

Once in operational use, C-74s began to be used on scheduled MATS overseas routes through the late 1940s and mid-1950s:

- "Panamanian", between Brookley AFB, Alabama and Albrook AFB, Panama
- "Puerto Rican", between Brookley AFB and Ramey AFB, Puerto Rico
- "Hawaiian", between Brookley AFB and Hickam AFB, Hawaii, with a stop at Fairfield-Suisun (later Travis) AFB, California.
- "Johnathan", between Brookley AFB, Kelly AFB, Texas; McClellan AFB, California; McChord AFB, Washington, and Elmendorf AFB, Alaska.
- Brookley AFB and Casablanca-Anfa Airport, French Morocco; Wheelus Air Base, Libya
- Brookley AFB and Keflavik Airport, Iceland; RAF Manston, England.

Additionally, logistic support flights for Strategic Air Command (SAC), and Tactical Air Command (TAC) saw the Globemaster in North Africa, the Middle East, Europe, the Caribbean, and within the United States. Two C-74s were used to support the first TAC Republic F-84 Thunderjet flight across the Pacific Ocean to Japan. SAC also continued to use the Globemasters to rotate Boeing B-47 Stratojet medium bombardment groups on temporary duty in England and Morocco as part of Operation Reflex.

=== Berlin Airlift ===
During the Berlin Airlift, a single Globemaster (42-65414) arrived at Rhein-Main Air Base on 14 August 1948 and landed for the first time on 17 August at Berlin's Gatow Airfield in the British sector carrying 20 tons of flour. Over the next six weeks, the Globemaster crew flew 24 missions into the city delivering 1,234,000 lb (559,700 kg) of supplies. Several airlift records were set by the crew in 414 during Operation Vittles. On 18 September, Air Force Day, the crew flew six round trips into Berlin hauling a total of 250,000 lb (113,400 kg) of coal setting a new Airlift Task Force utilization record by flying 20 hours during the 24-hour effort.

During the construction of Tegel Airfield in the French sector of Berlin, large construction equipment was needed to build new runways. But this equipment, including a rock crusher, was too big for even the Globemaster to accommodate. The mission was accomplished by having the equipment cut into pieces by welding torch at Rhein-Main and flown aboard the C-74 into Gatow for reassembly.

After six weeks of Vittles flights, the Globemaster returned to Brookley AFB. Reportedly, the Soviet Union complained that the Globemaster could be used as a bomber via the open elevator well. The fact that the runways in Berlin were not stressed for the airlifter's weight and the aircraft was not compatible with the corridor's scheduling were other factors considered for its withdrawal.

Support for the Berlin Airlift by the C-74 changed to flying regularly scheduled flights between the U.S. and Western Germany. This mission was called the "Goliath" and was constantly transporting C-54 engines and parts for use in the airlift. Cargo arriving in Western Germany was flown to Berlin in smaller C-47 Skytrain and C-54 Skymaster aircraft.

Experience with the Berlin Airlift demonstrated that the new United States Air Force needed a heavy strategic airlift capability, which led to the development of the Douglas C-124 Globemaster II.

=== Korean War ===
The invasion of the Republic of Korea by North Korea began another supporting phase of the C-74's career. From 1 July–December 1950, the Globemasters logged over 7,000 hours in flights to Hawaii hauling troops and high priority cargo west toward the Korean War and returning eastward with wounded GIs.

During the seven months between July 1950 and January 1951, the Globemasters transported 2,486 patients, 550 passengers, and 128,000 lb (58,100 kg) of cargo from Hickam AFB, Hawaii to the U.S. mainland while hauling just under a million pounds of cargo westward. The C-74s did not fly into Japan, Okinawa or any South Korean airfields. These figures, coupled with the fact that, since 1946, the C-74 had flown over six million miles and 31,000 flying hours without a single injury to crewmen or passengers, give testimony to the Globemaster's reliability.

=== Retirement ===
By 1952, the C-74 began to experience shortages of spare parts and increasing maintenance problems. It was recognized by late 1954 that the deterioration of the C-74's components was progressing more rapidly than predicted. Plans were made for the eventual retirement of the Air Force's only fleet of Globemasters. In June 1955, the 6th ATS was merged with the 3rd ATS and was flying operational missions with them. On 1 July, the 6th ATS (Heavy) was inactivated and its C-74s and crews were transferred to the 1703rd ATG's 3rd ATS (Heavy). On 1 November 1955, the C-74s were placed in flyable storage at Brookley AFB while the group waited for instructions as to the disposition of the aircraft.

During the first three months of 1956, the 11 remaining C-74s were officially removed from the Military Air Transport Service's inventory and were flown one by one to Davis-Monthan AFB, Arizona for long-term storage and disposition. Colonel George S. Cassady, who had accepted the first C-74 for the Air Force and who was by then a Brigadier General, was attending a Continental Division Commander's Conference when he learned of the C-74's last flight. Cassady received permission to pilot the aircraft on its last flight and on 31 March 1956, flew the last C-74 from Brookley AFB to Davis-Monthan AFB.

Most of the C-74s in storage at Davis-Monthan AFB were scrapped in 1965, although four ended in civilian hands, mostly owned by Aeronaves de Panama (holding company for "Air Systems"). The National Museum of the United States Air Force scrapped the last vestige of Air Force Globemasters when they relegated the YC-124C, 48-795 (the prototype of the Globemaster II which had been converted from C-74, 42-65406) to fire-fighting training in 1969.

- 42-65404 was sold on the civilian market as N3182G. Later operated by Aeronaves de Panama as HP-385 in Europe and the Middle East crashing near Marseille on 9 October 1963, with six on board killed. After the crash, Aeronaves de Panama's licence to operate from Denmark was withdrawn, and the airline went out of business. A layman's account of travel on aircraft 42–65404, christened 'Heracles' by its owners, in the months before its fatal crash is offered by veterinarian/author James Herriot who was on board the aircraft. In monitoring the health of a cargo of 40 pedigree Jersey cattle cows and heifers from Gatwick/London to Istanbul on 8–9 August 1963, he noted its bald tires, worn instruments, jammed loading hoist and undercarriage which did not properly retract. The starboard inboard engine caught fire en route to Istanbul, and the crippled aircraft barely cleared the Alps on a return trip to Copenhagen for repairs. In October 1963, 42-65404 collided with the top of a low hill five miles after takeoff from Marseille with the loss of all her crew.
- 42-65408 was sold on the civilian market on 24 March 1959 as N8199H, owned by Akros Dynamic. It was flown to Cuba in an attempt to sell it to the new Castro government. It later was moved to Panama as Aeronaves de Panama HP-367. It flew in Europe and to Middle East frequently. Abandoned after the airline went out of business in 1963, and dismantled at Milan, Italy in August 1972; it was the last surviving Globemaster.
- 42-65409 was sold on the civilian market in 1956 as N3181G. After reconditioning at Oakland, California, it was operated by Aeronaves de Panama as HP-379 in Europe and the Middle East. It flew from Europe to the Middle East frequently carrying live cattle from Copenhagen to the Middle East. It was abandoned at Milan, Italy in 1969 and appeared in the 1969 Michael Caine movie The Italian Job. It was painted in the colors of the fictitious Communist Chinese Civil Aviation Airlines that delivered the gold to FIAT in Turin. Later moved to Turin airport, it caught fire while on public display on 11 June 1970 and again on 24 September 1970 while it was being salvaged, this time killing two salvage workers.

None of the Aeronaves de Panama C-74s ever came to Panama. Instead they were intended for cattle flights from Copenhagen. For a detailed account of these operations, read Flying Cowboys by Tad Houlihan.

- 42-65412 was sold on the civilian market in 1956 as N3183G, but was dismantled at Long Beach, California in 1964.

=== C-74 production ===
Serial #	Produced	Retired
42-65402	October 1945	October 1954
42-65404	July 1946	May 1954
42-65406	September 1946	September 1954
42-65407	February 1946	July 1954
42-65408	September 1946	October 1954
42-65409	January 1947	October 1954
42-65410	March 1946	March 1954
42-65411	December 1946	September 1953
42-65412	February 1947	October 1954
42-65413	February 1947	February 1954
42-65414	March 1947	February 1954
42-65415	April 1947	January 1954

42-65416 through 42-65451 cancelled

== Operators ==
The following USAAF/USAF units flew the C-74 Globemaster:

United States

- United States Air Force

== Specifications (C-74) ==
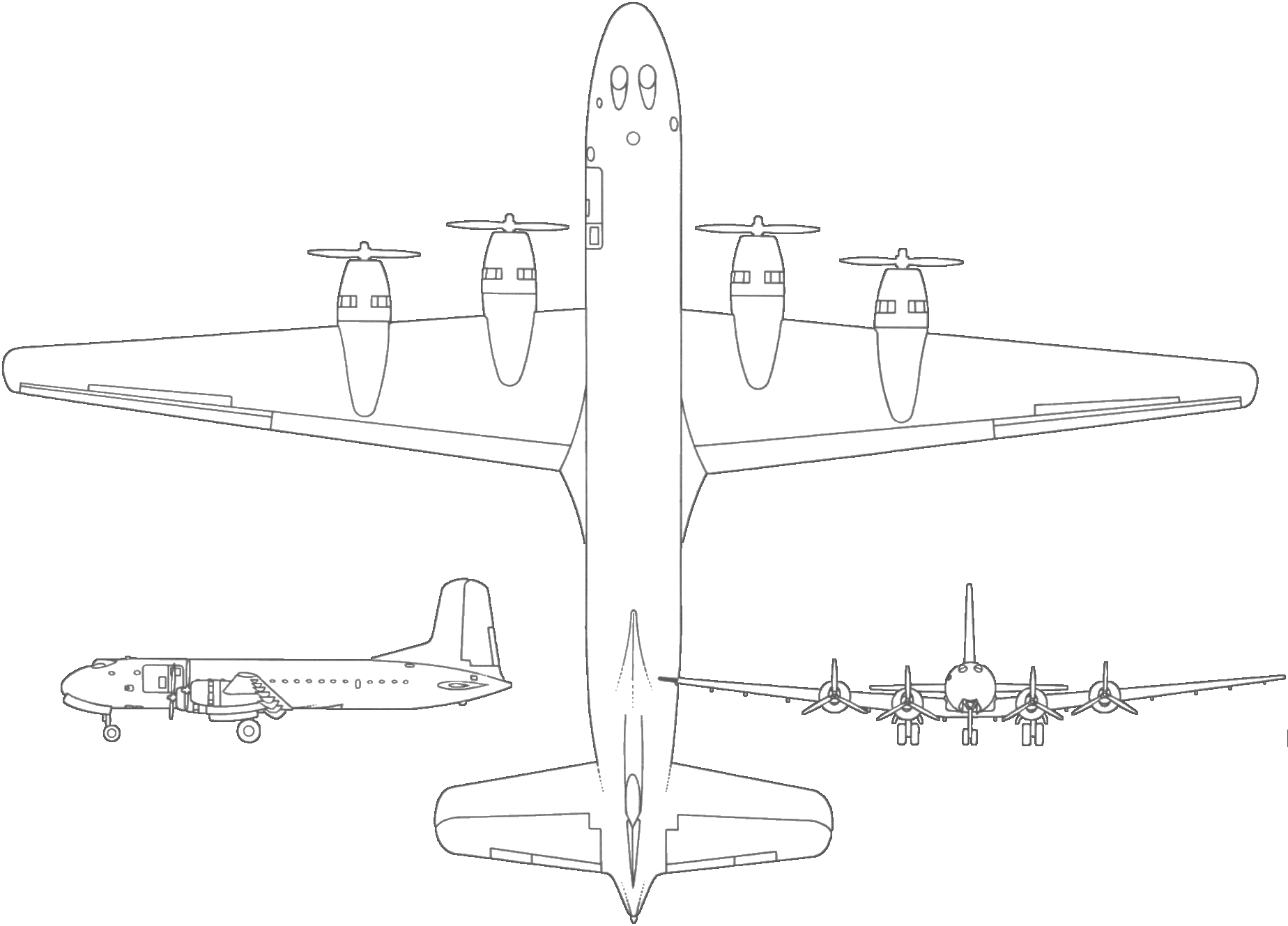
3-view line drawing of the Douglas C-74 Globemaster

Data from Jane's all the World's Aircraft 1949–50, McDonnell Douglas aircraft since 1920 : Volume I

General characteristics

- Crew: 13
- Capacity: 125 troops, 115 stretchers with medical staff, or up to 48,150 lb (21,840 kg) of cargo
- Length: 124 ft 1.5 in (37.833 m)
- Wingspan: 173 ft 3 in (52.81 m)
- Height: 43 ft 9 in (13.34 m)
- Wing area: 2,510 sq ft (233 m^{2})
- Empty weight: 86,172 lb (39,087 kg)
- Gross weight: 154,128 lb (69,911 kg)
- Max takeoff weight: 172,000 lb (78,018 kg)
- Fuel capacity: 11,000 US gal (42,000 L; 9,200 imp gal) in six centre-section integral tanks
- Powerplant: 4 × Pratt & Whitney R-4360-69 Wasp Major /-29s /-49s 28-cylinder air-cooled 4-row radial piston engines, 3,250 hp (2,420 kW) each
- Propellers: 4-bladed Hamilton-Standard or Curtiss-Electric fully-feathering, reversible constant-speed propellers

Performance

- Maximum speed: 328 mph (528 km/h, 285 kn) at 10,000 ft (3,000 m)
- Cruise speed: 212 mph (341 km/h, 184 kn)
- Range: 3,400 mi (5,500 km, 3,000 nmi)
- Ferry range: 7,250 mi (11,670 km, 6,300 nmi)
- Service ceiling: 21,300 ft (6,500 m)
- Rate of climb: 2,605 ft/min (13.23 m/s)
- Wing loading: 61.4 lb/sq ft (300 kg/m^{2})
- Power/mass: 0.084 hp/lb (0.138 kW/kg)

== See also ==
Related development

- Douglas C-124 Globemaster II – American heavy lift military aircraft with 4 piston engines, 1946

Related lists

- List of military aircraft of the United States
