= Sookerating Air Force Station =

Air Force base in Assam, India

Air Force Station Sookerating एयर फोर्स स्टेशन सूकेरटिंग
- IATA: none; ICAO: VESK

Summary
- Airport type: Military
- Operator: Indian Air Force
- Location: Sookerating, India
- Elevation AMSL: 400 ft / 122 m
- Coordinates: 27°33′10.30″N 095°34′14.34″E

Map

Runways
Direction	Length		Surface
Direction	ft	m	Surface
03/21	6,595	2,010	Asphalt

Air Force Station Sookerating is an Indian Air Force base located at Sookerating in the state of Assam, India. It is a secondary airport for the Indian Air Force, which operates much more actively from other air bases in the region..

During World War II, the airfield was used as a transport base by the United States Army Air Forces Tenth Air Force and Air Transport Command. From the airfield, numerous C-46 Commando aircraft flew north into China over "the Hump" to resupply Allied forces. The airfield was also used as a combat fighter airfield in 1942 to defend the Assam Valley against Japanese forces advancing from Burma.
