= Chabua Air Force Station =

Air Force base in Assam, India

Chabua Air Force Station

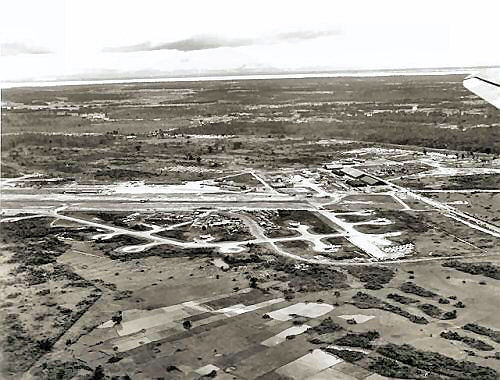
- The base in 1944
- IATA: none; ICAO: VECA

Summary
- Airport type: Military
- Operator: Indian Air Force
- Location: Chabua, Assam, India
- Elevation AMSL: 367 ft (112 m)
- Coordinates: 27°27′44″N 095°07′05″E

Map
- Location of Chabua Air Force Station, India VECA (India)

Runways
| Direction | Length | | Surface |
| Direction | m | ft | Surface |
|---|---|---|---|
| 05/23 | 2,744 | 9,003 | Asphalt |

Chabua Air Force Station near Arunachal Pradesh

Chabua Air Force Station (ICAO: VECA) is an Indian Air Force base located at Chabua of Dibrugarh district in the state of Assam, India.

== History ==
=== US Air Force ===
This base was built in 1939. During World War II it was a major supply point for the ferrying of supplies to Generalissimo Chiang Kai-shek's forces in and around Kunming, China. This was known as "Flying the Hump".

The Japanese occupation of Burma in 1942 had cut off the Burma Road, the last land route by which the Allies could deliver aid to the Chinese Government of Chiang Kai-shek. Until the Burma Road could be retaken and the Ledo Road completed, the only supply route available was the costly and dangerous route for transport planes over the Himalayas between India's Assam Valley and Kunming, China. This route became known as the Himalayan Hump or simply The Hump.

Operated initially by the United States Army Air Forces Ferrying Command (later Air Transport Command) China Ferrying Command (later ATC India China Wing), the 1st Ferrying (later Transport) Group operated three squadrons of C-47 Skytrain and C-46 Commando aircraft from Chabua. The airfield was also an important layover stop of the ATC Karachi-Kunming air transport route. Flights operated west to Agra Airport, Willingdon Airfield (New Delhi), Gaya Airport, Assam (Borjhar Airport) and east into Dali Airport, and Kunming (Wujiaba Airport) in China.

While the route kept the transports relatively free from enemy attack (enemy action destroyed only seven aircraft, killing 13 men) it led over rugged terrain, through violent storms, with snow and ice at the higher altitudes the planes flew over the mountains. Flying the Himalayan Hump would turn out to be some of the most dangerous flying in the world. Over the course of action there were 460 aircraft and 792 men lost. Still, the operations were a success. There were 167,285 trips that moved 740,000 tons of material to support Chinese troops and other Allied forces.

In addition to the ATC transport units, elements of the Tenth Air Force 380th Bombardment Group, 375th Bombardment Squadron operated B-24 Liberators from the airfield, flying long range bombardment missions into Burma, south China, Thailand (Bangkok) and well as French Indochina (Haiphong). A total of 8 B-24s were lost. Also the B-24s were used to ferry aircraft fuel into China.

== Indian Air Force ==
The airfield was abandoned after World War II. IAF commenced operations from this airfield in 1962 amid increased tensions with China and following the annexation of Tibet by the People's Republic of China. Initially Dakotas and Vampires, later Hunters, Otters and Mi-4 helicopters commenced air operations from Chabua air base. In the mid-seventies, subsequent to the runway upgradation and renovation.

=== Squadrons ===
No. 102 Squadron IAF

No. 14 Wing

== See also ==
- Air Transport Command
