= Champollion (disambiguation) =

Jean-François Champollion (1790–1832) was a French classical scholar, the decipherer of Egyptian hieroglyphs and a founding figure in the field of Egyptology.

Champollion may also refer to:

== People with the surname ==
- Jacques Joseph Champollion-Figeac (1778–1867), French archaeologist and brother of Jean-François
- Eugène-André Champollion (1848–1901), French engraver and illustrator
- Yves Champollion, creator of Wordfast

== Other ==
- Champollion (spacecraft), a planned cometary rendezvous and landing spacecraft
- Champollion (crater), a lunar crater
- Champollion: A Scribe for Egypt, a French documentary film
- Institut national universitaire Champollion or Jean-François Champollion University Center for Teaching and Research, a French university
- Le Champo or Le Champollion, cinema named for the street
- Rue Champollion, street in Paris' Quartier de la Sorbonne
- SS Champollion, French ocean liner built in 1925 and sunk in 1952
