= Operation Matterhorn logistics =

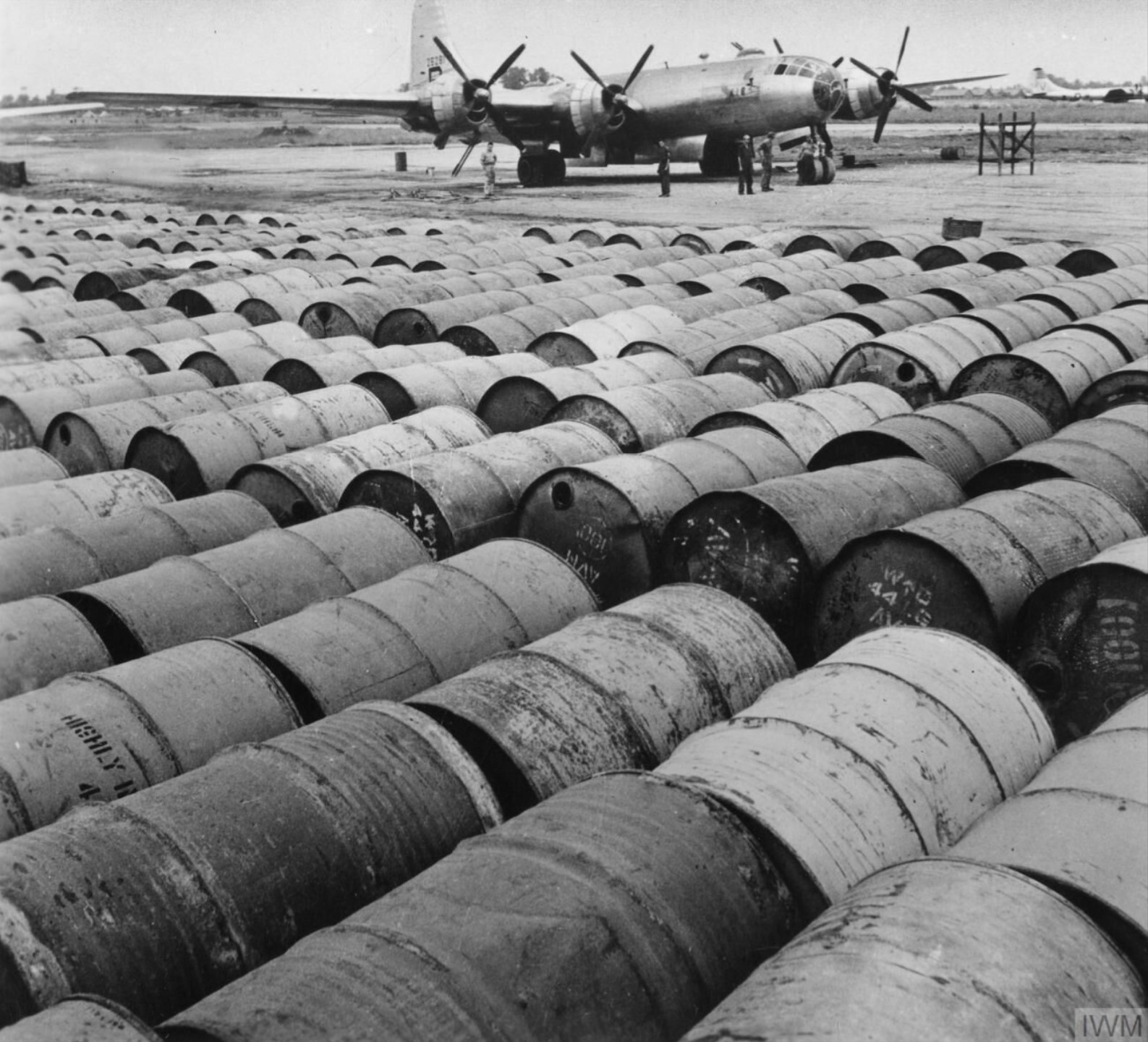
Rows of fuel drums in front of B-29 Superfortress 42-6281 Heavenly Body in China. This aircraft was abandoned in Laohokow after the mission to Omura on 25 October 1944.

Operation Matterhorn was a military operation of the United States Army Air Forces in World War II involving the strategic bombing of industrial facilities in Japan, China and Southeast Asia by Boeing B-29 Superfortress bombers. The creation and maintenance of bases for the B-29s in India, Ceylon and China was a logistical undertaking of enormous magnitude and difficulty.

The B-29s were based in India but staged through bases around Chengdu in China's Sichuan province. Operations were conducted from China because no other sites within range of Japan were in Allied hands in early 1944. Since the Japanese had cut the Burma Road in 1942, the only line of communications with China was over "the Hump", as the air ferry route to China was called. All the fuel, ammunition and supplies used by American forces in China had to be flown in over the Himalayas.

The B-29s required airbases with runways that were longer and stronger than those of smaller bombers. Five airfields in Bengal in India were upgraded to take them.Supplying fuel by rail would have placed too much strain on the railways, so a fuel pipeline to the airfields was laid from the port of Calcutta. The four B-29 airbases around Chengdu, along with five airstrips for fighters to defend them, were built by tens of thousands of Chinese laborers with hand tools. In November 1944, American bombers began raiding Japan from the Mariana Islands, and the B-29s left the logistically difficult and increasingly vulnerable bases in China in January 1945.

== Background ==
The Boeing B-29 Superfortress was one of the largest aircraft of World War II. It was also the most expensive military project: the $3 billion cost of design and production (equivalent to $54 billion in 2025), far exceeded the $1.9 billion cost of the Manhattan Project. It sported state-of-the-art technology, including a pressurized cabin and an analog electromechanical computer-controlled fire-control system, and was powered by four 2,200-horsepower (1,600 kW) Wright R-3350 Duplex-Cyclone radial engines. The large number of advanced features resulted in more than the usual number of problems and defects associated with a new aircraft. This was compounded by efforts to fast track its introduction into service. The Wright R-3350 Duplex-Cyclone engines in particular gave a lot of trouble, and were prone to catching on fire.

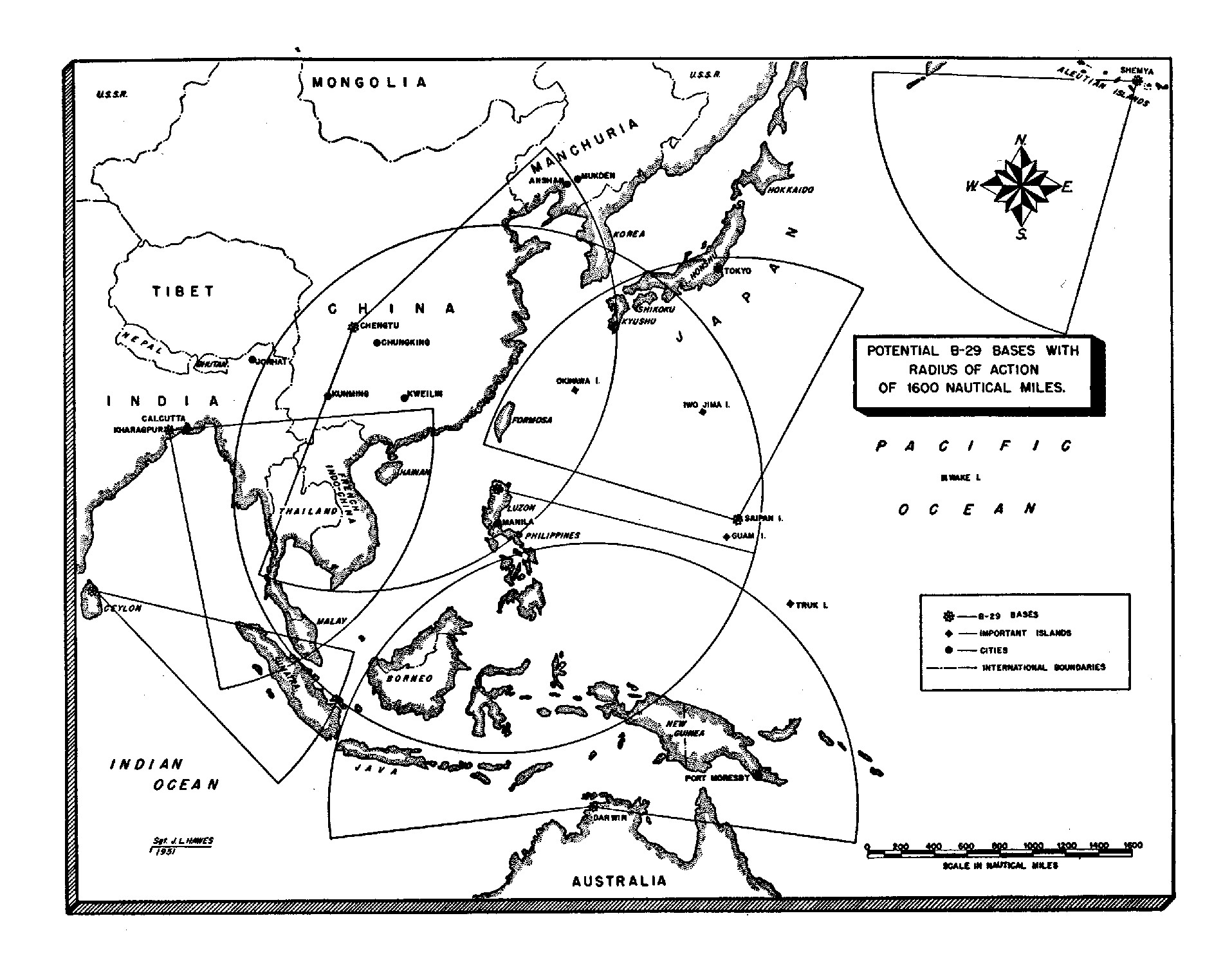
Potential bases for the B-29 bombers

In April 1943, the commander of the United States Army Air Forces (USAAF), General Henry H. Arnold, set up a special B-29 project under Brigadier General Kenneth B. Wolfe. Colonel Leonard F. Harman became his deputy. For his assistant chief of staff for operations (A-3), Wolfe secured Brigadier General LaVerne G. Saunders, who had been awarded the Navy Cross in the Guadalcanal campaign.

To control the B-29s, the 58th Bombardment Wing was activated on 1 June. A senior formation, the XX Bomber Command was activated in Salina, Kansas, on 27 November 1943, with Wolfe as its commander, and Harman became the commander of the 58th Bombardment Wing. To avoid the B-29s being misused on the battlefields instead of against the Japanese home islands, the Joint Chiefs of Staff approved the establishment of the Twentieth Air Force on 4 April 1944 under Arnold's command. The XX Bomber Command became part of the Twentieth Air Force. The role of the theater commanders was restricted to providing logistical support and the defense of the B-29's bases.

The high cost of the B-29 program put Arnold under pressure to produce results. He wanted the B-29s used to attack strategic industrial targets in Japan. The basing of the Superfortresses in China was raised at the January 1943 Casablanca Conference. No other locations within range of Japan were in Allied hands or expected to be so in 1944. Moreover, because the war against Germany had priority, it was considered essential to keep China in the war against Japan until Germany was defeated and the Allies could redeploy forces to the Pacific. This had political implications, and the President of the United States, Franklin D. Roosevelt, was a staunch supporter of aid to China. The basing of the B-29s in China therefore received his endorsement.

Logistical support for operations in India and China was through the port of Calcutta, which was estimated to be able to handle the additional 596,000 short tons (541,000 t) per month. After the Japanese cut the Burma Road in March 1942, the only line of communications with China was over "the Hump", as the air ferry route over the Himalayas was called. Until the Burma Road could be reopened by the ground forces, it was the only source of fuel, ammunition and supplies for the China-based American Fourteenth Air Force and Lend-Lease aid to the Chinese ground forces. This involved flying over the world's tallest mountain range in treacherous weather conditions and with the possibility of interception by Japanese fighters.

The Matterhorn plan called for supplies to be flown from India to China in Consolidated B-24 Liberator bombers converted to Consolidated C-87 Liberator Express transport aircraft. It was estimated that 200 C-87 flights would be required to support each VLR bomber group, with 2,000 C-87s in operation by October 1944 and 4,000 by May 1945. Five missions per group per month could be flown, with 168 group-months believed to be sufficient to destroy all targets in Japan within twelve months. The Matterhorn plan was formally approved at the Second Cairo Conference in December 1943, with a target date of 1 May 1944.

== Base development ==
=== India ===
==== Airbases ====
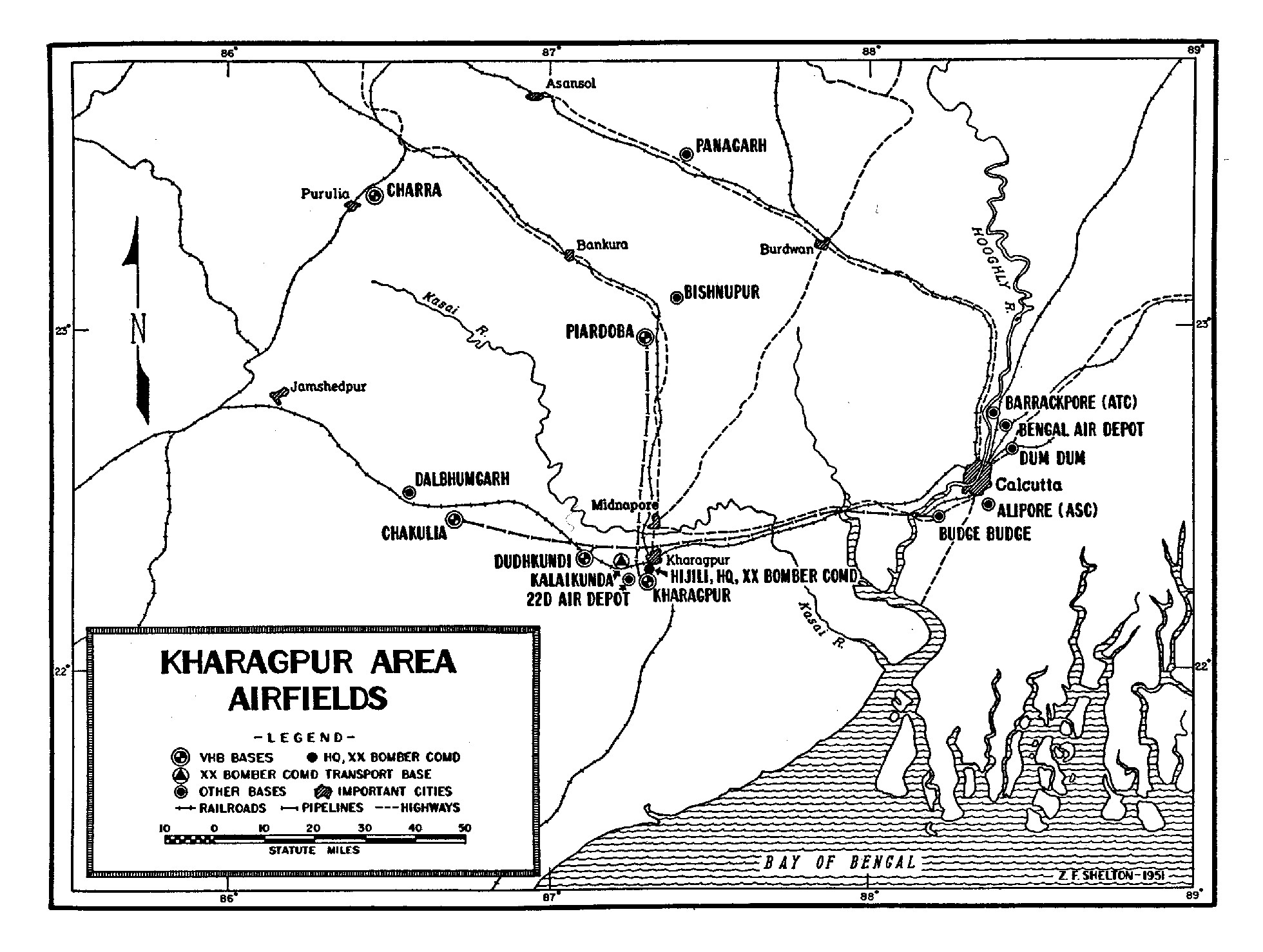
Kharagpur area airfields

A team headed by Brigadier General Robert C. Oliver, the commander of the China–Burma–India Theater (CBI) Air Service Command, began inspecting potential sites for B-29 bases in August 1943. The B-29's 141-foot (43 m) wing span was considerably wider than the 104-foot (32 m) of the Boeing B-17 Flying Fortress], the next largest aircraft in the inventory, and a fully-laden B-29 weighed about 70 short tons (64 t), nearly twice as much as a B-17. The Twentieth Air Force asked for B-29 runways to be 8,500 feet (2,600 m) long and 200 feet (61 m) wide, nearly twice the area of a 6,000-by-150-foot (1,829 by 46 m) B-17 runway. The plan was to enlarge and improve five existing runways in the flatlands west of Calcutta to bring them up to B-29 standards. Five airfields were selected on 17 November: Bishnupur, Piardoba, Kharagpur, Kalaikunda and Chakulia. Wolfe's advance party from the XX Bomber Command inspected the fields in December, and they accepted all but Bishnupur, for which Dudhkundi was substituted.

Work was to be carried out by U.S. Army engineer units with imported materials and local labor. Company A of the 653rd Topographic Battalion surveyed the sites to determine how the airfields could be constructed. In order to get the runways operational as soon as possible, the airmen were persuaded to temporarily accept runways 7,500 feet (2,300 m) long and 150 feet (46 m) wide. Lieutenant Colonel Kenneth E. Madsen was in charge of the construction of the air bases; Colonel William C. Kinsolving, a petroleum engineer, had the task of laying two four-inch (100 mm) pipelines to the airfields. They reported to Colonel Thomas Farrell, who headed the CBI Construction Service.

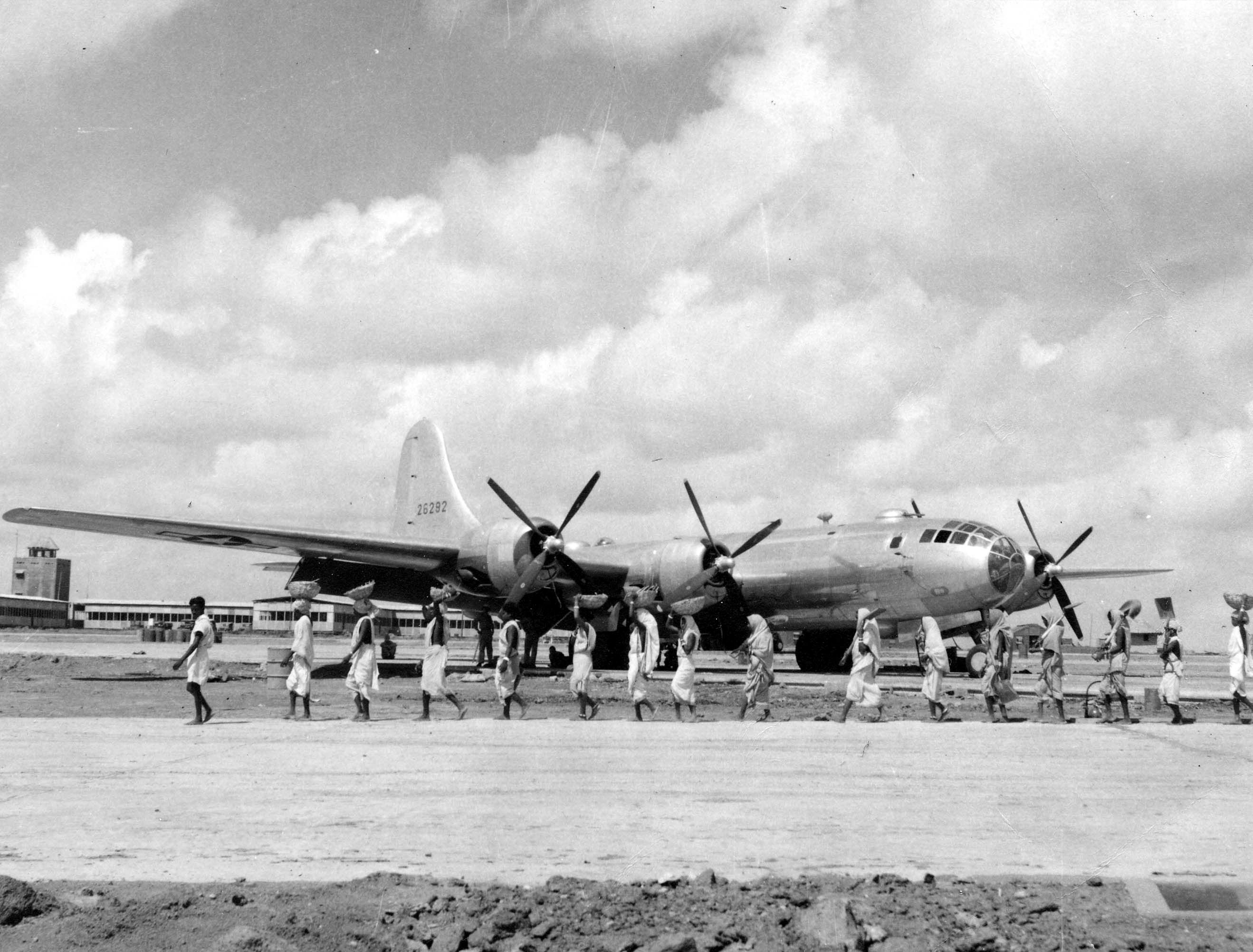
B-29 Superfortress 42-6292 Black Jack of the 678th Bomb Squadron, 444th Bombardment Group, at Charra Airfield, India

Each air base would require four months' work by an engineer aviation battalion. In order to meet the April deadline, the engineer units should have been in place by December, but they were still in the United States. The CBI theater commander, Lieutenant General Joseph W. Stilwell, gave them priority for shipping, and they set out on a convoy that sailed on 15 December. Travelling via North Africa, they reached India in February 1944. In the meantime, local contractors and 300 trucks were borrowed from the engineer-in-chief of the British Eastern Command.

The delay in sending the engineer units threatened to upset the entire Matterhorn timetable. On 16 January 1944, Stilwell diverted the 382nd Engineer Construction Battalion from working on the Ledo Road to working on Kharagpur. It deployed by air, taking over equipment on site. The 853rd Engineer Aviation Battalion arrived in the theater on 1 February and was set to work on Chakulia. It had lost more than half its personnel en route when HMT Rohna, the ship it was traveling from Algiers to India on, was sunk by a Luftwaffe radio-controlled bomb off Sicily on 26 November 1943. Units from the 15 December convoy began arriving in mid-February. The 930th Engineer Regiment was assigned to Kalaikunda, the 1875th Engineer Aviation Battalion to Dudhkundi, the 1877th Engineer Aviation Battalion to Chakulia and the 879th Engineer Aviation Battalion (Airborne) to Piardoba. As an airborne unit, the 879th was equipped with small, air-portable equipment that was unsuited to airbase work, and it was eventually reassigned.

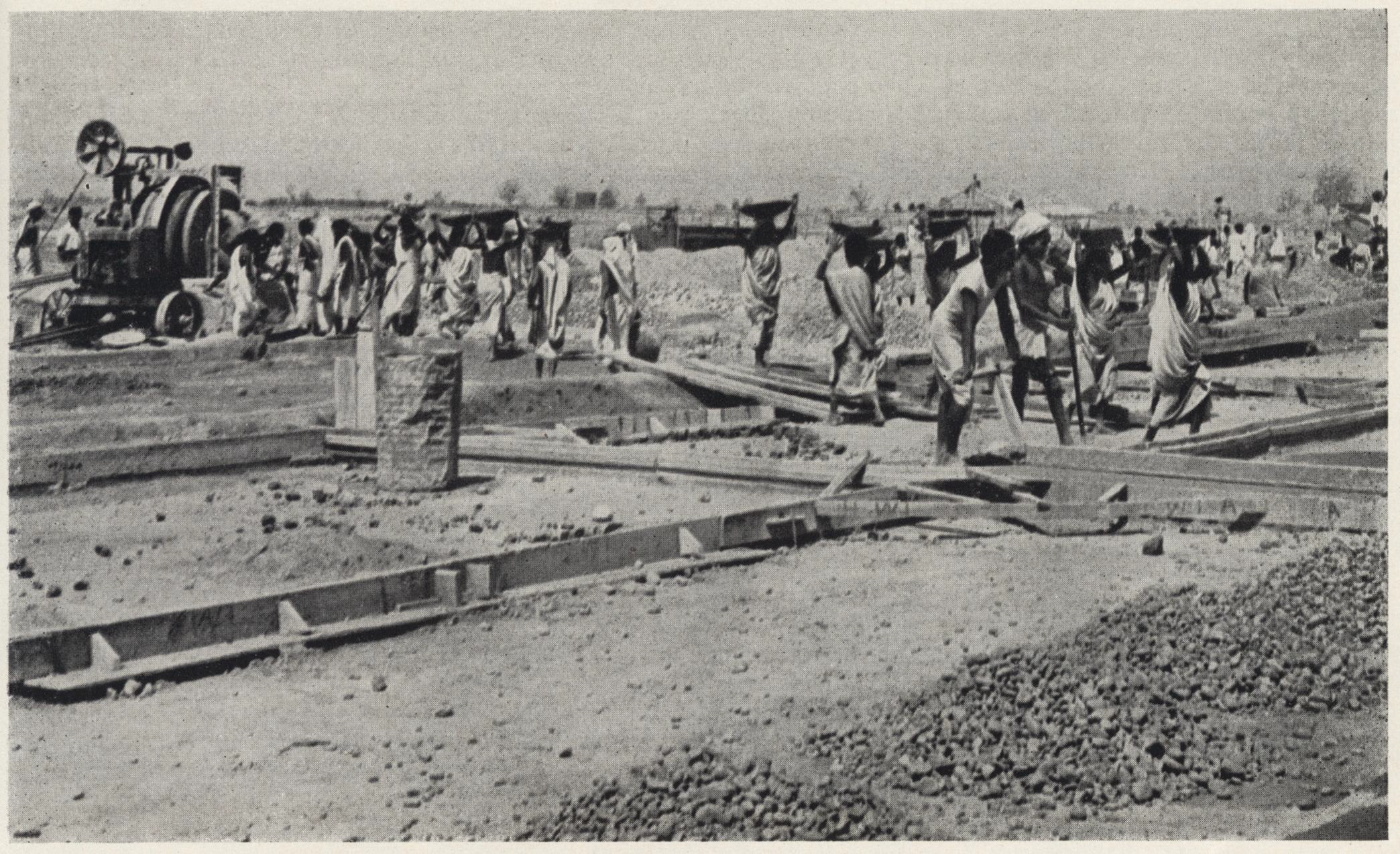
Indian workers carry concrete from mixer to runway on their heads. When U.S. Army engineers arrived and took over these same mixers, they were able to triple the output.

The engineer units worked with borrowed equipment; their own unit equipment did not begin to arrive until 15 April, and was not complete until 30 June. Marshall accepted a proposal from Stilwell and the Supreme Allied Commander of South East Asia Command, Admiral Lord Louis Mountbatten, to divert units earmarked for postponed amphibious operations in Burma to Matterhorn. Accordingly, Marshall assigned the 1888th Engineer Aviation Battalion, which embarked from the West Coast of the United States in February and reached India in mid-April. With its arrival, Madsen had 6,000 engineers and 27,000 Indian civilians under contract from India's Central Public Works Department on the job.

Religious sensibilities meant that seven different types of rations had to be stocked. There were cultural sensibilities that had to be considered as well; at Chakulia, the 1877th Engineer Aviation Battalion assigned rock quarrying and rock screening to both sexes, unaware that the former was regarded as work for men and the latter was considered work for women, resulting everyone walking off the job.

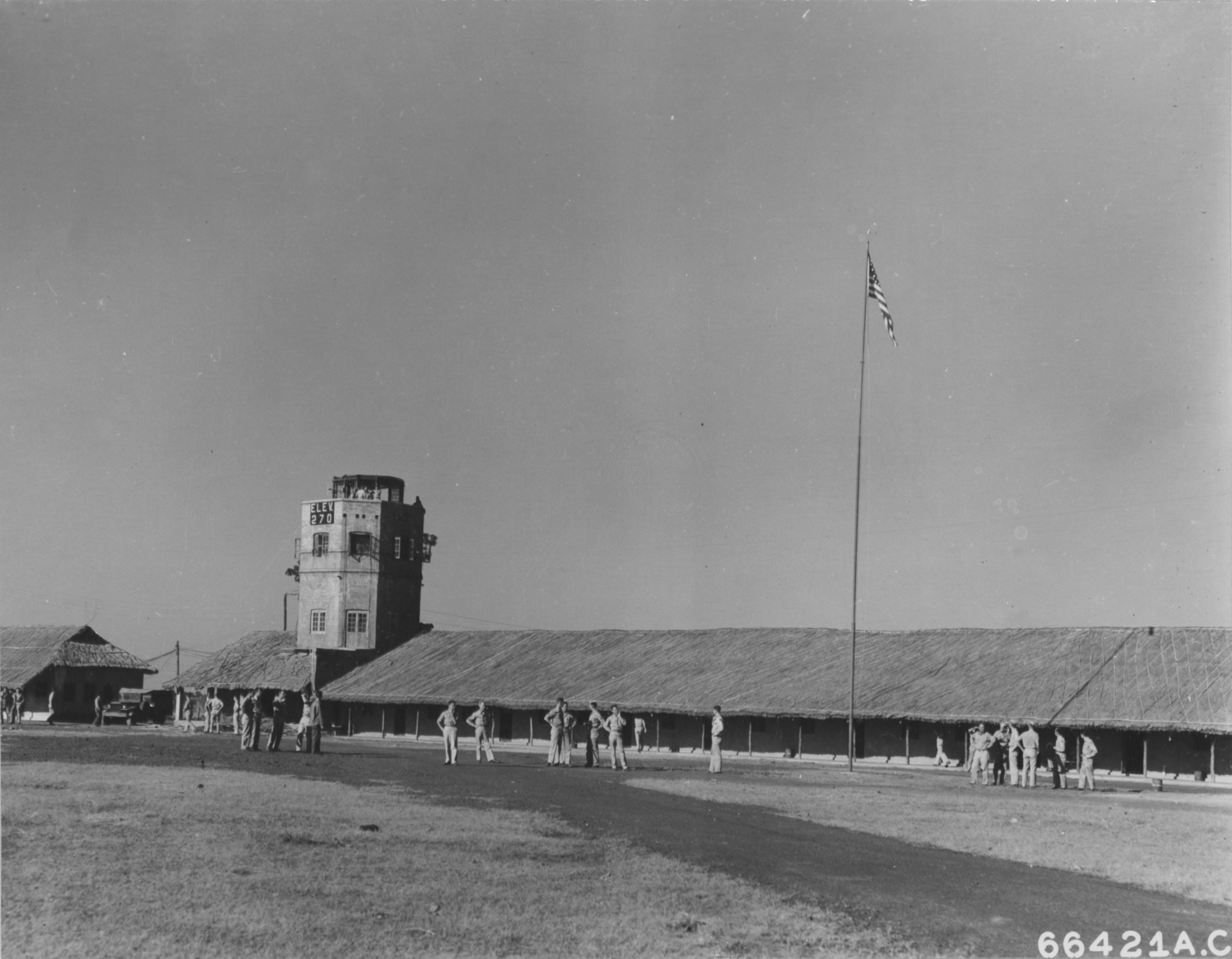
Control tower at a B-29 airbase in India

Grading the runways accounted for more than half of the 1,700,000 cubic yards (1,300,000 m^{3}) of the earth moved. New concrete was laid 10 inches (25 cm) thick; existing runways were overlaid with 7 inches (18 cm) of concrete. While sand was obtained from nearby streams and gravel and crushed basalt construction aggregate were obtained locally, Indian cement was in short supply and of inferior quality, so much of the cement used was imported from the United States. Concrete was produced locally and spread by hand at all the fields except Kalaikunda, where heavy equipment was used. Chevron- and horseshoe-shaped hardstands were provided, as were paved, rectangular parking areas. To save time and concrete, dispersal areas were omitted.

A variety of buildings were provided. At first the troops lived in tents, but later they were housed in native "basha" huts with earth or concrete floors, bamboo or plaster walls and thatched roofs. Basha huts were also used for administrative and technical buildings, along with U.S. prefabricated plywood structures, some of their Italian counterparts that had been captured in the East African campaign, and British Nissen huts. Workshops and hangars were also provided. Most of the utilities such as electricity and water were installed by U.S. Army engineers.

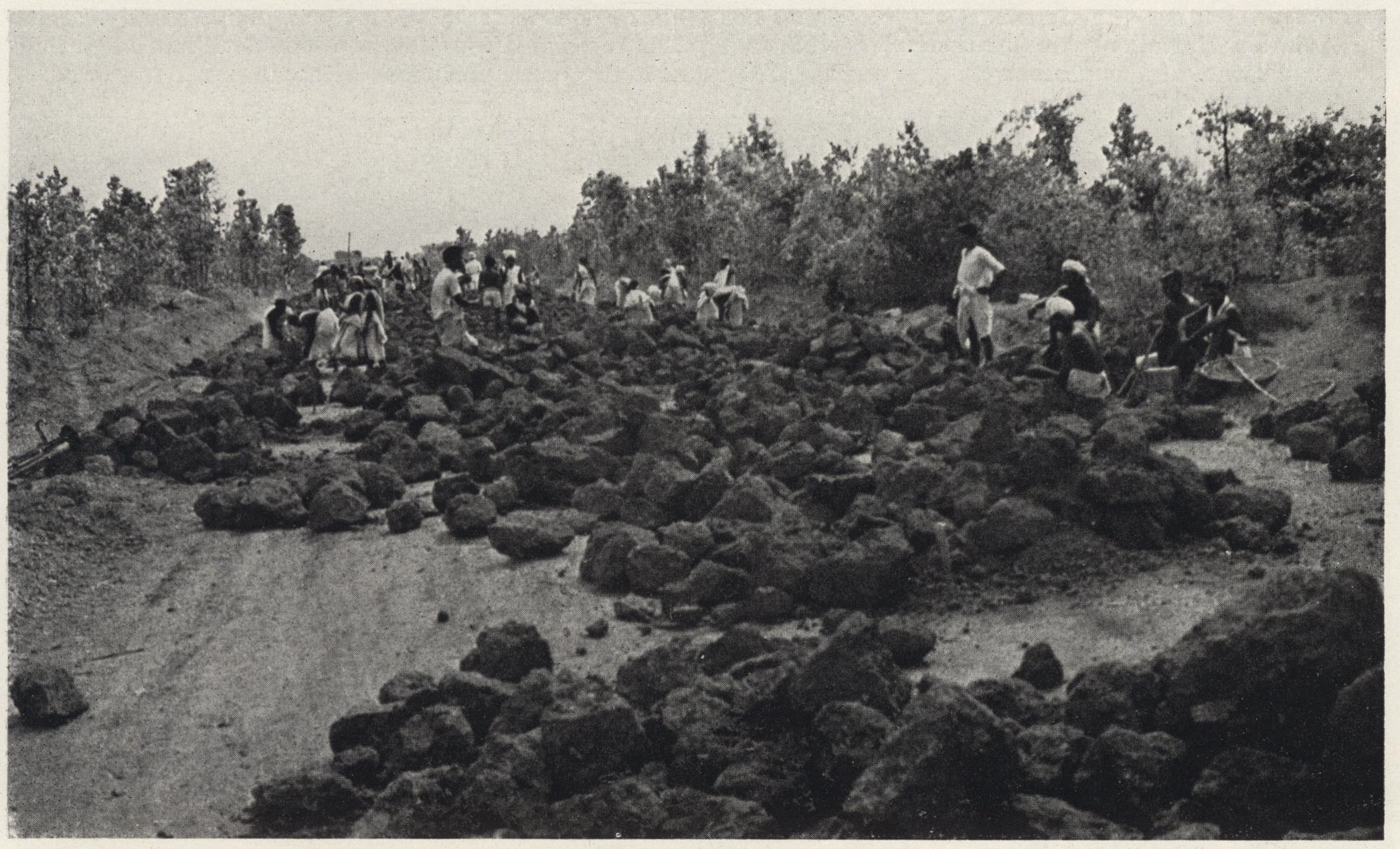
Indian road-builders started with a base of large laterite boulders. Smaller laterite rocks are placed in a layer on top, then a layer of murram. This is covered with road tar and surfaced with pea gravel. Workers are shown here placing and pounding the bottom layer into shape. This road was graded with United States equipment.

Although reports to USAAF headquarters frequently claimed that work was proceeding on schedule, that schedule was far behind the original plans. Works on the airbases were not completed until September. The decision in April to deploy the second wing of B-29s to the Marianas meant that only four groups would be deployed to CBI instead of the originally planned eight, so only the five original airfields were required. Delays in construction at Dudhkundi meant that Charra Airfield had to be used temporarily. The B-24 runway there was extended with Marston Mat to accommodate the 444th Bombardment Group from when it arrived on 12 April until Dudhkundi was ready in July. The total cost of constructing the five airbases was estimated at $20 million (equivalent to $365.78 million in 2025).

==== Pipelines ====
Supplying fuel to the airfields in Bengal by rail would have placed too much strain on the railways, so a fuel pipeline was laid from Calcutta to the airfields. It was estimated that the Matterhorn bases would require 4,736,000 US gallons (17,930,000 L) of fuel in March 1944, 3,536,000 US gallons (13,390,000 L) in April and May, 7,027,000 US gallons (26,600,000 L) in June, 7,077,000 US gallons (26,790,000 L) in July and 10,608,000 US gallons (40,160,000 L) in August. Each airbase was provided with 1,470,000 US gallons (5,600,000 L) of storage.

A Shell Oil terminal at Budge Budge had a tank farm with a capacity of 500,000 barrels (79,000,000 L), of which 300,000 to 400,000 barrels (48,000,000 to 64,000,000 L) were made available to the U.S. Army. The 700th Engineer Petroleum Distribution Company arrived at Kalaikunda on 3 January 1944 and was given the task of laying a six-inch (15 cm) pipeline from Budge Budge to Kharagpur, a distance of about 70 miles (110 km). The 707th and 708th Engineer Petroleum Distribution Companies arrived a few days later and were assigned the task of laying four-inch (10 cm) pipelines from Kharagpur to Chakulia via Dudhkundi and from Kharagpur to Piardoba, respectively. Each four-inch line was about 50 miles (80 km) long.

Pipelines
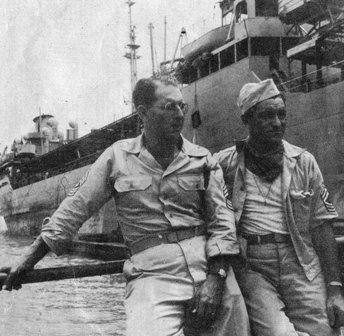
A Navy tanker delivers fuel. The section foreman (right), checks his pumping stations and storage tanks.

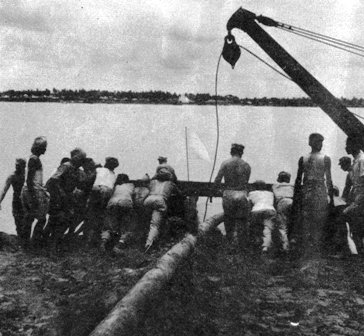
GIs and Indian laborers launch a pontoon on the Hooghly River. Two pontoons lashed together will float pipe to the opposite bank. The main portion of the pipeline will then lie along the river's bottom.

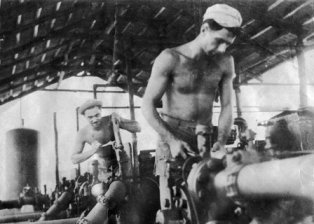
At Budge-Budge, operators work on the 100-octane gasoline pumps.

A major obstacle was the Hooghly River, which had a tidal bore of up to 7 feet (2.1 m) and a current that could reach 25 miles per hour (40 km/h). Heavy pipeline clamps were attached every few joints to hold the pipe in position on the bottom. Laying 5,000 feet (1,500 m) of pipeline across involved scheduling the work for optimal tidal conditions. The pipe was run across with steel cables pulled by large Caterpillar D8 tractors. Three pump stations were established: one at Budge Budge, one at Kharagpur and one halfway between them. The system began pumping gasoline on 13 March 1944. The 707th operated the system, while the 700th and 708th moved on to other projects. All work was completed on 6 October 1944.

Due to a shortage of standard pipe, Farell and Kinsolving decided to use thin, lightweight pipe. Pipes were buried to prevent accidental or deliberate damage in densely populated areas. Local labor was hired to dig the ditches through local contractors, who had never before been involved with a project of this magnitude. "And the contractors' personnel policies, if they can be so dignified," the American official historians noted, "were blends of inefficiency and time-honored skulduggery." The laborers could not work far from their home villages, as no food or housing was available outside them. As construction moved further from Calcutta, it was found to be more efficient to place them on the payroll and supervise them with American engineers. The lightweight pipe was susceptible to corrosion and leaking 100-octane gasoline could be dangerous. On 26 June 1944, a leak was found where the pipe crossed the Hooghly River near the village of Uluberia. Five days later, a vapor explosion set fire to thatched houses in the village. Seventy-one people died in the ensuing conflagration.

=== China ===
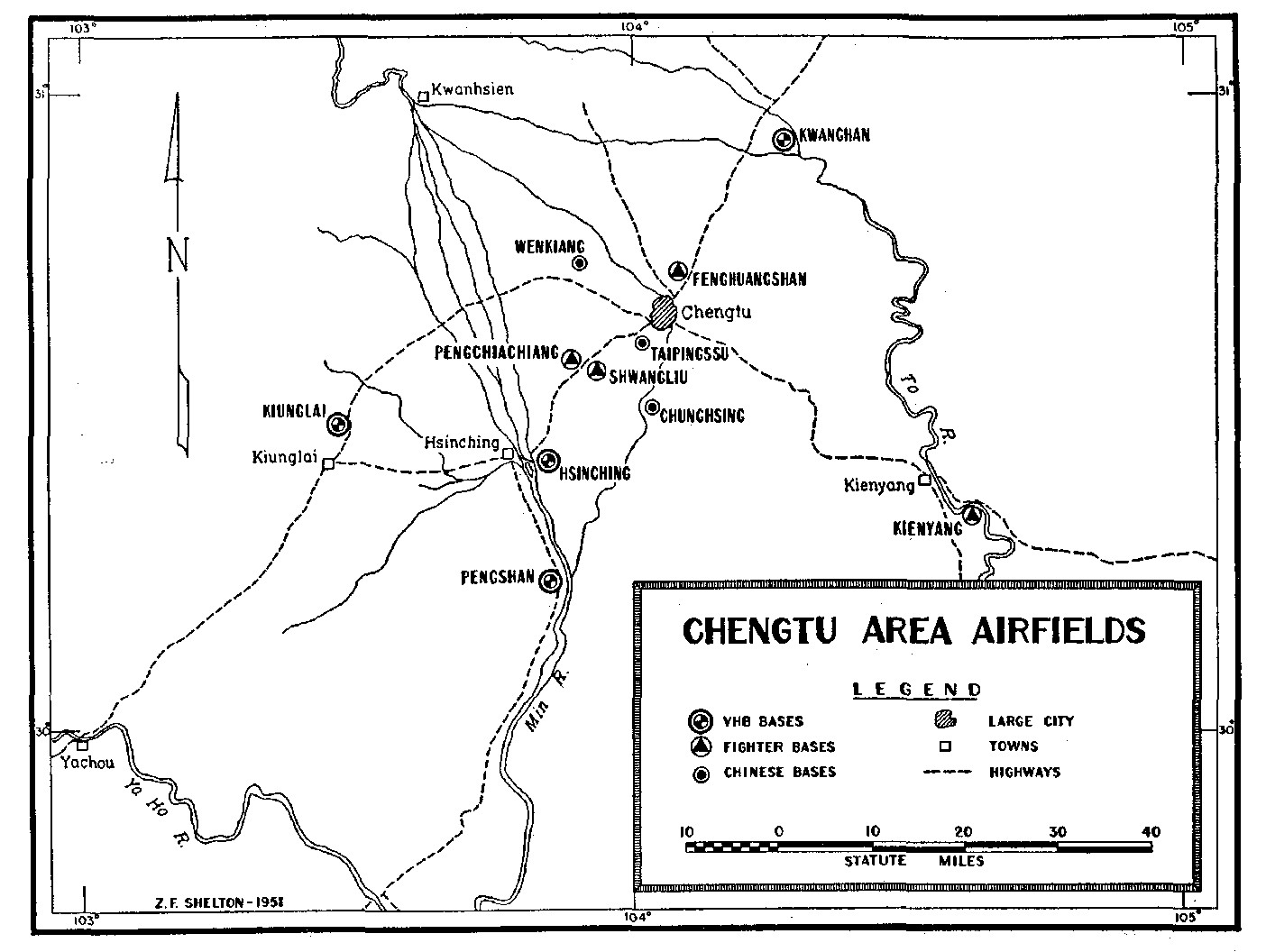
B-29 airfields in the Chengdu area

Lieutenant Colonel Henry A. Byroade was appointed the project engineer responsible for construction of the B-29 airfields in China. He reconnoitered the Chengdu area in November 1943, and in his report on 8 December he selected four B-29 airbase sites, Xinjin, Guanghan, Qionglai and Pengshan, where existing runways could be strengthened and lengthened to accommodate the B-29s. In addition, there were five airstrips for fighters. The Chengdu area was generally flat, which facilitated air base construction, with mild weather, which facilitated both construction and operations. On 16 March 1944, Byroade assumed the dual role of chief engineer of the 5308th Air Service Area Command and chief engineer of the Fourteenth Air Force.

At the Sextant Conference, Roosevelt had promised Chiang that the United States would fully reimburse China for labor and materials expended on Matterhorn. The Chinese estimated that the airbases would cost two to three billion Chinese yuan, around $100 to $150 million (equivalent to $1,400 to $2,100 million in 2024), at least at the official rate of exchange of 20 yuan to the dollar; on the black market an American dollar fetched up to 240 Chinese yuan. Stilwell suspected that half of this sum was in the form of "squeeze" (bribes and commissions), an accepted business practice in China. "One more example", he wrote in his diary, "of the stupid spirit of concession that proves to them that we are suckers."

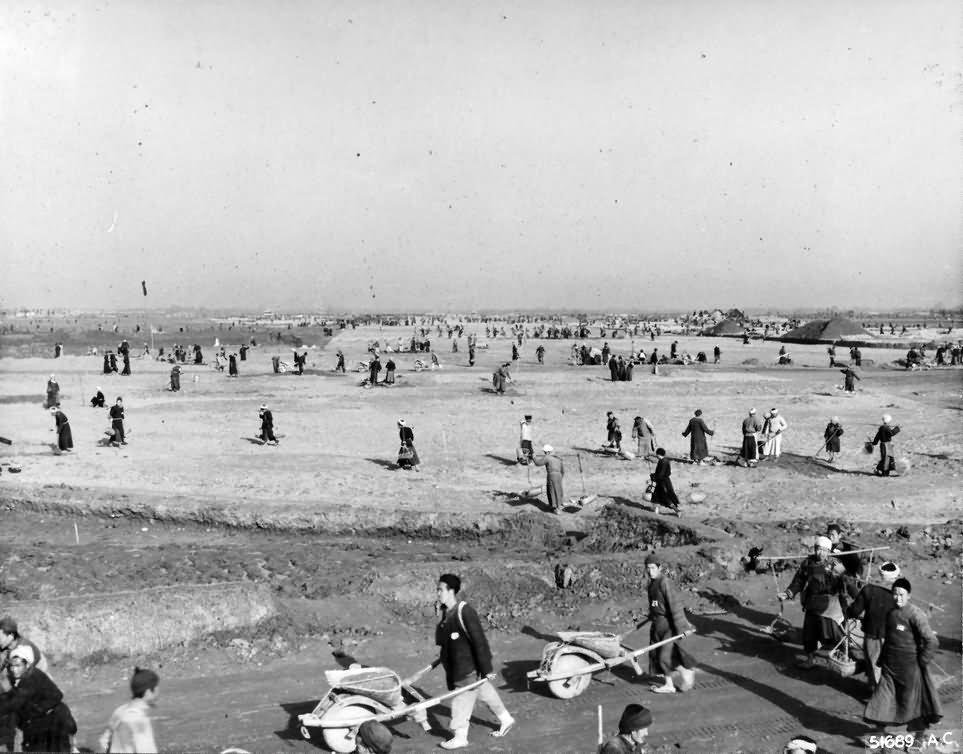
Building B-29 bases in China February 1944

A settlement was reached between the Vice Premier of the Republic of China, Kung Hsiang-hsi, and the United States Secretary of the Treasury, Henry Morgenthau Jr., in June, under which the United States paid China $210 million (equivalent to $3,000 million in 2024), although this included payment for other works in addition to the Chengdu airfields. Arthur N. Young, the American financial advisor to the Chinese government, was critical of the U.S. Army's profligate spending. Price caps were imposed on materials used by contractors, but with limited success. It became necessary to fly banknotes over the Hump. Landowners were inadequately compensated for the loss of their land and the peasants who worked it were not compensated at all. Contract workers were paid on a piecework basis, and averaged about 25 Chinese yuan per day (worth about $18 in 2024). This was barely sufficient to buy food, so many had to be supported by their families. These grievances generated support for the Chinese Communist Party.

The work was the overall responsibility of Zhang Qun, the governor of Sichuan Province. Zeng Yangfu, the head of the Ministry of Transportation and Communications, provided engineering, design and planning support. Construction work was supervised by Lieutenant Colonel Waldo I. Kenerson. Only fourteen U.S. Army engineers were assigned to the project. Their role was limited to drafting specifications, carrying out inspections and administering the work. The Chinese Military Engineering Commission controlled construction. Some 300,000 impressed laborers, including women and children, and 75,000 contract workers were employed on the project. Kenerson found that he had to teach them about soil mechanics, and then supervise them to ensure what he told them was put into practice.

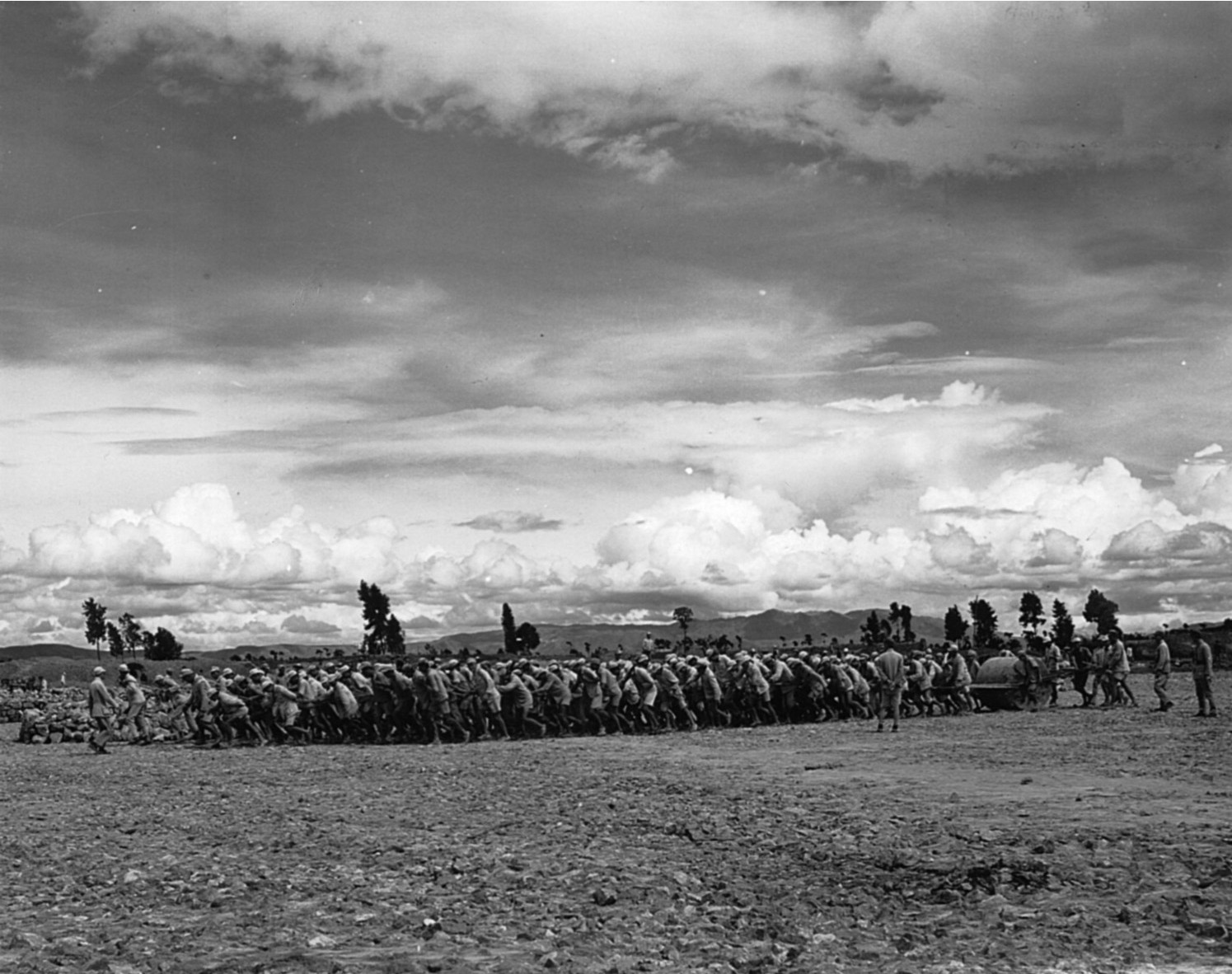
Hundreds of Chinese laborers pull a roller to smooth a runway for a B-29 airstrip.

Chinese laborers assembled for the project were organized in groups of 40,000 to 100,000 according to their local xian (counties); each xian was responsible for supplying a quota of workers. Workers had to provide their own tools and bring ninety days' rations with them. Food and accommodation were provided by the Chinese War Area Service Corps. The Chinese authorities insisted that workers from different xian could not be mixed, so each xian was allocated a portion of the project. The workers established temporary camps near the bases, which minimized travel time and facilitated health care and sanitation. Cooks provided meals of rice and steamed vegetables in baskets. Meat was provided once a week.

Since communications between China and India were solely by air, it was impractical to bring cement, asphalt or concrete mixers to China from India. The Chinese airfields had to be made entirely from local rock, gravel and sand. Farrell sent some small rock crushers and provided a detachment of engineers to install the fuel handling systems. Because the B-29 runways could not be brought up to standard, they were built to the full length of 8,500 feet (2,600 m) to allow for an extra margin of safety. They were 19 inches (48 cm) deep, with 52 hardstands for each. The accompanying fighter strips were 4,000 feet (1,200 m) long, 150 feet (46 m) wide and 8 to 12 inches (20 to 30 cm) deep with 4 to 8 hardstands each. Structures totaling 19,000 square meters (200,000 sq ft) were built, and each base had an oil storage tank.

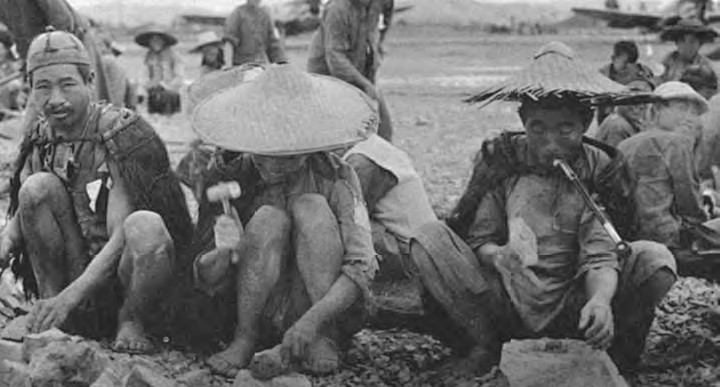
Chinese laborers break rocks into smaller pieces for use as gravel

Some 1,000 ox carts, 15,000 wheelbarrows and 1,500 trucks were used to carry building materials. There were no bulldozers, power shovels or graders. The topsoil and some of the subsoil was removed with hoes and was carried away in wicker baskets on shoulder poles by men and boys. The subsoil was rolled flat using huge concrete rollers hauled by up to 300 workers. A layer of pebbles taken from nearby streams was laid down using wheelbarrows. Over 300,000 cubic meters (390,000 cu yd) were used for the runways and taxiways. Workers collected them from the banks of the Min River. When this source became depleted, they waded into the freezing rapids and shoals to collect them from the riverbed. Rocks had to be used to supplement the pebbles. Men, women and children shaped them with hammers and chisels so they would not shift about. A slurry of topsoil and subsoil was laid atop the rocks as a binder, which was then rolled flat. Successive layers of rock and slurry were laid down. Saunders landed the first B-29 at Guanghan on 24 April, where he was met by officials including Wolfe, Zhang, and Major General Claire L. Chennault, the commander of the China-based Fourteenth Air Force. All four airfields were completed by 10 May 1944.

=== Ceylon ===
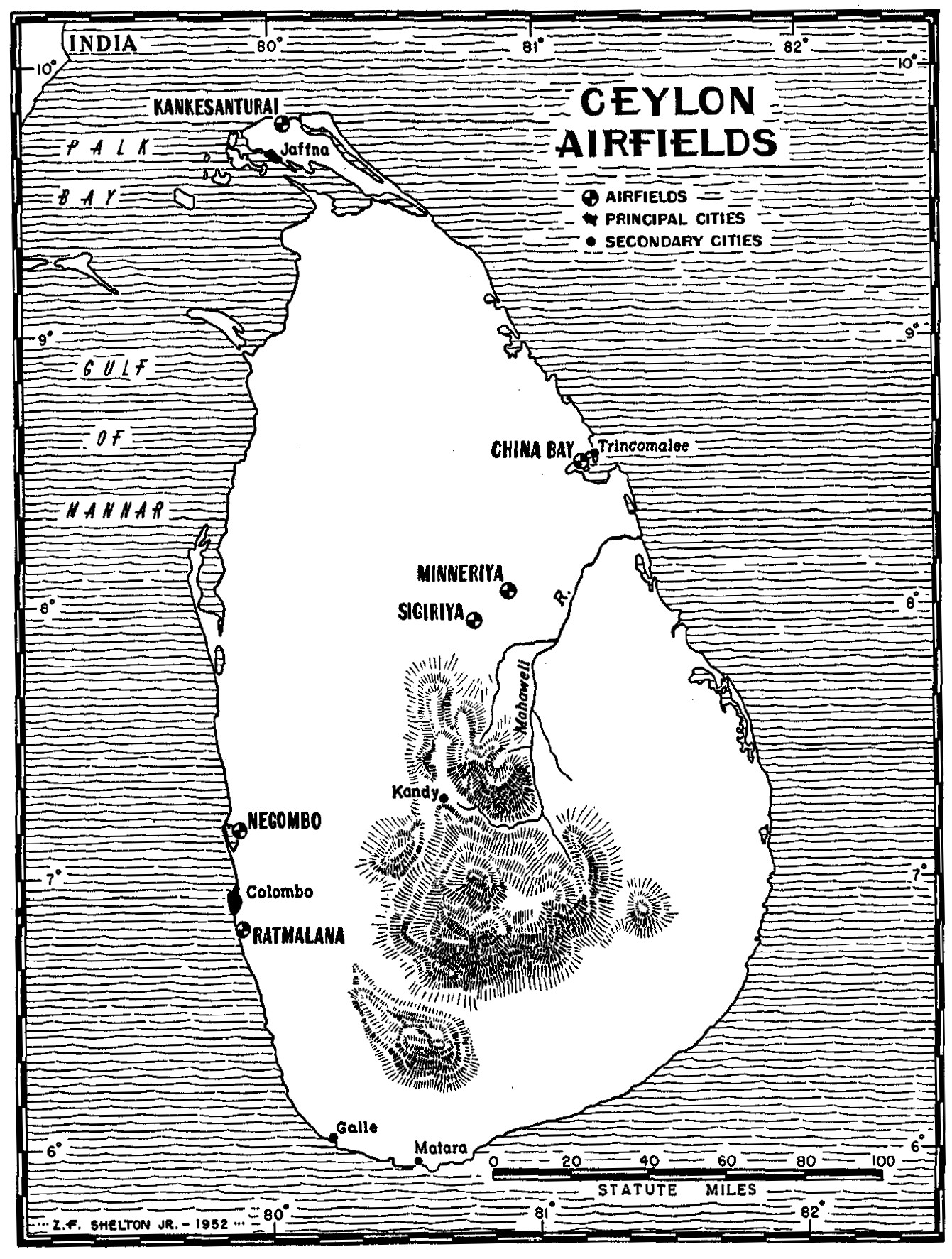
B-29 airfields in Ceylon

In addition to raids on Japan from bases in China, the Sextant Conference also approved attacks on the oil refineries in the Dutch East Indies by B-29s based in India, staging through Ceylon, with a target date of 20 July 1944. Although the southeast corner of Ceylon would have been the best location from a tactical point of view, being closest to the oil refinery at Palembang, it was rejected due to the poor communications with that part of the island.

Airbase construction in Ceylon was a SEAC responsibility. When the Assistant Chief of the Air Staff, Major General Laurence S. Kuter, paid Mountbatten a visit in Colombo on 5 March, he found work under way on bomber airstrips at Kankesanturai in the north and Katunayake in the west, with completion dates in late 1944 or early 1945. Neither was well situated for the proposed B-29 missions. The British then offered to extend airfields at Minneriya and China Bay, and this was accepted. By April it was apparent that the deadline could not be met. Work on Minneriya was suspended and effort concentrated on China Bay. By mid-July it had a 7,200-foot (2,200 m) runway with hardstands, fuel pumps and accommodation for 56 B-29s.

Only one raid, Operation Boomerang, was conducted on the oil facilities at Palembang, on 10/11 August 1944. Little damage was done. On 24 August, the XX Bomber Command recommended that the base at China Bay be abandoned, and Twentieth Air Force concurred on 3 October. No further B-29 missions were flown from Ceylon. The Army Air Force historian, James Cate, considered that the "cost of developing China Bay into a VHB base for a single fruitless mission, whether figured in terms of effort and materiel or funds, is a glaring example of the extravagance of war."

== Deployment ==
The Matterhorn plan called for 20,000 troops and 200,000 short tons (180,000 t) of cargo to be shipped from the United States to CBI between 1 January and 30 June 1944, followed by 20,000 short tons (18,000 t) of fuel per month starting in April 1944. This would not have been a major undertaking for the European Theater of Operations, but movement to CBI was complicated by the long distance from the United States, the poor state of communications within the theater and the low priority of CBI, especially with regard to shipping. The proviso at Sextant that Matterhorn shipments not materially affect other approved operations in CBI conflicted with the tight timetable and had to be disregarded.

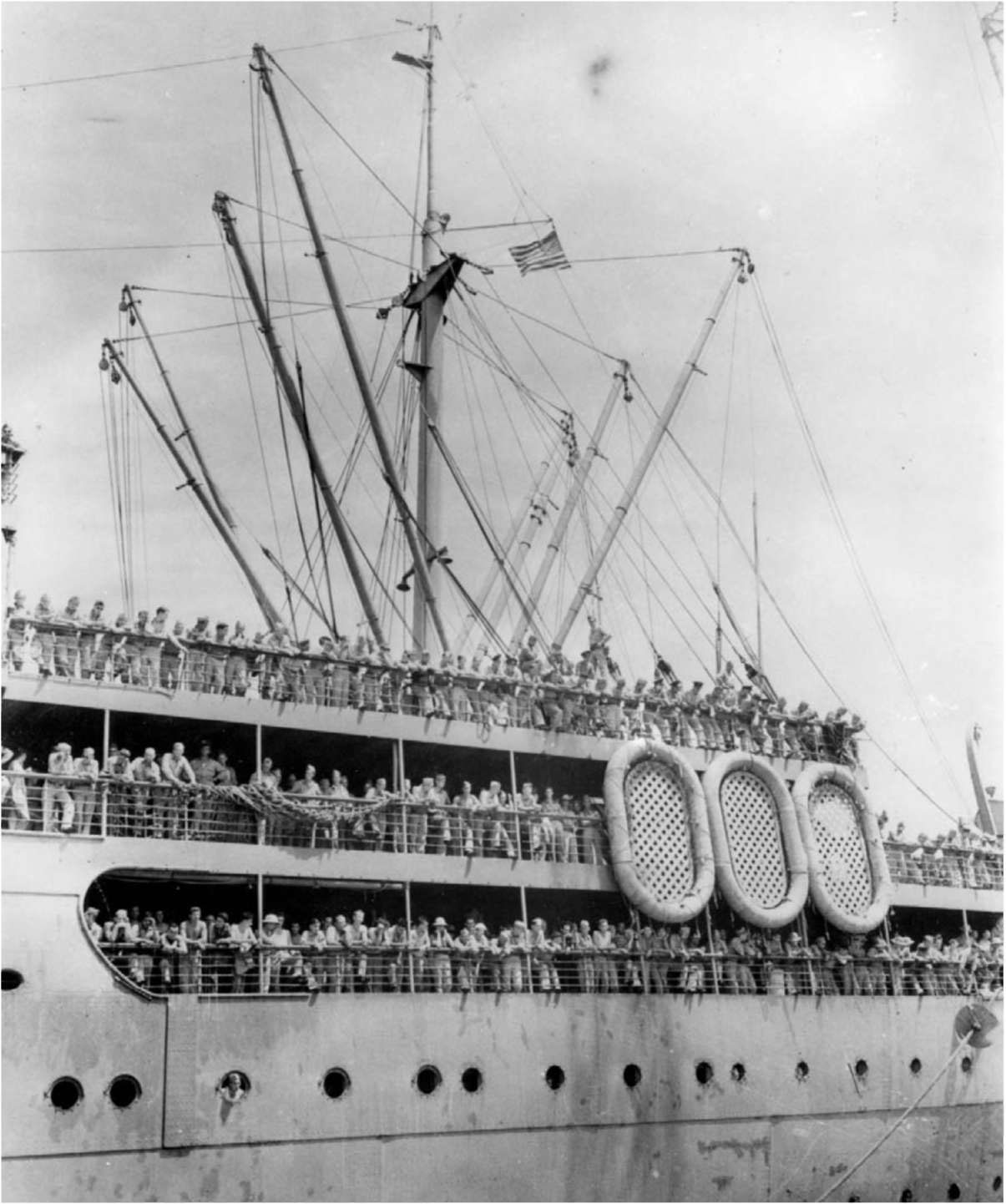
U.S. troops aboard a transport waiting to go ashore at a port in India.

High priority passengers and freight traveled by air. The Air Transport Command (ATC) ran a route via Natal, Khartoum and Karachi. The trip could take as few as six days, but personnel were often bumped from flights in favour of more important passengers, and many took over a month. The advance party of the XX Bomber Command, which included Wolfe, left Morrison Field in twenty C-87 transports on 5 January 1944 and arrived in New Delhi eight days later. Wolfe established his headquarters at Kharagpur, which was situated at a junction on Bengal Nagpur Railway lines serving the airfields. The Hijli Detention Camp was taken over to serve as his headquarters building.

It was originally intended that all air crews, both regular and relief, would fly in B-29s, but this was discarded in favor of carrying a spare engine in each plane in lieu of passengers. A sea–air service was instituted, sailing from Newark, New Jersey, to Casablanca, and then by air to Karachi. Twenty-five Douglas C-54 Skymaster aircraft were assigned to this service, which ran from 8 April to 1 June, and carried 1,252 passengers and 250 replacement Wright R-3350 Duplex-Cyclone engines. Stilwell provided this from CBI's allotment of ATC flights. The change from cold climate to the heat of the desert en route to India adversely affected the engines. After several aircraft were lost due to engine failures, Wolfe temporarily grounded the entire force to allow for modifications to the cowl flaps and the installation of crossover oil tubes.

Cargo ships usually went to Calcutta and troop ships to Bombay on the west coast of India, which was safer, as Calcutta was within range of Japanese bombers. The ports of India were congested and inefficient. Allied shipping losses had been lower than anticipated in the second half of 1943, so more cargo ships were available. By 19 February 1944, 52,000 short tons (47,000 t) of supplies were en route to CBI. Troopships were harder to find. Ships bound for CBI went via the Pacific, sailing south of Australia, or the Atlantic via the Mediterranean Sea and the Suez Canal. A Liberty ship took about sixty days to make the voyage from the United States to India, and the ports there were overburdened and inefficient, so it could only make two round trips per year.

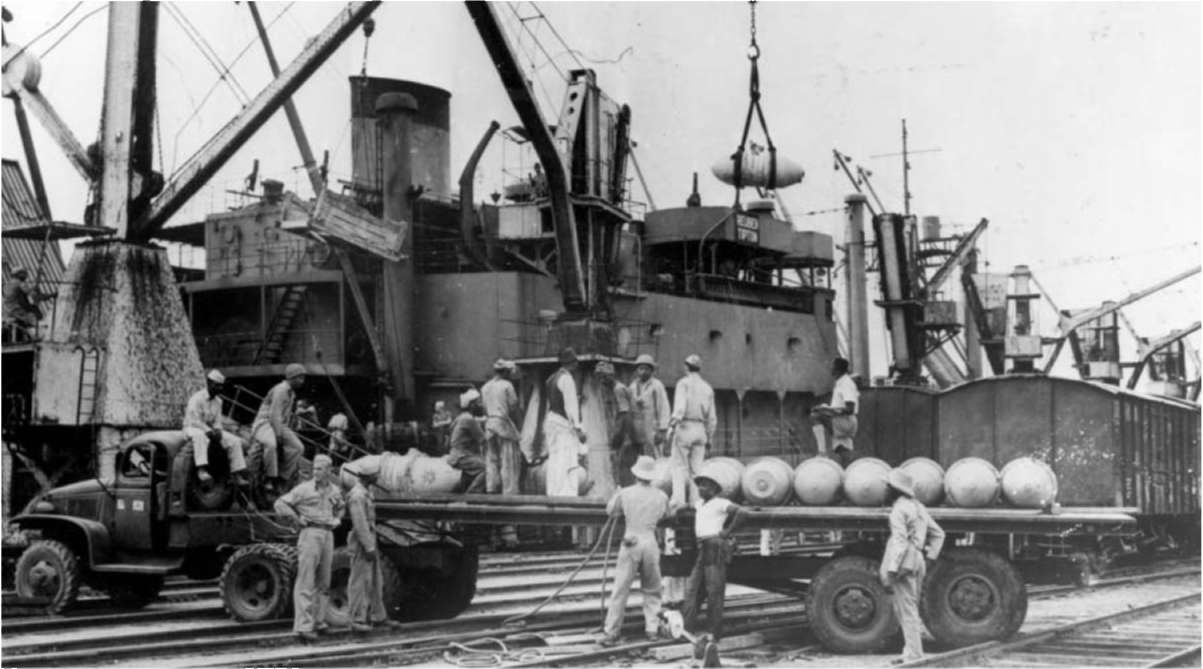
Unloading American supplies at a port in India

A contingent that included seven of the bomb maintenance squadrons departed from Newport News on 12 February with a Liberty ship convoy to Oran. From there, they were taken on the liner SS Champollion to Bombay, which was reached on 1 April. Other units sailed from Casablanca on the Dutch liner SS Volendam on 22 February, and reached Bombay on 25 April. Eight bomb maintenance squadrons embarked from Los Angeles on the troopship USS Mount Vernon on 27 February. Sailing via Melbourne, Australia, they reached Bombay on 31 March. From there it took a week to travel across India to Kharagpur by train. One contingent made the trip from the United States to Kharagpur in 34 days, but most took eight to ten weeks.

== Operational logistics ==
=== Aircraft maintenance ===
The USAAF defined four levels of maintenance:

- 1st echelon: Maintenance performed by the air crews of the combat unit. This typically involved routine servicing of aircraft and equipment, preflight and daily inspections, and minor repairs and adjustments.
- 2nd echelon: Maintenance performed by the ground crews of the combat unit and air base squadrons. This typically involved the servicing of aircraft and equipment, periodic inspections, and simple adjustments, repairs, and replacements of parts.
- 3rd echelon: Maintenance performed by service groups and subdepots. This involved repairs and replacements requiring heavy or bulky machinery and equipment requiring surface transport. This echelon performed repairs, salvage, removal and replacement of major unit assemblies that required specialized mechanics.
- 4th echelon: Maintenance performed by air depots, such as the overhaul of engines and major unit assemblies.

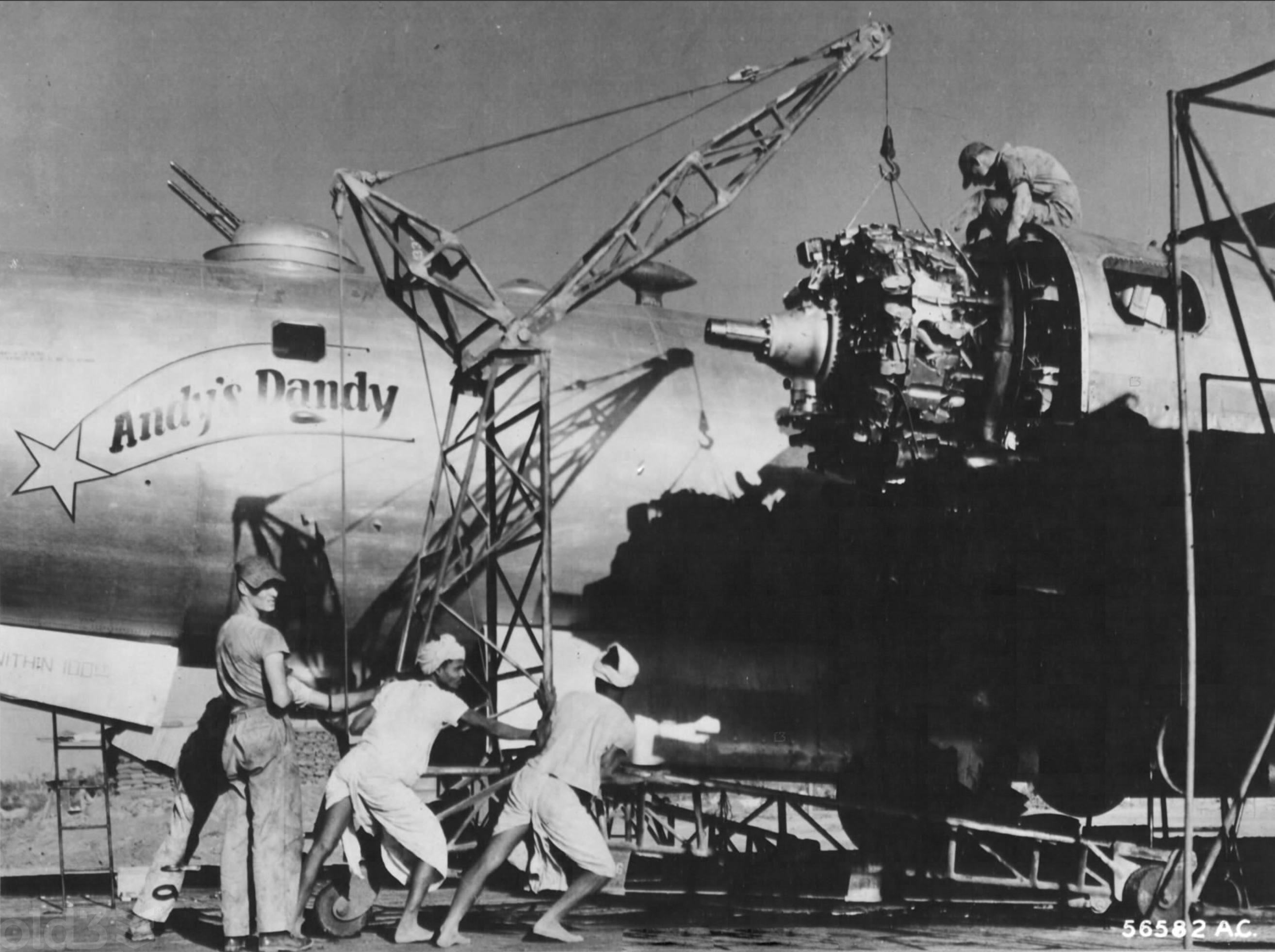
Superfortress 42-65208 Andy's Dandy undergoing engine repairs in India

Since it was intended that the XX Bomber Command would be self-sufficient, it would handle its own 1st, 2nd and 3rd echelon maintenance, leaving only 4th echelon work to be done by the CBI Air Service Command. The ground personnel were separated from the bombardment squadrons, and formed into sixteen maintenance squadrons. Two regular air service groups were assigned to the XX Bomber Command, the 25th and 28th Service Groups. They were shipped early to help establish the bases, but were delayed en route by six weeks and did not reach Bombay until May. On arrival, they were assigned to the Air Service Command until an appeal from Wolfe resulted in Stilwell reassigning them to the XX Bomber Command on 7 June.

The two groups were reorganized into four, with the 80th and 87th Service Groups being formed, so each of the bases in India had its own service group. In September, the sixteen maintenance squadrons were disbanded and the ground crews assigned to the air squadrons. There were now only twelve squadrons instead of sixteen, and the surplus personnel were used to fill out the service groups. Although there were sufficient numbers, there remained critical shortages in certain specialist personnel, particularly mechanics skilled in maintaining the temperamental Wright R-3350 Duplex-Cyclone engines.

=== Supplying the bases in China ===
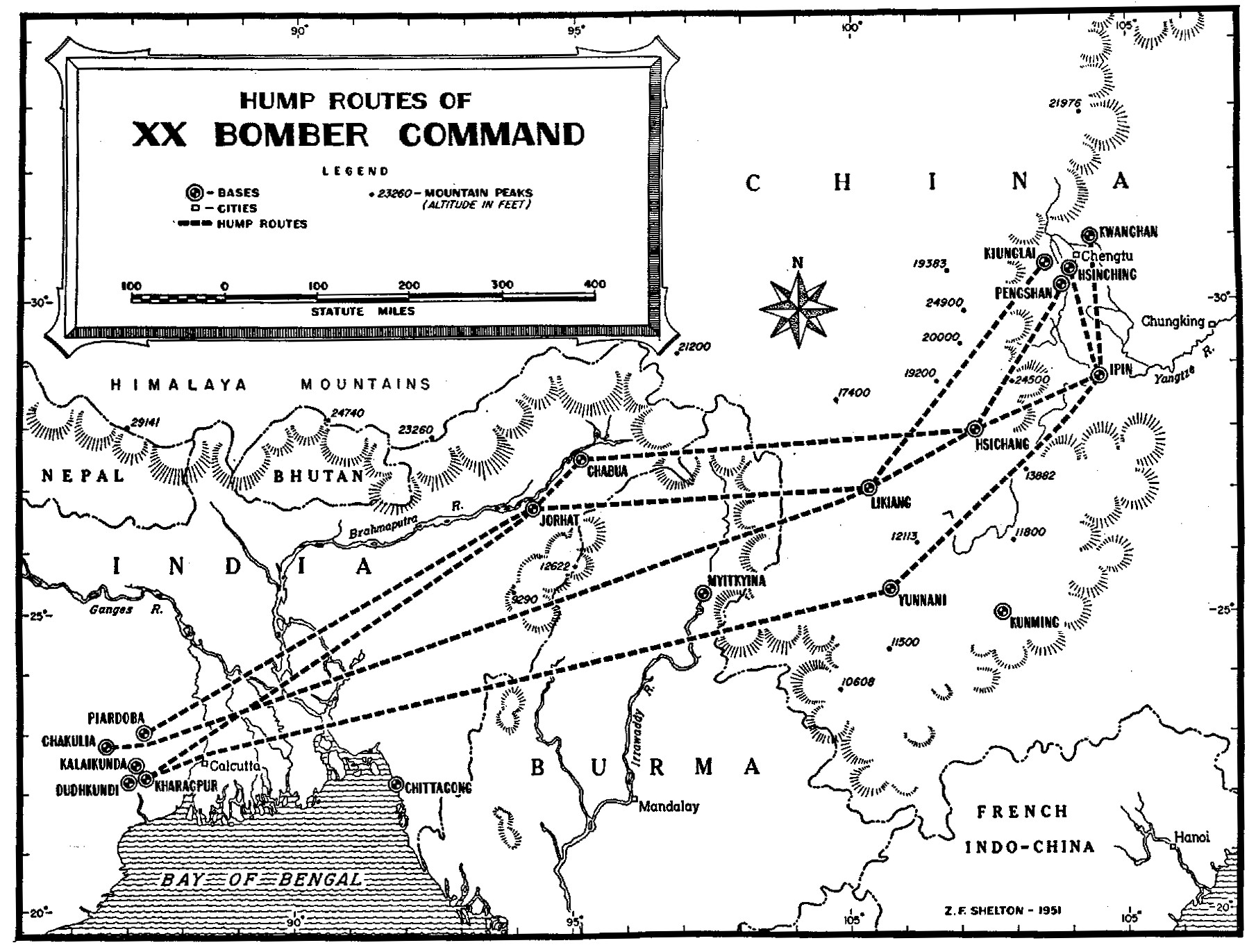
Hump routes of the XX Bomber Command

The XX Bomber Command was well-situated in India, enjoying good road and rail communications with the port of Calcutta, the 28th Air Depot at Barrackpore, the ATC terminus in Assam, and the Air Service Command installations at Alipore. But delays in stocking the bases in China upset the Matterhorn timetable. Supplies moved by rail and barge from the port at Calcutta to Assam, from whence they were flown across the Hump. Although a key feature of the Matterhorn plan was that the XX Bomber Command would support itself, this was soon revealed to be impractical, and it had to fall back on the services of Brigadier General Thomas O. Hardin's India–China Wing (ICW) of the ATC. This generated friction with the Fourteenth Air Force, which saw the XX Bomber Command as an interloping freeloader.

The twenty C-87s that the XX Bomber Command brought with it had been flown out by ATC pilots on 90 days' temporary duty. They were intended to be operated by pilots of the 308th Bombardment Group, but Major General George E. Stratemeyer, the CBI Air Forces commander, objected to this arrangement. Instead, the nineteen C-87s (one having been lost en route) were turned over to the ATC in return for an undertaking that the temporary-duty ATC pilots continued to fly them until the pilots had to return to the United States, after which the C-87s would be returned to the XX Bomber Command. The ICW promised that the XX Bomber Command would receive 1,650 short tons (1,500 t) of the first 10,250 short tons (9,300 t) flown over the Hump in February, plus half of the next 1,250 short tons (1,130 t), a possible total of 2,275 short tons (2,064 t), assuming that the ATC could meet its target. As it happened, the ATC exceeded its target, and delivered 12,950 short tons (11,750 t), but Wolfe handed 1,534 short tons (1,392 t) over to Chennault and the XX Bomber Command received just 400 short tons (360 t).

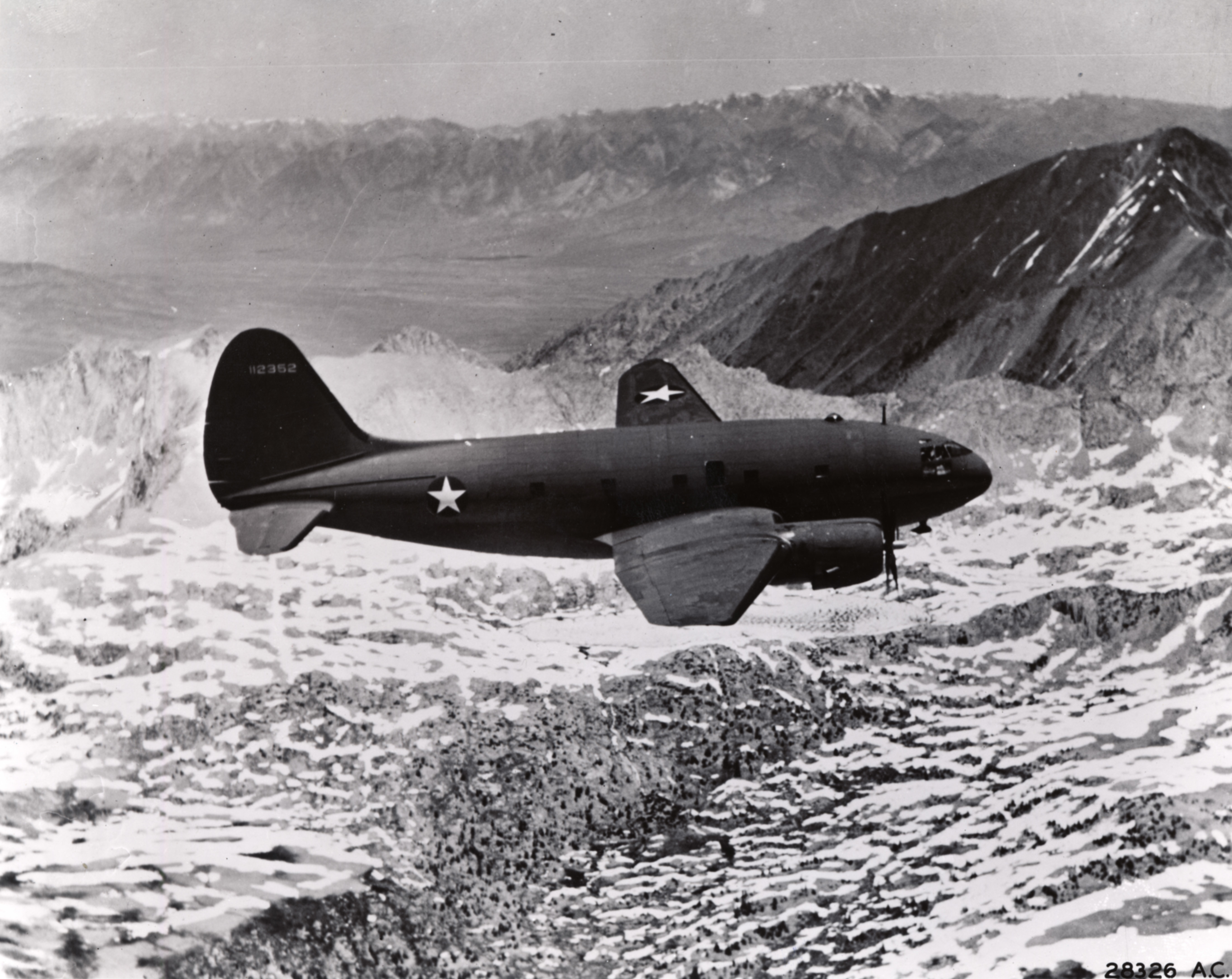
A Curtiss C-46 Commando flies over the Hump

March was a difficult month for the ICW, with a gasoline shortage in Assam. The opening of the Battle of Imphal and operations in Northern Burma and Western Yunnan caused both ATC aircraft and 682 short tons (619 t) of supplies intended for Matterhorn to be diverted to support of the ground forces. In April the C-46s only managed to haul a meager 14 short tons (13 t) to China. The first two B-29s flew across the Hump with gasoline on 26 April. One, flown by Major Charles Hansen, was attacked by six Japanese Nakajima Ki-43 Hayabusa (Oscar) fighters. Hansen's crew was credited with downing one of the fighters; one crewman was wounded. In turn, the Japanese pilots claimed to have shot him down, but all the aircraft involved landed safely. B-29s delivered 27 short tons (24 t) that month. A B-29 combat sortie was estimated to require 23 short tons (21 t), so this was sufficient to support one combat sortie. Wolfe calculated that he needed 4,600 short tons (4,200 t) to support two 100-bomber raids on Japan.

Equipment, supplies and personnel in China were kept to an absolute minimum. To save fuel, only one land vehicle was permitted to run at each base. There were no supplementary rations, no additional personal or organizational equipment, no spare clothing and little mail. "Indeed," the XX Bomber Command historian noted, "insofar as supply was concerned, personnel in the forward area were isolated and limited as if they had been on a desert island."

Arnold assigned three squadrons with eighteen Curtiss C-46 Commando each to support Matterhorn. The first C-46 reached Bengal on 10 April. One squadron was assigned to the Hump run while the other two, designated the 1st and 2nd Air Transport Squadrons (Mobile), joined the ATC's North African Wing. They lacked the range of the C-54s and had to make more stopovers, but they hauled 333 short tons (302 t) per month in June and July, which included 225 spare Wright R-3350 Duplex-Cyclone engines. Matterhorn was also allocated 50 short tons (45 t) per month from the weekly ATC "Fireball" service to CBI, which flew in urgently required spare parts from the Fairfield Aviation General Supply Depot in Fairfield, Ohio.

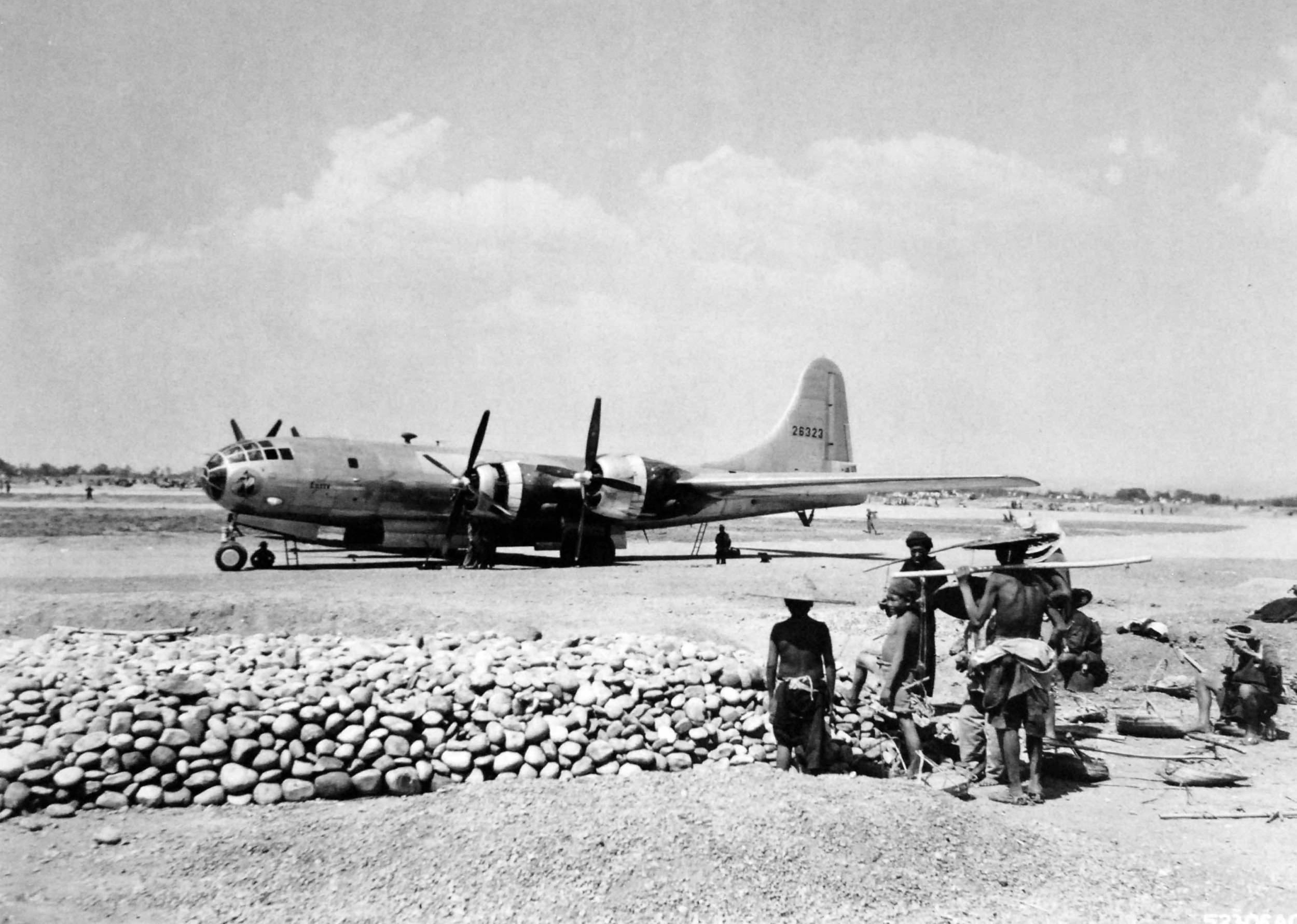
B-29 42-6323 Princess Eileen of the 444th Bombardment Group in China. This aircraft was reconfigured as a tanker and lost over the Hump on 26 June 1944 with all eleven crew members. Seven bodies were recovered in the days after the crash; those of three more were identified and interred in 2023.

The ICW delivered 1,293 short tons (1,173 t) in May. Wolfe had some B-29s converted to tankers by stripping them of combat equipment except for the tail guns. In this configuration, a B-29 could carry seven tons instead of three. On 26 May, the Japanese launched an offensive in China. Stilwell diverted Hump tonnage earmarked for Matterhorn to the Fourteenth Air Force, and forwarded a request from Chiang that the XX Bomber Command's stockpiles in China be handed over to the Fourteenth Air Force to the Joint Chiefs of Staff, but without his endorsement. The request was declined. The 2nd and 3rd Air Transport Squadrons were reassigned from the North African Wing to the XX Bomber Command. The former was assigned to the Hump run in June followed by the latter in July. The allocation to the 312th Fighter Wing was again cut, but on 20 July responsibility for its maintenance was handed over to the Fourteenth Air Force, along with its 1,500-short-ton (1,400 t) monthly Hump tonnage allocation.

Lieutenant Colonel Robert S. McNamara's statistical section of the XX Bomber Command conducted a detailed investigation of the different factors involved in the delivery of supplies to China. He managed to reduce gasoline consumption on a B-29 round trip to China from 6,312 US gallons (23,890 L) in May to 5,651 US gallons (21,390 L) in July, while the fuel it delivered rose from 495 US gallons (1,870 L) to 1,326 US gallons (5,020 L), and each B-29 tanker delivered 2,496 US gallons (9,450 L). In July, 237 B-29 trips and 419 C-46 trips delivered 1,162 short tons (1,054 t) in C-46's, 1,063 short tons (964 t) in tactical B-29s, and 2,998 short tons (2,720 t) in B-29 tankers. The XX Bomber Command also received 976 tons from the ATC, for a total of 3,954 tons.

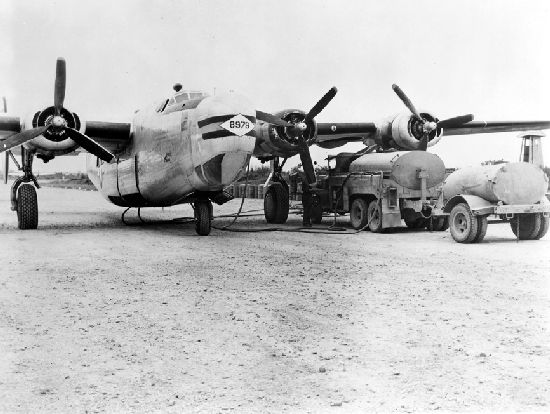
A C-109 Liberator Express tanker of the 2nd Air Transport Squadron unloads fuel in China in 1945.

Part of this was accomplished by flying a more southerly and direct route. This brought the B-29s in range of Japanese fighters based in northern Burma, but there were only seven contacts with Japanese fighters, and no attacks were pressed. The Hump was still dangerous, though, with high mountains and variable weather, and flights were counted as combat missions for the purpose of crew rotation. Twelve B-29s were lost over the Hump route by the end of July, mostly due to engine failures, and six C-46s by the end of September. Most of the crews were rescued by friendly Chinese civilians.

In September 1944 70 C-109s were added to the effort, flown by surplus B-29 crews, but XX Bomber Command, fearful of diversions to other agencies, resisted attempts to have them operated by ATC. Its transport procedures contradicted those of ATC, however, limiting its efficiency, and beginning in November 1944 the B-29s were withdrawn from the airlift and the C-109s were transferred to the ATC.

Hump tonnage for XX Bomber Command
Month of 1944	February	March	April	May	June	July	August	September	Total
C46s	—	—	14	117	280	1,162	798	707	3,078
Tactical B29s	—	—	27	518	404	1,083	—	504	2,536
Tanker B29s	—	—	—	22	396	753	1,106	814	3,091
C109s	—	—	—	—	—	—	—	415	415
Total XX BC	—	—	41	657	1,080	2,998	1,904	2,440	9,120
ATC	427	2,608	1,399	1,293	308	976	1,478	2,141	10,630
Grand Total	427	2,608	1,440	1,950	1,388	3,974	3,382	4,581	19,750

== End of Matterhorn ==
In late 1944, the Japanese Operation Ichi-Go offensive in China advanced relentlessly toward the B–29 and ATC bases around Chengdu and Kunming. Meanwhile, on 24 November, American bombers commenced raiding Japan from the Mariana Islands, making operations from the increasingly vulnerable and always logistically difficult China bases redundant. In January 1945, the XX Bomber Command abandoned its bases in China and concentrated its resources in India. This marked the end of Operation Matterhorn. That month, the Burma Road was reopened, and the first road convoy reached Kunming on 4 February 1945.

On 6 February, the War Department issued orders for the B-29s to redeploy to the Mariana Islands. The 312th Fighter Wing was reassigned to the Fourteenth Air Force on 8 February, leaving the 58th Bomb Wing, which was reactivated on the same day, as the only operational wing of the XX Bomber Command. The first water echelon, consisting of 2,275 men, sailed from Calcutta on 27 February. They were followed by an advance air echelon on 20 March. Four cargo ships loaded with equipment departed between 25 March and 4 April. An air echelon of 90 aircraft carrying 1,330 airmen flew to Tinian in the Marianas via Lüliang on 20 April; a second, of another 90 aircraft and 1,620 airmen, flew to Guam on 1 May. The last water echelon, consisting of 3,459 men, left on 6 May. The last shipment arrived in the Marianas on 6 June. The whole movement was accomplished without the loss of a single aircraft.

In ten months of operations in CBI, the XX Bomber Command had flown forty-nine missions, but only nine of these were against targets in Japan. Between June 1944 and January 1945, China-based B-29s dropped 800 short tons (730 t) of bombs on Japan. The post-war United States Strategic Bombing Survey (USSBS) judged that this was insufficient to make much of an impact. Chennault considered the Twentieth Air Force a liability and thought that its supplies of fuel and bombs could have been used more profitably by his Fourteenth Air Force. The XX Bomber Command consumed almost 15 percent of the Hump tonnage per month during Matterhorn.

The original aim of making the XX Bomber Command self-sufficient was overly optimistic: of the 41,733 short tons (37,860 t) of supplies delivered to Chengdu, only 14,517 short tons (13,170 t) were carried by the XX Bomber Command's planes; the other 27,216 short tons (24,690 t) were delivered by the ATC. A RAND report in 2023 concluded that Operation Matterhorn demonstrated the importance of pre-positioned supplies, redundancy in supply routes, and sufficient logistical capabilities. The supply route over the Hump was beset with logistical challenges arising from the terrain, distance and weather. These logistics difficulties reduced both the number and quality of sorties that could be flown from Chengdu, and thereby increased the cost and decreased the effectiveness of the entire operation.
