= Le Champo =

Cinema in Paris, France

Coordinates: 48°51′0.13″N 2°20′35.29″E

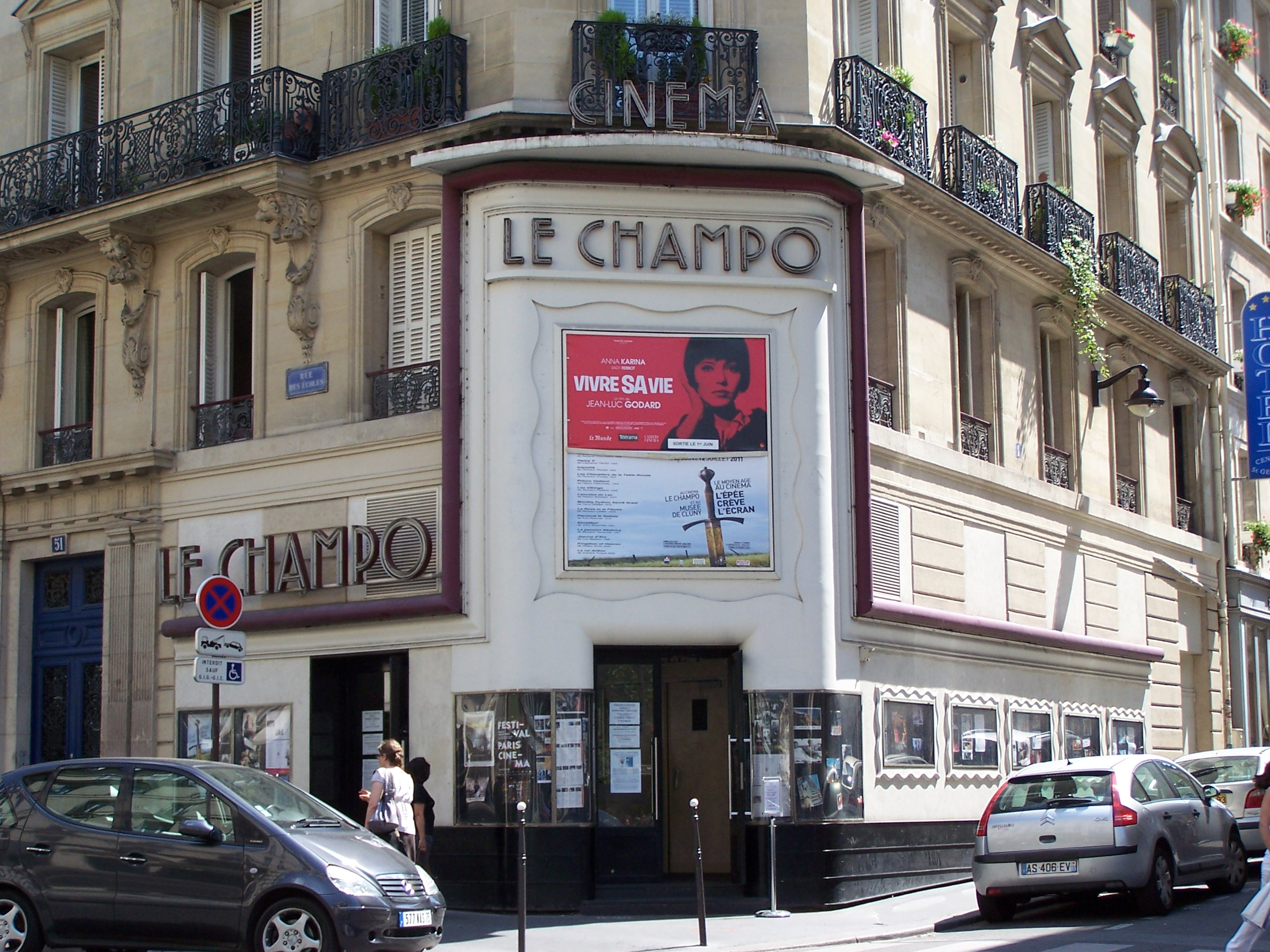
Le Champo

Le Champo, in full Le Champo – Espace Jacques-Tati, is an arthouse cinema in the Latin Quarter of Paris. It is notable for being a favorite haunt of important figures in French cinema history. French director François Truffaut called it his "second university".

== History ==
Situated on the corner of Rue des Écoles and Rue Champollion, the single-screen cinema opened in 1938, replacing a bookshop. In 1956, a second screen opened in the basement, replacing a cabaret theatre. Called Actua-Champo, this screen was dedicated to news broadcasts and had its own entrance. A single entrance was installed in the late 1970s. Plans to close the Champo in the early 2000s were cancelled following popular opposition.

Le Champo was frequented by well-known French cineastes of the 1960s and 1970s. These included Claude Chabrol, who called it his "second university", and François Truffaut.

== Architecture ==
The cinema is noted for its striking art-deco facade.

Le Champo's upstairs screen uses a highly unusual projection system. The projector is situated above the screen and depends on a periscope and a mirror at the rear of the theatre.
