= SS Champollion =

French passenger ship launched 1924

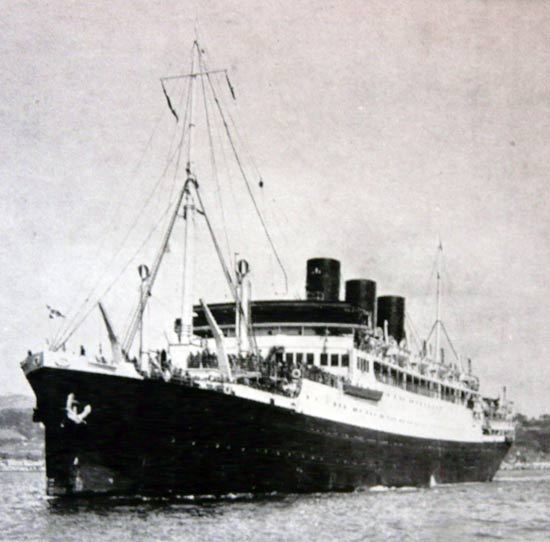

History
- Name: Champollion
- Namesake: Jean-François Champollion
- Owner: Messageries Maritimes
- Route: Marseille-Alexandria
- Builder: Sociéte Provençale de Constructions Navale, La Ciotat, France
- Yard number: 149
- Launched: 16 March 1924
- In service: September 1925
- Identification: Radio Call Sign: FOAO
- Fate: Wrecked, 22 December 1952

General characteristics (as built)
- Type: Ocean liner
- Tonnage: 12,263 gross register tons (GRT)
- Length: 158.5 m (520 ft)
- Beam: 12.3 m (40.5 ft)
- Draft: 2 m (6.7 ft)
- Installed power: 10,000 ihp (7,500 kW)
- Propulsion: 2 shafts; 2 triple-expansion steam engines
- Speed: 16.5 knots (30.6 km/h; 19.0 mph)
- Capacity: 949 passengers
- Crew: 310

SS Champollion was a French ocean liner built during the 1920s for the Marseille, France-Alexandria, Egypt, route. During the Second World War it served as a troop ship before resuming commercial service in 1947. On December 22, 1952, Champollion ran aground off Beirut due to a navigation error in heavy seas and broke up. 15 people were killed.

== History ==
=== Construction ===
SS Champollion was ordered, with the Mariette Pacha, for the Egypt-Syria fast route by the Contractual Services of the Messageries Maritimes from the Provençal company of naval constructions in La Ciotat. The ship was launched on March 16, 1924, in the presence of Luynes d'Auteroche, great-grandnephew of Jean-François Champollion and President Georges Philippar.

=== Career ===
==== Early career ====
The ship had a capacity of 949 passengers. 188 in first class, 135 in second class, 128 in third class, and 760 in the tween deck. The luxurious decoration of this boat refers to Egypt and to Jean-François Champollion, very popular decorations after the discovery of Tutankhamun's tomb in 1922. Among the artists who participated in its decoration: the painter Mathurin Méheut. Her sister ship the Mariette Pasha, named in tribute to the Egyptologist Auguste Mariette-bey, benefited from a similar decoration, but much less beautiful and less luxurious. They are both assigned to the Egypt-Syria rapid line (Alexandria, Port Said, Beirut). The Mariette Pasha was never modified and was scuttled on August 21, 1944, cut in two by explosives in the port of Marseille.

==== World War 2 ====
The SS Champollion career as a troopship came to end in 1947 between Marseilles and Indochina, and it was also a ship of Jewish emigrants, going from Marseille to Mandatory Palestine before the war, with nearly 1000 passengers, including more than 700 Jewish children in 1946.

=== Loss ===
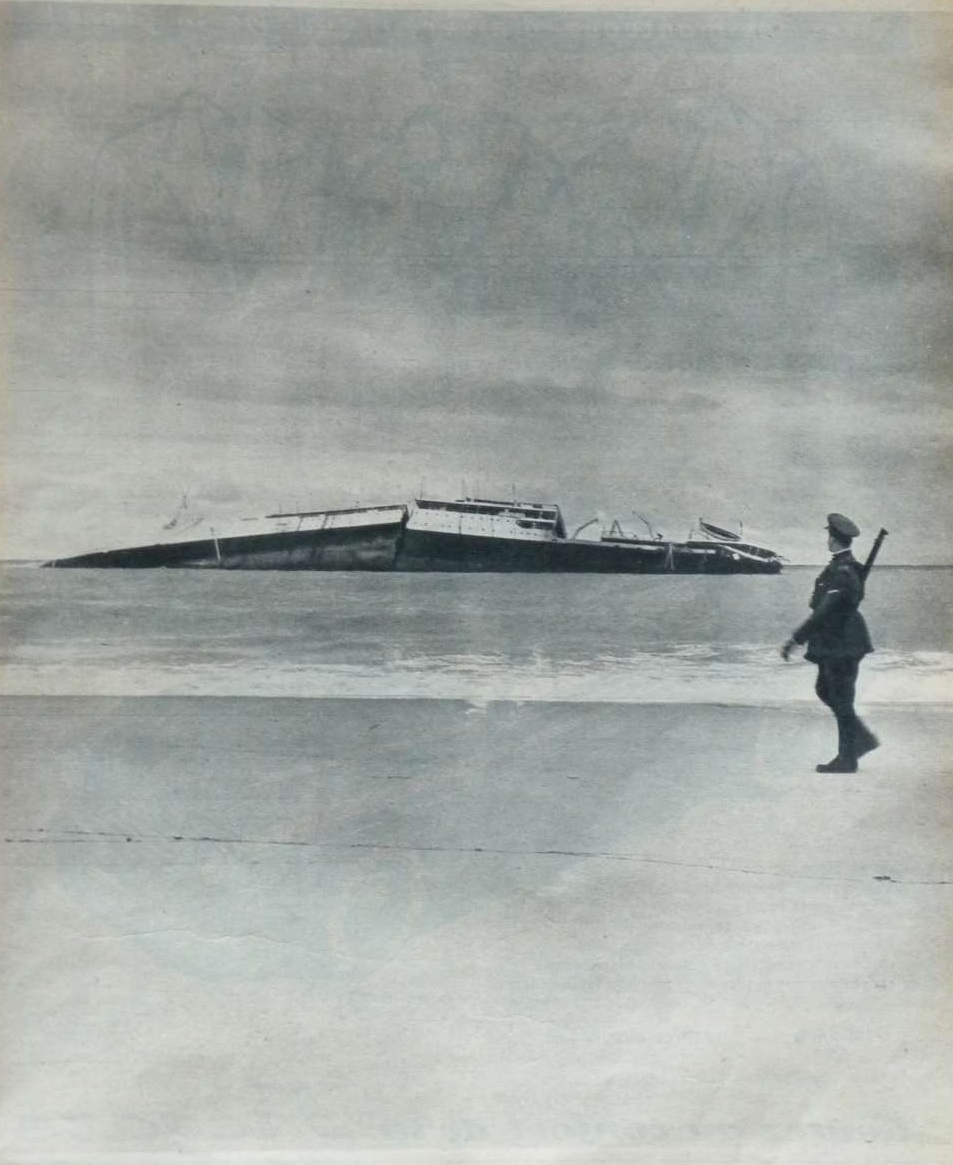
Wreck of the Champollion

On Monday, December 1, 1952, at 12.30 p.m., the Champollion set sail with 120 crew members and 111 passengers on board under the command of Captain Henri Bourne in Marseille for her next voyage to Beirut. Three weeks later, on December 22, 1952, the ship reached Lebanese waters in stormy seas. The captain was asleep at the time.

With the Al Manara lighthouse out of order, the Champollion headed for another light that turned out to be the airport beacon, 15 kilometers south of the port of Beirut. When the crew noticed the mistake, it was already too late. The ship ran aground off the coast of the suburb of Khalde, only about 600 meters from the beach. The stranded ship broke apart in a wind force 8 to 9 and a list of 20 to 30 degrees to starboard. 15 people drowned trying to swim ashore. Several ships and also the Lebanese army participated in the rescue attempts. The wreck was sold to the Lebanese National Engineering and Trading Company and was scrapped beginning on 22 December 1952.
